= Dasappa =

Dasappa may refer to

- H. C. Dasappa, Indian politician.
- Tulasidas Dasappa, Indian politician.
- Yashodhara Dasappa, Indian politician.
