= Kengal Shreepada Renu =

Indian politician (b. 1958)

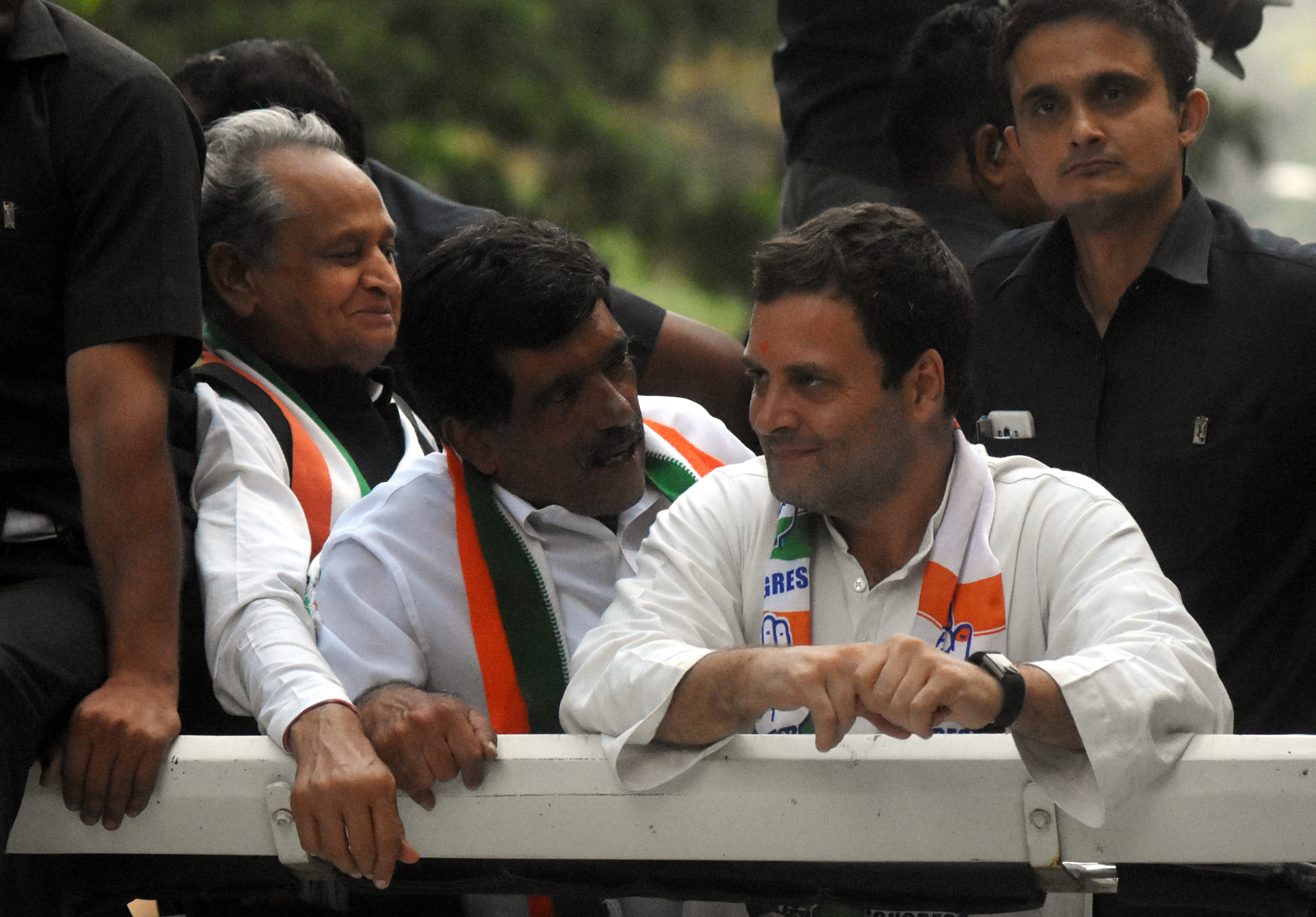
- Kengal Shreepada Renu (left) with Rahul Gandhi in 2018

Karnataka Congress Pradesh Spokesperson

Personal details
- Born: 8 November 1958 (age 67) Bangalore, Karnataka
- Party: Indian National Congress
- As of 11 April, 2015

Kengal Shreepada Renu (born 8 November 1958) is an Indian politician. He is the grandson of Kengal Hanumanthaiah, the most revered politician in Karnataka, who was the 2nd Chief Minister of the State, and, who built the State Legislature called Vidhana Soudha. He is also a former Ranji cricketer representing the State of Karnataka, and an accomplished golfer having won more than 50 club and amateur tournaments.

== Early life and education ==
Kengal Shreepada Renu, born in Bangalore in the State of Karnataka is the son of Dr. T. Timmaiah, I.A.S. (Retd.) who did his Ph.D. from London, and Vijayalakshmi. He completed his Bachelor of Engineering (Electronics) from U.V.C.E. Bangalore University, and an M.B.A. in International Finance from University of Central Oklahoma in the United States of America.

== Political career ==
Shreepada Renu is presently the spokesperson for the Karnataka Pradesh Congress Committee. He participated in the Padayatra from Bangalore to Bellary, a total of 320 kilometres. He is a member of the Campaign Committee. He was also an observer for the Ramanagar and Mandya district 2013 by-elections. He is chairman of the Kengal Hanumanthaiya Memorial Trust which has held various functions attended by the Honorable President of India, Pranab Mukherjee, Honorable Chief Minister, Siddaramaiah, and various Congress leaders.

== Sports ==
=== Cricket ===
Shreepada Renu also represented Karnataka in the Ranji Trophy. Of the 6 crore (60 million) population of Karnataka, only 250 players have played for Karnataka in the Ranji Trophy since its inception in 1942. Represented Karnataka State 'B' team in 1982–1983.

=== Golf ===
Shreepada Renu has won over 50 club and amateur golf tournaments, including the Amateur trophy for the prestigious Hero Honda Indian Open in 2001.

== Personal life ==
He is married to Roshan Shreepada and has a son Tehjas Shreepada Renu.
