= Bangalore North Lok Sabha constituency =

Constituency in Karnataka, India

Coordinates: 13.14°N 77.56°E

Bangalore North
- Lok Sabha constituency
- Bengaluru North Lok Sabha Constituency Map

Constituency details
- Country: India
- Region: South India
- State: Karnataka
- Assembly constituencies: K. R. Pura; Byatarayanapura; Yeshvanthapura; Dasarahalli; Mahalakshmi Layout; Malleshwara; Hebbal; Pulakeshinagar
- Established: 1951
- Total electors: 2,401,472
- Reservation: None

Member of Parliament
- 18th Lok Sabha
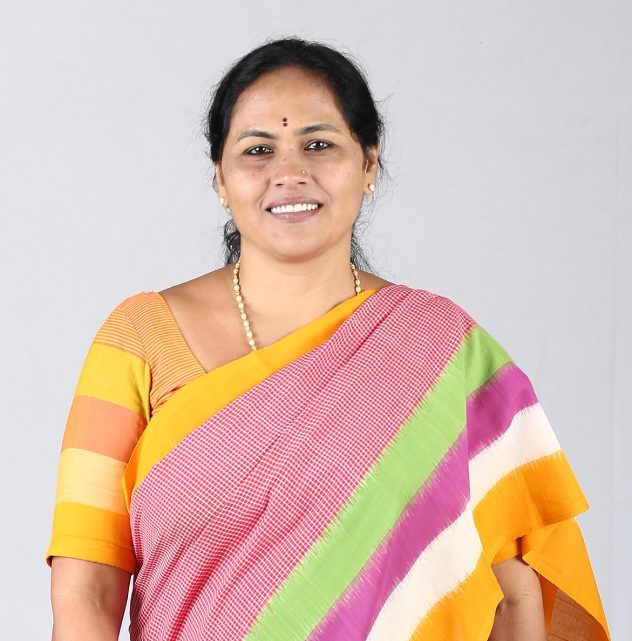
- Incumbent Shobha Karandlaje
- Party: Bharatiya Janata Party
- Elected year: 2024

Bangalore North Lok Sabha constituency is one of the 28 Lok Sabha (lower house of the Indian Parliament) constituencies in the South Indian state of Karnataka. This constituency has been known by different names in its history. For the 1951 and every election since 1977 it has been known as Bangalore North. For the 1957 and 1962 elections it was known as Bangalore City. For the 1967 and 1971 elections it formed a constituency jointly with Bangalore South and was known as Bangalore. From 1951 to 1973, this constituency resided in Mysore State. On 1 November 1973, Mysuru State was renamed as Karnataka.

Bangalore North held its first elections in 1951 and its first member of parliament (MP) was Keshava Iyengar of the Indian National Congress (INC). He was re-elected in the next election in 1957. K. Hanumanthaiya also of the INC represented this constituency for three consecutive terms from 1962 to 1977. C. K. Jaffer Sharief of the INC was its MP for five consecutive terms from 1977 to 1996 before being denied ticket in the 1996 election. C. Narayanaswamy of the Janata Dal party defeated Mohammed Obedulla Sharief.

This brought to an end a 45-year period where this constituency had been represented by a member of the INC from 1951 to 1996. Sharief became the MP once again in 1998. He was also re-elected in 1999 to serve his seventh term as MP for this constituency. H. T. Sangliana of the Bharatiya Janata Party (BJP) represented this constituency in 2004. D. B. Chandre Gowda also of the BJP was elected in the 2009 election. As of the latest elections in 2024, its current MP is Shobha Karandlaje of the BJP who is also the incumbent Minister of State for Ministry of Labour and Employment and Ministry of Micro, Small and Medium Enterprises in the Third Modi Ministry. Of the 17 elections held in this constituency, the most successful party is the INC who have won on 12 occasions.

== Assembly segments ==
Bangalore North Map

As of 2014, Bangalore North Lok Sabha constituency comprises the following eight Legislative Assembly segments:

No	Name	District	Member	Party	Party Leading (in 2024)
151	K. R. Pura	Bangalore Urban	Byrati Basavaraj	BJP	BJP
152	Byatarayanapura	Bangalore Urban	Krishna Byre Gowda	INC	BJP
153	Yeshvanthapura	Bangalore Urban	S. T. Somashekhar	BJP	BJP
155	Dasarahalli	Bangalore Urban	S. Muniraju	BJP	BJP
156	Mahalakshmi Layout	Bangalore Urban	K. Gopalaiah	BJP	BJP
157	Malleshwaram	Bangalore Urban	C. N. Ashwath Narayan	BJP	BJP
158	Hebbal	Bangalore Urban	Byrathi Suresh	INC	INC
159	Pulakeshinagar (SC)	Bangalore Urban	A. C. Srinivasa	INC	INC

== Members of Parliament ==
Year	Member	Party
1952	Keshava Iyengar	Indian National Congress
1957-1977: Seat did not exist. See Bangalore City, Bangalore and Kolar
1977	C. K. Jaffer Sharief	Indian National Congress
1980	C. K. Jaffer Sharief	Indian National Congress (I)
1984	C. K. Jaffer Sharief	Indian National Congress
1989	C. K. Jaffer Sharief	Indian National Congress
1991	C. K. Jaffer Sharief	Indian National Congress
1996	C. Narayanaswamy	Janata Dal
1998	C. K. Jaffer Sharief	Indian National Congress
1999	C. K. Jaffer Sharief	Indian National Congress
2004	H. T. Sangliana	Bharatiya Janata Party
2009	D. B. Chandre Gowda	Bharatiya Janata Party
2014	Sadananda Gowda	Bharatiya Janata Party
2019	Sadananda Gowda	Bharatiya Janata Party
2024	Shobha Karandlaje	Bharatiya Janata Party

== Election results ==
Vote share of winning candidates
2024	56.27%
2019	52.87%
2014	52.91%
2009	45.22%
2004	40.93%
1999	51.10%
1998	42.11%
1996	48.64%
1991	41.72%
1989	51.85%
1984	51.13%
1980	55.21%
1977	54.18%
1951	47.17%

=== General election 1951 ===
Indian general election, 1951–52: Bangalore North
Party	Candidate	Votes	%	±%
INC	Keshava Iyengar	83,513	47.17	N/A
Socialist Party (India)	C. G. K. Reddy	24,666	13.93	N/A
Independent	Mohammad Hanif	22,399	12.65	N/A
Independent	E. P. W. Dacosta	17,575	9.93	N/A
KMPP	D. N. Hosali	15,453	8.73	N/A
Independent	A. M. Dharmalingam	8,240	4.65	N/A
Independent	S. K. Venkataranga Iyengar	5,211	2.94	N/A
Margin of victory		58,847	39.24	N/A
Turnout		177,057	45.40	N/A
INC win (new seat)				

=== General election 1977 ===
1977 Indian general election: Bangalore North
Party	Candidate	Votes	%	±%
INC	C. K. Jaffer Sharief	198,669	54.18	−10.95
JP	M. Chandrasekhar	158,485	43.22	N/A
Independent	Abdul Azeez Memon	3,195	0.87	N/A
Independent	M. Guruswamy	2,299	0.63	N/A
Independent	K. K. Mishra	1,678	0.46	+0.40
Independent	Haji S. Habib Khan Azad Bashu	1,426	0.39	N/A
Independent	Rani Annadurai	924	0.25	N/A
Margin of victory		40,184	10.96	−26.30
Turnout		374,502	60.17	+14.90
INC hold		Swing		

=== General election 1980 ===
1980 Indian general election: Bangalore North
Party	Candidate	Votes	%	±%
INC(I)	C. K. Jaffer Sharief	219,108	55.21	+1.03
JP	B. Channabyregowda	102,573	25.84	N/A
INC(U)	M. D. Nataraj	65,253	16.44	N/A
JP(S)	H. L. Nanjappa	7,666	1.93	N/A
Independent	B. S. Nazeer Hussain Khan	1,123	0.28	N/A
Independent	B. M. Venkateshalu	793	0.20	N/A
Independent	A. R. Abdul Shukoor	364	0.09	N/A
Margin of victory		116,535	29.37	+18.41
Turnout		405,967	52.37	−7.80
INC hold		Swing		

=== General election 1984 ===
1984 Indian general election: Bangalore North
Party	Candidate	Votes	%	±%
INC	C. K. Jaffer Sharief	260,279	51.13	−4.08
JP	George Fernandes	218,733	42.97	+17.13
Independent	G. I. D'Souza	4,534	0.89	N/A
Independent	Narayana Reddy	4,341	0.85	N/A
Independent	Momu Anjanappa Reddy	2,305	0.45	N/A
Independent	B. K. Narayanaswamy	1,968	0.39	N/A
Independent	M. S. Channappa	1,827	0.36	N/A
Independent	D. S. William	1,779	0.35	N/A
BJP	N. Rajappa	1,704	0.33	N/A
Independent	Shankara B. R.	1,261	0.25	N/A
Independent	Jayaramu	1,142	0.22	N/A
Independent	B. M. Krishna Reddy	993	0.20	N/A
Independent	Mundey Phutane	892	0.18	N/A
Independent	T. Shivaram	830	0.16	N/A
Independent	B. Jayaram	634	0.12	N/A
Independent	Mohammed Saleh	614	0.12	N/A
Independent	Khalid Nishu	605	0.12	N/A
Independent	H. G. Lingaraj	592	0.12	N/A
Independent	H. R. Siddalingachar	544	0.11	N/A
Independent	Syed Rafiuddin	531	0.10	N/A
Independent	S. Kanagarajan	516	0.10	N/A
Independent	K. M. A. H. Gowda	375	0.07	N/A
Independent	A. Vijayanarayana Gowda	375	0.07	N/A
Independent	C. Srinivasa	369	0.07	N/A
Independent	K. K. Mishra	368	0.07	N/A
Independent	K. M. Nagaraja Reddy	367	0.07	N/A
Independent	H. V. Mohana	250	0.05	N/A
Independent	A. R. Abdul Shukoor	179	0.04	N/A
Independent	S. Manthiyappa	155	0.03	N/A
Margin of victory		41,546	8.16	−21.21
Turnout		518,766	59.68	+7.31
INC hold		Swing		

=== General election 1989 ===
1989 Indian general election: Bangalore North
Party	Candidate	Votes	%	±%
INC	C. K. Jaffer Sharief	390,460	51.85	+0.72
JD	Lawrence V. Fernandes	283,336	37.63	N/A
Independent	Syed Shahabuddin	55,046	7.31	N/A
Independent	B. R. Shankar	4,482	0.60	N/A
Independent	K. N. Kempaiah	3,120	0.41	N/A
Independent	B. Venkataswamappa	2,457	0.33	N/A
Scientific Vedic Revolutionary Party	K. K. Mishra	2,192	0.29	N/A
Independent	Byataraje Gowda	1,570	0.21	N/A
Independent	M. A. Khan	1,449	0.19	N/A
Independent	Narayanappa	1,376	0.18	N/A
Independent	V. Aswathappa	1,221	0.16	N/A
Independent	T. N. Rama Rao	1,209	0.16	N/A
Independent	A. Narayana Swamy	1,178	0.16	N/A
Independent	C. R. Lokesh Reddy	957	0.13	N/A
Independent	Balakrishnappa	901	0.12	N/A
IUML	Abdul Azeez Memon	843	0.11	N/A
Independent	M. L. Subbaraj	619	0.08	N/A
Independent	Venkateswara	618	0.08	N/A
Margin of victory		107,124	14.22	+6.06
Turnout		781,199	58.82	−0.86
INC hold		Swing		

=== General election 1991 ===
1991 Indian general election: Bangalore North
Party	Candidate	Votes	%	±%
INC	C. K. Jaffer Sharief	252,272	41.72	−10.13
JD	C. Narayanaswamy	1,91,955	31.75	−5.88
BJP	Pramila Nesargi	1,45,074	23.99	N/A
Surajya Party	K. K. Mishra	2,414	0.40	N/A
Independent	B. K. Narayanaswamy	1,161	0.19	N/A
Independent	Shivaramanna	1,067	0.18	N/A
Independent	C. J. Khader Nawaz Sharief	923	0.15	N/A
LKD	S. M. Raju	857	0.14	N/A
Independent	Mallikarjuna	747	0.12	N/A
Independent	K. Satyanarayana	720	0.12	N/A
Independent	Prabhuraju	704	0.12	N/A
Independent	Panner Selvan	665	0.11	N/A
Independent	H. V. Mohan	619	0.10	N/A
Independent	M. R. Vijaya Kumar	604	0.10	N/A
Independent	B. Puttaraju	542	0.09	N/A
Independent	L. Lakshmaiah	522	0.09	N/A
Independent	D. Jairam	469	0.08	N/A
Independent	M. A. Shujath Pasha	428	0.07	N/A
Kannada Paksha	Sripada Rao	410	0.07	N/A
Independent	Mahaboob B. E.	386	0.06	N/A
Independent	P. Venkatesh	299	0.05	N/A
Independent	H. K. Chandrashekar	263	0.04	N/A
Independent	Narayanappa	255	0.04	N/A
Independent	D. R. Venkatesh Gowda	234	0.04	N/A
JP	V. Aswathappa	213	0.04	N/A
Independent	M. Krishnappa	177	0.03	N/A
Independent	B. M. Krishna Reddy	161	0.03	N/A
Independent	Byataraja Gowda	153	0.03	−0.18
Independent	M. Sundra Murthy	120	0.02	N/A
Independent	Gaddam Obalesh	115	0.02	N/A
Independent	Fayaz Pasha	111	0.02	N/A
Margin of victory		60,317	9.97	−4.25
Turnout		617,388	46.24	−12.58
INC hold		Swing		

=== General election 1996 ===
1996 Indian general election: Bangalore North
Party	Candidate	Votes	%	±%
JD	C. Narayanaswamy	398,650	48.64	+16.89
INC	Mohd. Obaidulla Sharief	2,65,348	32.37	−9.35
BJP	Y. Ramakrishna	1,24,416	15.18	−8.81
BSP	B. Krishnappa	5,168	0.63	N/A
Surajya Party	K. K. Mishra	4,917	0.60	+0.20
Independent	Noorali Afzal	1,555	0.19	N/A
Independent	Bhaskar Reddy	1,444	0.18	N/A
Independent	G. B. Muthukumar	1,027	0.13	N/A
Independent	B. K. Narayanaswamy	906	0.11	−0.08
Bharathiya Nethaji Party	A. S. Mohanakrishnan	887	0.11	N/A
Independent	Lakshmaiah	867	0.11	+0.02
Independent	K. Padmarajan	848	0.10	N/A
Independent	B. Venkataswamappa	816	0.10	N/A
Independent	H. Basavaraj	772	0.09	N/A
Independent	Noor Pasha	755	0.09	N/A
Independent	Padmanabha Pillai	699	0.09	N/A
Independent	Mohd. Imtiaz	654	0.08	N/A
Independent	A. S. Paul	619	0.08	N/A
Independent	Antony F. Rajiv	577	0.07	N/A
Independent	Bharathkumar	566	0.07	N/A
Independent	M. Mohan	555	0.07	N/A
Independent	Mohd. Asif	536	0.07	N/A
Independent	Dodda Venkatashamappa	532	0.06	N/A
Independent	H. M. Ramakrishna	458	0.06	N/A
Independent	H. M. Sreenivasa Rao	445	0.05	N/A
Independent	K. Ananda	429	0.05	N/A
Independent	Meer Layaq Hussain	421	0.05	N/A
Independent	B. P. Umamahesh	369	0.05	N/A
Independent	M. Sundaramurthy	335	0.04	+0.02
Independent	S. K. Dhanraj	334	0.04	N/A
Independent	Bijoor S. R.	318	0.04	N/A
Independent	B. Ramesh	314	0.04	N/A
Independent	B. S. Shashidhar	306	0.04	N/A
Independent	C. Mahendra	288	0.04	N/A
Independent	Gaddam Obalesh	262	0.03	+0.01
Independent	G. Govinda Reddy	253	0.03	N/A
Independent	K. Sathyanarayana	228	0.03	N/A
Independent	B. Manzoor Ahmed	207	0.03	N/A
Independent	V. Aswathappa	203	0.02	N/A
Independent	M. Narayana	196	0.02	N/A
Independent	Rabhindranath Ojza	189	0.02	N/A
Independent	Monandev Alva	178	0.02	N/A
Independent	M. D. Shaik Dil	169	0.02	N/A
Independent	K. M. Thomas	166	0.02	N/A
Independent	Ravi Kumar	160	0.02	N/A
Independent	Yellegowda	158	0.02	N/A
Independent	N. K. Chandrashekar	128	0.02	N/A
Margin of victory		133,302	16.27	+6.30
Turnout		834,759	54.26	+8.02
JD gain from INC		Swing		

=== General election 1998 ===
1998 Indian general election: Bangalore North
Party	Candidate	Votes	%	±%
INC	C. K. Jaffer Sharief	399,582	42.11	−9.74
Lok Shakti	D. R. Jeevaraj Alva	3,27,135	34.48	N/A
JD	C. Narayanaswamy	2,06,396	21.75	−26.89
JP	R. Saravanan	4,959	0.52	N/A
BSP	J. Krishnappa	2,784	0.29	−0.34
Independent	Muniswamappa	1,258	0.13	N/A
Independent	Meer Layaq Hussain	1,247	0.13	+0.08
Independent	Muhammed Yasin	1,216	0.13	N/A
Independent	A. S. Rajan	1,140	0.12	N/A
Independent	Abdul Moulana Shariff	950	0.10	N/A
Independent	S. M. Raju	471	0.05	N/A
Independent	Asif Ali Shah	408	0.04	N/A
Independent	B. N. Srinivas	378	0.04	N/A
Independent	Noor Ali Afjal	340	0.04	N/A
Independent	Babu Abel	308	0.03	N/A
Independent	Siva Channabasappa	275	0.03	N/A
Margin of victory		72,447	7.63	−8.64
Turnout		961,717	57.78	+3.52
INC gain from JD		Swing		

=== General election 1999 ===
1999 Indian general election: Bangalore North
Party	Candidate	Votes	%	±%
INC	C. K. Jaffer Sharief	525,523	51.10	+8.99
JD(U)	Michael B. Fernandes	3,49,918	34.03	N/A
JD(S)	C. Narayanaswamy	1,05,843	10.29	N/A
Independent	K. N. Parameshappa	17,147	1.67	N/A
AIADMK	M. Sundaramurthy	16,656	1.62	N/A
Independent	Meer Layaq Hussain	13,271	1.29	+1.16
Margin of victory		175,605	17.07	+9.44
Turnout		1,028,370	56.26	−1.52
INC hold		Swing		

=== General election 2004 ===
2004 Indian general election: Bangalore North
Party	Candidate	Votes	%	±%
BJP	Dr. H. T. Sangliana	473,502	40.93	N/A
INC	C. K. Jaffer Sharief	4,43,144	38.31	−12.79
JD(S)	C. M. Ibrahim	2,08,588	18.03	+7.74
Independent	M. Venkatesh	11,347	0.98	N/A
Kannada Nadu Party	Joe Simon	7,079	0.61	N/A
Independent	Mohamad Ibrahim	6,878	0.59	N/A
Independent	Meer Layaq Hussain	3,604	0.31	−0.98
Independent	Uma K.	2,703	0.23	N/A
Margin of victory		30,358	2.62	−1.45
Turnout		1,156,845	54.22	
BJP gain from INC		Swing		

=== General election 2009 ===
2009 Indian general elections: Bangalore North
Party	Candidate	Votes	%	±%
BJP	D. B. Chandre Gowda	452,920	45.22	+4.29
INC	C. K. Jaffer Sharief	3,93,255	39.26	+0.95
JD(S)	R. Surendra Babu	1,10,983	11.08	−6.95
BSP	Padmaa K. Bhat	8,731	0.87	N/A
Independent	H. Pillaiah	5,804	0.58	N/A
Independent	V. Prasanna Kumar	4,034	0.40	N/A
Independent	T. B. Madwaraja	3,529	0.35	N/A
Independent	Zafer Mohiuddin	2,196	0.22	N/A
Independent	N. Harish Gowda	2,016	0.20	N/A
Independent	K. A. Mohan	1,932	0.19	N/A
Independent	Joseph Solomon	1,650	0.16	N/A
Bharatiya Praja Paksha	M. Tippuvardhan	1,506	0.15	N/A
Independent	Meer Layaq Hussain	1,304	0.13	−0.18
Independent	L. Nagaraj	1,198	0.12	N/A
Independent	T. R. Chandrahasa	1,017	0.10	N/A
Independent	A. Jaleel	864	0.09	N/A
Independent	Venkatesa Shetty	840	0.08	N/A
Independent	Kanya Kumar	828	0.08	N/A
Independent	H. A. Shivakumar	821	0.08	N/A
Independent	Anchana Khanna	797	0.08	N/A
Independent	Syed Akbar Basha	796	0.08	N/A
Independent	K. Sathyanarayana	691	0.07	N/A
Independent	G. S. Kumar	667	0.07	N/A
Independent	M. U. Venkateshaiah	666	0.07	N/A
Independent	B. K. Chandra	661	0.07	N/A
Independent	C. Krishnamurthy	647	0.06	N/A
Independent	Lakshmaiah	485	0.05	N/A
Margin of victory		59,665	5.96	+3.34
Turnout		1,001,657	46.72	−7.50
BJP hold		Swing		

=== General election 2014 ===
2014 Indian general elections: Bangalore North
Party	Candidate	Votes	%	±%
BJP	D. V. Sadananda Gowda	718,326	52.91	+7.69
INC	C. Narayanaswamy	4,88,562	35.99	−3.27
JD(S)	Abdul Azeem	92,681	6.83	−4.25
AAP	Babu Mathew	28,107	2.07	N/A
NOTA	None of the above	11,996	0.88	N/A
Margin of victory		2,29,764	16.92	+10.98
Turnout		13,57,553	56.53	+9.81
BJP hold		Swing		

=== General election 2019 ===
2019 Indian general elections: Bangalore North
Party	Candidate	Votes	%	±%
BJP	D. V. Sadananda Gowda	824,500	52.87	▼0.04
INC	Krishna Byre Gowda	6,76,982	43.41	▲7.42
NOTA	None of the Above	11,632	0.75	▼0.13
Margin of victory		1,47,518	9.46	▼7.46
Turnout		15,60,324	54.76	▼1.77
BJP hold		Swing	▼0.04	

=== General election 2024 ===
2024 Indian general election: Bangalore North
Party	Candidate	Votes	%	±%
BJP	Shobha Karandlaje	986,049	56.27	▲3.40
INC	Rajeev Gowda	726,573	41.46	▼1.95
NOTA	None of the above	13,554	0.77	▲0.02
Majority		259,476	14.81	▲5.35
Turnout		1,756,885	54.64	▼0.12
BJP hold		Swing	▲3.40	

== See also ==
- Bangalore
- List of constituencies of the Lok Sabha
