= C. K. Jaffer Sharief =

Indian politician

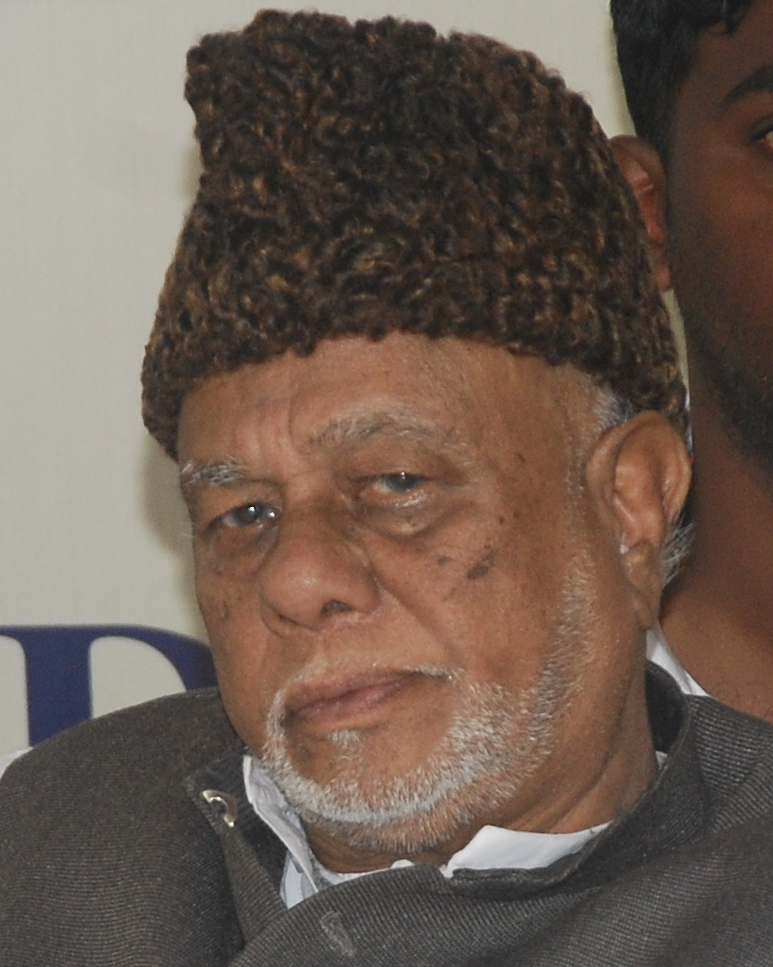
- Shri CK Jaffer Sharief on strike to save Amanth Bank in Bangalore

Minister of Railways
- In office 21 June 1991 – 16 October 1995
- Prime Minister: P. V. Narasimha Rao
- Preceded by: Janeshwar Mishra
- Succeeded by: Ram Vilas Paswan

Member of Parliament, Lok Sabha
- In office 1977–1996
- Preceded by: K. Hanumanthaiah
- Succeeded by: C. Narayanaswamy
- In office 1998–2004
- Preceded by: C. Narayanaswamy
- Succeeded by: H. T. Sangliana
- Constituency: Bangalore North, Karnataka
- In office 1971–1977
- Preceded by: M. V. Rajasekharan
- Succeeded by: M. V. Chandrashekara Murthy
- Constituency: Kanakapura, Karnataka

Minister of State, Railways
- In office 1980–1984
- Prime Minister: Indira Gandhi

Personal details
- Born: Challakere Kareem Jaffer Sharief; 3 November 1933 Challakere, Chitradurga, Kingdom of Mysore (present-day Karnataka, India)
- Died: 25 November 2018 (aged 85)
- Party: Indian National Congress
- Spouse: Amina Beevi
- Children: 4

Challakere Kareem Jaffer Sharief (3 November 1933 – 25 November 2018) was an Indian politician. He was one of the senior most Indian National Congress leaders. He was the Railways Minister of the Government of India from 1991 until 1995.

== Political career ==
Jaffer Sharief started his career in the Indian National Congress under Nijalingappa. After a split in the Congress, he took the side of Indira Gandhi.

Sharief's period in Ministry of Railways is considered as a golden period for Karnataka and unigauge system in country. He helped to address development deficiencies in Karnataka due to decades of neglect under Southern Railway zone and South Central Railway zone.

In 1980's as Railways minister for state, he was instrumental in gauge conversion of railways in the state, nearly 1000 kms of various gauges of tracks were converted to broad gauge in the state. He played a crucial role in setting up of Konkan Railway Corporation, Bangalore railway division, RRB Bengaluru, Inland Container Depot Whitefield etc. He was also instrumental in getting the Wheel and Axle Plant in Bangalore.

In 2012, Sharief was cleared by the Supreme Court of charges relating to expenditure on a trip to London for medical treatment. Sharief had taken several ministry officials with him, which the court found was not inappropriate. Corruption charges were leveled against him during his tenure as Railway Minister.

== Personal life ==
Jaffer Sharief lost three members of his family, with his younger son in 1999, his wife in 2008 and his elder son in 2009, three days before his election to Lok Sabha.

CK Jaffer Sharief died at the age of 85 in Bengaluru on 25 November 2018.

Lok Sabha
Preceded by M. V. Rajasekharan	Member of Parliament for Kanakapura; 1971 – 1977	Succeeded by M. V. Chandrashekara Murthy
Preceded by K. Hanumanthaiah	Member of Parliament for Bangalore North; 1977 – 1996	Succeeded by C. Narayanaswamy
Preceded by C. Narayanaswamy	Member of Parliament for Bangalore North; 1998 – 2004	Succeeded by H. T. Sangliana
Political offices
Preceded by Janeshwar Mishra	Minister of Railways; 21 June 1991 – 16 October 1995	Succeeded by Ram Vilas Paswan
