= Kengal Hanumanthaiya Memorial Trust =

- Founded: 2009
- Founder: Kengal Shreepada Renu
- Location: Bangalore
- Region served: Karnataka, India
- Members: 5 Trustees and over 150 members, of which 10% are members of the Karnataka State Legislature
- Key people: Kengal Shreepada Renu, Chairman of the Trust

The Kengal Hanumanthaiya Memorial Trust is a non-profit Charitable Trust that is dedicated to the ideals of Kengal Hanumanthaiya, the first elected Chief Minister of Karnataka, India, and the second to hold that position after KC Reddy who was nominated. In addition to the 5 Trustees, 3 of whom are from Kengal Hanumanthaiya's family, the Trust also has over 150 members from different walks of life who have one thing in common - Social Work. There are over 25 members of the present (and past) Karnataka Legislative Assembly who are members of the Trust. In keeping with the objectives of the Trust, all members are included irrespective of caste, community or any political or religious affiliations. The members of the Karnataka Legislative Assembly who are members are across the political spectrum from the Indian National Congress (INC), Bharatiya Janata Party (BJP), Janata Party (S), and Independents.

== Mission and Objectives ==
The Kengal Hanumanthaiya Trust has adopted the objectives as enumerated by Kengal Hanumanthaiya himself in that it should:

- To promote, propagate, or otherwise disseminate the ideals of liberty, equality, fraternity, social justice and parliamentary democracy in India
- To achieve this by building institutions with the same objectives and structures that adhere to the principles mentioned above
- To ensure that there is no discrimination whatsoever based on caste, creed, colour or sex
- To promote and establish educational institutions, particularly in the sports arena or otherwise
- To Institute studentship, scholarships, and the like to encourage deserving students and provide monetary help and assistance

== Initiatives ==
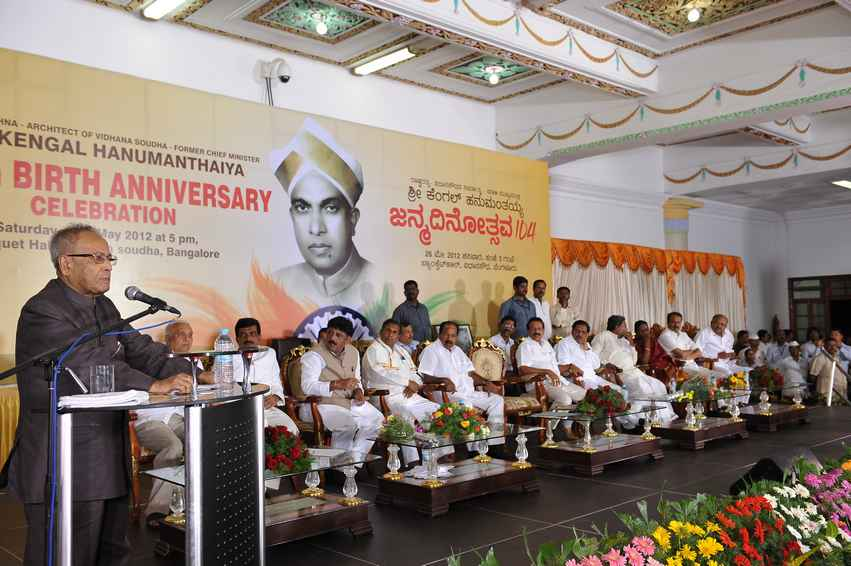
India's 13th President, HE Pranab Mukherjee inaugurating the 104th birth anniversary of Kengal Hanumanthaiya organised by Kengal Hanumanthaiya Memorial Trust

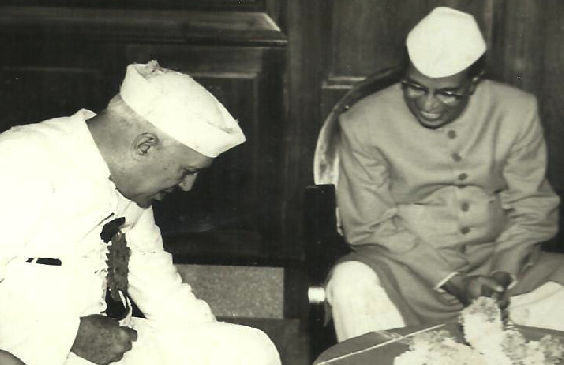
Kengal Hanumanthaiya and Jawaharlal Nehru during the inauguration of the Vidhana Soudha, the Karnataka State Legislature Building

The Kengal Hanumanthaiya Memorial Trust shortly after its inception organised the 104th birth celebration of Kengal Hanumantiaiya in 2012 The function was presided by HE Pranab Mukherjee, the 13th President of India (then Finance Minister) in Bangalore, who called Hanumanthaiya a "towering personality and the architect of Karnataka"

The Chief Minister of Karnataka (then Leader of the Opposition) in 2010, the Hon. Siddaramaiah mentioned that Kengal Hanumanthaiya's ideas are still worth emulating in this day and age.
