= Krishna Byre Gowda =

Indian politician

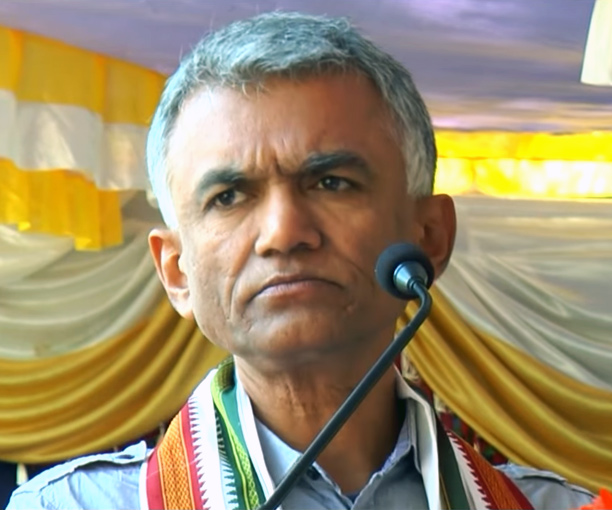
- Krishna Byre Gowda in 2025

Cabinet Minister Government of Karnataka
- Incumbent
- Assumed office 3 June 2026
- Governor: Thawarchand Gehlot
- Cabinet: Shivakumar ministry
- Chief Minister: D. K. Shivakumar
- Ministry and Departments: Bengaluru Development; Greater Bengaluru Authority; Bangalore Water Supply and Sewerage Board; Bengaluru Metro; Parliamentary Affairs; Legislation
- Preceded by: D. K. Shivakumar (Bengaluru Development); H. K. Patil (Parliamentary Affairs & Legislation)
- In office 27 May 2023 – 29 May 2026
- Governor: Thawarchand Gehlot
- Cabinet: Second Siddaramaiah ministry
- Chief Minister: Siddaramaiah
- Ministry and Departments: Revenue
- Preceded by: R. Ashoka
- Succeeded by: G. Parameshwara
- In office 23 May 2018 – 23 July 2019
- Governor: Vajubhai Vala
- Cabinet: Second Kumaraswamy ministry
- Chief Minister: H. D. Kumaraswamy
- Ministry and Departments: Rural Development; Panchayati Raj
- Preceded by: H. K. Patil
- Succeeded by: K. S. Eshwarappa
- In office 18 May 2013 – 17 May 2018
- Governor: Vajubhai Vala; Konijeti Rosaiah; H. R. Bhardwaj
- Cabinet: First Siddaramaiah ministry
- Chief Minister: Siddaramaiah
- Ministry and Departments: Agriculture
- Preceded by: Umesh Katti
- Succeeded by: N. H. Shivashankara Reddy

Member of Karnataka Legislative Assembly
- Incumbent
- Assumed office 2008
- Preceded by: Constituency created
- Constituency: Byatarayanapura
- In office 2003–2008
- Preceded by: C. Byre Gowda
- Succeeded by: Constituency abolished
- Constituency: Vemagal

Chairperson of the Public Accounts Committee, Karnataka Legislature
- In office 2022–2023

Personal details
- Born: Krishna Byre Gowda; 4 April 1973 (age 53)
- Party: Indian National Congress
- Parent: C. Byre Gowda
- Education: Christ University; American University

Krishna Byre Gowda (born 4 April 1973) is an Indian politician from Karnataka. He is currently serving as the Minister for Greater Bengaluru Development in the Government of Karnataka and as a member of the Karnataka Legislative Assembly, representing Byatarayanapura. He previously served as the Minister for Revenue in the Second Siddaramaiah ministry until 2026.

== In Government of Karnataka ==
He served as the minister of rural development & panchayati raj, law & parliamentary affairs from 2018 to 2019 in the cabinet of H D Kumaraswamy. He was the minister of agriculture in the Cabinet of Siddaramaiah from May 2013 to 2018.

He is the member of the Legislative Assembly from the Byatarayanapura Constituency since June 2008, he has served five times as an M.L.A. of Karnataka state, twice from Vemgal in Kolar district from 2003 to 2007, and thrice from the Byatarayanapura Constituency in Bengaluru.

== Early life ==
Krishna Byre Gowda was born in Bangalore, Karnataka, to C Byre Gowda and Savithramma. His father C. Byre Gowda was a senior legislator and cabinet minister of Karnataka State, having served as an M.L.A. for five consecutive terms. He served as the minister Of agriculture from 1996 to 1999 in the Cabinet of the then chief minister of Karnataka J.H Patel. Krishna Byre Gowda studied in Narsapura Government Primary School and then completed his SSLC in Satya Sai School Muddenalli. After completing his PU in National College Basavanagudi, he went on to graduate with a bachelor's degree in business management from Christ College, now known as Christ University in Bangalore in 1994. He then graduated with a master's degree (M.A.) in International Affairs from the School of International Service, at American University in Washington, D.C. in 1999. Before earning his M.A. degree, he was a project associate at the Ethiopian Embassy in Washington. He then worked as an agriculturalist at his family-owned farm in the Kolar district between 2000 and 2002.

== Political career ==
He began his political career in 2003, when his father and All India Progressive Janata Dal leader, C. Byre Gowda died. In October 2003, Krishna Byre Gowda contested and won the by-election to fill his late father's legislative assembly seat from Vemgal, Kolar District, to become one of the youngest members of the Karnataka legislature. In April 2004, Krishna Byre Gowda left the All India Progressive Janata Dal political party to join the Indian National Congress and won from Vemgal, Karnataka legislative assembly seat. Krishna Byre Gowda became president of the Karnataka Pradesh Youth Congress Committee in November 2007.

In 2008 Krishna Byre Gowda chose to compete for the urban Byatarayanapura constituency in Bangalore and won the election with 43 percent of the votes, defeating A. Ravi of the Bharatiya Janata Party with a margin of 9,352 votes. Since then Krishna Byre Gowda has focused on addressing problems unique to urban residents like bad roads, traffic congestion, drainage problems and uncleared garbage. He has also undertaken various infrastructural development works in Byatarayanapura like developing parks, playgrounds, open gyms and welfare centres through the help of the residents. He has also taken up various initiatives like the construction of auditoriums, toilets, dining halls and additional classrooms in Byatarayanapura government schools with C.S.R assistance from R.V Trust. In an effort to provide affordable housing and title deeds, the construction of 666 houses were approved in Kuvempunagar and around 450 houses were constructed with an approximate budget of 28 crores. Under his leadership, 2200 Hakku Patra titles were provided for beneficiaries in various areas of the Byatarayanapura constituency and 3000 Hakku Patras are in the process to be delivered.

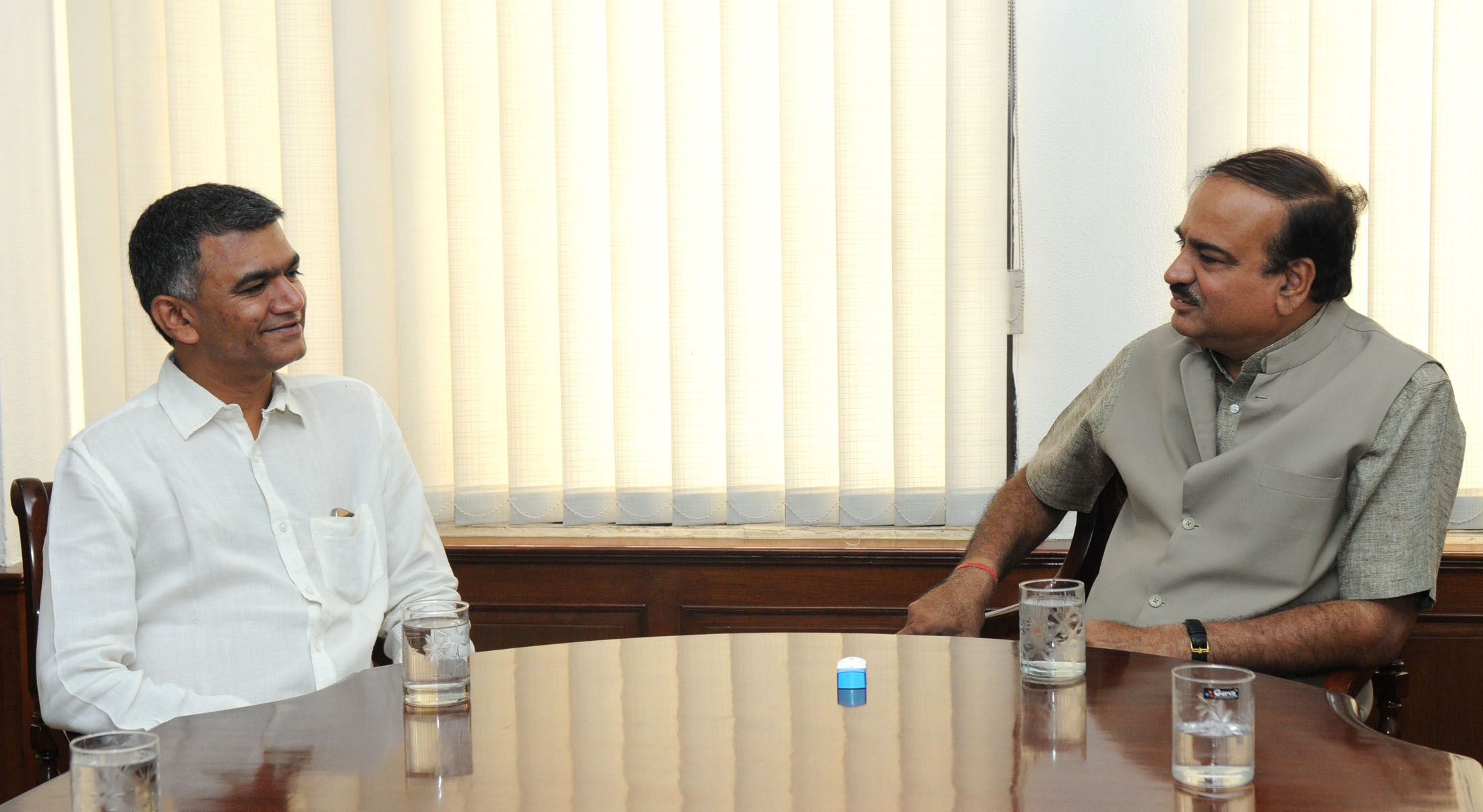
Minister of Agriculture Shri Krishna Byre Gowda with Union Minister for Chemicals and Fertilizers, Shri Ananthkumar

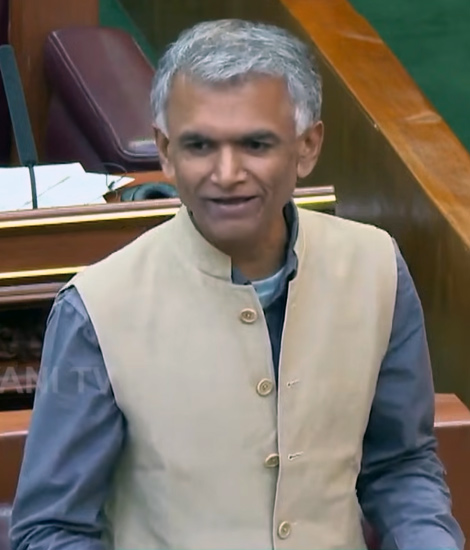
Krishna Byre Gowda speaking in Legislative Assembly in 2025

Krishna Byre Gowda was elected as a minister of agriculture in Chief Minister Siddaramaiah's Cabinet on 18 May 2013, at the very young age of 40. During this time he came up with various initiatives to promote the native grain 'Millet' and bring it back into people's diets. Krishna Byre Gowda believed that in a water-deficient state like Karnataka, this crop has a potential to go a long way as it just uses 25% of water to grow in comparison with rice. During his tenure, 20 Millet Melas at various locations across Karnataka were organized and the '1st Organic and Millet International Trade Fair' was organized which attracted over 2 lakh visitors and generated businesses worth 110 crores. As the Minister of Agriculture, he is also known for connecting 157 agricultural markets through the online market system "e-mandi". The "e-market" concept has now been recognized by the Centre and has led to 38% increase in farmer's income. Between 2013 and 2018, 13 out of 16 lake rejuvenation projects were carried out. He introduced a 'Debt Waiver Scheme' in which debt worth 8165 crores was waived-off benefitting nearly 22,27,506 farmers across the State.

He also introduced Krushi Bhagya to provide farmers with farm ponds locally known as "Krishi Hondas" not only to protect crops during severe droughts but also to ensure a good yield. This had resulted in over 20% higher yield in the crops and also protected the crops in the times of famine and drought.

He also served as the minister for rural development, law and parliament affairs in the cabinet of H. D. Kumaraswamy between 2018 and 2019.

Under his initiative Jalamrutha program was initiated to construct 2 lakh public water harvesting structures along with rejuvenation of over 20,000 water bodies across Karnataka.

Under his initiative, he also launched Swachameva Jayathe Campaign towards segregation of waste across 1000 gram panchayaths in Karnataka.

Krishna Byre Gowda served as the president of Karnataka Pradesh Youth Congress between 2007 and 2011, and as general secretary of the Karnataka Pradesh Congress Committee between 2012 and 2014.

== Personal life ==
Krishna Byre Gowda is married to Meenakshi Seshadri, an IT Professional.

== Electoral History ==
=== Lok Sabha ===
Year	Constituency	Party	Votes	%	Opponent	Party	Votes	%	Result	Margin	%
2019	Bangalore North	INC	6,76,982	43.41	Sadananda Gowda	BJP	8,24,500	52.87	Lost	-1,47,518	-9.46
2009	Bangalore South	INC	4,00,341	44.06	Ananth Kumar	BJP	4,37,953	48.20	Lost	-37,612	-4.14

=== Karnataka Legislative Assembly ===
Year	Constituency	Party	Votes	%	Opponent	Party	Votes	%	Result	Margin	%
2023	Byatarayanapura	INC	1,60,182	54.43	H. C. Thammesh Gowda	BJP	1,21,978	41.45	Won	+38,204	+12.98
2018	Byatarayanapura	INC	1,14,964	45.31	A. Ravi	BJP	1,09,293	43.08	Won	+5,671	+2.23
2013	Byatarayanapura	INC	96,125	41.52	A. Ravi	BJP	63,725	27.53	Won	+32,400	+13.99
2008	Byatarayanapura	INC	60,979	43.01	A. Ravi	BJP	51,627	36.41	Won	+9,352	+6.60
2004	Vemagal	INC	95,563	75.73	Srirama. S. N	BJP	20,204	16.01	Won	+75,359	+59.72
2003 By-election	Vemagal	AIPJD	68,458	54.38	V. Venkatamuniyappa	INC	57,175	44.59	Won	+11,283	+8.80

== Positions held ==
Position	Term
Cabinet Minister for Greater Bengaluru development excluding BDA and BMRDA	2026 - PRESENT
Cabinet Minister for Revenue excluding MUZRAI; Government of Karnataka	27 May 2023 - 2026
Chairperson of Public Accounts Committee, Karnataka Legislative Assembly	2022 - 2023
Cabinet Minister for Rural Development & Panchayati Raj; Government of Karnataka	May 2018 - 2019
Cabinet Minister for Agriculture; Government of Karnataka	May 2013 - 2018
President, Karnataka Pradesh Youth Congress	2007-March 2011
Member of Karnataka Legislative Assembly representing Byatarayanapura	2008 - Present
Member of Karnataka Legislative Assembly representing Vemgal	2003–2007
Project Associate, Development Alternatives Inc. Washington, D.C.	2003
Took care of Ancestral Farming lands	2000-2002
Project Associate, Ethiopian Embassy, Washington, D.C.	1998–99
