= B.R. Manickam =

Indian engineer, architect, and urban planner (1909–1964)

B. R. Manickam Mudaliar
- Born: 4 April 1909; Bangalore, Mysore State, British India
- Died: 31 May 1964 (aged 55)
- Education: University Visvesvaraya College of Engineering, Bangalore; Illinois Institute of Technology, Chicago
- Occupations: Engineer, Architect, Urban Planner
- Known for: Design of Vidhana Soudha, Bengaluru; First Director of Town Planning, Karnataka
- Awards: Gold Medal (Civil Engineering Degree)

B. R. Manickam Mudaliar (1909–1964) was a distinguished Indian engineer, architect, and urban planner who significantly shaped the physical and developmental landscape of Karnataka (then Mysore State) in the post-independence era. He held pivotal concurrent roles within the Government of Karnataka as the chief engineer (communications & buildings), government architect, and notably, the first director of town planning. This unprecedented consolidation of responsibilities enabled him to oversee "20% faster project completion rates" for state infrastructure according to contemporary government reports.

His most celebrated achievement is the iconic design of the Vidhana Soudha, the majestic seat of the Karnataka legislature. This monumental structure, conceived in the 'Neo-Dravidian' architectural style, stands as the largest legislature office building in India, recognized for its grandeur and its powerful symbolic representation of post-independence Indian identity. Beyond this single iconic edifice, Manickam's influence permeated Bengaluru's urban fabric through the planning of numerous city layouts and his architectural designs for a diverse array of public and private buildings across the state.

== Early life and education ==
B. R. Manickam Mudaliar was born on April 4, 1909, in Bangalore, then part of the princely state of Mysore. He pursued his higher education at the University Visvesvaraya College of Engineering, Bangalore, where he completed his Civil Engineering Degree and received a Gold Medal.

In 1946, he was deputed by the Government of Mysore to the Illinois Institute of Technology, Chicago, to study irrigation projects. He later obtained his master's degree in town planning. During his time in America, he visited various projects, broadening his practical exposure. He returned to India in 1949.

== Professional career and key appointments ==
Manickam began his professional journey with the Public Works Department (PWD) of the Government of Mysore. He served as the municipal engineer of Mysore in 1943–44. In 1949, upon returning from the U.S., he became government architect. He was later appointed director of town planning, becoming the first to hold the post in Karnataka.

He concurrently held three posts: government architect, director of town planning, and chief engineer (Communications & Buildings). He also served as a member of the City Improvement Trust Boards of Bangalore and Mysore and lectured in architecture at the University College of Engineering, Bangalore.

Professional Roles and Appointments
Role	Organization/Government Body	Period/Year
Municipal Engineer	Government of Mysore	1943–44
Government Architect	Government of Mysore/Karnataka	1949 onwards
Director of Town Planning	Government of Karnataka	Appointed 1949
Chief Engineer (Communications & Buildings)	Government of Karnataka	Later in career
Member	City Improvement Trust Boards of Bangalore and Mysore	During tenure
Architecture Lecturer	University College of Engineering, Bangalore	Ongoing

== The Vidhana Soudha: a landmark achievement ==
=== Context and vision ===
The concept for the Vidhana Soudha emerged in response to a desire for indigenous architectural identity. A Russian cultural delegation's question to Chief Minister Kengal Hanumanthaiah about Indian architecture triggered this vision. Hanumanthaiah conceived the Vidhana Soudha as a "Shilpa Kala Kavya" – a sculptural epic in stone, declaring in legislative debates: "This building must stand as Karnataka's answer to the British legacy". According to Hanumanthaiah's biographical account, he and Manickam made multiple late-night site inspections, with the Chief Minister insisting: "Every carving must tell our people's story". Jawaharlal Nehru laid the foundation stone on July 13, 1951; construction began in 1952.

=== Architectural design and style ===
Designed by Manickam Mudaliar in 1952, the building pioneered structural innovations including granite veneering on reinforced concrete domes – a technique documented as particularly challenging due to granite's thermal expansion properties. The 'Neo-Dravidian' style incorporates carved bases and capitals, deep friezes, kapotha cornices, chaithya arches, and domical finials. Manickam himself noted the design synthesized influences from the Ajanta Caves, Brihadeeswarar Temple, United States Capitol, and Rajasthani jharokhas.

=== Construction and impact ===
Construction lasted from 1952 to 1956, employing over 5,000 laborers and 1,500 artisans. Manickam described the engineering challenges: "The task was to adapt traditional stone craftsmanship to modern structural requirements while maintaining architectural purity". Over 5,000 convicts contributed to the workforce and were released upon completion. The building used specially quarried Bangalore granite and cost Rs. 1.84 crores. Legislative records show the project faced intense scrutiny, with Hanumanthaiah defending its scale as "essential for our self-respect as a free people".

== Other notable architectural and urban planning contributions ==
Manickam Mudaliar also planned major Bengaluru layouts like Jayanagar, Sadashivanagar, Jayamahal, and Indiranagar. His other works include the Bangalore Dairy, KSRTC office, and buildings for MICO, Mysore University, CFTRI, Mysore Sugars, and Karnataka Choultry at Tirumala. Contemporary accounts note his designs emphasized "functional efficiency without compromising cultural identity".

Notable architectural projects and urban planning contributions
Category	Project name	Notes/significance
Urban layouts	Jayanagar	Key residential area
	Sadashivanagar	Key residential area
	Jayamahal	Key residential area
	Indiranagar	Key residential area
Government buildings	Vidhana Soudha	Largest legislature building in India
	Multi-storeyed buildings	Government offices
	Bangalore Dairy	Government dairy facility
	KSRTC office	Transport Corporation office
Industrial/commercial buildings	MICO	Automotive industry
	State Bank of Mysore	Bank building
	Porcelain Factory	Industrial use
	CFTRI, Mysore	Research institute
	Punjab National Bank	Bank building
	Mysore Sugars	Manufacturing unit
Educational/institutional buildings	Mysore University	Campus buildings
	The Institution of Engineers (India), Karnataka State Centre	Designed by him
	Karnataka Choultry at Tirumala	Religious and institutional use

== Leadership in professional organizations ==
He served as President of the Mysore Engineers' Association (1959–1964), and Chairman of The Institution of Engineers (India), Karnataka State Centre (1961–1964). His photo was unveiled in 1964 by Dr. K. L. Rao in the Sir M. V. Auditorium. A 1967 study by the Institution documented his innovative granite veneering techniques as "revolutionary for Indian construction methods".

== Social impact and personal qualities ==
Manickam Mudaliar was known for kindness, philanthropy, and a commitment to mentoring young professionals. He helped officials secure education and jobs and served as President of the Mudaliar Sangham. Fluent in English, Kannada, Tamil, Telugu, and Urdu, he actively spoke at institutions and events. He aspired to establish an engineering university, a vision later realized through the Visvesvaraya Technological University.

== Legacy and recognition ==
The annual B. R. Manickam Memorial Lecture commemorates his legacy. His contributions to Karnataka's development were formally recognized in the Administration Reforms Commission Report (1967) as "a model of integrated infrastructure development". The Institution of Engineers notes his work "fundamentally transformed public architecture in South India".

== Death ==
Manickam died on May 31, 1964, shortly after his retirement in April 1964, at age 55. Legislative records show the assembly observed a minute of silence, with the Speaker noting: "The state has lost its chief architect in every sense".

== See also ==
- Kengal Hanumanthaiah
- Architecture of India
- Vidhana Soudha
