= Vemagal Assembly constituency =

Former Assembly constituency in Karnataka, India

Coordinates: 13.19°N 78.02°E

Vemagal
- Former constituency for the Karnataka Legislative Assembly

Constituency details
- Country: India
- Region: South India
- State: Karnataka
- District: Kolar
- Lok Sabha constituency: Kolar
- Established: 1967
- Abolished: 2008
- Reservation: None

Vemagal Assembly constituency was one of the 224 constituencies in the Karnataka Legislative Assembly of Karnataka, a southern state of India. It was also part of Kolar Lok Sabha constituency.

== Members of the Legislative Assembly ==
Election	Member	Party
1967	G. N. Gowda	Indian National Congress
1972	C. Byre Gowda	Independent politician
1978	S. Govinda Gowda	Indian National Congress
1983	C. Byre Gowda	Independent politician
1985	C. Byre Gowda	Janata Party
1989	C. Byre Gowda	Janata Party
1994	C. Byre Gowda	Janata Dal
1999	C. Byre Gowda	Janata Dal
2003 By-election (Note: Died on 29/07/2003)	Krishna Byre Gowda	AIPJD
2004	Krishna Byre Gowda	Indian National Congress

== Election results ==
=== Assembly Election 2004 ===
2004 Karnataka Legislative Assembly election : Vemagal
Party	Candidate	Votes	%	±%
INC	Krishna Byre Gowda	95,563	75.73%	▲31.14
BJP	Srirama. S. N	20,204	16.01%	New
JD(S)	Shenkaregowda. K. C	6,981	5.53%	New
JP	Sreerama	2,201	1.74%	New
Kannada Nadu Party	Satish. S	1,238	0.98%	New
Margin of victory		75,359	59.72%	▲50.92
Turnout		126,192	78.58%	▼4.46
Total valid votes		126,187		
Registered electors		160,584		▲3.98
INC gain from AIPJD		Swing	▲22.35	

=== Assembly By-election 2003 ===
2003 Karnataka Legislative Assembly by-election : Vemagal
Party	Candidate	Votes	%	±%
AIPJD	Krishna Byre Gowda	68,458	53.38%	New
INC	V. Venkatamuniyappa	57,175	44.59%	▲0.38
RPI	B. Narayanaswamy	1,461	1.14%	New
Independent	G. H. P. Rangaswamy	1,140	0.89%	New
Margin of victory		11,283	8.80%	▲1.97
Turnout		128,238	83.04%	▲3.15
Total valid votes		128,236		
Registered electors		154,436		▲7.58
AIPJD gain from JD(U)		Swing	▲2.33	

=== Assembly Election 1999 ===
1999 Karnataka Legislative Assembly election : Vemagal
Party	Candidate	Votes	%	±%
JD(U)	C. Byre Gowda	56,449	51.05%	New
INC	V. Venkatamuniyappa	48,892	44.21%	▲12.48
Independent	M. Govindappa	3,563	3.22%	New
JD(S)	M. Reddeppa	1,679	1.52%	New
Margin of victory		7,557	6.83%	▼24.95
Turnout		114,683	79.89%	▼1.98
Total valid votes		110,583		
Rejected ballots		4,100	3.58%	▲2.14
Registered electors		143,559		▲11.34
JD(U) gain from JD		Swing	▼12.46	

=== Assembly Election 1994 ===
1994 Karnataka Legislative Assembly election : Vemagal
Party	Candidate	Votes	%	±%
JD	C. Byre Gowda	66,049	63.51%	New
INC	V. Venkatamuniyappa	33,001	31.73%	▲10.36
BJP	Sathyanarayana Mahesh	3,205	3.08%	New
Margin of victory		33,048	31.78%	▲9.64
Turnout		105,564	81.87%	▲1.81
Total valid votes		103,997		
Rejected ballots		1,520	1.44%	▼3.48
Registered electors		128,938		▲12.36
JD gain from JP		Swing	▲14.65	

=== Assembly Election 1989 ===
1989 Karnataka Legislative Assembly election : Vemagal
Party	Candidate	Votes	%	±%
JP	C. Byre Gowda	42,687	48.86%	New
Independent	K. R. Erappa	23,347	26.72%	New
INC	S. Govinda Gowda	18,667	21.37%	▼16.79
Independent	C. M. Muniyappa	2,007	2.30%	New
Margin of victory		19,340	22.14%	▼1.54
Turnout		91,879	80.06%	▼1.51
Total valid votes		87,361		
Rejected ballots		4,518	4.92%	▲3.31
Registered electors		114,758		▲21.33
JP gain from JP		Swing	▼12.98	

=== Assembly Election 1985 ===
1985 Karnataka Legislative Assembly election : Vemagal
Party	Candidate	Votes	%	±%
JP	C. Byre Gowda	46,945	61.84%	▲58.12
INC	K. R. Iragappa	28,968	38.16%	▲16.99
Margin of victory		17,977	23.68%	▼27.03
Turnout		77,154	81.57%	▲2.80
Total valid votes		75,913		
Rejected ballots		1,241	1.61%	▼0.01
Registered electors		94,582		▲9.62
JP gain from Independent		Swing	▼10.04	

=== Assembly Election 1983 ===
1983 Karnataka Legislative Assembly election : Vemagal
Party	Candidate	Votes	%	±%
Independent	C. Byre Gowda	48,061	71.88%	New
INC	Muniyappa. K	14,154	21.17%	▲20.33
JP	Puttaswamachari. S	2,486	3.72%	▼36.92
Independent	Krishna Rao	583	0.87%	New
Margin of victory		33,907	50.71%	▲35.59
Turnout		67,963	78.77%	▼4.03
Total valid votes		66,863		
Rejected ballots		1,100	1.62%	▼0.46
Registered electors		86,278		▲8.35
Independent gain from INC(I)		Swing	▲16.12	

=== Assembly Election 1978 ===
1978 Karnataka Legislative Assembly election : Vemagal
Party	Candidate	Votes	%	±%
INC(I)	S. Govinda Gowda	36,000	55.76%	New
JP	C. Byre Gowda	26,239	40.64%	New
Independent	T. Narayanappa	890	1.38%	New
INC	G. H. Sriramma Reddy	544	0.84%	▼47.67
Independent	H. C. Anjappa	427	0.66%	New
Margin of victory		9,761	15.12%	▲12.15
Turnout		65,933	82.80%	▲12.94
Total valid votes		64,564		
Rejected ballots		1,369	2.08%	▲2.08
Registered electors		79,627		▲31.40
INC(I) gain from Independent		Swing	▲4.27	

=== Assembly Election 1972 ===
1972 Mysore State Legislative Assembly election : Vemagal
Party	Candidate	Votes	%	±%
Independent	C. Byre Gowda	21,258	51.49%	New
INC	S. Govinda Gowda	20,031	48.51%	▼5.25
Margin of victory		1,227	2.97%	▼11.58
Turnout		42,336	69.86%	▲5.63
Total valid votes		41,289		
Registered electors		60,598		▲16.26
Independent gain from INC		Swing	▼2.27	

=== Assembly Election 1967 ===
1967 Mysore State Legislative Assembly election : Vemagal
Party	Candidate	Votes	%	±%
INC	G. N. Gowda	17,014	53.76%	New
Independent	C. Byre Gowda	12,410	39.21%	New
Independent	S. R. R. Gowda	2,227	7.04%	New
Margin of victory		4,604	14.55%	
Turnout		33,476	64.23%	
Total valid votes		31,651		
Registered electors		52,121		
INC win (new seat)				

== See also ==
- Kolar district
- List of constituencies of Karnataka Legislative Assembly
