= Bangalore City Lok Sabha constituency =

Former constituency of the Indian parliament in Karnataka

Coordinates: 12.967389°N 77.587959°E

Bangalore City
- Former Lok Sabha constituency

Constituency details
- Country: India
- State: Mysore State
- Established: 1957
- Abolished: 1967
- Reservation: None

Bangalore City Lok Sabha constituency was a former Lok Sabha constituency in Mysore State in southern India.

== Members of Parliament ==
Year	Member	Party
Till 1957 : Constituency did not exist
1957	Keshava Iyengar	Indian National Congress
1962	Kengal Hanumanthaiah	Indian National Congress
After 1967: Constituency Abolished

== Election results ==
=== General election 1957 ===
1957 Indian general election: Bangalore City
Party	Candidate	Votes	%	±%
INC	Keshava Iyengar	89,611	58.26	+11.09
Independent	Haridranath Chattopadhyaya	46,948	30.52	N/A
ABJS	M. A. Venkat Rao	17,248	11.21	N/A
Margin of victory		42,663	27.74	−5.50
Turnout		153,807	43.33	−2.07
INC hold		Swing		

=== General election 1962 ===
1962 Indian general election: Bangalore City
Party	Candidate	Votes	%	±%
INC	K. Hanumanthaiya	118,028	55.23	−3.03
SWA	V. S. Natarajan	57,489	26.90	N/A
CPI	M. S. Krishnan	25,880	12.11	N/A
ABJS	M. A. Venkat Rao	12,309	5.76	−5.45
Margin of victory		60,539	28.33	+0.59
Turnout		219,276	55.83	+12.50
INC hold		Swing		

== See also ==
- Bangalore North Lok Sabha constituency
- Bangalore South Lok Sabha constituency
- Bangalore Lok Sabha constituency
- Bangalore Rural Lok Sabha constituency
- List of former constituencies of the Lok Sabha
