= C. M. Ibrahim =

Indian politician (born 1948)

Changaai Mangalote Ibrahim
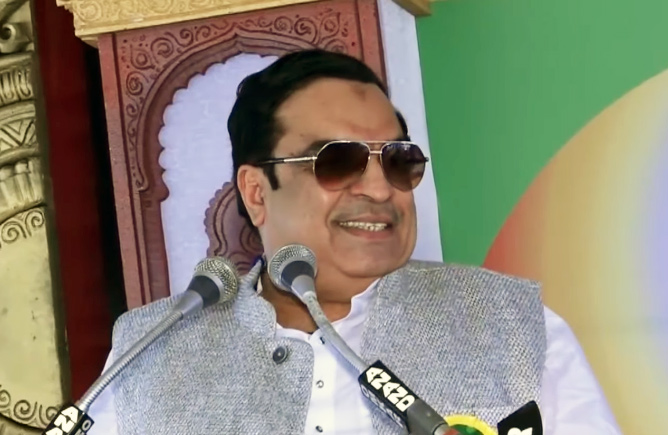
- Ibrahim addressing a rally in November 2019

State President of Janata Dal (Secular), Karnataka
- In office 2022–2023
- Preceded by: H. D. Kumaraswamy

Minister of Tourism
- In office 2 June 1996 – 22 April 1997
- Prime Minister: Deve Gowda; I. K. Gujral
- Preceded by: V. Dhananjay Kumar
- Succeeded by: Srikant Kumar Jena

Minister of Civil Aviation
- In office 22 April 1997 – 19 March 1998
- Prime Minister: I. K. Gujral
- Preceded by: Himself
- Succeeded by: Ananth Kumar

Minister of Information and Broadcasting
- In office 2 June 1996 – 1 May 1997
- Prime Minister: Deve Gowda; I. K. Gujral
- Preceded by: Sushma Swaraj
- Succeeded by: Jaipal Reddy

Member of the Karnataka Legislative Council
- In office 24 August 2017 – 5 August 2022
- Preceded by: Vimala Gowda
- Succeeded by: Baburao Chinchansur

Personal details
- Born: Chand Mahal Ibrahim; 14 August 1948 (age 78) Airani, Karnataka, India
- Party: Janata Dal (Secular)
- Other political affiliations: Indian National Congress; All India Progressive Janata Dal; Janata Party
- Occupation: Politician

Changaai Mangalote Ibrahim (born 14 August 1948) is an Indian politician and was the president of Janata Dal (Secular) Karnataka. He was formerly an Indian National Congress (INC) politician. He was a member of the Karnataka Legislative Council. He joined Janata Dal (Secular) and is serving as its State President from 17 April 2022 till he dismissed.

== Career ==
Ibrahim was said to have been first spotted in 1967 when he was 12, by the former Chief Minister of Karnataka S. Nijalingappa, where he was found giving election speeches as part of the campaign for his father's friend, who was contesting on an INC ticket. Nijalingappa entrusted him to another former Chief Minister Veerendra Patil two years later following the split of INC. It was with Patil that Ibrahim later "stayed till [the former's] death."

Upon finishing schooling, Ibrahim stayed with the INC, later shifting to the Janata Parivar alliance, winning his seat at the 1978 legislative assembly election contesting from the latter's Janata Party ticket. He shifted allegiance to INC two years after, only to quit and join the All India Progressive Janata Dal, and then the Janata Dal (Secular). He held portfolios of Civil Aviation and Tourism and Information and Broadcasting in the Deve Gowda and Gujral government, formed respectively in 1996 and 1997 at the centre. After falling out with JD(S)' leadership, he re-joined the INC in 2008.

In 2023, Ibrahim made his decision to step down prior to the convening of the JD(S) national executive committee meeting.

== Controversies ==
=== 1986 Riots ===
Karnataka Police have charged cases against him for making Hate speech which instigated riots in Bangalore and Tumkur following a controversy over title of an article that appeared in Deccan Herald on 7 December 1986. The riots caused death of 17 people.

=== TATA-Singapore Airlines controversy ===
In 1997, Ibrahim denied permission for a joint venture between the Tata Group and Singapore Airlines to operate a domestic airline in India. Ibrahim claimed that his reasons were ideological, as he was opposed to foreign investment in the Indian aviation sector. However, at the time, a senior bureaucrat accused the Aviation ministry of being "a malign influence", and there were allegations that Ibrahim was protecting the private carrier Jet Airways. On 15 November 2010, Ratan Tata, the head of the Tata group alleged that, during the 1990s, a minister had asked for a bribe of INR 15 crore (US$3.3 million approx) to clear a proposed venture with Singapore Airlines, but he had refused to pay the bribe. Although Tata did not name Ibrahim as the offending minister, sections of the media speculated that the minister Tata was referring to may have been Ibrahim. Ibrahim denied the allegation.

=== Star DTH controversy ===
As Information & Broadcasting Minister, Ibrahim denied Star Television permission to operate a Direct to Home (DTH) service in India. It was alleged that Ibrahim had overruled other ministers and was protecting the interests of Star's rival Zee Television, who he granted permission to operate a DTH network.

=== Voting bribery controversy ===
On 1 September 2010, while campaigning in his home state, Ibrahim alleged that Katta Subramanya Naidu, a politician from the rival Bharatiya Janata Party was bribing voters. He told voters: "Take the stack of currency given by Katta Subramanya Naidu without any second thought but do not fail to cast vote for Congress.".
