= C. Byre Gowda =

Indian political activist (1933–2003)

Member of Karnataka Legislative Assembly
- In office 1983–2003
- Preceded by: S. Govinda Gowda
- Succeeded by: Krishna Byre Gowda
- Constituency: Vemagal

Personal details
- Born: 12 May 1934; Chowdadenahalli, Kolar, Kingdom of Mysore
- Died: 23 July 2003 (aged 69); Bangalore, Karnataka, India
- Political party: Janata Dal (United)
- Spouse: Savitramma
- Children: 5, including Krishna Byre Gowda

Chowdadenahalli Byre Gowda (12 May 1934 – 29 July 2003) was an Indian politician who served as a cabinet minister in the State of Karnataka. He served as the Minister of Agriculture from 1996 to 1999 in the cabinet of Chief Minister J. H. Patel.

== Political career ==
Gowda represented the Vemgal Assembly segment for five consecutive terms. He was heading the All-India Progressive Janata Dal(AIPJD) faction. Gowda was a minister in three Janata Parivar Cabinets- those of Ramakrishna Hegde, H. D. Deve Gowda, and J. H. Patel. Originally from the CPI, Gowda has been an acknowledged expert on all agricultural matters and is known for his ability to talk extensively about farmers and their problems. He was a State President of Janata Dal (United) from 1999 to 2003.

== Personal life ==
Gowda was born on 12 May 1934 in Chowdadenahalli, a village in the Kolar taluk of the erstwhile Kingdom of Mysore (now part of Karnataka). His father was Chowde Gowda, a farmer, and mother Lakshmidevamma, a homemaker, and he was the eldest of their four children.

Gowda was married to Savithramma and had five children with her. One of them, Krishna Byre Gowda, is also a politician and a member of the Karnataka Legislative Assembly. He has served as a cabinet minister.

Gowda died on 29 July 2003, following a heart attack. He was 70.
