= H. T. Sangliana =

Indian politician

Dr. H.T. Sangliana
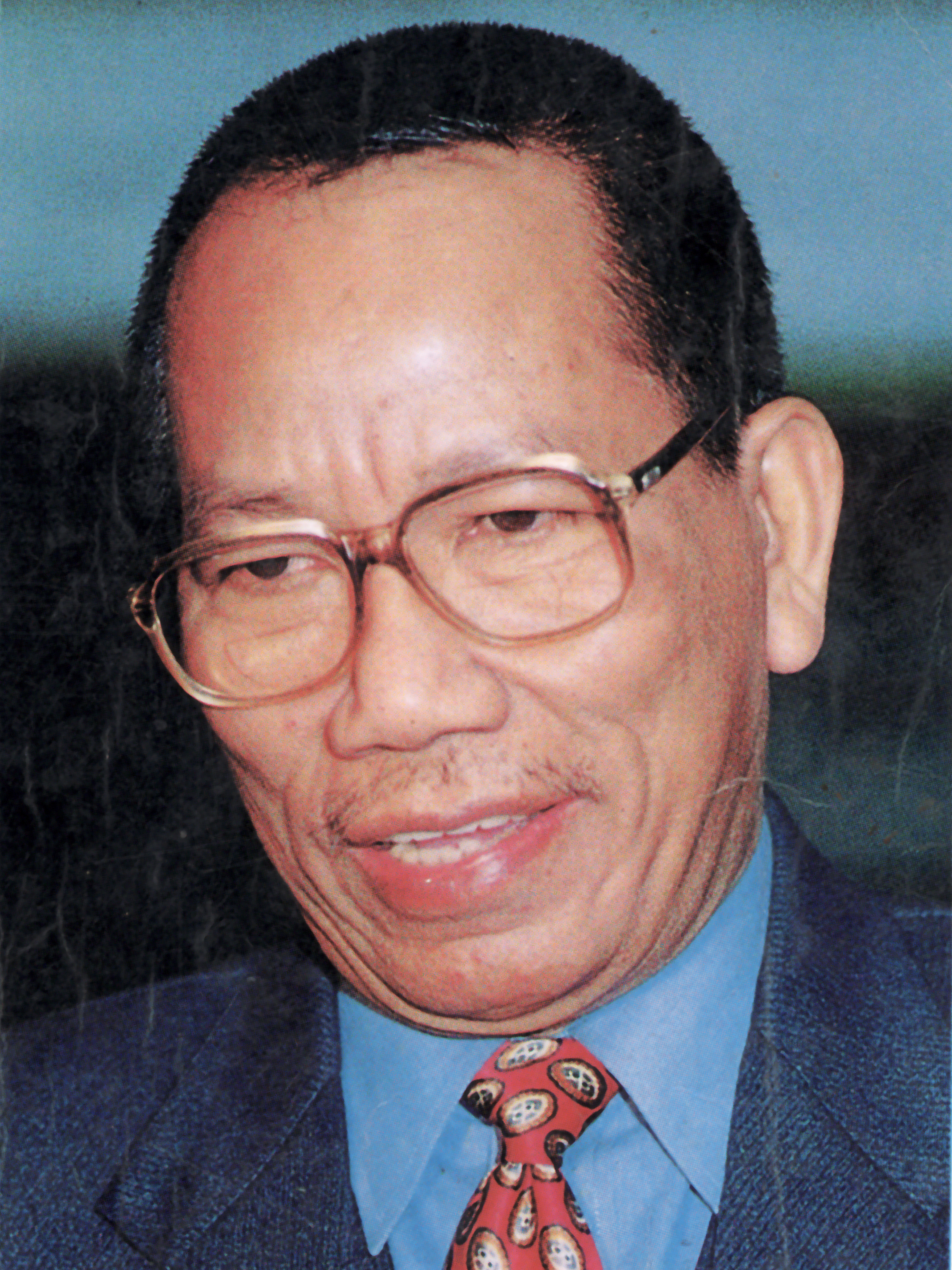
- H.T Sangliana c. 1999

MP
- In office 2004–2009
- Preceded by: C. K. Jaffer Sharief
- Succeeded by: P. C. Mohan
- Constituency: Bangalore North

Personal details
- Born: 1 June 1943 (age 83) Aizawl, Assam Province, British India (now in Mizoram, India)
- Party: BJP (2004-2008) INC (2008-2019)
- Spouse: C. Rothangpuii
- Children: 4 daughters

H. T. Sangliana (born 1 June 1943) was a member of the 14th Lok Sabha of India. He represented the Bangalore North of Karnataka from the BJP, but lost the election 15th Lok Sabha from Bangalore Central with INC. He was given the post of vice-chairperson, National Commission for Minorities, with a status equivalent to the minister of state in the central government.

He is a native of the Indian state of Mizoram and was formerly a police officer who held the post of Commissioner of Police, Bangalore City. As Deputy Commissioner of Police (Traffic) in Bangalore City, he was notable for his attempts to tackle the issue of illegal parking. He retired from the Indian Police Service after 36 years on 1 July 2003, at which time he was Director General of Police and Inspector General of Prisons.

After retiring, on invitation by (BJP) he ran for the old Bangalore North Lok Sabha constituency for the BJP and defeated 34 other candidates. He was expelled from BJP for voting in favour of civilian nuclear deal with the US for which a no-confidence motion was moved against the UPA in Lok Sabha on 22 July 2008, and then joined the Indian National Congress. He contested the newly formed Bangalore Central constituency for the INC in the 2009 Lok Sabha elections and lost to the BJP candidate, P. C. Mohan, by (59,665) votes.

Sangliana was one of 160 international delegates who joined US president-elect Barack Obama at his breakfast table on 10 February 2008. Three films have been made about Sangliana. He was portrayed as a super-cop in the Kannada movie S. P. Sangliana (1988), starring Shankar Nag and Ambareesh.
