= C. Narayanaswamy =

Politician

Chairman of Fifth Finance Commission of Karnataka
- In office 2023–2027

Member of Parliament, Lok Sabha
- In office 1996–1998
- Preceded by: C. K. Jaffer Sharief
- Succeeded by: C. K. Jaffer Sharief
- Constituency: Bangalore North

Personal details
- Born: Bengaluru, Karnataka, India
- Party: Indian National Congress (2013–present)
- Other party: Janata Party; Janata Dal (Secular) (1977–2013)
- Spouse: Geetha N. Swamy
- Children: 2
- Website: cnarayanaswamy.com

Channahalli Narayanaswamy is an Indian politician and former Member of Parliament. He currently serves as the chairman of the fifth state finance commission of the State of Karnataka.

== Political career ==
Narayanaswamy was a member of the Janata Dal (Secular), and represented Bangalore North from 1996 to 1998. He joined the Indian National Congress in 2013 and won the 2014 Lok Sabha election as the party's candidate.

In 2023, Narayanaswamy appointed as head of the fifth state finance commission.
