= Bangalore Lok Sabha constituency =

Former constituency of the Indian parliament in Karnataka

Coordinates: 12.967389°N 77.587959°E

Bangalore
- Former Lok Sabha constituency

Constituency details
- Country: India
- State: Mysore State
- Established: 1967
- Abolished: 1977
- Reservation: None

Bangalore Lok Sabha constituency was a former Lok Sabha constituency in Mysore State in southern India.

== Members of Parliament ==
Year	Member	Party
Till 1957 : Constituency did not exist
1957	H. C. Dasappa	Indian National Congress
1962	H. C. Dasappa	Indian National Congress
1967	Kengal Hanumanthaiah	Indian National Congress
1971	Kengal Hanumanthaiah	Indian National Congress
After 1977: Constituency Abolished

== Election results ==
=== General election 1967 ===
1967 Indian general election: Bangalore
Party	Candidate	Votes	%	±%
INC	K. Hanumanthaiya	130,814	47.87	−7.36
Independent	T. Subramanya	80,194	29.34	N/A
Independent	S. R. M. Ahmad	34,239	12.53	N/A
Independent	G. Rangaswamy	28,047	10.26	N/A
Margin of victory		50,620	18.53	−9.80
Turnout		282,182	52.13	−3.70
INC hold		Swing		

=== General election 1971 ===
1971 Indian general election: Bangalore
Party	Candidate	Votes	%	±%
INC	K. Hanumanthaiya	181,819	65.13	+17.26
ABJS	M. Gopala Krishna Adiga	77,789	27.87	N/A
CPI	M. S. Krishnan	6,914	2.48	N/A
Independent	S. R. Mukhtar Ahmed	4,371	1.57	−10.96
Independent	L. Krishna Murthy	2,137	0.77	N/A
Independent	S. Clement	1,795	0.64	N/A
Independent	C. S. Gundappa	1,490	0.53	N/A
Independent	R. Shanmugam	1,321	0.47	N/A
Independent	C. Krishna	397	0.14	N/A
Independent	G. Rangaswamy	319	0.11	−10.15
Independent	T. Dorairaj	307	0.11	N/A
Independent	S. N. Sastry	183	0.07	N/A
Independent	H. Y. S. Devaru	163	0.06	N/A
Independent	Krishna Kant Mishra	154	0.06	N/A
Margin of victory		104,030	37.26	+18.73
Turnout		282,994	45.27	−6.86
INC hold		Swing		

== See also ==
- Bangalore North Lok Sabha constituency
- Bangalore South Lok Sabha constituency
- Bangalore City Lok Sabha constituency
- Bangalore Rural Lok Sabha constituency
- List of former constituencies of the Lok Sabha
