= Byatarayanapura Assembly constituency =

Constituency of the Karnataka legislative assembly in India

Coordinates: 13.060°N 77.594°E

Byatarayanapura
- Constituency No. 152 for the Karnataka Legislative Assembly

Constituency details
- Country: India
- Region: South India
- State: Karnataka
- District: Bangalore Urban
- Lok Sabha constituency: Bangalore North
- Established: 2008
- Total electors: 5,08,799 (2023)
- Reservation: None

Member of Legislative Assembly
- 16th Karnataka Legislative Assembly
- Incumbent Krishna Byre Gowda
- Party: Indian National Congress
- Elected year: 2023

Byatarayanapura Assembly constituency is Assembly constituency under Bangalore North Lok Sabha constituency. Krishna Byre Gowda is currently the sitting MLA.

== Members of Legislative Assembly ==
Year	Member	Party
Before 2008: Constituency did not exist
2008	Krishna Byre Gowda	Indian National Congress
2013	Krishna Byre Gowda	Indian National Congress
2018	Krishna Byre Gowda	Indian National Congress
2023	Krishna Byre Gowda	Indian National Congress

== Election results ==
=== Assembly Election 2023 ===
2023 Karnataka Legislative Assembly election : Byatarayanapura
Party	Candidate	Votes	%	±%
INC	Krishna Byre Gowda	160,182	54.43%	▲9.12
BJP	Thammesh Gowda H. C	121,978	41.45%	▼1.63
JD(S)	Nagaraj Gowda. P	4,365	1.48%	▼7.38
NOTA	None of the above	2,383	0.81%	▼0.04
Margin of victory		38,204	12.98%	▲10.74
Turnout		294,894	57.96%	▲0.33
Total valid votes		294,274		
Registered electors		508,799		▲15.53
INC hold		Swing	▲9.12	

=== Assembly Election 2018 ===
2018 Karnataka Legislative Assembly election : Byatarayanapura
Party	Candidate	Votes	%	±%
INC	Krishna Byre Gowda	114,964	45.31%	▲3.79
BJP	A. Ravi	109,293	43.08%	▲15.55
JD(S)	Chandra. T. G	22,490	8.86%	▼9.00
NOTA	None of the above	2,154	0.85%	New
Margin of victory		5,671	2.24%	▼11.75
Turnout		253,817	57.63%	▼5.43
Total valid votes		253,709		
Registered electors		440,396		▲33.28
INC hold		Swing	▲3.79	

=== Assembly Election 2013 ===
2013 Karnataka Legislative Assembly election : Byatarayanapura
Party	Candidate	Votes	%	±%
INC	Krishna Byre Gowda	96,125	41.52%	▼1.49
BJP	A. Ravi	63,725	27.53%	▼8.88
JD(S)	Hanumante Gowda	41,360	17.86%	▲2.63
KJP	K. Manjunath	1,781	0.77%	New
Margin of victory		32,400	13.99%	▲7.39
Turnout		208,380	63.06%	▲9.84
Total valid votes		231,515		
Registered electors		330,426		▲24.02
INC hold		Swing	▼1.49	

=== Assembly Election 2008 ===
2008 Karnataka Legislative Assembly election : Byatarayanapura
Party	Candidate	Votes	%	±%
INC	Krishna Byre Gowda	60,979	43.01%	New
BJP	A. Ravi	51,627	36.41%	New
JD(S)	C Narayanaswamy	21,598	15.23%	New
BSP	P Appaiah	3,728	2.63%	New
Margin of victory		9,352	6.60%	
Turnout		141,793	53.22%	
Total valid votes		141,782		
Registered electors		266,428		
INC win (new seat)				

== See also ==
- List of constituencies of Karnataka Legislative Assembly
- Bangalore North Lok Sabha Constituency
