= Vikasa Soudha =

- Location within Karnataka Location within India

General information
- Architectural style: Neo-Dravidian Architecture
- Location: India
- Coordinates: 12.9783°N 77.5893°E
- Cost: ₹ 150 Crores
- Owner: Government of Karnataka

Technical details
- Grounds: 8 acres

The Vikasa Soudha is the seat of various government and legislative offices of the Government of Karnataka. It is situated on the Dr. Ambedkar Road of Seshadripuram, on the north western end of Cubbon Park and South of the Vidhana Soudha. It is popularly known as the ‘Sister of Vidhana Soudha’ due to its strong resemblance to the Vidhana Soudha. Construction of the building started during the tenure of Chief Minister S. M. Krishna and it was inaugurated in February 2005, with the purpose of serving as an annexe building, housing some ministries and legislative offices.

== Description ==
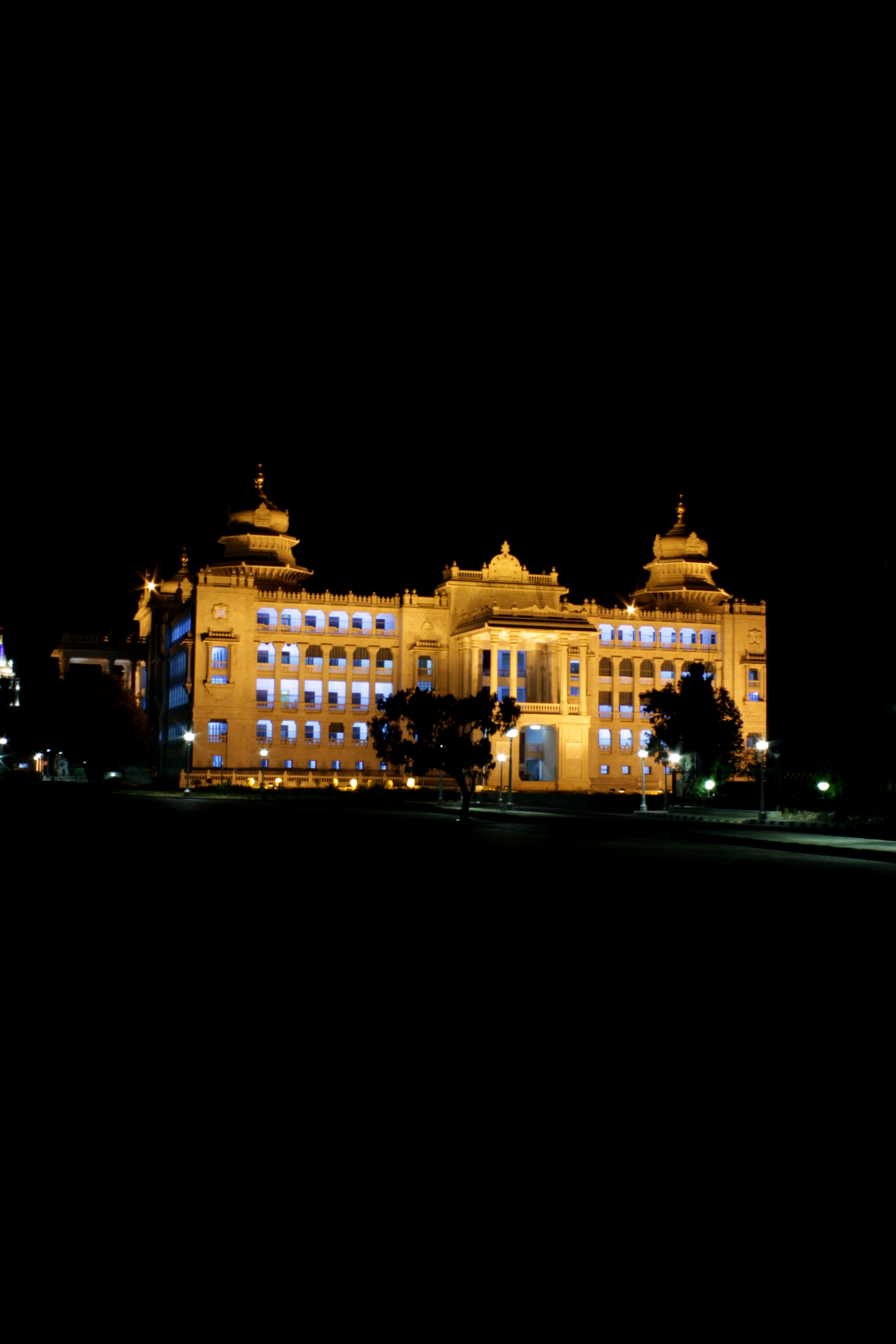
Vikasa Soudha at night

It was constructed in Neo-Dravidian Architecture. The building has eight floors, with fifteen conference halls and 360 rooms. The main hall has a colourful map of the State of Karnataka. In 2009, a large mural was installed by the Yediyurappa administration. It was created by artist J. Shivakumar, it depicts the history of Karnataka, its present and future. It was created using copper, bronze and fiberglass.
