= Tulasidas Dasappa =

Indian politician (1929–2005)

Member of Parliament, Lok Sabha
- In office 1967–1980
- Preceded by: M. Shankaraiya
- Succeeded by: M. Rajasekara Murthy
- Constituency: Mysore

Personal details
- Born: 16 July 1929 Bangalore, Kingdom of Mysore, British India
- Died: 20 April 2005 (aged 75) Bangalore, India
- Party: Indian National Congress
- Spouse: Saroja
- Children: 3
- Parent(s): H. C. Dasappa; Yashodhara Dasappa

Tulasidas Dasappa (16 July 1929 – 20 April 2005) was an Indian politician. He was elected to the Lok Sabha, lower house of the Parliament of India from the Mysore constituency in Karnataka in 1967,1971 and 1977 as a member of the Indian National Congress. He was Union Minister of State for Coal and Mines in the Charan Singh Ministry. He was the son of H. C. Dasappa and Yashodhara Dasappa, both former ministers and Indian independence activists.
