= Airani =

Coordinates: 14°36′N 75°48′E

- village
- Airani is in Haveri district
- Interactive map of Airani
- Country: India
- State: Karnataka
- District: Haveri
- Talukas: Ranibennur

Government
  - Body: Village Panchayat

Languages
  - Official: Kannada
- Time zone: UTC+5:30 (IST)
- Nearest city: Ranebennur
- Civic agency: Village Panchayat

Airani is a village in the southern state of Karnataka, India. It is located in the Ranibennur taluk of Haveri district in Karnataka.

== See also ==
- Ranebennur
- Haveri
- Districts of Karnataka
