= Yashodhara Dasappa =

Indian independence activist

- Born: 28 May 1905; Bangalore, British India
- Died: 1980
- Education: Queen Mary's College
- Occupations: Social reformer Politician; Indian independence activist Gandhian
- Spouse: H. C. Dasappa
- Children: Ramdas Dsappa, Tulasidas Dasappa, Prabha Mohan Champa
- Awards: Padma Bhushan

Yashodhara Dasappa (1905-1980) was an Indian independence activist, Gandhian, social reformer and a Minister in the state of Karnataka. She was politically aligned with the Indian National Congress and served as a Minister in the Karnataka state governments headed by S. R. Kanthi (1962) and S. Nijalingappa (1969).

== Personal life ==
Yashodhara Dasappa was born on May 28, 1905, in Bangalore to a Vokkaliga family. She was the daughter of K.H.Ramaiah, a well-known social worker, important founder of vokkaligara sangha. Despite being born in a well-to-do family chose to become a social activist and join the Indian freedom struggle. She was a student of London Mission School and later in Queen Mary's College in Madras. Yashodara was married to H. C. Dasappa, a former minister in the ministry under Jawaharlal Nehru and the younger son of the couple, Tulasidas Dasappa, was a Union Minister of state, in the Charan Singh ministry.

She died in 1980 with a Padma Bhushan award in her name.

== Political career ==
She was reported to have been active in the Indian independence struggle as well as several social movements such as the Forest Satyagraha Movement of the 1930s which resulted in the imprisonment of over 1200 people, and the Vidurashwatha episode of 1938 where 35 people were killed in a police firing. For partaking in this movement, she was jailed.

Her home was a meeting point for underground Satyagrahi (independence struggle) activity. She wrote and gave many aggressive speeches against the government when it decided to name a building after Hamilton, who was known for his brutality against the protesters agitating for freedom.

While serving as a senior minister in the Nijalingappa ministry, she made news by resigning from the post in protest against the lifting of prohibition in the state of Karnataka. The Government of India awarded her the third highest civilian honour of the Padma Bhushan, in 1972, for her contributions to society.

== See also ==
- H. C. Dasappa
- Tulasidas Dasappa
