= Vidhana Soudha =

Seat of legislature of Karnataka State

- Vidhāna Saudha
- Vidhana Soudha as seen from Dr. B. R. Ambedkar Road

- Location within Bengaluru

General information
- Type: Legislative building
- Architectural style: Neo-Dravidian
- Location: Ambedkar Veedhi, Sampangi Rama Nagara, Bengaluru, Karnataka 560001, India
- Coordinates: 12.9796°N 77.5906°E
- Groundbreaking: 13 July 1951
- Construction started: 1952
- Completed: 1956 (70 years ago)
- Inaugurated: 1956 (70 years ago)
- Cost: ₹14.8 million (US$160,000)
- Owner: Government of Karnataka

Height
- Height: 46 m (150 ft)

Dimensions
- Diameter: 61 metres (200 ft) wide and the central dome, 18 metres (60 ft) in diameter

Technical details
- Material: Granite
- Floor count: 4 + 1 basement
- Floor area: 51,144 m^{2} (550,505 sq ft)

Design and construction
- Architect: B.R. Manickam
- Engineer: B.R. Manickam
- Main contractor: KPWD

Other information
- Number of rooms: 172
- Public transit: Purple Vidhana Soudha metro station

Vidhana Soudha (also spelled Vidhāna Saudha; lit. Legislative House) is a building in Bengaluru, India. It serves as the seat of bicameral legislature comprising the Karnataka Legislative Assembly and the Karnataka Legislative Council. It is constructed in Neo-Dravidian style and was completed in 1956.

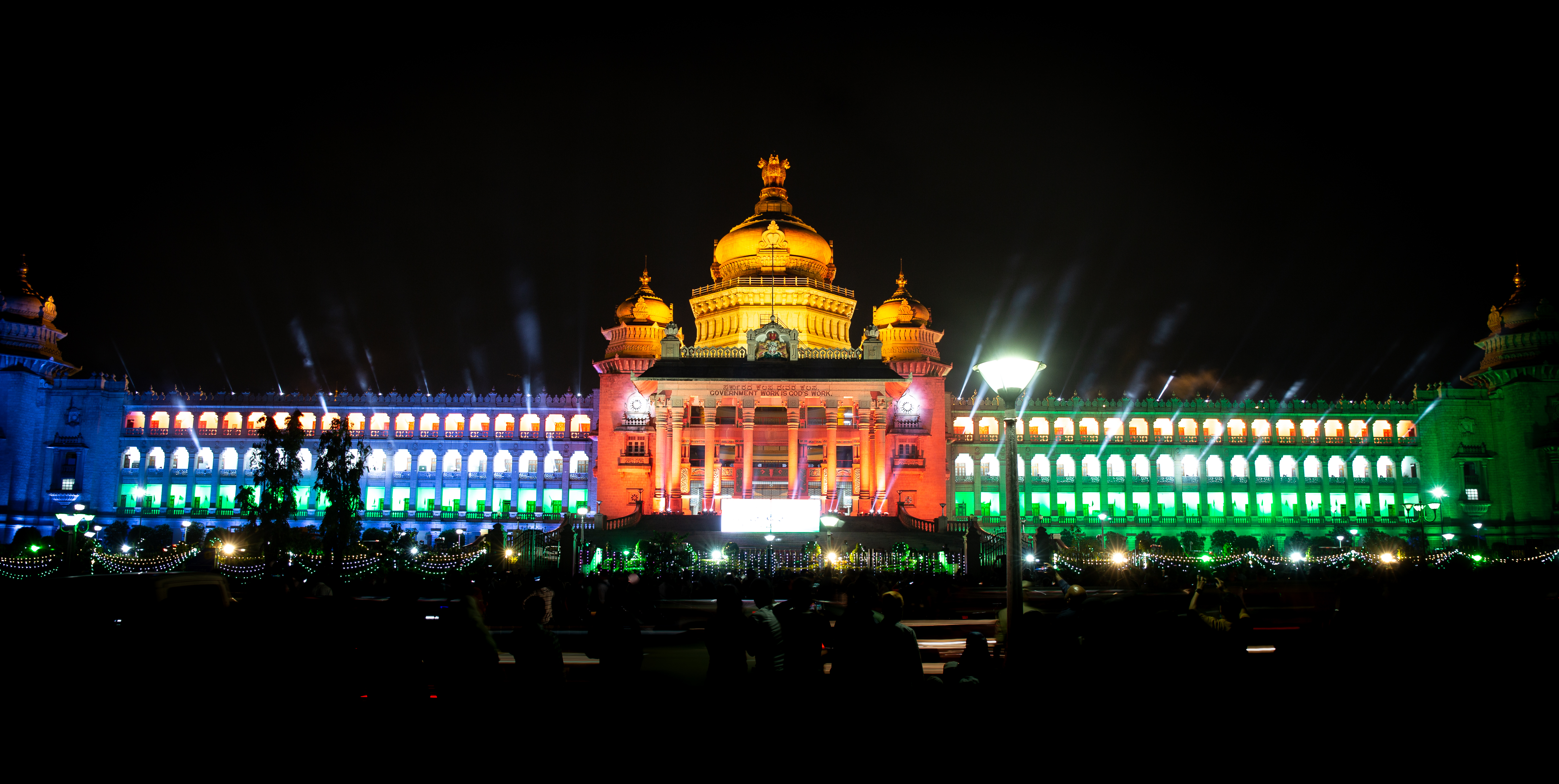
A view of the Vidhana Soudha at night with lighting

== History ==
=== Early background ===
The legislative institutions of the former Kingdom of Mysore were established in the late nineteenth and early twentieth centuries.

After the Fourth Anglo-Mysore War, the British administration utilized Tipu Sultan's palace as the secretariat office.

The two houses of legislature of the princely state of Mysore, the legislative assembly and the legislative council, were established in 1881 and 1907 respectively. Sessions of the two houses took place in Mysore with joint sessions taking place in the Bangalore Town Hall.

In the 19th century, during the period of British Commissioners Sir Mark Cubbon and Lewin Bentham Bowring, the palace was reportedly in poor condition. The palace could not accommodate the expanding administrative staff, leading to the construction of Attara Kacheri in 1867, which housed the general and revenue secretariat of the state.

=== Planning and Foundation ===
After India's independence on 15 August 1947, Bengaluru became the capital of Mysore State, with the two houses temporarily moving into Attara Kacheri, a British-built building in Cubbon Park that housed the High Court of Mysore.

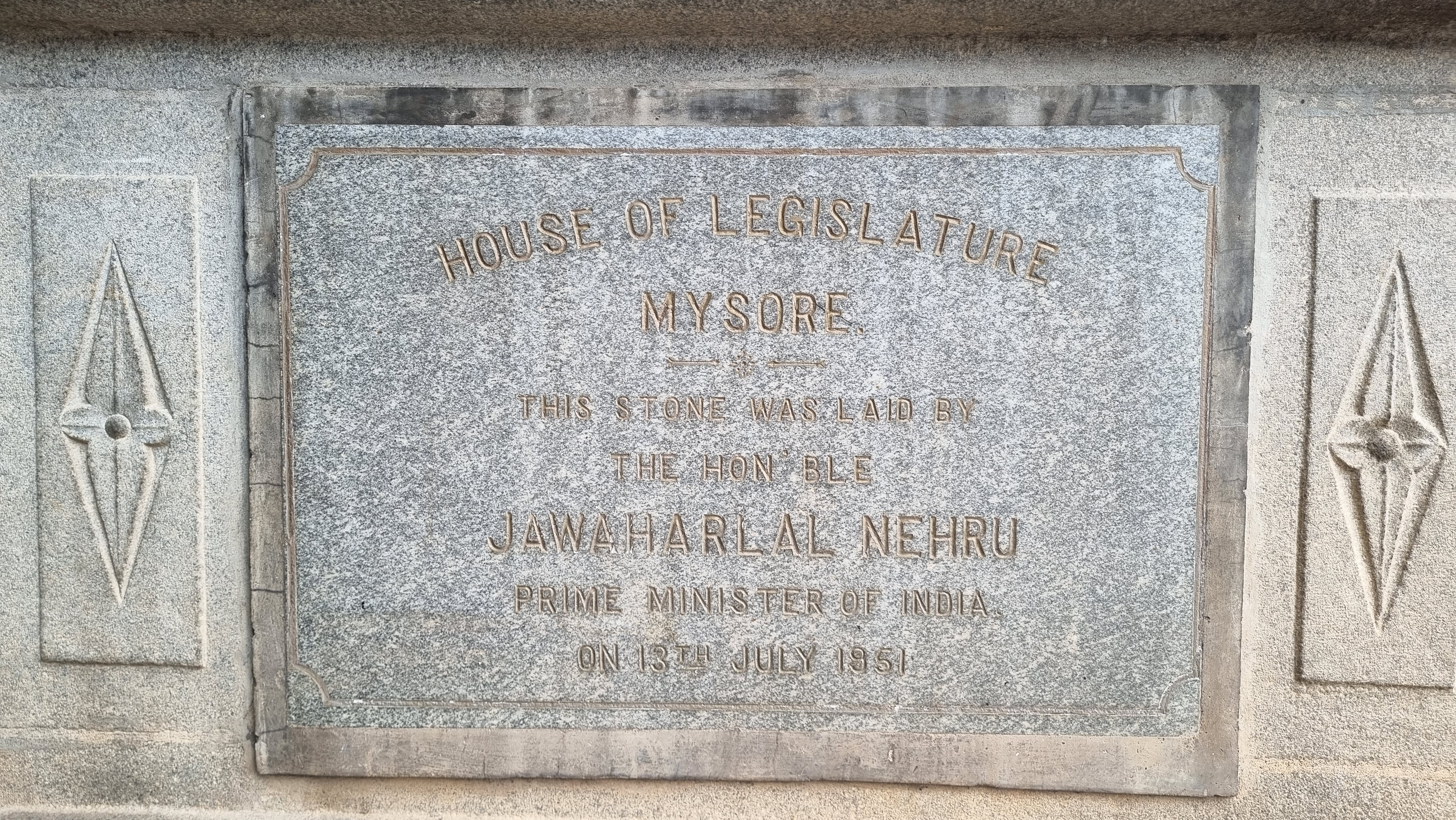
Foundation stone of the Vidhana Soudha at the East Entrance.

Later, the State Government sought to establish a new legislative building. Chief Minister Kengal Hanumanthaiah advocated for a structure rooted in indigenous architectural traditions, viewing the Attara Kacheri as representative of colonial authority.

With the need for a more spacious quarters, a new building with two floors to accommodate both the houses was planned and the foundation stone of the building was laid by Jawaharlal Nehru, the first Prime Minister of India on 13 July 1951 during the tenure of Sri K.C. Reddy, the first Chief Minister of Karnataka, then Mysore state, (1947-1952).

Historians have linked the design of Vidhana Soudha to two historical events. In 1954, the Soviet diplomats raised questions about the dominant presence of European architecture in the city to Chief Minister Kengal Hanumanthaiah during their official visit to Bengaluru. Winston Churchill’s 1931 remark on Mahatma Gandhi, describing him as a “half-naked fakir striding up the viceregal steps,” led the State Government to choose a Dravidian-style architecture for the new legislative building.

Kengal Hanumanthaiah, who was elected as chief minister of Mysore state after the 1952 election revised the plan. The new plan included accommodating other government offices, archives, a library and a banquet hall in the same building with artistic elements added representing the tradition of Mysore state. The revised plan was sanctioned on 23 April 1952. The revised design was then approved by the cabinet. Sir Arcot Narayanaswamy served as the principal supervisor of the Vidhana Soudha project. The final plan for the construction was prepared under the leadership of the Chief Engineer, B. R. Manickam.

The project attracted criticism from opposition leaders, who accused the government of excessive spending. Subsequently, an Inquiry Committee headed by a retired judge, P. P. Deo, was appointed to examine the claims.

Kengal Hanumanthaiah resigned as Chief Minister in 1956 for political reasons and was later re-elected as a member of the Legislative Assembly after the unification of Karnataka State.

According to The New Indian Express, Kengal Hanumanthaiah wanted the building to represent democratic institutions such as the British House of Commons and the United States Capitol.

After the unification of state in 1957, the Legislative Assembly had 208 members. The strength was later increased to 216 in 1967 and to 224 in 1978, while the Legislative Council expanded from 63 members in 1957 to 75 members in 1987.

Scholars and commentators have described Vidhana Soudha as a symbol of democratic governance, in contrast to the Mysore Palace, which is often associated with royal authority during the pre-independence period.

== Construction ==
Chief Minister Kengal Hanumanthaiah envisioned Vidhana Soudha as a government building that would serve the people, and he described it as a “people’s palace” to reflect its democratic character. Vidhana Soudha was designed by the chief engineers B. R. Manickam and Muniappa. Construction commenced in 1952 and was completed in 1956. The project was executed by the Public Works Department without private contractors.

According to the report, Vidhana Soudha's dome was sculpted by Sri Siddalinga Swami and later completed by his son Nagendra Stapati.

=== Cost ===
Estimates of construction costs for the original two-storied structure stood at ₹33 lakh (US$35,000) with the final cost of construction of the redesigned building being ₹1.8 crore (US$190,000).

=== Workers ===
The construction of the building involved more than 5,000 workers being employed. Some of them were prisoners who were released after completing the work. The construction of Vidhana Soudha employed 1,500 chisellers, masons and wood carvers.

== Architecture ==
Vidhana Soudha is an example of Neo-Dravidian architecture and incorporates elements from several Indian sources, including pillars inspired by the Mysore Palace, temple-style columns of the Bhoganandishwara Temple, and window and door shades influenced by Kumara Krupa.

Vidhana Soudha also incorporates architectural elements associated with Chalukya, Hoysala, and Vijayanagara traditions. The architecture of Vidhana Soudha is a blend of Dravidian and Indo-Saracenic styles (Hindu & Mughal Styles). The Jharokhas and the audience balconies incorporated in the structure are a part of Rajasthani architecture. The central dome is crowned by the Lion Capital of Ashoka, sculpted by Shilpi Shamachar.

=== Materials ===
The building is constructed primarily of granite sourced from within Karnataka, transported from Magadi (pink granites) and Turuvekere(black granites). Wooden doors made of teakwood and sandalwood.The granite used in the construction was brought from the regions of Mallasandra and Hesaraghatta.

=== Size ===
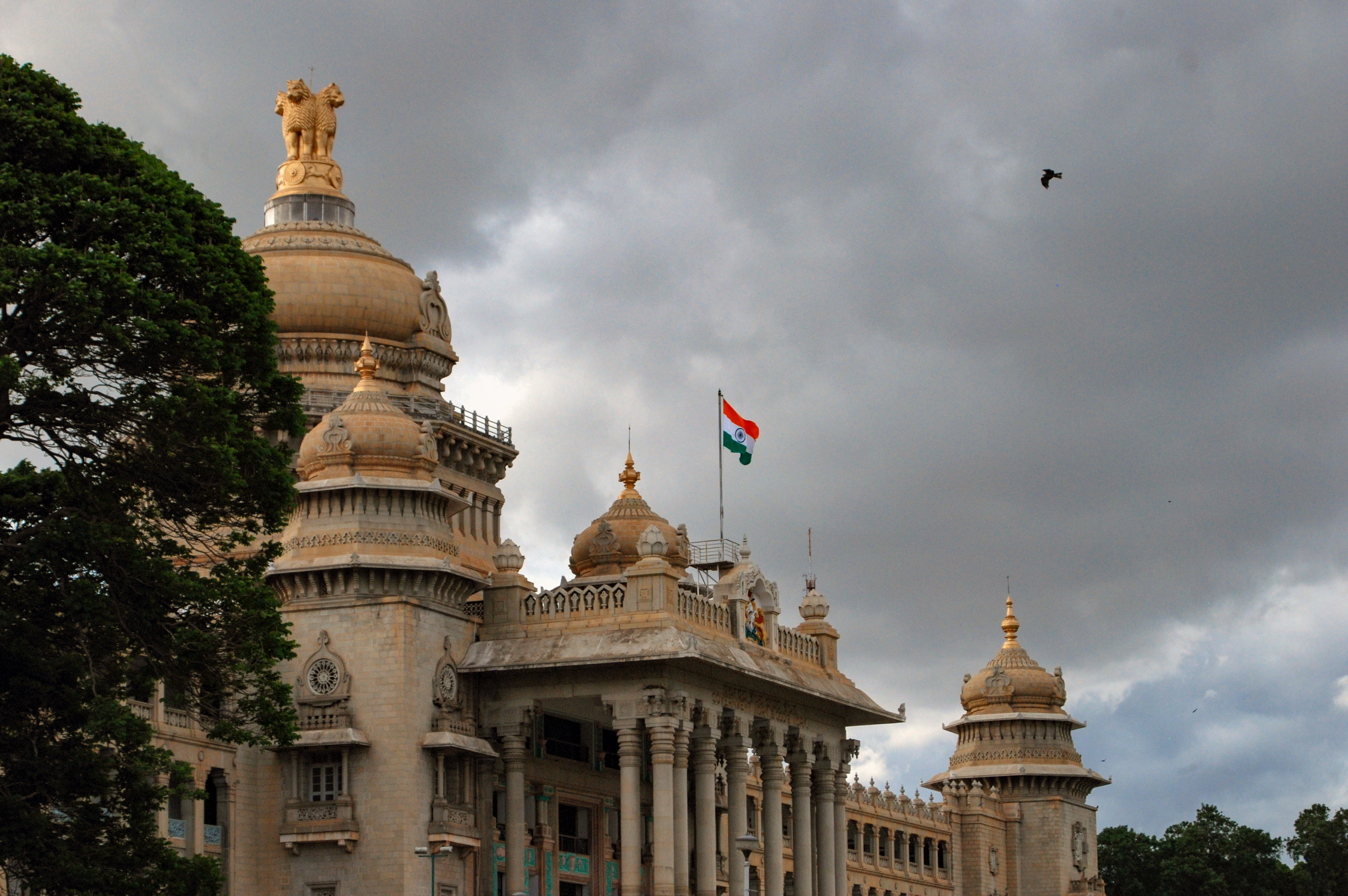
Domes, Vidhana Soudha

The building layout measures approximately 700 feet from north to south and 350 feet from east to west, on the ground and is 53.34 metres (175.0 ft) tall with an east-facing front facade with 12 granite columns, 12 metres (40 ft) tall. Leading to the porch is a flight of stairs with 45 steps, more than 61 metres (200 ft) wide and the central dome, 18 metres (60 ft) in diameter, is crowned by a likeness of the State Emblem of India.

Deccan Herald covers the fact that, Vidhana Soudha is spread over 60 acres making it the largest state legislature and secretariat building in India.

Emblem of India atop Vidhana Soudha, with the National Flag, Emblem of Karnataka, and the entablature inscribed ‘Government Work is God’s Work’.

Vidhana Soudha has total plinth area of1,32,600sqft. The total floor area is above 4,87,700 ft. Vidhana Soudha assembly hall measures 125 ft by 132 ft which is located in first floor of the central wing. The assembly hall can accommodate 254 people. For future prospects the accommodation can be increased to 100 more.

The Legislative Council Hall is located in the southern wing and measures 100 feet by 78 feet, with a height of about 40 feet. It has seating capacity for 88 members, and the visitors’ galleries can accommodate around 250 people.

Deccan Herald stated that Vidhana Soudha has 172 rooms, the chief minister office is the largest.

=== Entablature ===
The phrase Government Work is God's Work and its Kannada equivalent Sarkarada kelasa devara kelasa (in Kannada script as "ಸರ್ಕಾರದ ಕೆಲಸ ದೇವರ ಕೆಲಸ") are inscribed on the entablature. In 1957, the Mysore government planned to replace the inscription with Satyameva Jayate at a cost of ₹7,500 (equivalent to ₹820,000 or US$8,800 in 2026) but the change did not take place.

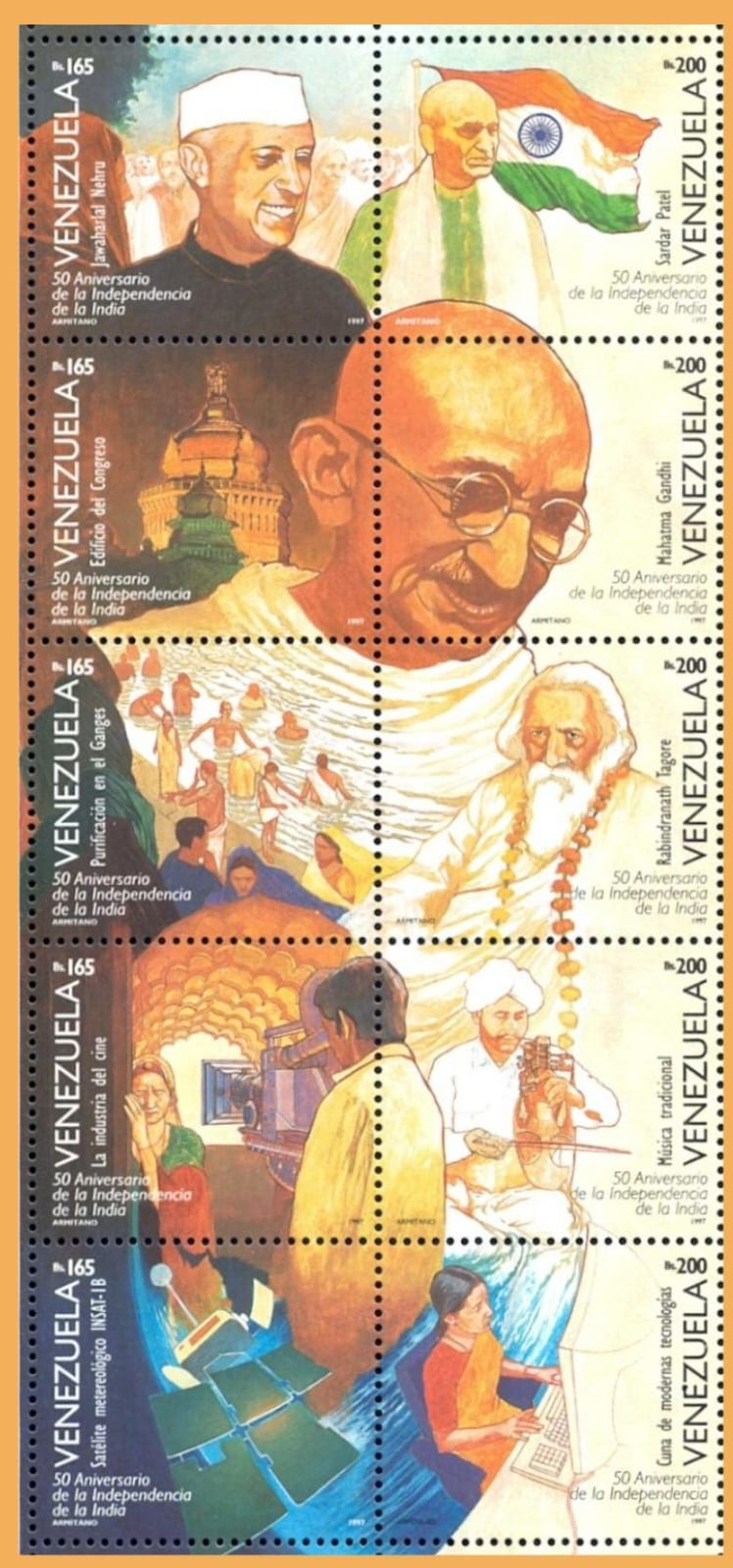
1997 Venezuelan stamp sheet commemorating 50 years of India’s independence, featuring Vidhana Soudha (background). Highlights India’s democracy, culture, and progress.

=== Paintings ===
The interior paintings of Vidhana Soudha were created by artist A. P. Rao in 1956. Floral motifs painted on the walls include representation of phala pushpa (lotus) and hooballi (floral patterns).

=== Wood Works ===
Mysore teak wood was used for the windows and doors, while sandalwood and betel wood were employed in selected interior features. Sandalwood was used for the main doors of the Cabinet Room, crafted by artisans from the Malnadu region.

== Cultural and International Significance ==
According to Jawaharlal Nehru, Vidhana Soudha is a “temple dedicated to the nation.” Chief Minister Kengal Hanumanthaiah envisioned it as a “people’s palace,” highlighting its democratic character, while Kannada poet Kuvempu described it as “poetry in stone,” capturing its architectural and cultural significance.

The construction of Vidhana Soudha attracted international attention. The visiting dignitaries included the Yugoslav President Josip Broz Tito (1955), the Shah and Queen of Iran (1953), Soviet leaders Nikita Khrushchev and Nikolai Bulganin (1955), the European artist Svetoslav Roerich (1955), and United Nations Secretary-General Dag Hammarskjöld (1956).

In 2025, the Government of Karnataka revised its public access policy, introducing structured guided tours and allowing public entry to designated interior spaces of Vidhana Soudha.

== Similar Buildings ==
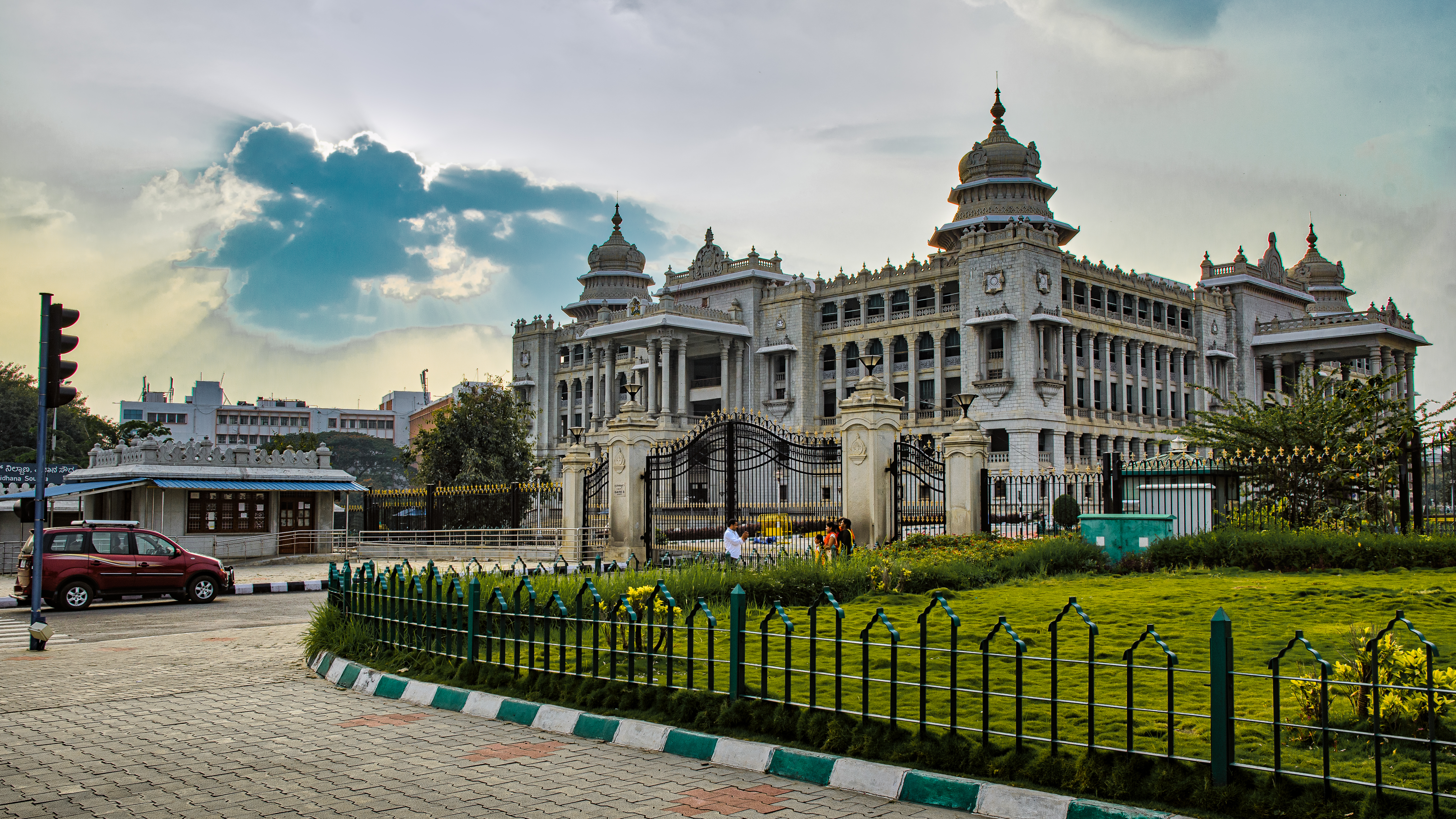
Vikasa Soudha, Bengaluru

=== Vikasa Soudha ===
Government of Karnataka constructed a similar building named Vikasa Soudha to the south of Vidhana Soudha. Initiated by the then chief minister S. M. Krishna and inaugurated in February 2005, it was intended to be an annexe building, housing some of the ministries and legislative offices.

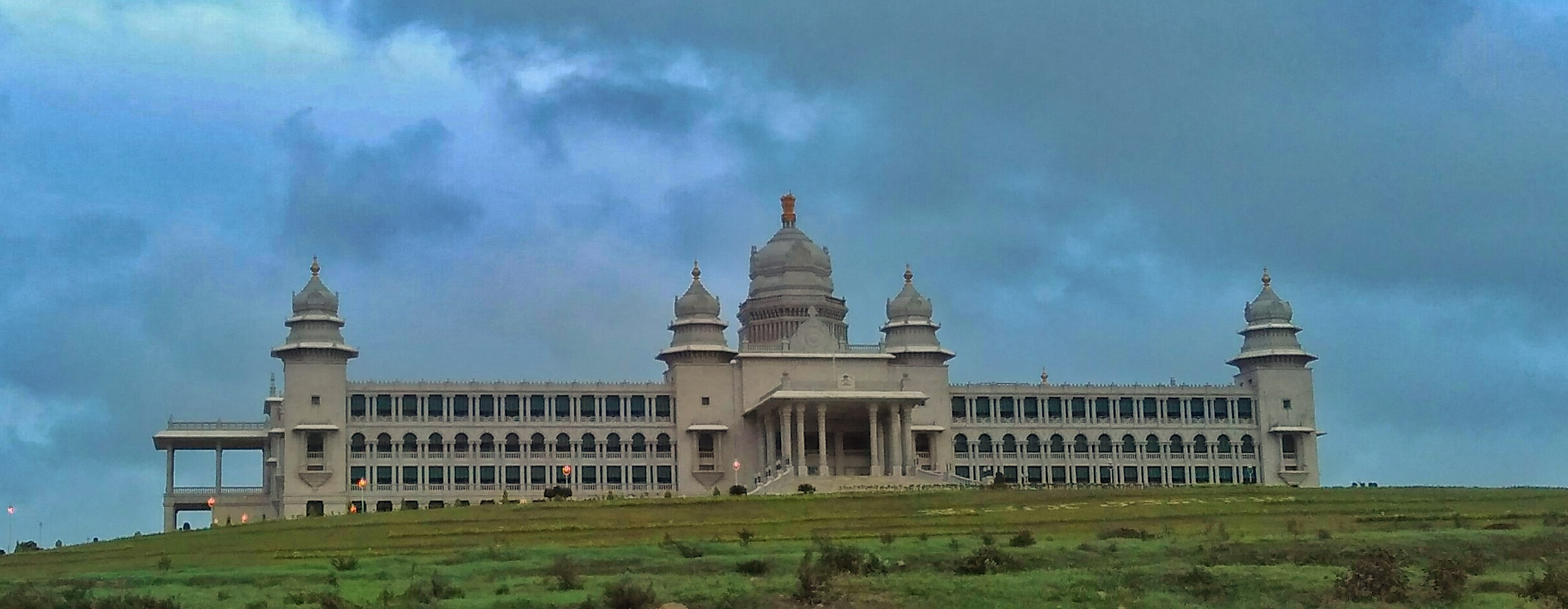
Suvarna Soudha, Belagavi

=== Suvarna Vidhana Soudha ===
Suvarna Vidhana Soudha (lit. 'Golden Legislative House') is a building in Belgaum in Northern Karnataka which was inaugurated on 11 October 2012 by then President Pranab Mukherjee. The building serves as an alternate to Vidhana Soudha and hosts the state legislature.

== Gallery ==
Commemorative and philatelic depictions of Vidhana Soudha

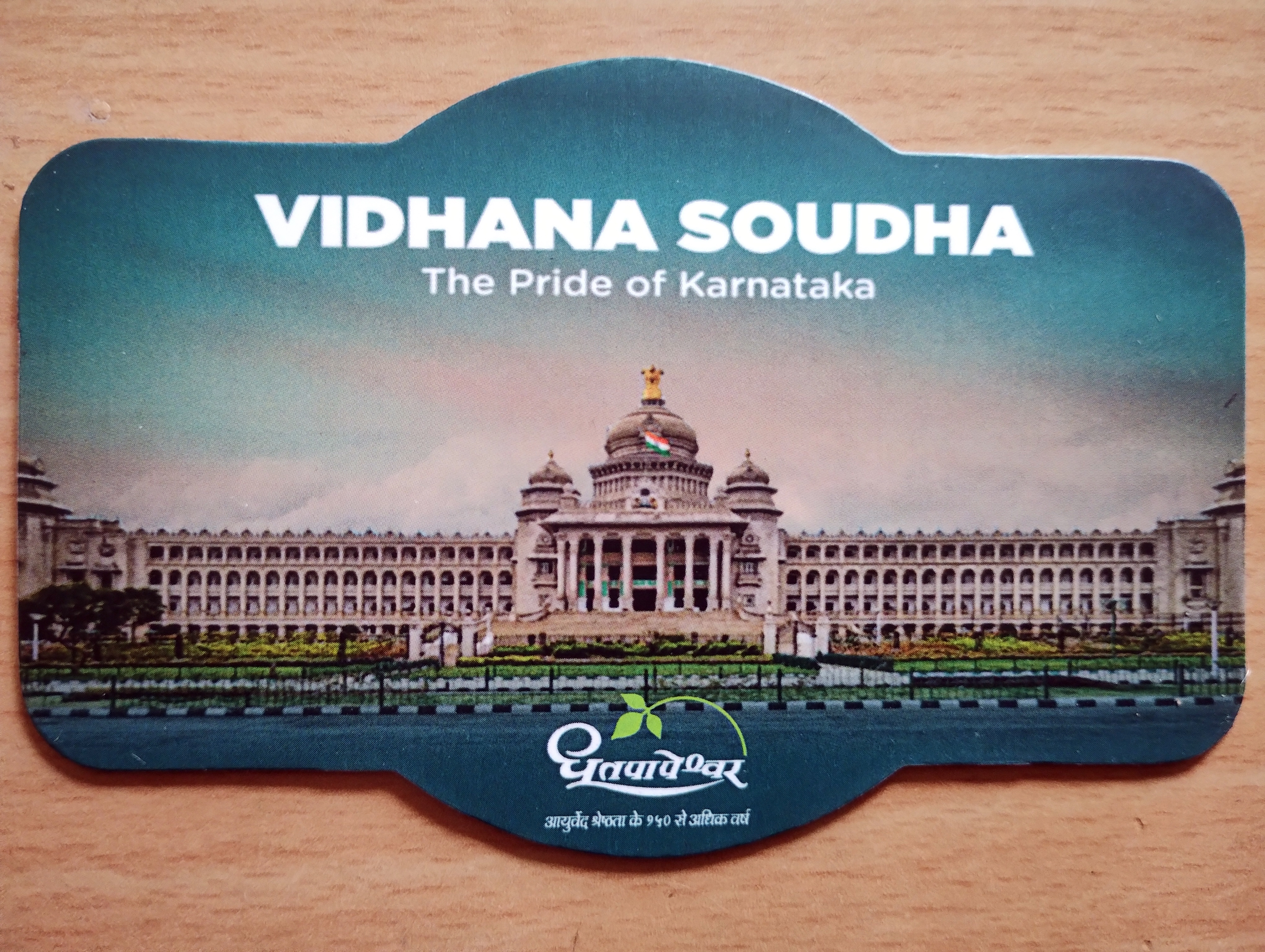
Vidhana Soudha sticker at 2nd Ayurveda World Summit, Palace grounds, Bangalore

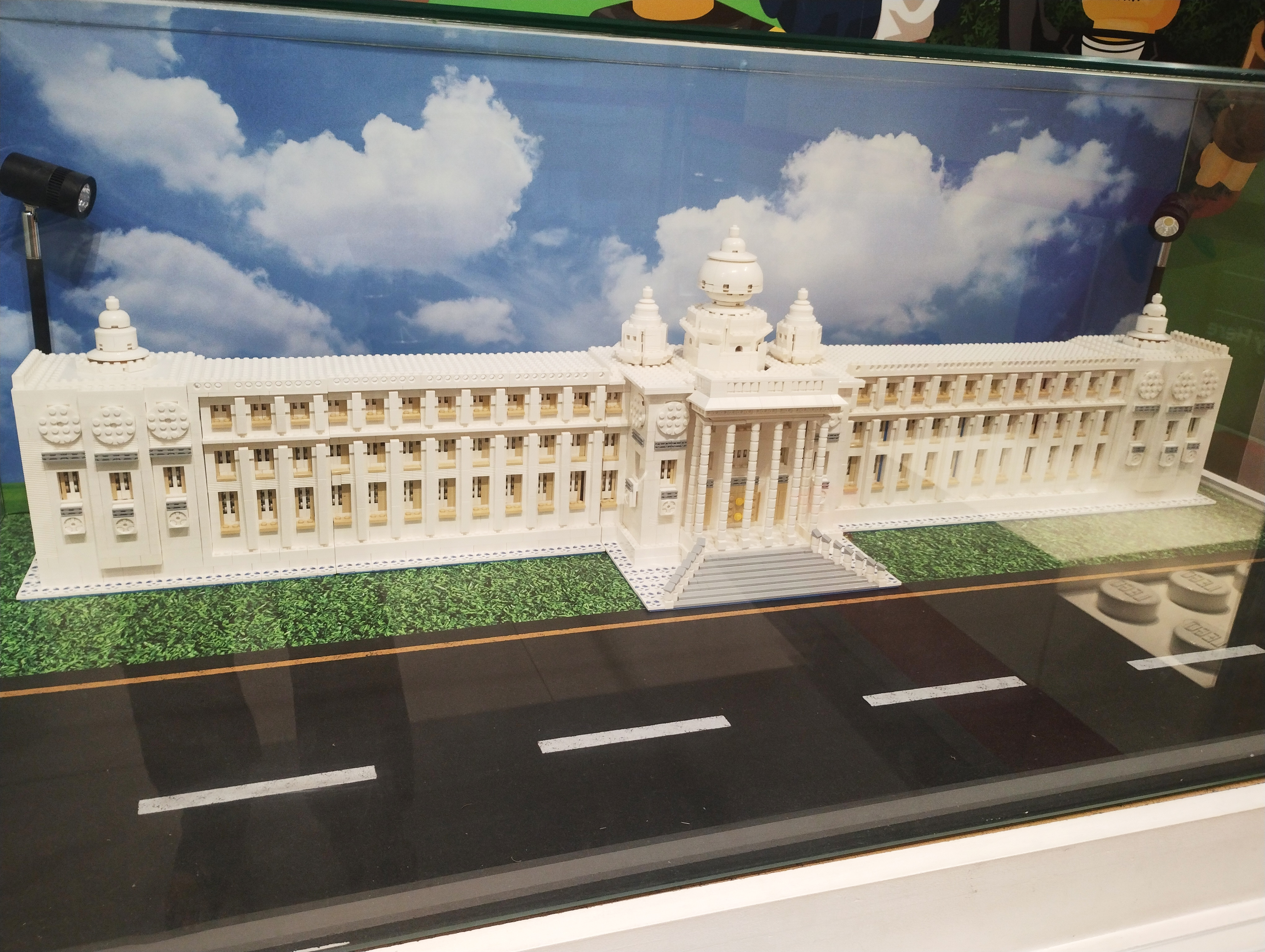
Vidhana Soudha Lego artifact in Orion Mall, Rajajinagar

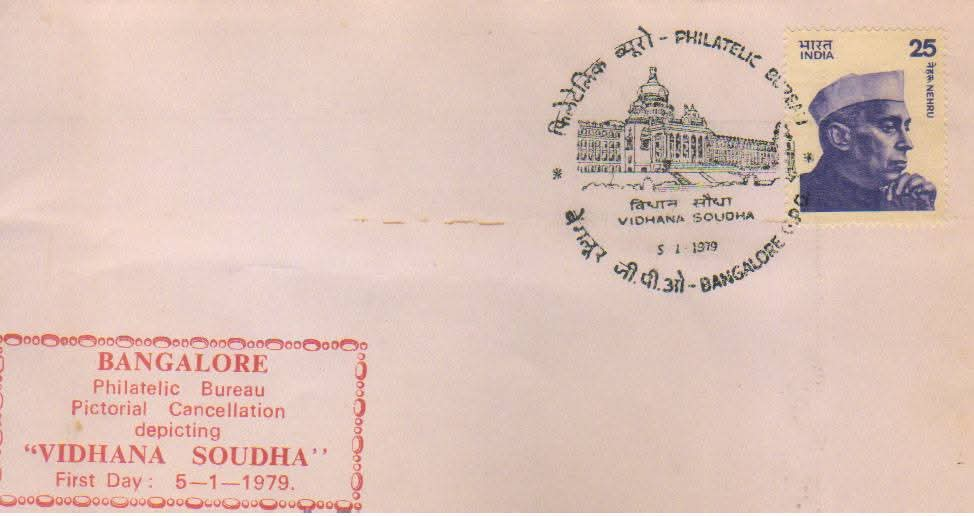
First Day Pictorial Cancellation of Vidhana Soudha, Bangalore.
