= All India Progressive Janata Dal =

Defunct political party in India

- Abbreviation: AIPJD
- Founded: 11 December 2002
- Dissolved: 2006
- Split from: Janata Dal (United); Janata Dal (Secular)
- Merged into: Indian National Congress
- ECI Status: dissolved party

All India Progressive Janata Dal (formerly All India Janata Dal), was a political party in India. AIJD was launched on December 11, 2002, by several leaders of Janata Dal (Secular) and Janata Dal (United) in Karnataka, including the main JD(U) leader in the state Ramakrishna Hegde and JD(S) leader S. R. Bommai.

AIJD president was former Union minister S. R. Bommai (coming from JD(S)) and vice-president was Rajya Sabha member Vijay Mallya (previously vice-president of JD(U)). General Secretary was Basavaraj Rayareddy.

C. M. Ibrahim was also the National President for a brief period

On March 14, 2003, the Janata Party of Subramanian Swamy merged with AIJD. Swamy was appointed chairman of the political affairs committee of the party.

Mallya and Swamy later left AIPJD to reconstitute the Janata Party.

On May 19, 2003, AIJD was renamed All India Progressive Janata Dal. AIPJD was later disintegrated, with two Lok Sabha MPs and 11 members of the Karnataka assembly joining the Indian National Congress ahead of the 2004 Lok Sabha elections. The remaining AIPJD merged with Janata Dal (United).

The AIPJD was briefly revived in 2005 by Siddaramaiah, following his expulsion from the JD(S). The AIPJD subsequently merged with Congress in 2006.
