= H. C. Dasappa =

Indian politician

Hirallli Chenniah Dasappa
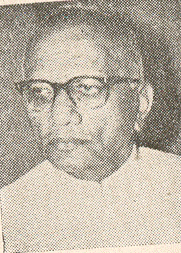

Minister of Railways
- In office 21 September 1963 – 8 June 1964
- Preceded by: Swaran Singh
- Succeeded by: S. K. Patil

Member of Parliament, Lok Sabha
- In office 1957-1967
- Preceded by: T. Madiah Gowda
- Succeeded by: K. Hanumanthaiya
- Constituency: Bangalore

Minister of Finance of Mysore
- In office 25 October 1947 – 30 March 1952

Personal details
- Born: 5 December 1894 Coorg, British India (now Karnataka, India)
- Died: 29 October 1964 (aged 69)
- Party: Indian National Congress
- Spouse: Yashodhara Dasappa
- Children: 2 sons and 1 daughter

Hirallli Chenniah Dasappa (5 December 1894 – 29 October 1964) was an Indian politician. He was elected to the Lok Sabha, the Lower House of the Parliament from Bangalore in Mysore State in 1957 and 1962 as a member of the Indian National Congress.

He served as the Railway Minister of India under Jawaharlal Nehru in 1963-64.
