= Kengal Hanumanthaiah =

Second Chief Minister of Karnataka

2nd Chief Minister of Mysore State
- In office 30 March 1952 – 19 August 1956
- Preceded by: K. C. Reddy
- Succeeded by: Kadidal Manjappa

Member of the Indian Parliament for Bangalore
- In office 17 March 1967 – 18 January 1977
- Preceded by: H. C. Dasappa
- Succeeded by: Constituency Abolished

Member of the Indian Parliament for Bangalore City
- In office 2 April 1962 – 16 March 1967
- Preceded by: N. Keshavaiengar
- Succeeded by: Constituency Abolished

Member of Constituent Assembly of India
- In office 9 December 1946 – 24 January 1950

Personal details
- Born: 14 February 1908 Lakkappanahalli, Kingdom of Mysore, British India (present-day Karnataka, India)
- Died: 1 December 1980 (aged 72)
- Party: Surajya Party (From Sep 1977)
- Other political affiliations: Indian National Congress (Till Sep 1977)

Kengal Hanumanthaiah (10 February 1908 – 1 December 1980), also spelt as Kengal Hanumanthaiya, was the second Chief Minister of Karnataka (then, Mysore State) from 30 March 1952 to 19 August 1956. He contributed to the construction of Vidhana Soudha, the seat of the state legislature.

== Early life ==
Hanumanthaiah was born on 10 February 1908, in a Vokkaliga family in a Lakkappanahalli, a small village near Ramanagara, Bengaluru south District. He graduated in Arts from the Maharaja College in Mysore in 1930 and later earned a degree in Law from Poona Law College in 1932. During his college days, he was elected as the Secretary of the Students Union and the Karnataka Sangha. After his graduation, he joined the bar council in the same year.

== Political career ==
At that time, the independence movement was steadily growing and at the center stage of the movement was the Indian National Congress led by Mahatma Gandhi. Dr. P. Tandon, the then President of Indian National Congress, advised Hanumanthaiah to give up his active practice at the bar and to devote himself to the freedom struggle. With the inspiration of Gandhiji and the persuasion of Tandon, Hanumanthaiah joined the freedom movement and became active in the then Mysore Congress. During the movement, he was jailed more than 7 times. He was unanimously elected as the leader of the Parliamentary Party wing of the Congress Party in Mysore Assembly in the year 1948. Also, he was a member of the Constituent Assembly of India.

He became the second Chief minister of Mysore state in 1952, following the victory of the Congress party in the 1st general elections. His tenure as Chief Minister was marked by activities aimed at uplifting the rural population of the state and promoting economic growth. Hanumanthaiah's major achievement was the construction of the "Vidhana Soudha", the largest legislature-cum-office building in India at that time. His other key achievement was the Unification of Karnataka. He played a role in uniting the Kannada speaking areas within the boundaries of a single state.

== Role in Constituent Assembly ==
He was part of the Committee for the Drafting of a Model Constitution for the Indian States and made interventions on the issue of federalism. In the Constituent Assembly, he argued for greater autonomy for states.

== Vidhana Soudha ==
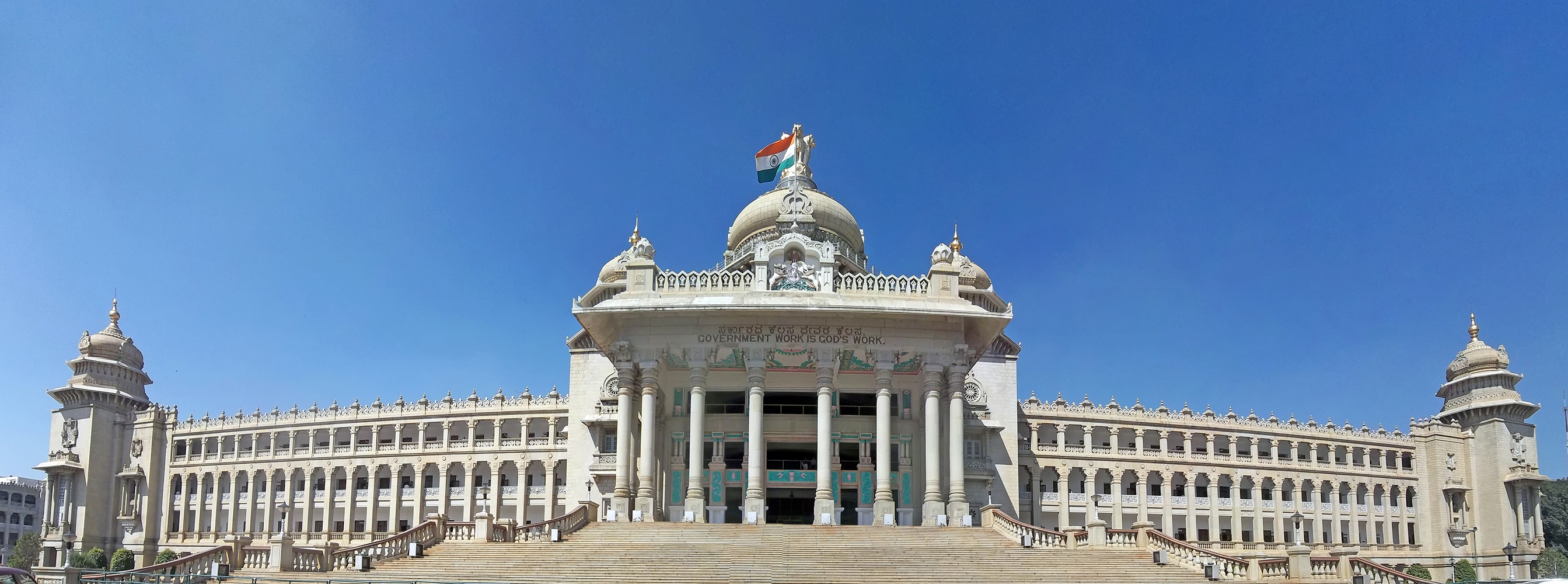
Hanumanthaiah played a key role in the construction of the Vidhan Soudha, the seat of Karnataka's legislature.

During an interview, Kengal Hanumanthaiah explained the reasoning behind the construction of a grand legislature building. A Russian cultural delegation was visiting Bangalore and Hanumanthaiah took them around to show the city. Stung by their comments, Hanumanthaiah vowed to create a monument so magnificent that it would showcase the best of Karnataka's indigenous architectural style. This resulted in the Vidhana Soudha, the seat of Legislature in Karnataka.

== Later life ==
After resigning as Chief Minister shortly before the Unification of Karnataka in 1956, he moved on to national politics. He was continuously elected as a member of parliament representing Bangalore city from 1962 to 1967 and represented Bangalore from 1967 to 1977. He was member of the 3rd (1962), 4th (1967) and 5th (1971) Loksabha. During this period he served as minister in the Union cabinet handling a number of portfolios such as Railways, Industries etc. In the 1971 elections, he defeated the poet Gopalkrishna Adiga, who was a candidate of the Jana Sangh. However, he lost to Justice K. S. Hegde of the Janata party in 1977. He died on 1 December 1980.

== Legacy ==
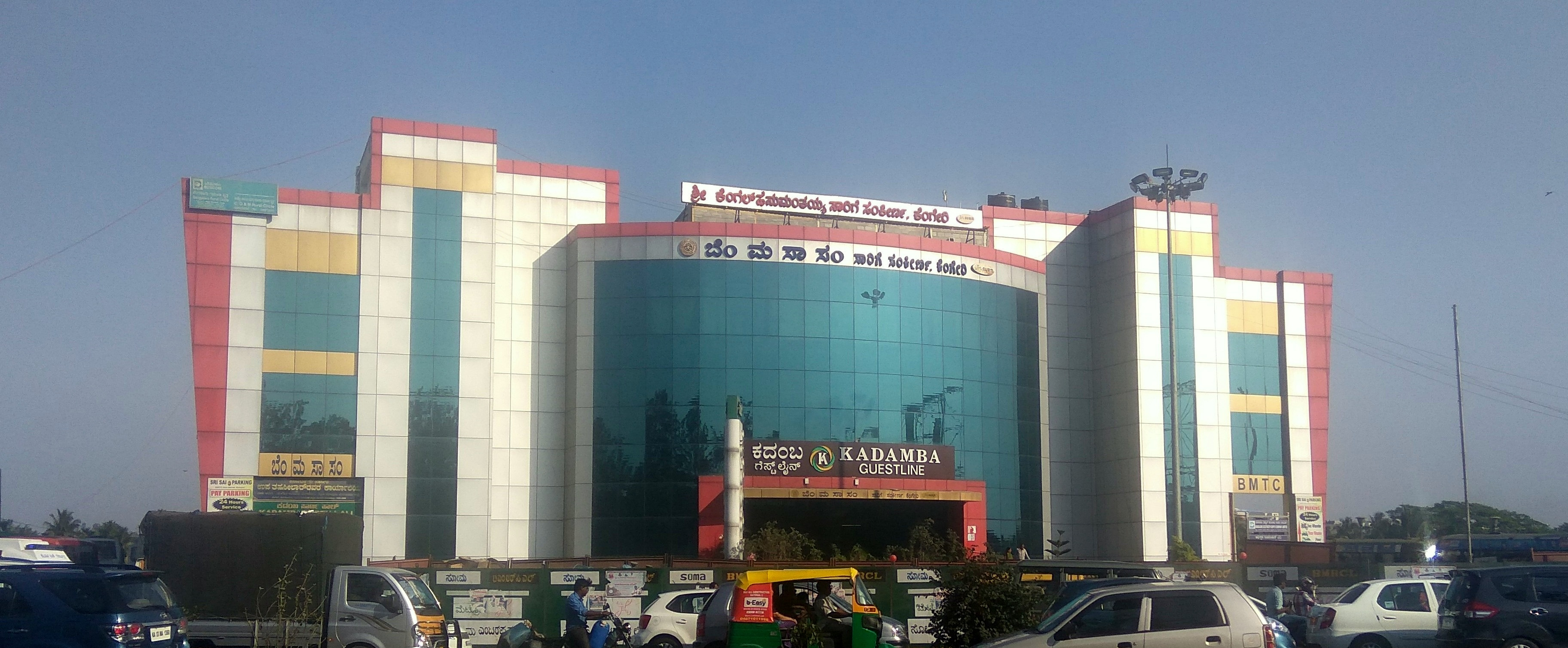
Kengeri TTMC junction is named after Hanumanthaiah

The Kengal Hanumanthaiya Memorial Trust celebrated his 104th birthday in 2012 which had the Chief Guest, the 13th President (then Finance Minister), Pranab Mukherjee.

A major road in Bangalore called Double Road near Lalbagh is renamed as Kengal Hanumanthiah Road. A statue of Hanumanthaiah has been installed in front of the Vidhana Soudha. His centenary celebrations were held in the year 2008.

The Kengeri TTMC junction in Bangalore is named as "Shri Kengal Hanumanthaiah Transport Junction."

== See also ==
- List of chief ministers of Karnataka

Political offices
Preceded by K. C. Reddy	Chief Minister of Mysore State; 1952–1956	Succeeded by Kadidal Manjappa
