= List of Lok Sabha members from Karnataka =

This is the List of members of the Lok Sabha, representing from Karnataka. These lower house members of the Indian Parliament were elected in the Indian general election. The state of Karnataka is represented in the Lok Sabha, the lower house of the Parliament of India, by 28 Members of Parliament (MPs). They are elected from territorial constituencies across the state. Members of the Lok Sabha serve a five year term, unless the house is dissolved earlier.

== 1st Lok Sabha ==
Key
INC (10)
KMPP (1)

No.	Constituency	Member of Parliament	Party affiliation
1	Kolar	M. V. Krishnappa	Indian National Congress
2	Kolar	Dodda Thimmaiah	Indian National Congress
3	Tumkur	C. R. Basappa	Indian National Congress
4	Bangalore North	N. Keshaveingar	Indian National Congress
5	Bangalore South	T. Madiah Gowda	Indian National Congress
6	Mandya	M. K. Shivananjappa	Indian National Congress
7	Hassan Chikmagalur	H. Siddananjappa	Indian National Congress
8	Shimoga	K. G. Wodeyar	Indian National Congress
9	Chitradurga	S. Nijalingappa	Indian National Congress
10	Mysore	N. Rachiah	Indian National Congress
11	Mysore	M. S. Gurupadaswamy	Kisan Mazdoor Praja Party

== 2nd Lok Sabha ==
Key
INC (23) PSP (1) SCF (1) IND (1)

No.	Constituency	Member	Party
1	Bangalore	H. C. Dasappa	Indian National Congress
2	Bangalore City	N. Keshaveingar	Indian National Congress
3	Belgaum	Balwantrao Nageshrao Datar	Indian National Congress
4	Bellary	Tekur Subramanyam	Indian National Congress
5	Bijapur North	Murigappa Siddappa Sugandhi	Independent
6	Bijapur South	Ramappa Balappa Bidari	Indian National Congress
7	Chikodi (SC)	Datta Appa Katti	Scheduled Castes Federation
8	Chitradurga	J. Mohamed Imam	Praja Socialist Party
9	Dharwad North	Dattatraya Parasuram Karmarkar	Indian National Congress
10	Dharwad South	Thimmappa Rudrappa Nesvi	Indian National Congress
11	Gulbarga	Mahadevappa Rampure	Indian National Congress
12	Gulbarga (SC)	Shankar Deo	Indian National Congress
13	Hassan	H. Siddananjappa	Indian National Congress
14	Kanara	Joachim Alva	Indian National Congress
15	Kolar	K. Chengalaraya Reddy	Indian National Congress
16	Kolar (SC)	Dodda Thimmaiah	Indian National Congress
17	Koppal	Sangappa A. Agadi	Indian National Congress
18	Mandya	M.K. Shivananjappa	Indian National Congress
19	Mangalore	K. R. Achar	Indian National Congress
20	Mysore	M. Shankaraiya	Indian National Congress
21	Mysore (SC)	S. M. Siddiah	Indian National Congress
22	Raichur	G. S. Melkote	Indian National Congress
23	Shimoga	K. G. Wodeyar	Indian National Congress
24	Tiptur	C. R. Basappa	Indian National Congress
25	Tumkur	M. V. Krishnappa	Indian National Congress
26	Udupi	U. Srinivas Mallya	Indian National Congress

== 3rd Lok Sabha ==
Karnataka was known as Mysore state till November 1, 1973.

INC (25) LSS (1)

No.	Constituency	Member	Party
1	Bangalore	H. C. Dasappa	Indian National Congress
1	Bangalore	H. K. V. Gowda	Indian National Congress
2	Bangalore City	K. Hanumanthaiya	Indian National Congress
3	Belgaum	Balwantrao Nageshrao Datar	Indian National Congress
3	Belgaum	H. V. Koujalgi (1963 bypoll)	Indian National Congress
4	Bellary	Tekur Subramanyam	Indian National Congress
5	Bidar (SC)	Ramchandra Veerappa	Indian National Congress
6	Bijapur North	Rajaram Girdharilal Dubey	Indian National Congress
7	Bijapur South	Sanganagouda Basanagouda Patil	Indian National Congress
8	Chamarajanagar (SC)	S. M. Siddaiah	Indian National Congress
9	Chikballapur	K. Chengalaraya Reddy	Indian National Congress
9	Chikballapur	H. C. L. Reddy	Indian National Congress
10	Chikodi	Vasantrao Lakhagounda Patil	Indian National Congress
11	Chitradurga	K. S. Veerabasappa	Indian National Congress
12	Dharwad North	Sarojini Mahishi	Indian National Congress
13	Dharwad South	Fakruddin Husseinsad Mohsin	Indian National Congress
14	Gulbarga	Mahadevappa Rampure	Indian National Congress
15	Hassan	H. Siddananjappa	Indian National Congress
16	Kanara	Joachim Alva	Indian National Congress
17	Kolar (SC)	Dodda Thimmaiah	Indian National Congress
18	Koppal	Sivamurthi Swami	Lok Sewak Sangh
19	Mandya	M. K. Shivananjappa	Indian National Congress
20	Mangalore	A. Shanker Alva	Indian National Congress
21	Mysore	M. Shankaraiya	Indian National Congress
22	Raichur	Jagannath Rao Chandriki	Indian National Congress
23	Shimoga	S. V. Krishnamoorthy Rao	Indian National Congress
24	Tiptur	C. R. Basappa	Indian National Congress
25	Tumkur	M. V. Krishnappa	Indian National Congress
25	Tumkur	Ajit Prasad Jain	Indian National Congress
25	Tumkur	Mali Mariyappa	Indian National Congress
26	Udupi	U. Srinivas Mallya	Indian National Congress

== 4th Lok Sabha ==
Constituency	Member	Party
Bagalkot	Sanganagouda Basanagouda Patil	Indian National Congress
Bidar (SC)	Ramchandra Veerappa	Congress
Bijapur	Basagondappa Kadappa Gudadinni	Indian National Congress (I)
Chikballapur	M. V. Krishnappa	Indian National Congress
Chikkodi (SC)	B. Shankaranand	Indian National Congress (I)
Dharwad North	Dr. Sarojini Bindurao Mahishi	Indian National Congress
Dharwad South	Fahkruddin Husseinsad Mohsin	Indian National Congress (I)
Kolar (SC)	G.Y. Krishnan	Indian National Congress (I)
Mandya	S. M. Krishna	Indian National Congress (I)
Mysore	M. Tulsidas Dasappa	Indian National Congress
Tumkur	K. Lakkappa	Indian National Congress (I)

== 5th Lok Sabha ==
Constituency	Member	Party
Bagalkot	Sanganagouda Basanagouda Patil	Indian National Congress
Kanakapura	C. K. Jaffer Sharief	Indian National Congress
Belgaum	Appaya Kravirappa Kotrashetti	Indian National Congress
Bidar (SC)	Shankar Dev	Indian National Congress
Chikballapur	M. V. Krishnappa	Indian National Congress
Chikkodi (SC)	B. Shankaranand	Indian National Congress (I)
Chitradurga	K. Mallanna	Indian National Congress (I)
Davangere	Kondajji Basappa	Indian National Congress
Dharwad North	Dr. Sarojini Bindurao Mahishi	Indian National Congress
Dharwad South	Fakruddin Husseinsad Mohsin	Indian National Congress (I)
Gulbarga	C. M. Stephen	Indian National Congress (I)
Gulbarga	Sidram Reddy	Indian National Congress
Kolar (SC)	G. Y. Krishnan	Indian National Congress (I)
Koppal	Swami Siddarameshwar Bassayya	Indian National Congress
Mandya	Keragode Chikkalingaiah	Indian National Congress
Mandya	S. M. Krishna	Indian National Congress (I)
Mysore	M. Tulsidas Dasappa	Indian National Congress
Shimoga	T. V. Chandrashekarappa	Indian National Congress (I)
Tumkur	K. Lakkappa	Indian National Congress (I)

== 6th Lok Sabha ==
INC (26) JP (2)

No.	Constituency	Member of Parliament	Party affiliation	Roles and responsibilities
1	Bidar (SC)	Shankar Dev Balaji Rao	Indian National Congress	
2	Gulbarga	Sidram Reddi	Indian National Congress	
3	Raichur	Rajshekhar Mallappa	Indian National Congress	
4	Koppal	Sidrameshwara Swamy Basayya	Indian National Congress	
5	Bellary	K. S. Veerabhadrappa	Indian National Congress	
6	Davangere	Kondajji Basappa	Indian National Congress	
7	Chitradurga	K. Mallanna	Indian National Congress	
8	Tumkur	K. Lakkappa	Indian National Congress	
9	Chikballapur	M. V. Krishnappa	Indian National Congress	Minister of State in the Ministry of Agriculture and Irrigation (October 25, 1979 – January 14, 1980)
10	Kolar (SC)	G. Y. Krishnan	Indian National Congress	
11	Kanakapura	M. V. Chandrashekara Murthy	Indian National Congress	
12	Bangalore North	C. K. Jaffar Shariff	Indian National Congress	
13	Bangalore South	K. S. Hegde	Janata Party	Speaker of Lok Sabha (21 July 1977 – 21 January 1980)
14	Mandya	K. Chickalingaiah	Indian National Congress	
15	Chamarajanagar (SC)	B. Rachaiah	Indian National Congress	Minister of State in the Ministry of Industry (August 4, 1979 – January 14, 1980)
16	Mysore	H. D. Tulsidas	Indian National Congress	
17	Mangalore	Janardhana Poojary	Indian National Congress	
18	Udupi	T. A. Pai	Indian National Congress	Minister of Railways (July 30, 1979 – January 14, 1980).; Minister of Industry (November 27, 1979 – January 14, 1980).
19	Hassan	S. Nanjesha Gowda	Janata Party	
20	Chikmagalur	D. B. Chandre Gowda	Indian National Congress	
21	Shimoga	A. R. Badarinarayan	Indian National Congress	
22	Kanara	Kadam Balsu Pursu	Indian National Congress	
23	Dharwad South	Mohsin F. H.	Indian National Congress	
24	Dharwad North	Mahishi Sarojini Bindurao	Indian National Congress	
25	Belgaum	Kotrashetti Appayappa Karaveerappa	Indian National Congress	
26	Chikkodi (SC)	B. Shankaranand	Indian National Congress	
27	Bagalkot	Patil Sanganagouda Basangouda	Indian National Congress	
28	Bijapur	Choudhari Kalingappa Bhimanna	Indian National Congress	

== 7th Lok Sabha ==
INC(I) (27) JP (1)

No.	Constituency	Member of Parliament	Party affiliation	Roles and responsibilities
1	Bidar (SC)	Narsingrao Suryawanshi	Indian National Congress (Indira)	
2	Gulbarga	Dharam Singh	Indian National Congress (Indira)	
3	Raichur	B. V. Desai	Indian National Congress (Indira)	
4	Koppal	H. G. Ramulu	Indian National Congress (Indira)	
5	Bellary	R. Y. Ghorpade	Indian National Congress (Indira)	
6	Davangere	T. V. Chandrashekarappa	Indian National Congress (Indira)	
7	Chitradurga	K. Mallanna	Indian National Congress (Indira)	
8	Tumkur	K. Lakkappa	Indian National Congress (Indira)	
9	Chikballapur	S. N. Prasan Kumar	Indian National Congress (Indira)	
10	Kolar (SC)	G. Y. Krishnan	Indian National Congress (Indira)	
11	Kanakapura	M. V. Chandrashekara Murthy	Indian National Congress (Indira)	
12	Bangalore North	C. K. Jaffer Sharief	Indian National Congress (Indira)	MoS in the Ministry of Railways (Jan 1980–Oct 1984); MoS(I/C) of Irrigation (Noc 1984–Dec 1984)
13	Bangalore South	T. R. Shamanna	Janata Party	
14	Mandya	S. M. Krishna	Indian National Congress (Indira)	MoS in the Min. of Industry (Jan 1983–Feb 1984).; MoS in the Min. of Finance (Feb 1984–Sept 1984).; MoS in the Min. of Commerce (Sept 1984–Oct 1984); MoS in the Min. of Commerce (Nov 1984–Dec 1984)
15	Chamarajanagar (SC)	Srinivasa Prasad	Indian National Congress (Indira)	
16	Mysore	M. Rajasekara Murthy	Indian National Congress (Indira)	
17	Mangalore	Janardhana Poojary	Indian National Congress (Indira)	Dy. Min. in the Ministry of Finance (Banking and Insurance) (Jan 1982–Oct 1984) & (Oct 1984–Dec 1984)
18	Udupi	Oscar Fernandes	Indian National Congress (Indira)	
19	Hassan	H. N. Nanje Gowda	Indian National Congress (Indira)	
20	Chikmagalur	D. M. Puttegowda	Indian National Congress (Indira)	
21	Shimoga	S. T. Quadri	Indian National Congress (Indira)	
22	Kanara	G. Devaraya Naik	Indian National Congress (Indira)	
23	Dharwad South	Fakruddinsab Hussensab Mohsin	Indian National Congress (Indira)	
24	Dharwad North	D. K. Naikar	Indian National Congress (Indira)	
25	Belgaum	Sidnal Shanmukhappa Basappa	Indian National Congress (Indira)	
26	Chikkodi (SC)	B. Shankaranand	Indian National Congress (Indira)	Dy. Min in the Dept of Social Welfare (Jan 1980–Oct 1980).; Min. of Education & Culture (Jan 1980–Oct 1980).; Min. of Health & Family Welfare (Jan 1980–Oct 1980) & (Nov 1984–Dec 1984)
27	Bagalkot	Veerendra Patil	Indian National Congress (Indira)	Min. of Petroleum & Chemicals (March 1980–Oct 1980).; Min. of Shipping & Transport (Oct 1980–Sept 1982) & (Sept 1984–Oct 1984); Min. of Labour & Rehabilitation (Sept 1982–Oct 1984) & (Nov 1984–Dec 1984
28	Bijapur	Choudhari Kalingappa Bhimanna	Indian National Congress (Indira)	

== 8th Lok Sabha ==
INC (24) JP (4)

No.	Constituency	Member of Parliament	Party affiliation
1	Bagalkot	Hanumatgouda Bhimanagouda Patil	Indian National Congress
2	Bangalore North	C. K. Jaffer Sharief	Indian National Congress
3	Bangalore South	V. S. Krishna Iyer	Janata Party
4	Belgaum	Sidnal Shanmukhappa Basappa	Indian National Congress
5	Bellary	Basavarajeshwari	Indian National Congress
6	Bidar (SC)	Narsing Hulla Suryawanshi	Indian National Congress
7	Bijapur	S. M. Guraddi	Janata Party
8	Chamrajanagar (SC)	V. Sreenivasa Prasad	Indian National Congress
9	Chikballapur	V. Krishna Rao	Indian National Congress
10	Chikkodi (SC)	B. Shankaranand	Indian National Congress
11	Chikmagalur	D. K. Taradevi	Indian National Congress
12	Chitradurga	K. H. Ranganath	Indian National Congress
13	Davangere	Channaiah Odeyar	Indian National Congress
14	Dharwad North	D. K. Naikar	Indian National Congress
15	Dharwad South	Azeez Sait	Indian National Congress
16	Gulbarga	Veerendra Patil	Indian National Congress
17	Hassan	H. N. Nanje Gowda	Indian National Congress
18	Kanakapura	M. V. Chandrashekara Murthy	Indian National Congress
19	Kanara	G. Devaraya Naik	Indian National Congress
20	Kolar (SC)	Dr. V. Venkatesh	Janata Party
21	Koppal	H. G. Ramulu	Indian National Congress
22	Mandya	K. V. Shankaragowda	Janata Party
23	Mangalore	Janardhana Poojary	Indian National Congress
24	Mysore	Srikantadatta Narasimharaja Wadiyar	Indian National Congress
25	Raichur	B. V. Desai	Indian National Congress
25	Raichur	M. Y. Ghorpade (1986 Bypoll)	Indian National Congress
26	Shimoga	T. V. Chandrashekarappa	Indian National Congress
27	Tumkur	Gangasandra Siddappa Basavaraj	Indian National Congress
28	Udipi	Oscar Fernandes	Indian National Congress

== 9th Lok Sabha ==
INC (27) JD (1)

No.	Constituency	Member of Parliament	Party affiliation	Roles and responsibilities
1	Bidar (SC)	Narsingrao Suryawanshi	Indian National Congress	
2	Gulbarga	Basawaraj Jawali	Indian National Congress	
3	Raichur	R. Ambanna Naik Dore	Indian National Congress	
4	Koppal	Basavaraj Patil Anwari	Janata Dal	Minister of State in the Ministry of Steel and Mines (21 November 1990 – 21 June 1991)
5	Bellary	Basavarajeshwari	Indian National Congress	
6	Davangere	Channaiah Odeyar	Indian National Congress	
7	Chitradurga	C. P. Mudalagiriyappa	Indian National Congress	
8	Tumkur	G. S. Basavaraj	Indian National Congress	
9	Chikballapur	V. Krishna Rao	Indian National Congress	
10	Kolar (SC)	Y. Ramakrishna	Indian National Congress	
11	Kanakapura	M. V. Chandrashekara Murthy	Indian National Congress	
12	Bangalore North	C. K. Jaffer Sharief	Indian National Congress	
13	Bangalore South	R. Gundu Rao	Indian National Congress	
14	Mandya	G. Made Gowda	Indian National Congress	
15	Chamarajanagar (SC)	Srinivasa Prasad	Indian National Congress	
16	Mysore	Srikantadatta Narasimharaja Wadiyar	Indian National Congress	
17	Mangalore	Janardhana Poojary	Indian National Congress	
18	Udupi	Oscar Fernandes	Indian National Congress	
19	Hassan	H. C. Srikantaiah	Indian National Congress	
20	Chikmagalur	D. M. Putte Gowda	Indian National Congress	
21	Shimoga	T. V. Chandrashekarappa	Indian National Congress	
22	Kanara	G. Devaraya Naik	Indian National Congress	
23	Dharwad South	Mujahid B. M.	Indian National Congress	
24	Dharwad North	D. K. Naikar	Indian National Congress	
25	Belgaum	Sidnal Shanmukhappa Basappa	Indian National Congress	
26	Chikkodi (SC)	B. Shankaranand	Indian National Congress	
27	Bagalkot	Patil Subhash Tamannaappa	Indian National Congress	
28	Bijapur	Gudadinni Basagondappa Kadappa	Indian National Congress	

== 10th Lok Sabha ==
No.	Constituency	Type	Name of Elected M.P.	Party affiliation
1	Bidar	SC	Ramchandra Veerappa	Bharatiya Janata Party
2	Gulbarga	GEN	Basawaraj Jawali	Indian National Congress
3	Raichur	GEN	Venkatesh Naik	Indian National Congress
4	Koppal	GEN	Basavaraj Patil Anwari	Indian National Congress
5	Bellary	GEN	Basavarajeshwari	Indian National Congress
6	Davangere	GEN	Channaiah Odeyar	Indian National Congress
7	Chitradurga	GEN	C. P. Mudalagiriyappa	Indian National Congress
8	Tumkur	GEN	S. Mallikarjunaiah	Bharatiya Janata Party
9	Chikballapur	GEN	V. Krishna Rao	Indian National Congress
10	Kolar	SC	K.H. Muniyappa	Indian National Congress
11	Kanakapura	GEN	M. V. Chandrashekara Murthy	Indian National Congress
12	Bangalore North	GEN	C. K. Jaffer Sharief	Indian National Congress
13	Bangalore South	GEN	K. Venkatagiri Gowda	Bharatiya Janata Party
14	Mandya	GEN	G. Made Gowda	Indian National Congress
15	Chamarajanagar	SC	Srinivasa Prasad	Indian National Congress
16	Mysore	GEN	Chandraprabha Urs	Indian National Congress
17	Mangalore	GEN	Dhananjay Kumar	Bharatiya Janata Party
18	Udupi	GEN	Oscar Fernandes	Indian National Congress
19	Hassan	GEN	H. D. Deve Gowda	Janata Dal
20	Chikmagalur	GEN	Taradevi Siddhartha	Indian National Congress
21	Shimoga	GEN	K. G. Shivappa	Indian National Congress
22	Kanara	GEN	G. Devaraya Naik	Indian National Congress
23	Dharwad South	GEN	B. M. Mujahid	Indian National Congress
24	Dharwad North	GEN	D. K. Naikar	Indian National Congress
25	Belgaum	GEN	Sidnal Shanmukhappa Basappa	Indian National Congress
26	Chikkodi	SC	B. Shankaranand	Indian National Congress
27	Bagalkot	GEN	Siddu Nyamagouda	Indian National Congress
28	Bijapur	GEN	Basagondappa Gudadinni	Indian National Congress

== 11th Lok Sabha ==
JD (16) BJP (6) INC (5) KCP (1)

Constituency		Member	Party
#	Name	Member	Party
1	Bidar (SC)	Ramchandra Veerappa	BJP
2	Gulbarga	Qamar ul Islam	JD
3	Raichur	Raja Rangappa Naik	JD
4	Koppal	Basavaraj Rayareddy	JD
5	Bellary	K. C. Kondaiah	INC
6	Davanagere	Gowdara Mallikarjunappa Siddeshwara	BJP
7	Chitradurga	P. Kondandaramaiah	JD
8	Tumkur	C. N. Bhaskarappa	JD
9	Chikballapur	R. L. Jalappa	JD
10	Kolar (SC)	K. H. Muniyappa	INC
11	Kanakapura	H. D. Kumaraswamy	JD
12	Bangalore North	C. Narayanaswamy	JD
13	Bangalore South	Ananth Kumar	BJP
14	Mandya	Krishna	JD
15	Chamarajanagar (SC)	A. Siddaraju	JD
16	Mysore	Srikantadatta Wadiyar	INC
17	Mangalore	V. Dhananjay Kumar	BJP
18	Udupi	Oscar Fernandes	INC
19	Hassan	Rudresh Gowda	JD
20	Chikmagalur	B. L. Shankar	JD
21	Shimoga	S. Bangarappa	KCP
22	Canara	Anantkumar Hegde	BJP
23	Dharwad South	I. G. Sanadi	INC
24	Dharwad North	Vijay Sankeshwar	BJP
25	Belgaum	Mahantesh Koujalagi	JD
26	Chikkodi (SC)	Ratnamala Savanur	JD
27	Bagalkot	H. Y. Meti	JD
28	Bijapur	Basanagouda Rudragouda Patil	JD

== 12th Lok Sabha ==
No.	Constituency	Type	Name of Elected M.P.	Party affiliation
1	Bidar	SC	Ramchandra Veerappa	Bharatiya Janata Party
2	Gulbarga	GEN	Basavaraj Patil Sedam	Bharatiya Janata Party
3	Raichur	GEN	A. Venkatesh Naik	Indian National Congress
4	Koppal	GEN	H.G.Ramulu	Indian National Congress
5	Bellary	GEN	K.C. Kondaiah	Indian National Congress
6	Davangere	GEN	Shamanuru Shivashankarappa	Indian National Congress
7	Chitradurga	GEN	C. P. Mudala Giriyappa	Indian National Congress
8	Tumkur	GEN	S. Mallikarjunaiah	Bharatiya Janata Party
9	Chikballapur	GEN	R.L. Jalappa	Indian National Congress
10	Kolar	SC	K.H. Muniyappa	Indian National Congress
11	Kanakapura	GEN	M. Srinivas	Bharatiya Janata Party
12	Bangalore North	GEN	C.K. Jaffar Sharief	Indian National Congress
13	Bangalore South	GEN	Ananth Kumar	Bharatiya Janata Party
14	Mandya	GEN	Ambareesh	Janata Dal
15	Chamarajanagar	SC	Siddaraju A.	Janata Dal
16	Mysore	GEN	C.H. Vijayashankar	Bharatiya Janata Party
17	Mangalore	GEN	Dhananjay Kumar	Bharatiya Janata Party
18	Udupi	GEN	I. M. Jayarama Shetty	Bharatiya Janata Party
19	Hassan	GEN	H.D. Devegowda	Janata Dal
20	Chikmagalur	GEN	D. C. Srikantappa	Bharatiya Janata Party
21	Shimoga	GEN	Aayanooru Manjunatha	Bharatiya Janata Party
22	Kanara	GEN	Ananth Kumar Hegde	Bharatiya Janata Party
23	Dharwad South	GEN	B M Menasinakai	Lok Shakti
24	Dharwad North	GEN	Vijay Sankeshwar	Bharatiya Janata Party
25	Belgaum	GEN	Babagouda Rudragouda Patil	Bharatiya Janata Party
26	Chikkodi	SC	Jigajinagi Ramesh Chandappa	Lok Shakti
27	Bagalkot	GEN	Ajaykumar Sambasadashiv Sarnaik	Lok Shakti
28	Bijapur	GEN	Patil Mallanagouda Basanagouda	Indian National Congress

== 13th Lok Sabha ==
Keys: INC (18) BJP (7) JD(U) (3)

No.	Constituency	Name of elected M.P.	Party affiliation
1	Bidar (SC)	Ramchandra Veerappa	Bharatiya Janata Party
2	Gulbarga	Iqbal Ahmed Saradgi	Indian National Congress
3	Raichur	A. Venkatesh Naik	Indian National Congress
4	Koppal	H G Ramulu	Indian National Congress
5	Bellary	Sonia Gandhi	Indian National Congress
6	Davangere	G. Mallikarjunappa	Bharatiya Janata Party
7	Chitradurga	Shashi Kumar	Janata Dal
8	Tumkur	G. S. Basavaraj	Indian National Congress
9	Chikballapur	R.L. Jalappa	Indian National Congress
10	Kolar (SC)	K.H. Muniyappa	Indian National Congress
11	Kanakapura	M. V. Chandrashekara Murthy	Indian National Congress
12	Bangalore North	C K Jaffar Sharief	Indian National Congress
13	Bangalore South	Ananth Kumar	Bharatiya Janata Party
14	Mandya	Ambareesh M. H.	Indian National Congress
15	Chamarajnagar (SC)	V. Srinivasa Prasad	Janata Dal
16	Mysore	Srikantadatta Narasimharaja Wadiyar	Indian National Congress
17	Mangalore	V. Dhananjaya Kumar	Bharatiya Janata Party
18	Udupi	Vinay Kumar Sorake	Indian National Congress
19	Hassan	G. Putta Swamy Gowda	Indian National Congress
20	Chikmagalur	D. C. Srikantappa	Bharatiya Janata Party
21	Shimoga	S. Bangarappa	Indian National Congress
22	Kanara	Margaret Alva	Indian National Congress
23	Dharwad South	Prof. I.G. Sanadi	Indian National Congress
24	Dharwad North	Vijay Sankeshwar	Bharatiya Janata Party
25	Belgaum	Amarsinh Vasantarao Patil	Indian National Congress
26	Chikkodi (SC)	Jigajinagi Ramesh Chandappa	Janata Dal
27	Bagalkot	R S Patil	Indian National Congress
28	Bijapur	Basanagouda R Patil (Yatnal)	Bharatiya Janata Party

== 14th Lok Sabha ==
Keys:

- BJP (16)
- INC (9)
- JD(S) (2)
- SP (1)

No.	Constituency	Name of elected M.P.	Party affiliation
1	Bidar (SC)	Ramchandra Veerappa (expired on 18.7.2004)	Bharatiya Janata Party
1	Bidar (SC)	Narsing Hulla Suryawanshi (Elected in Dec 2004)	Indian National Congress
2	Gulbarga	Iqbal Ahmed Saradgi	Indian National Congress
3	Raichur	A. Venkatesh Naik	Indian National Congress
4	Koppal	K. Virupaxappa	Indian National Congress
5	Bellary	Gali Karunakara Reddy	Bharatiya Janata Party
6	Davangere	G.M. Siddeswara	Bharatiya Janata Party
7	Chitradurga	N.Y. Hanumanthappa	Indian National Congress
8	Tumkur	S. Mallikarjunaiah	Bharatiya Janata Party
9	Chikballapur	R.L. Jalappa	Indian National Congress
10	Kolar (SC)	K.H. Muniyappa	Indian National Congress
11	Kanakapura	Tejashwini Ramesh	Indian National Congress
12	Bangalore North	H. T. Sangliana	Bharatiya Janata Party
13	Bangalore South	Ananth Kumar	Bharatiya Janata Party
14	Mandya	Ambareesh	Indian National Congress
15	Chamarajnagar (SC)	Kagalvadi M. Shivanna	Janata Dal
16	Mysore	C. H. Vijayashankar	Bharatiya Janata Party
17	Mangalore	D. V. Sadananda Gowda	Bharatiya Janata Party
18	Udupi	Manorama Madhwaraj	Bharatiya Janata Party
19	Hassan	H. D. Devegowda	Janata Dal
20	Chikmagalur	D. C. Srikantappa	Bharatiya Janata Party
21	Shimoga	S. Bangarappa (Resigned on 10.3.2005)	Bharatiya Janata Party
21	Shimoga	S. Bangarappa (Elected on 6.6.2005)	Samajwadi Party
22	Kanara	Anant Kumar Hegde	Bharatiya Janata Party
23	Dharwad South	Manjunath Kunnur	Bharatiya Janata Party
24	Dharwad North	Pralhad Joshi	Bharatiya Janata Party
25	Belgaum	Suresh Angadi	Bharatiya Janata Party
26	Chikkodi (SC)	Jigajinagi Ramesh Chandappa	Bharatiya Janata Party
27	Bagalkot	Gaddigoudar Parvatagouda Chandanagouda	Bharatiya Janata Party
28	Bijapur	Basangouda Patil	Bharatiya Janata Party

== 15th Lok Sabha ==
Keys: BJP (18) INC (9) JD(S) (1)

No.	Constituency	Member of Parliament	Party affiliation	Roles and responsibilities
1	Chikkodi	Ramesh Vishwanath Katti	Bharatiya Janata Party	
2	Belgaum	Suresh Angadi	Bharatiya Janata Party	
3	Bagalkot	P. C. Gaddigoudar	Bharatiya Janata Party	
4	Bijapur (SC)	Ramesh Jigajinagi	Bharatiya Janata Party	
5	Gulbarga (SC)	Mallikarjun Kharge	Indian National Congress	Cabinet Minister, Labour and Employment (2009–2013), Cabinet Minister, Railways (2013–2014)
6	Raichur (ST)	Sanna Pakirappa	Bharatiya Janata Party	
7	Bidar	Dharam Singh	Indian National Congress	
8	Koppal	Shivaramagouda Shivanagouda	Bharatiya Janata Party	
9	Bellary (ST)	J. Shantha	Bharatiya Janata Party	
10	Haveri	Shivkumar Chanabasappa Udasi	Bharatiya Janata Party	
11	Dharwad	Pralhad Joshi	Bharatiya Janata Party	
12	Uttara Kannada	Anant Kumar Hegde	Bharatiya Janata Party	
13	Davanagere	G. M. Siddeshwara	Bharatiya Janata Party	
14	Shimoga	B. Y. Raghavendra	Bharatiya Janata Party	
15	Udupi Chikmagalur	D. V. Sadananda Gowda (resigned on 29 December 2011)	Bharatiya Janata Party	
15	Udupi Chikmagalur	K. Jayaprakash Hegde (elected on 12 March 2012)	Indian National Congress	
16	Hassan	H. D. Deve Gowda	Janata Dal	Lok Sabha Leader, Janata Dal (Secular)
17	Dakshina Kannada	Nalin Kumar Kateel	Bharatiya Janata Party	
18	Chitradurga (SC)	Janardhana Swamy	Bharatiya Janata Party	
19	Tumkur	G. S. Basavaraj	Bharatiya Janata Party	
20	Mandya	N. Chaluvaraya Swamy (resigned on 21 May 2013)	Janata Dal	
20	Mandya	Ramya Divya Spandana (elected on 24 August 2013)	Indian National Congress	
21	Mysore	Adagur H. Vishwanath	Indian National Congress	
22	Chamarajanagar (SC)	R. Dhruvanarayana	Indian National Congress	
23	Bangalore Rural	H. D. Kumaraswamy (resigned on 21 May 2013)	Janata Dal	
23	Bangalore Rural	D. K. Suresh (elected on 24 August 2013)	Indian National Congress	
24	Bangalore North	D. B. Chandre Gowda	Bharatiya Janata Party	
25	Bangalore Central	P. C. Mohan	Bharatiya Janata Party	
26	Bangalore South	Ananth Kumar	Bharatiya Janata Party	
27	Chikballapur	Veerappa Moily	Indian National Congress	Cabinet Minister, Law and Justice (2009–2011), Cabinet Minister, Corporate Affairs (2011–2012), Cabinet Minister, Petroleum and Natural Gas (2012–2014)
28	Kolar (SC)	K. H. Muniyappa	Indian National Congress	Minister of State, Railways (2009–2012), Minister of State (I/C), Micro, Small and Medium Enterprises (2012–2014)

== 16th Lok Sabha ==
Keys: BJP (15) INC (10) JD(S) (2) Vacant (1)

No.	Constituency	Member of Parliament	Party affiliation	Roles and responsibilities
1	Chikkodi	Prakash Hukkeri	Indian National Congress	
2	Belgaum	Suresh Angadi	Bharatiya Janata Party	
3	Bagalkot	P. C. Gaddigoudar	Bharatiya Janata Party	
4	Bijapur (SC)	Ramesh Jigajinagi	Bharatiya Janata Party	Minister of State, Drinking Water and Sanitation (2016–2019)
5	Gulbarga (SC)	Mallikarjun Kharge	Indian National Congress	Lok Sabha Leader, Indian National Congress, Chairman, Public Accounts Committee (2016–2019)
6	Raichur (ST)	B. V. Nayak	Indian National Congress	
7	Bidar	Bhagwanth Khuba	Bharatiya Janata Party	
8	Koppal	Karadi Sanganna Amarappa	Bharatiya Janata Party	
9	Bellary (ST)	B. Sriramulu (resigned on 18 May 2018)	Bharatiya Janata Party	
9	Bellary (ST)	V. S. Ugrappa (elected on 6 November 2018)	Indian National Congress	
10	Haveri	Shivkumar Chanabasappa Udasi	Bharatiya Janata Party	
11	Dharwad	Pralhad Joshi	Bharatiya Janata Party	
12	Uttara Kannada	Anantkumar Hegde	Bharatiya Janata Party	Minister of State, Skill Development and Entrepreneurship (2017–2019)
13	Davanagere	G. M. Siddeshwara	Bharatiya Janata Party	Minister of State, Civil Aviation (2014), Minister of State, Heavy Industries and Public Enterprises (2014–2016)
14	Shimoga	B. S. Yediyurappa (resigned on 21 May 2018)	Bharatiya Janata Party	
14	Shimoga	B. Y. Raghavendra (elected on 6 November 2018)	Bharatiya Janata Party	
15	Udupi Chikmagalur	Shobha Karandlaje	Bharatiya Janata Party	
16	Hassan	H. D. Deve Gowda	Janata Dal (Secular)	Lok Sabha Leader, Janata Dal (Secular)
17	Dakshina Kannada	Nalin Kumar Kateel	Bharatiya Janata Party	
18	Chitradurga (SC)	B. N. Chandrappa	Indian National Congress	
19	Tumkur	S. P. Muddahanumegowda	Indian National Congress	
20	Mandya	C. S. Puttaraju (resigned on 21 May 2018)	Janata Dal (Secular)	
20	Mandya	L. R. Shivarame Gowda (elected on 6 November 2018)	Janata Dal (Secular)	
21	Mysore	Pratap Simha	Bharatiya Janata Party	
22	Chamarajanagar (SC)	R. Dhruvanarayana	Indian National Congress	
23	Bangalore Rural	D. K. Suresh	Indian National Congress	
24	Bangalore North	D. V. Sadananda Gowda	Bharatiya Janata Party	Cabinet Minister, Railways (2014), Cabinet Minister, Law and Justice (2014–2016), Cabinet Minister, Statistics and Programme Implementation (2016–2019), Cabinet Minister, Chemicals and Fertilizers (2018–2019)
25	Bangalore Central	P. C. Mohan	Bharatiya Janata Party	
26	Bangalore South	Ananth Kumar (died on 12 November 2018)	Bharatiya Janata Party	Cabinet Minister, Chemicals and Fertilizers (2014–2018), Cabinet Minister, Parliamentary Affairs (2016–2018)
26	Bangalore South	Vacant from 12 November 2018		
27	Chikballapur	Veerappa Moily	Indian National Congress	Chairman, Standing Committee on Finance
28	Kolar (SC)	K. H. Muniyappa	Indian National Congress	

== 17th Lok Sabha ==
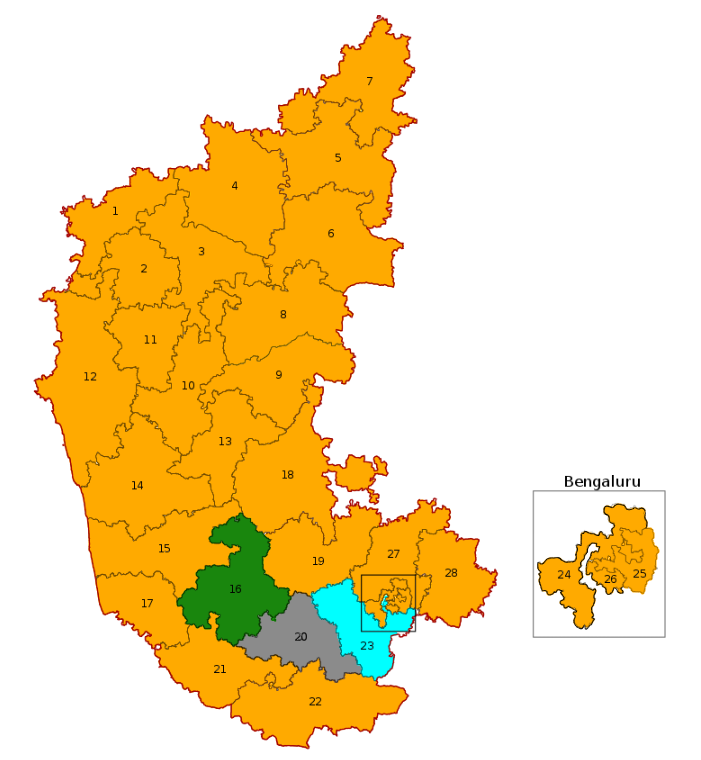
Karnataka constituencies

Keys: BJP (26) INC (1) JD(S) (1)

No.	Constituency	Name	Party
1	Chikkodi	Annasaheb Jolle	Bharatiya Janata Party
2	Belgaum	Suresh Angadi (Died on 23 September 2020)	Bharatiya Janata Party
2	Belgaum	Mangala Suresh Angadi (Elected on 2 May 2021)	Bharatiya Janata Party
3	Bagalkot	P. C. Gaddigoudar	Bharatiya Janata Party
4	Bijapur (SC)	Ramesh Jigajinagi	Bharatiya Janata Party
5	Gulbarga (SC)	Umesh. G. Jadhav	Bharatiya Janata Party
6	Raichur (ST)	Raja Amareshwara Naik	Bharatiya Janata Party
7	Bidar	Bhagwanth Khuba	Bharatiya Janata Party
8	Koppal	Karadi Sanganna Amarappa	Bharatiya Janata Party
9	Bellary (ST)	Devendrappa	Bharatiya Janata Party
10	Haveri	Shivkumar Chanabasappa Udasi	Bharatiya Janata Party
11	Dharwad	Pralhad Joshi	Bharatiya Janata Party
12	Uttara Kannada	Anant Kumar Hegde	Bharatiya Janata Party
13	Davanagere	G. M. Siddeshwara	Bharatiya Janata Party
14	Shimoga	B. Y. Raghavendra	Bharatiya Janata Party
15	Udupi Chikmagalur	Shobha Karandlaje	Bharatiya Janata Party
16	Hassan	Prajwal Revanna	Janata Dal (Secular)
17	Dakshina Kannada	Nalin Kumar Kateel	Bharatiya Janata Party
18	Chitradurga (SC)	A. Narayanaswamy	Bharatiya Janata Party
19	Tumkur	G. S. Basavaraj	Bharatiya Janata Party
20	Mandya	Sumalatha Ambareesh (Switched from Independent to BJP)	Bharatiya Janata Party
21	Mysore	Pratap Simha	Bharatiya Janata Party
22	Chamarajanagar (SC)	Srinivasa Prasad	Bharatiya Janata Party
23	Bangalore Rural	D. K. Suresh	Indian National Congress
24	Bangalore North	D. V. Sadananda Gowda	Bharatiya Janata Party
25	Bangalore Central	P. C. Mohan	Bharatiya Janata Party
26	Bangalore South	Tejasvi Surya	Bharatiya Janata Party
27	Chikballapur	B. N. Bache Gowda	Bharatiya Janata Party
28	Kolar (SC)	S. Muniswamy	Bharatiya Janata Party

== 18th Lok Sabha ==

The 18th Lok Sabha was constituted following the 2024 Indian general election conducted by the Election Commission of India. The state of Karnataka elects 28 Members of Parliament (MPs) to the Lok Sabha, the lower house of the Parliament of India. These members represent parliamentary constituencies across the state and serve a term of five years unless the house is dissolved earlier. The following table lists the MPs from Karnataka elected to the 18th Lok Sabha and their respective constituencies and party affiliations.

Keys:

NDA (19)
- BJP (17)
- JD(S) (2)
INDIA (9)
- INC (9)

No.	Constituency	Name	Party
1	Chikkodi	Priyanka Jarkiholi	Indian National Congress
2	Belgaum	Jagadish Shettar	Bharatiya Janata Party
3	Bagalkot	P. C. Gaddigoudar	Bharatiya Janata Party
4	Bijapur (SC)	Ramesh Jigajinagi	Bharatiya Janata Party
5	Gulbarga (SC)	Radhakrishna	Indian National Congress
6	Raichur (ST)	G Kumar Naik	Indian National Congress
7	Bidar	Sagar Khandre	Indian National Congress
8	Koppal	K. Rajashekar Basavaraj Hitnal	Indian National Congress
9	Bellary (ST)	E. Tukaram	Indian National Congress
10	Haveri	Basavaraj Bommai	Bharatiya Janata Party
11	Dharwad	Pralhad Joshi	Bharatiya Janata Party
12	Uttara Kannada	Vishweshwar Hegde Kageri	Bharatiya Janata Party
13	Davanagere	Prabha Mallikarjun	Indian National Congress
14	Shimoga	B. Y. Raghavendra	Bharatiya Janata Party
15	Udupi Chikmagalur	Kota Srinivas Poojary	Bharatiya Janata Party
16	Hassan	Shreyas M. Patel	Indian National Congress
17	Dakshina Kannada	Brijesh Chowta	Bharatiya Janata Party
18	Chitradurga (SC)	Govind Karjol	Bharatiya Janata Party
19	Tumkur	V. Somanna	Bharatiya Janata Party
20	Mandya	H. D. Kumaraswamy	Janata Dal (Secular)
21	Mysore	Yaduveer Wadiyar	Bharatiya Janata Party
22	Chamarajanagar (SC)	Sunil Bose	Indian National Congress
23	Bangalore Rural	C. N. Manjunath	Bharatiya Janata Party
24	Bangalore North	Shobha Karandlaje	Bharatiya Janata Party
25	Bangalore Central	P. C. Mohan	Bharatiya Janata Party
26	Bangalore South	Tejasvi Surya	Bharatiya Janata Party
27	Chikballapur	K. Sudhakar	Bharatiya Janata Party
28	Kolar (SC)	M. Mallesh Babu	Janata Dal (Secular)
