= M. S. Gurupadaswamy =

Indian politician (1924–2011)

- M. S. Gurupadaswamy

18th Leader of the House in Rajya Sabha
- In office December 1989 – November 1990
- Preceded by: P. Shiv Shankar
- Succeeded by: Yashwant Sinha

Leader of Opposition (Rajya Sabha)
- In office March 1971 – April 1972
- Preceded by: Shyam Nandan Mishra
- Succeeded by: Kamalapati Tripathi
- In office June 1991 – July 1991
- Preceded by: P. Shiv Shankar
- Succeeded by: S. Jaipal Reddy

Member of the Indian Parliament for Mysore
- In office 1952–1957 Serving with N. Rachaiah
- Preceded by: Seat established
- Succeeded by: M. Shankaraiya; S. M. Siddaiah

Personal details
- Born: 7 August 1924 Malangi, Kingdom of Mysore, (present-day Mysore district, Karnataka, India)
- Died: 10 May 2011 (aged 86) Bangalore, Karnataka, India
- Party: Janata Dal
- Other political affiliations: Janata Party; Indian National Congress; Kisan Mazdoor Praja Party
- Spouse: Rajasree
- Education: Maharaja's College, Mysore; Canning College, Lucknow

M. S. Gurupadaswamy (7 August 1922 – 10 May 2011) was an Indian politician. He was the Leader of House of Rajya Sabha from December 1989 to November 1990 and served twice as the Leader of the Opposition in Rajya Sabha during March 1971 to April 1972 and 28 June 1991 to 21 July 1991.

== Personal life ==
Gurupadaswamy was born in Malangi in Mysore district in August 1924. He was second among four brothers and five sisters.

He had his primary education in Malangi, and secondary education at Malavalli. He studied B.A. at Maharaja's College, Mysore and M.A., LL.B. at Canning College in Lucknow.

He married Rajasree on 21 May 1945. He has one son and two daughters.

== Political career ==
Gurupadaswamy was an independence activist. He took part in Quit India Movement in 1942. At that time, he was a member of All India Students Federation. After India's independence, he joined Kisan Mazdoor Praja Party. In 1952 general election, he was elected from Mysore to Lok Sabha. After the merger of his party and the Socialist Party in 1952 at the national level, Gurupadaswamy became the General Secretary of the Parliamentary Party.

Gurupadaswamy was a member of Rajya Sabha for 4 terms from Mysore from 1960 to 1966, from Uttar Pradesh from 1966 to 1972 and from Karnataka from 1984 to 1990 and from 1990 to 1992.

He was Minister of State for Atomic Energy in 1967. He was Minister of Agriculture and Food, Community Development and Cooperation in Indira Gandhi's Cabinet during 1967–69.

In 1969, when Congress split, Gurupadaswamy was one of the first Ministers to resign from Indira Gandhi's cabinet. Gurupadaswamy became Leader of the Opposition in Rajya Sabha in 1971. He was one of the founders of the Janata Party.

Gurupadaswamy served as Minister of Petroleum and Chemicals in V. P. Singh Ministry from 1989 to 1990.

== Publications ==
Gurupadaswamy published two books, namely Modern Trends in International Affairs and Communalism. He was editor of The Prajamata and president of Mysore State Journalists' Association.
