= Leader of the Opposition in Rajya Sabha =

Caucus head of the opposition party in the upper house of Indian parliament

Leader of the Opposition of Rajya Sabha
- Rājya Sabhā ke Vipakṣa ke Netā
- Rajya Sabha (Council of States)

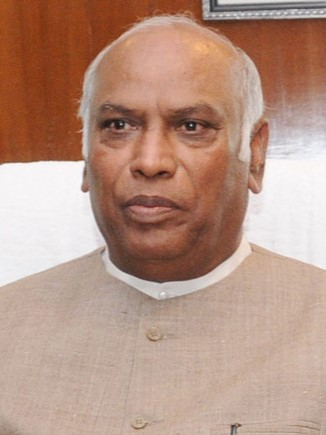
- Incumbent; Mallikarjun Kharge since 16 February 2021
- Style: The Honourable
- Type: Leader of the Opposition
- Status: Parliamentary Chairman of the Opposition Party
- Abbreviation: LoP
- Reports to: Parliament of India
- Residence: 10, Rajaji Marg, New Delhi
- Seat: Sansad Bhavan, New Delhi
- Nominator: MPs of the Official Opposition in the Council of States
- Appointer: Chairman of the Rajya Sabha
- Term length: 5 years (renewable)
- Inaugural holder: Shyam Nandan Prasad Mishra (1969–1971)
- Formation: 1969
- Deputy: Deputy Leader of Opposition
- Salary: ₹330,000 (US$3,400) (excl. allowances) per month
- Website: sansad.in/rs

The leader of the opposition in Rajya Sabha (IAST: Rājya Sabhā ke Vipakṣa ke Netā) is an elected member of Parliament, Rajya Sabha who leads the official opposition in the Upper House of the Parliament of India. The leader of the opposition in the Rajya Sabha is the parliamentary chairperson of the largest political party in the Rajya Sabha that is not in government.

The office holder ranks 7th in the Order of Precedence of India.

== History ==
In the Rajya Sabha until 1969, the title of opposition leader only existed de facto and had no formal recognition, status or privilege. Later, the leader of the opposition was given official recognition and their salary and allowances was extended by the Act, 1977. Since then, the leader in the Rajya Sabha should satisfy three conditions, namely,

1. he should be a member of the House
2. of the party in opposition to the Government having the greatest numerical strength and
3. be recognised by the chairperson of the Rajya Sabha

In December 1969, the Congress Party (O) was recognised as the main opposition party in the parliament while its leader, Shyam Nandan Mishra plays the role of opposition leader. M. S. Gurupadaswamy was later elected the leader of opposition in the Rajya Sabha after Shyam Nandan Prasad Mishra completed his tenure. However, Gurupadaswamy's appointment was declared with no formal announcement.

== Role and responsibilities ==
The Leader of Opposition (LoP) looks at government policies formulated for the rights of minorities and demands debate and criticises the government if ruling party tries to avoid debates on such policy. LoP also debates on the country's foreign relations and trade when it poses security threats on the national security.

== Privileges and salary ==
Opposition leaders play a significant role in government policies and their implementation by the ruling party. Sometimes, opposition leaders question government about the country's national security and development. After the constitution of India created a separate law on 1 November 1977 for opposition leaders, the salary was extended.

== List of leaders of the opposition in Rajya Sabha ==
Following members have been the leaders of the opposition in the Rajya Sabha.

No.	Portrait	Name (born – died) Constituency	Term of office			Political party	Government	Leader of House	Chairman (Tenure)
No official opposition (13 May 1952 – 17 December 1969)
1		Shyam Nandan Prasad Mishra (1920–2004); MP for Bihar	18 December 1969	11 March 1971	1 year, 83 days	Indian National Congress (O)	Indira II	Kodardas Kalidas Shah	Gopal Swarup Pathak (1969–1974)
2		M. S. Gurupadaswamy (1924–2011); MP for Uttar Pradesh	24 March 1971	2 April 1972	1 year, 9 days	Indian National Congress (O)	Indira III	Uma Shankar Dikshit	Gopal Swarup Pathak (1969–1974)
No official opposition (2 April 1972 – 30 March 1977)
3		Kamalapati Tripathi (1905–1990); MP for Uttar Pradesh	30 March 1977	15 February 1978	322 days	Indian National Congress (R)	Desai	L. K. Advani	B. D. Jatti (1974–1979)
4		Bhola Paswan Shastri (1914–1990); MP for Bihar	24 February 1978	23 March 1978	27 days	Indian National Congress (R)	Desai	L. K. Advani	B. D. Jatti (1974–1979)
(3)		Kamalapati Tripathi (1905–1990); MP for Uttar Pradesh	23 March 1978	8 January 1980	1 year, 291 days	Indian National Congress (R)	Desai	L. K. Advani	B. D. Jatti (1974–1979)
(3)		Kamalapati Tripathi (1905–1990); MP for Uttar Pradesh	23 March 1978	8 January 1980	1 year, 291 days	Indian National Congress (Urs)	Charan	K. C. Pant	Mohammad Hidayatullah (1979–1984)
5		L. K. Advani (born 1927); MP for Gujarat	21 January 1980	7 April 1980	77 days	Janata Party	Indira IV	Pranab Mukherjee	Mohammad Hidayatullah (1979–1984)
No official opposition (7 April 1980 – 18 December 1989)
6		P. Shiv Shankar (1929–2017); MP for Gujarat	18 December 1989	2 January 1991	1 year, 15 days	Indian National Congress (I)	Vishwanath	M. S. Gurupadaswamy	Shankar Dayal Sharma (1987–1992)
6		P. Shiv Shankar (1929–2017); MP for Gujarat	18 December 1989	2 January 1991	1 year, 15 days	Indian National Congress (I)	Chandra Shekhar	Yashwant Sinha	Shankar Dayal Sharma (1987–1992)
(2)		M. S. Gurupadaswamy (1924–2011); MP for Karnataka	28 June 1991	21 July 1991	23 days	Janata Dal	Rao	Vacant	Shankar Dayal Sharma (1987–1992)
7		S. Jaipal Reddy (1942–2019); MP for Andhra Pradesh	22 July 1991	29 June 1992	343 days	Janata Dal	Rao	Shankarrao Chavan	Shankar Dayal Sharma (1987–1992)
8		Sikander Bakht (1918–2004); MP for Madhya Pradesh	7 July 1992	16 May 1996	3 years, 314 days	Bharatiya Janata Party	Rao	Shankarrao Chavan	
8		Sikander Bakht (1918–2004); MP for Madhya Pradesh	7 July 1992	16 May 1996	3 years, 314 days	Bharatiya Janata Party	Rao	Shankarrao Chavan	K. R. Narayanan (1992–1997)
9		Shankarrao Chavan (1920–2004); MP for Maharashtra	23 May 1996	1 June 1996	9 days	Indian National Congress	Vajpayee I	Sikander Bakht	K. R. Narayanan (1992–1997)
(8)		Sikander Bakht (1918–2004); MP for Madhya Pradesh	1 June 1996	19 March 1998	1 year, 291 days	Bharatiya Janata Party	Deve Gowda	Inder Kumar Gujral	K. R. Narayanan (1992–1997)
(8)		Sikander Bakht (1918–2004); MP for Madhya Pradesh	1 June 1996	19 March 1998	1 year, 291 days	Bharatiya Janata Party	Deve Gowda	H. D. Deve Gowda	K. R. Narayanan (1992–1997)
(8)		Sikander Bakht (1918–2004); MP for Madhya Pradesh	1 June 1996	19 March 1998	1 year, 291 days	Bharatiya Janata Party	Gujral	Inder Kumar Gujral	K. R. Narayanan (1992–1997)
(8)		Sikander Bakht (1918–2004); MP for Madhya Pradesh	1 June 1996	19 March 1998	1 year, 291 days	Bharatiya Janata Party	Gujral	Inder Kumar Gujral	Krishan Kant (1997–2002)
10		Manmohan Singh (1932–2024); MP for Assam	19 March 1998	22 May 2004	6 years, 64 days	Indian National Congress	Vajpayee II	Sikander Bakht	Krishan Kant (1997–2002)
10		Manmohan Singh (1932–2024); MP for Assam	19 March 1998	22 May 2004	6 years, 64 days	Indian National Congress	Vajpayee III	Jaswant Singh	Krishan Kant (1997–2002)
10		Manmohan Singh (1932–2024); MP for Assam	19 March 1998	22 May 2004	6 years, 64 days	Indian National Congress	Vajpayee III	Jaswant Singh	Bhairon Singh Shekhawat (2002–2007)
11		Jaswant Singh (1938–2020); MP for Rajasthan	3 June 2004	16 May 2009	4 years, 347 days	Bharatiya Janata Party	Manmohan I	Manmohan Singh	Bhairon Singh Shekhawat (2002–2007)
11		Jaswant Singh (1938–2020); MP for Rajasthan	3 June 2004	16 May 2009	4 years, 347 days	Bharatiya Janata Party	Manmohan I	Manmohan Singh	Mohammad Hamid Ansari (2007–2017)
12		Arun Jaitley (1952–2019); MP for Gujarat	3 June 2009	26 May 2014	4 years, 357 days	Bharatiya Janata Party	Manmohan II	Manmohan Singh	Mohammad Hamid Ansari (2007–2017)
13		Ghulam Nabi Azad (born 1949); MP for Jammu and Kashmir	8 June 2014	10 February 2015	6 years, 252 days	Indian National Congress	Modi I	Arun Jaitley	Mohammad Hamid Ansari (2007–2017)
13		Ghulam Nabi Azad (born 1949); MP for Jammu and Kashmir	23 February 2015	15 February 2021	6 years, 252 days	Indian National Congress	Modi I	Arun Jaitley	Mohammad Hamid Ansari (2007–2017)
13		Ghulam Nabi Azad (born 1949); MP for Jammu and Kashmir	23 February 2015	15 February 2021	6 years, 252 days	Indian National Congress	Modi I	Arun Jaitley	M. Venkaiah Naidu (2017–2022)
13		Ghulam Nabi Azad (born 1949); MP for Jammu and Kashmir	23 February 2015	15 February 2021	6 years, 252 days	Indian National Congress	Modi II	Thawar Chand Gehlot	M. Venkaiah Naidu (2017–2022)
14		Mallikarjun Kharge (born 1942); MP for Karnataka	16 February 2021	Incumbent	5 years, 231 days	Indian National Congress	Modi II	Thawar Chand Gehlot	M. Venkaiah Naidu (2017–2022)
14		Mallikarjun Kharge (born 1942); MP for Karnataka	16 February 2021	Incumbent	5 years, 231 days	Indian National Congress	Modi II	Piyush Goyal	M. Venkaiah Naidu (2017–2022)
14		Mallikarjun Kharge (born 1942); MP for Karnataka	16 February 2021	Incumbent	5 years, 231 days	Indian National Congress	Modi II	Piyush Goyal	Jagdeep Dhankhar (2022–2025)
14		Mallikarjun Kharge (born 1942); MP for Karnataka	16 February 2021	Incumbent	5 years, 231 days	Indian National Congress	Modi III	J. P. Nadda	Jagdeep Dhankhar (2022–2025)
14		Mallikarjun Kharge (born 1942); MP for Karnataka	16 February 2021	Incumbent	5 years, 231 days	Indian National Congress	Modi III	J. P. Nadda	C.P. Radhakrishnan (2025- present)

== See also ==
- Vice-President of India (Chairperson of the Rajya Sabha)
- Deputy Chairperson of the Rajya Sabha
- Speaker of the Lok Sabha
- Leader of the Opposition in Lok Sabha
- Leader of the House in Rajya Sabha
- Leader of the House in Lok Sabha
- Secretary General of the Rajya Sabha

== Statistics ==
#	LoP in Rajya Sabha	Party	Terms	Length of term	
#	LoP in Rajya Sabha	Party	Terms	Longest tenure	Total tenure
1	Ghulam Nabi Azad	INC	2	6 years, 252 days	6 years, 252 days
2	Manmohan Singh	INC	2	6 years, 64 days	6 years, 64 days
3	Sikander Bakht	BJP	2	3 years, 314 days	5 years, 240 days
4	Mallikarjun Kharge	INC	2	5 years, 231 days	5 years, 231 days
5	Arun Jaitley	BJP	1	4 years, 357 days	4 years, 357 days
6	Jaswant Singh	BJP	1	4 years, 347 days	4 years, 347 days
7	Kamalapati Tripathi	INC(O) / INC(R)	2	1 year, 291 days	2 years, 248 days
8	Shyam Nandan Prasad Mishra	INC(O)	1	1 year, 83 days	1 year, 83 days
9	M. S. Gurupadaswamy	INC(O) / JD	2	1 year, 9 days	1 year, 32 days
10	P. Shiv Shankar	INC(I)	1	1 year, 15 days	1 year, 15 days
11	Jaipal Reddy	JD	1	343 days	343 days
12	L. K. Advani	JP	1	77 days	77 days
13	Bhola Paswan Shastri	INC(R)	1	27 days	27 days
14	Shankarrao Chavan	INC	1	9 days	9 days
Vacant			3	17 years, 218 days	32 years, 105 days
