= A. Siddaraju =

Indian politician from Karnataka

A. Siddaraju is an Indian politician from the state of Karnataka. A member of the Janata Dal and later the Indian National Congress, he represented the Chamarajanagar Lok Sabha constituency as a Member of Parliament.

== Political career ==
Siddaraju began his national legislative career in the mid-1990s. In the 1996 Indian general election, he contested from the Chamarajanagar constituency on a Janata Dal ticket. He was elected to the 11th Lok Sabha, defeating his nearest rival from the Indian National Congress.

Following the dissolution of the house, he successfully sought re-election in the 1998 general elections, retaining his seat for the 12th Lok Sabha. During this period, he was a notable figure within the Janata Dal faction in southern Karnataka. In the late 1990s, Siddaraju transitioned to the Indian National Congress. He contested the 1999 and 2004 Lok Sabha elections as a Congress candidate. Although he secured a significant portion of the vote share in both instances, he faced narrow defeats—first to V. Srinivas Prasad in 1999 and later to M. Shivanna of the JD(S) in 2004.

== Electoral performance ==
Electoral history of Siddaraju in the Chamarajanagar (SC) constituency is marked by the following results:

- 1996: Elected to the 11th Lok Sabha (Janata Dal).
- 1998: Elected to the 12th Lok Sabha (Janata Dal).
- 1999: Runner-up in the 13th Lok Sabha elections (INC).
- 2004: Runner-up in the 14th Lok Sabha elections (INC).

In more recent years, the Chamarajanagar seat has been held by V. Srinivas Prasad (BJP, 2019) and currently by Sunil Bose (INC, elected in 2024).

== See also ==
- Politics of Karnataka
- List of Lok Sabha members from Karnataka
