= Sunil Bose =

Indian politician

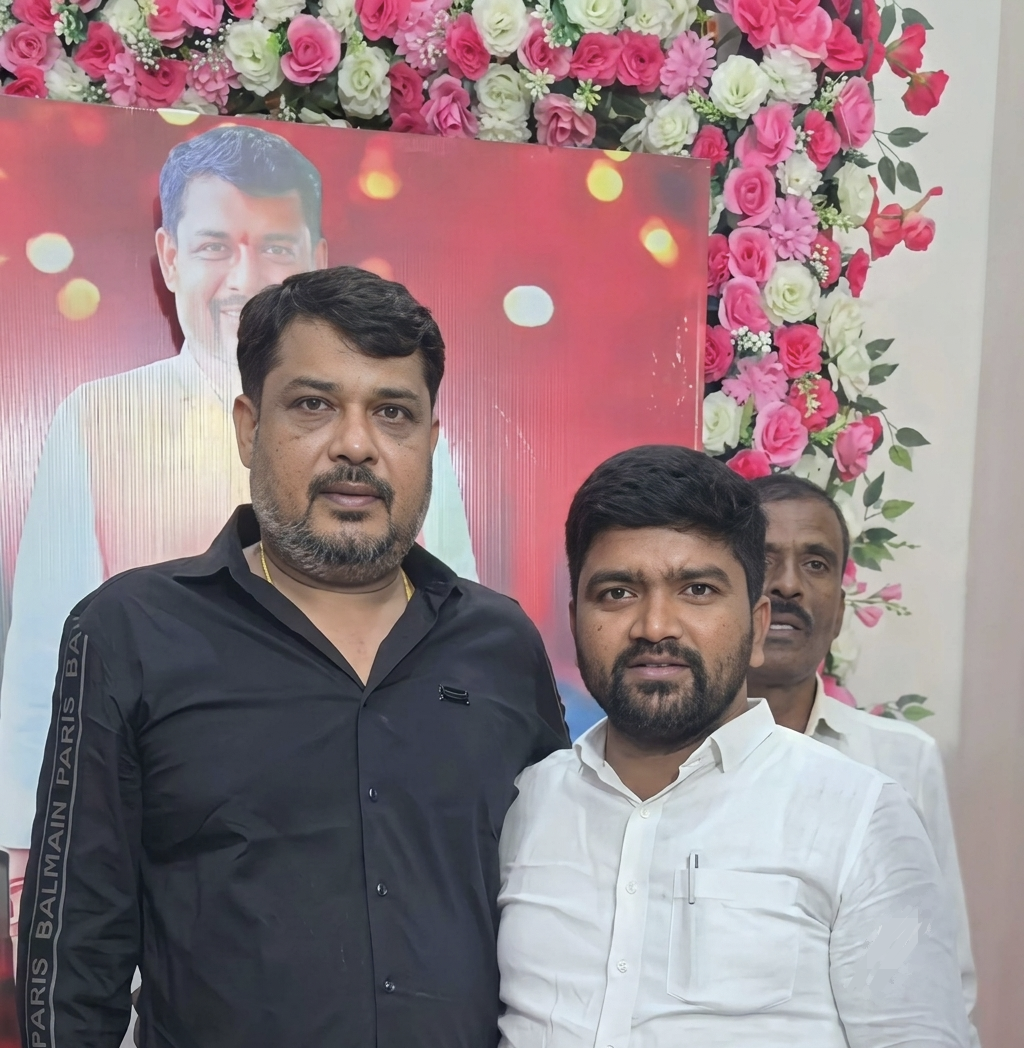
- Bose (Left) in 2026

Member of Parliament, Lok Sabha
- Incumbent
- Assumed office 4 June 2024
- Preceded by: Srinivasa Prasad
- Constituency: Chamarajanagar

Personal details
- Born: 31 August 1981 (age 45) Karnataka
- Party: Indian National Congress
- Parent(s): H. C. Mahadevappa, Mahadevamma

Sunil Bose is an Indian politician. He has been elected to Lok Sabha from Chamarajanagar Lok Sabha constituency. He is a member of Indian National Congress.
