= D. K. Naikar =

Indian politician

Member of Parliament, Lok Sabha
- In office 1980–1996
- Preceded by: Sarojini Mahishi
- Succeeded by: Vijay Sankeshwar
- Constituency: Dharwad North

President of Karnataka Pradesh Congress Committee
- In office 1995–1996
- Preceded by: V. Krishna Rao
- Succeeded by: Dharam Singh

Personal details
- Born: 7 July 1927 Koliwad, Bombay Presidency, British India (present-day Karnataka, India)
- Died: 31 July 1999 (aged 72)

Dyamappa Kallappa Naikar, commonly known as D. K. Naikar (7 July 1927 - 31 July 1999) was an Indian politician. He was born in Kolivad Village in Hubli Taluk of Dharwad district, Karnataka. He was a member of Lok Sabha from Dharwad North constituency in Karnataka State, India.

He was elected to 7th, 8th, 9th and 10th Lok Sabha from Dharwad North.
