= S. M. Siddaiah =

Indian politician (1918–2011)

S.M Siddaiah

Member of Parliament, Lok Sabha
- In office 1 April 1962 – 18 January 1977
- Preceded by: Seat established
- Succeeded by: B. Rachaiah
- Constituency: Chamarajanagar (SC)
- In office 5 April 1957 – 31 March 1962 Serving with M. Shankaraiya
- Preceded by: M. S. Gurupadaswamy; N. Rachaiah
- Succeeded by: M. Shankaraiya
- Constituency: Mysore

Personal details
- Born: August 15, 1918 Sosale
- Died: July 7, 2011 (aged 92) Mysuru
- Party: Indian National Congress (1952–1977), Janata Party (1977–2011), Kisan Mazdoor Praja Party (until 1952)
- Spouse: D. Mahadevamma
- Children: 7; 4 sons and 3 daughters

S. M. Siddaiah (1918–2011) was an Indian politician who was a Member of the Indian National Congress and held many posts in the Union Government and MP for the Chamarajanagar constituency from 1957 to 1977. (Chamarajanagar seat was a part of Mysore seat before 1967) Siddaiah died in 2011.
