= P. Kondandaramaiah =

Indian academic (born 1945)

P. Kondandaramaiah (born 1945) is an Indian academic and scholar specializing in Dravidian linguistics. He is widely recognized for his extensive research on the Telugu language and his leadership in promoting Dravidian studies in South India.

== Early life and education ==
Kondandaramaiah was born in 1945. He pursued his higher education in linguistics, focusing on the historical and comparative analysis of Dravidian languages, which laid the foundation for his future scholarly contributions.

== Career ==
Kondandaramaiah began his career with significant research into the structural evolution of Modern Telugu. His academic reputation was solidified with the publication of his seminal work, A Grammar of Modern Telugu, which remains a vital resource for linguists. From 2005 to 2010, he served as the Vice-Chancellor of Dravida University in Kuppam, where he was instrumental in expanding the university's research facilities and academic programs.

== Selected works ==
- A Grammar of Modern Telugu
- Comparative Studies in Dravidian Linguistics
- The Evolution of Telugu Prose
