= S. M. Guraddi =

Indian politician

S. M. Guraddi, formally known as Shri Shivashankarappa Mallappa Guraddi, was a prominent political figure from Karnataka who served as a Member of Parliament representing the Bijapur (now Vijayapura) constituency during the 8th Lok Sabha from 1984 to 1989. A dedicated member of the Janata Party, he emerged as a significant opposition leader during a period dominated by the Indian National Congress.

== Political career ==
His political journey began much earlier at the state level, where he was elected to the Karnataka Legislative Assembly in 1962 from the Muddebihal constituency. Throughout his career, he was recognized for his deep-rooted connection to the agrarian community of Northern Karnataka and his ability to bridge local grievances with national policy discussions.

In the halls of Parliament, Guraddi was an exceptionally active legislator, frequently challenging the government on matters of both regional development and national security. He was a persistent advocate for agricultural stability, often questioning the Ministry of Food and Civil Supplies regarding the procurement prices of wheat, rice, and bajra to ensure fair returns for farmers. Beyond agriculture, he showed a keen interest in technological and infrastructural advancement, pushing for the expansion of rural telephone exchanges and the modernization of inland waterways. He also demonstrated a strong stance on sovereignty and defence, notably raising alarms regarding the distribution of incorrect Indian maps by foreign embassies and inquiring into the production of sophisticated navigational systems for the armed forces.

Guraddi’s influence extended into the cooperative and social sectors of Karnataka as well. He played a pivotal role in local governance and financial institutions, notably serving as the President of the Sarakari Naukarara Sahakari Bank Niyamit in Vijayapura. His leadership was celebrated during the bank's 75th-anniversary milestone in 1987, an event attended by then-Chief Minister Ramakrishna Hegde, which underscored Guraddi's status as a respected elder statesman in the state. Even after his tenure in the Lok Sabha, his contributions remained highly regarded; upon his passing in late 2007, the Lok Sabha paid him a formal obituary tribute on November 29, 2007, acknowledging his lifelong commitment to public service and the welfare of the people of Karnataka.
