= N. Keshaveingar =

Nuggehalli Keshava Iyengar (1910–1970), commonly known as N. Keshava or Keshav, was a prominent Indian politician, lawyer, and social reformer who served as a Member of Parliament (MP) representing the Bangalore North constituency in the 1st Lok Sabha (1952–1957). He was a member of the Indian National Congress (INC) and served as the second Mayor of Bangalore.

== Early life and education ==
Born in 1910 into a Hebbar Iyengar family, he was formally known as Nuggehalli Keshava Iyengar. He was a distinguished academic and professional, eventually becoming a Fellow of the Indian Academy of Sciences in the Medicine section with a specialization in Forensic Sciences.

== Political career ==
Keshava Iyengar served as the second Mayor of Bangalore following the 1949 unification of the Cantonment and Pete areas. There was a significant social urban changes he reformed. In Social Reform: He famously dropped the caste-based suffix "Iyengar" from his name to be known simply as Keshav. For Caste Integration, he persuaded restaurant owners to remove "Brahmanara" (Brahmin) prefixes from their business names and encouraged the feeding of needy students. For Urban Infrastructure, The first auto-rickshaws were introduced to Bangalore during his term as Mayor.

Keshava represented the Bangalore North Lok Sabha constituency for two terms:

- 1st Lok Sabha (1952–1957): Elected in the first general elections of independent India.
- 2nd Lok Sabha (1957–1962): Re-elected in 1957 when the seat was briefly designated as Bangalore City. In this election, he defeated notable figures including Harindranath Chattopadhyaya.

== Death and legacy ==
Keshava Iyengar died on November 29, 1970. He is remembered as one of the "forgotten leaders" who helped shape modern Bangalore and its early parliamentary history. His victory in 1952 marked the beginning of a 45-year period of Congress dominance in the Bangalore North constituency.
