= K. G. Wodeyar =

Indian politician

K.G. Wodeyar

Member of Parliament, Lok Sabha
- In office 1952–1962
- Succeeded by: S. V. Krishnamoorthy Rao
- Constituency: Shimoga, Karnataka

Personal details
- Born: 30 November 1901
- Party: Indian National Congress

K.G. Wodeyar was an Indian politician, elected to the Lok Sabha, the lower house of the Parliament of India as a member of the Indian National Congress.
