= Kagalvadi M. Shivanna =

Indian politician

M. Shivanna

MP
- In office 13 May 2004 – 26 February 2009
- Preceded by: Srinivasa Prasad
- Succeeded by: R. Dhruvanarayana
- Constituency: Chamarajanagar

Personal details
- Born: 8 March 1948 (age 78) Kagalvadi, Mysore district, Mysore state (now Chamarajanagar district, Karnataka)
- Party: Bharatiya Janata Party (2017–present)
- Other political affiliations: Indian National Congress (Till 1998, 2003-2004, 2008-2017); Janata Dal (Secular) (2004-2008); Samata Party (2000-2003)
- Spouse: C. Deepa
- Children: 1 son and 1 daughter
- As of 25 September, 2006

M. Shivanna (born 8 March 1948) was a member of the 14th Lok Sabha of India. He represented the Chamarajanagar constituency of Karnataka and was a member of the Janata Dal (Secular) (JD(S)) political party. He was a member of National Commission for Scheduled Castes from 14 November 2010, later became the chairman of the same body till June 2014. He was president of Mysore district Youth Congress from 1977 till 1980 and became its general secretary in 1980. He won 2004 Indian general elections from Chamarajanagar Lok Sabha constituency as a Janata Dal (Secular) candidate and remained in Janata Dal (Secular) as a Member of Parliament till 2008 vote of confidence in the Manmohan Singh ministry where he voted for the Government and was expelled from the Party for cross voting as violating the whip. He joined Bharatiya Janata Party on 27 March 2017 in presence of B. S. Yediyurappa.
