= Shankar Dev =

Indian politician

MLA - Hyderabad State Legislative Assembly
- In office 1952–1957
- Minister: Deputy Minister; Later Minister in former Hyderabad State (1952–1956)

Member of Parliament in 2nd Lok Sabha
- In office 5 April 1957 – 31 March 1962
- Constituency: Bidar Lok Sabha constituency

Member of Parliament in 5th Lok Sabha
- In office 15 March 1971 – 18 January 1977
- Constituency: Bidar Lok Sabha constituency

Member of Parliament in 6th Lok Sabha
- In office 23 March 1977 – 22 August 1979
- Constituency: Bidar Lok Sabha constituency

Personal details
- Born: 1922 (age 103–104) Bidar, Karnataka
- Party: Indian National Congress
- Spouse: Padmavati (1950)
- Children: 2 sons and 3 daughters
- Parent: Balaji Rao
- Education: Gurukul University, Hardwar and Agra University.
- Awards: State award from the Govt of Karnataka for social service.

Shankar Dev was an Indian politician and three-time Member of Parliament in Lok Sabha (the lower house of the Parliament of India). He was also a Member of Hyderabad State Legislative Assembly and served as Deputy Minister and later Minister in former Hyderabad State from 1952 to 1956.

== Early life and background ==
Dev was born in Bidar, Karnataka in 1922. Balaji Rao was his father. He completed his education from Gurukul University, Hardwar and Agra University.

== Personal life ==
Shankar Dev married Padmavati in 1950 and the couple had two sons and three daughters.

== Career ==
He left politics and joined Sarvodaya and Bhoodan Movement along with Acharya Vinobaji from 1962 to 1971.

== Position held ==
- General Secretary - All India Depressed Classes League (1960–1962).

From	To	Position
1952	1956	Member of Hyderabad State Legislative Assembly.: Deputy Minister and later Minister in former Hyderabad State (1952–1956).
1956	1957	Member of Mysore Legislative Assembly.
1957	1962	MP (1st term) 2nd Lok Sabha from Bidar.
1971	1977	MP (2nd term) in 5th Lok Sabha from Bidar.
1977	1979	MP (3rd term) in 6th Lok Sabha from Bidar.

== Awards ==
Dev received a State award from the Govt of Karnataka for social service.
