= M. K. Shivananjappa =

Indian politician

Member of Parliament, Lok Sabha
- In office 1952-1967
- Succeeded by: S M Krishna
- Constituency: Mandya, Karnataka

Personal details
- Born: 5 July 1921 Mandya, British India
- Died: 1967 Mysore
- Party: Indian National Congress
- Spouse: leelamma
- Children: MS Athmananda MS Nithyananda MS sathyanand

M. K. Shivananjappa (1921–1967) was an Indian politician. He was elected to the Lok Sabha, lower house of the Parliament of India from Mandya, Karnataka as a member of the Indian National Congress, in 1952, 1957, 1962, 1967.

== Early life and education ==
M K Shivananjappa was born on July 5, 1921, to Kempe Gowda and Shrimati Leelavathi. He studied at Intermediate College, Bangalore and later at Maharaja's College, Mysore & Law College, Pune.
