= Sarojini Mahishi =

Indian politician

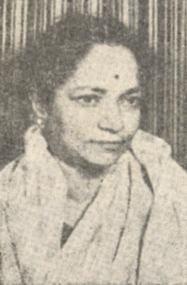

Minister of State for Law and Justice
- In office 1974–1976

Minister of State for Company Affairs
- In office 1974–1976

Minister of State for Tourism
- In office 1971–1974

Minister of State for Civil Aviation
- In office 1971–1974

Member of Parliament
- In office 1962–1980
- Preceded by: Dattatraya Parashuram Karmarkar
- Succeeded by: D. K. Naikar
- Constituency: Dharwad North

Personal details
- Born: Sarojini Bindurao Mahishi; 3 March 1927 Dharwad, Bombay Presidency, British India (present-day Karnataka, India)
- Died: 25 January 2015 (aged 87) Ghaziabad, Uttar Pradesh, India
- Party: Janata Party
- Other political affiliations: Indian National Congress
- Occupation: Teacher; Lawyer; Activist; Politician

Sarojini Bindurao Mahishi (3 March 1927 – 25 January 2015) was an Indian teacher, lawyer, activist and politician. She was the first woman Member of Parliament from the State of Karnataka, who represented the constituency Dharwad North for four terms between 1962 and 1980. In 1983 she was elected to the Rajya Sabha as member of the Janata Party.

Mahishi is best known for heading the committee appointed by the government of Karnataka in 1983 to recommend criteria for reservation in employment in the State. Submitting the recommendations in 1986, the committee recommended that a major percentage of employment in Karnataka should be reserved to the local people.

== Early life ==
Sarojini Mahishi was born to Kamalabai and Bindurao Mahishi on 3 March 1927 in Dharwad, a city in the erstwhile Bombay Presidency of British India (in present-day Karnataka). She was the second of eight children. Her father Bindurao was a leading advocate and Sanskrit scholar. Sarojini was schooled in the government-run schools of Dharwad before she attended Willingdon College in Sangli. She received a degree in law from the Raja Lakhamgouda Law College in Belgaum, and a master's degree in Sanskrit language.

== Career ==
Sarojini Mahishi began her career as a teacher and taught Sanskrit and law for a few years at Janata Shikshana Samiti College in Dharwad before joining the State Social Welfare Board.

During 1980 Indian general election, she was a member of Central Election Committee of Janata Party to select the candidates for election. In 1983, Sarojini Mahishi was elected to the Rajya Sabha from the state of Karnataka as a member of Janata Party. In 1989, she refused to accept the merger of Janata Party into Janata Dal. She continued to be member of Janata Party along with Indubhai Patel, Subramanian Swamy, Syed Shahabuddin and H. D. Deve Gowda.

Mahishi died on 25 January 2015 at her residence in Ghaziabad, Uttar Pradesh. Her remains were cremated in a crematorium in Lodi Road, Delhi, and her last rites were performed by her brother P. B. Mahishi.

=== Literary activities ===
Mahishi translated a number of Kannada and Marathi works into Hindi. Most prominent among them is the translation of Manku Thimmana Kagga of Kannada Poet D. V. Gundappa.

=== Positions held ===
- Member of Rajya Sabha
- Vice Chairperson of Rajya Sabha (1982–84)
- 4 time member of Lok Sabha from Dharwad North constituency
- President of Sansadiya Hindi Parishad
- President of Delhi Karnataka Sangha

== Sarojini Mahishi Report ==
The Ramakrishna Hegde government appointed Mahishi in 1983 to head the committee which recommended a certain percentage of jobs to Kannadigas in public sector undertakings, private companies and multinational companies. Pro Kannada lobby groups such as Karnataka Rakshana Vedike have been pressurising the implementation of Dr. Sarojini Mahishi Report in Karnataka

The committee headed by Mahishi included four retired officers of the Indian Administrative Service (IAS). The members were poet Gopalakrishna Adiga, G. K. Satya, K. Prabhakara Reddy, G. Narayana Kumar, a legislator, and retired IAS officers B. S. Hanuman and Siddayya Puranik.

=== Salient features of the Report ===
The committee was constituted in 1983, submitted interim report on 13.6.1984 and final report on 30.12.1986 and it made 58 recommendations. Of these recommendations, Government of Karnataka accepted 45 recommendations for implementation. Some of the recommendations are: 100 per cent reservation for Kannadigas in all State Government establishments and Public Sector units. 100 percent reservation for Kannadigas in group 'c' and group 'd' jobs in Central Government departments and PSUs operating in Karnataka. A Minimum of 80 percent and 65 reservation for Kannadigas for Group 'b' and Group 'a' jobs respectively, in Central Government units and PSUs operating in Karnataka. All Personnel officers in all industrial units in the state should invariably be a Kannadiga. Industries should appoint local people on priority.

=== Consequences ===
As an initiation towards implementation of Sarojini Mahishi report Government of Karnataka has established a separate department named "Kannada Abhivridhi Pradhikara" (Kannada Development Authority) to oversee that the accepted recommendations of the report are implemented in Karnataka effectively.

== List of works ==
- Sakuntala (1952)
- Kasuti Kale (1953)

== Awards ==
- Hindi Ratna Samman
- Honorary D Litt at the 58th annual convocation of Karnataka University
