= Tekur Subramanyam =

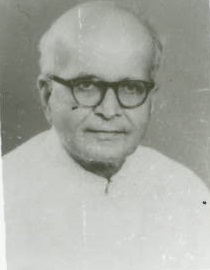

Member of the Indian Parliament for Bellary
- In office 1952–1967
- Preceded by: Position established
- Succeeded by: V. K. R. Varadaraja Rao

Personal details
- Born: 9 August 1900 Uravakonda, Madras Presidency, British India
- Died: 24 December 1974 (aged 74) Bangalore
- Spouse: Tekur Meenakshamma
- Education: Wardlaw High School, Bellary
- Alma mater: Pachaiyappa's College, Madras and Law College, Madras
- Occupation: Politician
- Website: Tekur Subramanyam

Tekur Subramanyam (Kannada: ಟೇಕೂರು ಸುಬ್ರಮಣ್ಯಂ) was an Indian Freedom Fighter and politician from Bellary, India. For his involvement in the Independence Movement, he was jailed several times by the British Colonial administration, many times at Bellary's Allipura Jail. Tekur was the first post-independence MP of Bellary, elected thrice in a row since 1952. He was also the Political Secretary to India's first Prime Minister, Jawaharlal Nehru.

In 2014 a book was released on his life that contained previously unseen articles, pictures and letters connected to Subramanyam.

== Biography ==
Tekur Subrahmanyam was born on 9 August 1900 at Uravakonda in Ananthapur District of then Madras Presidency (now in Andhra Pradesh).

Tekur, as he was popularly known, was a leader in Madras Presidency before independence when Ballari was part of the Presidency. He was Secretary of Madras Congress Legislature Party and also Political Secretary to Rajaji (1937–1939) who was then Prime Minister of Madras Presidency. After independence he became a prominent political leader in Karnataka when Ballari got merged with erstwhile Mysore state (now Karnataka) in 1953. As a leader he had direct links with national leaders including Gandhiji, Nehru, Rajaji, and others.

He participated in the freedom struggle in a big way and was imprisoned four times and put in different jails in the presidency including Central Jail: and Allipuram Jail in Ballari, Central Jail; Vellore , Central Jail :Tanjavuru at different times during freedom movement.

When in jail he was not allowed to communicate with others, his family members were allowed to see him once in a week, he had no access to either to Radio or to News Papers, all his correspondence was subjected to censorship, he was not informed when his son Sathyanarayana died in 1931, he was released on 15 days parole when his father Ramasastry died in November 1942 and was sent back to jail after parole period was over, he was not allowed to see his new born child in 1943 (Dr. Ramanath) whom he could see only after his release in 1944.

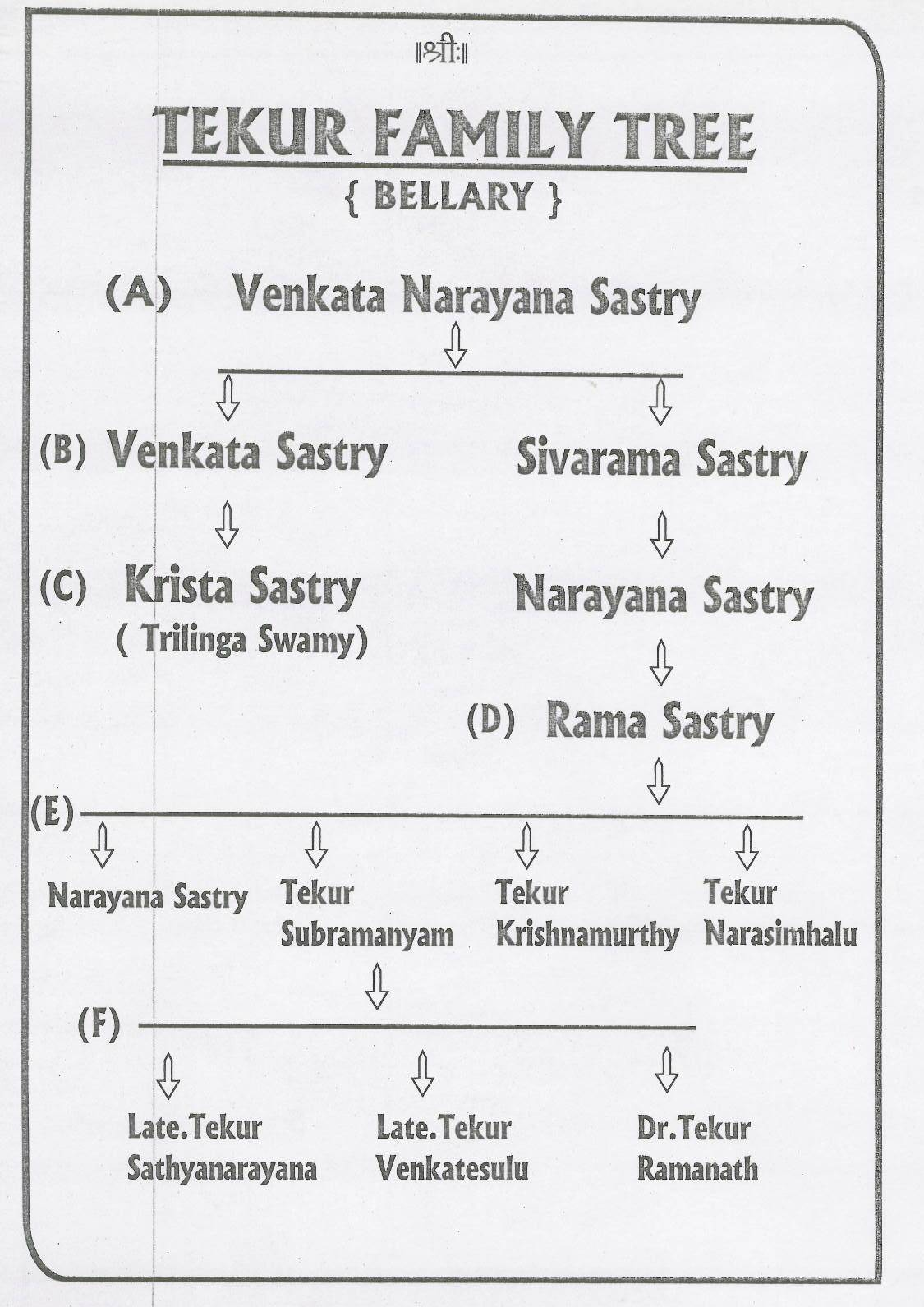
Family tree of Tekur Subramanyam

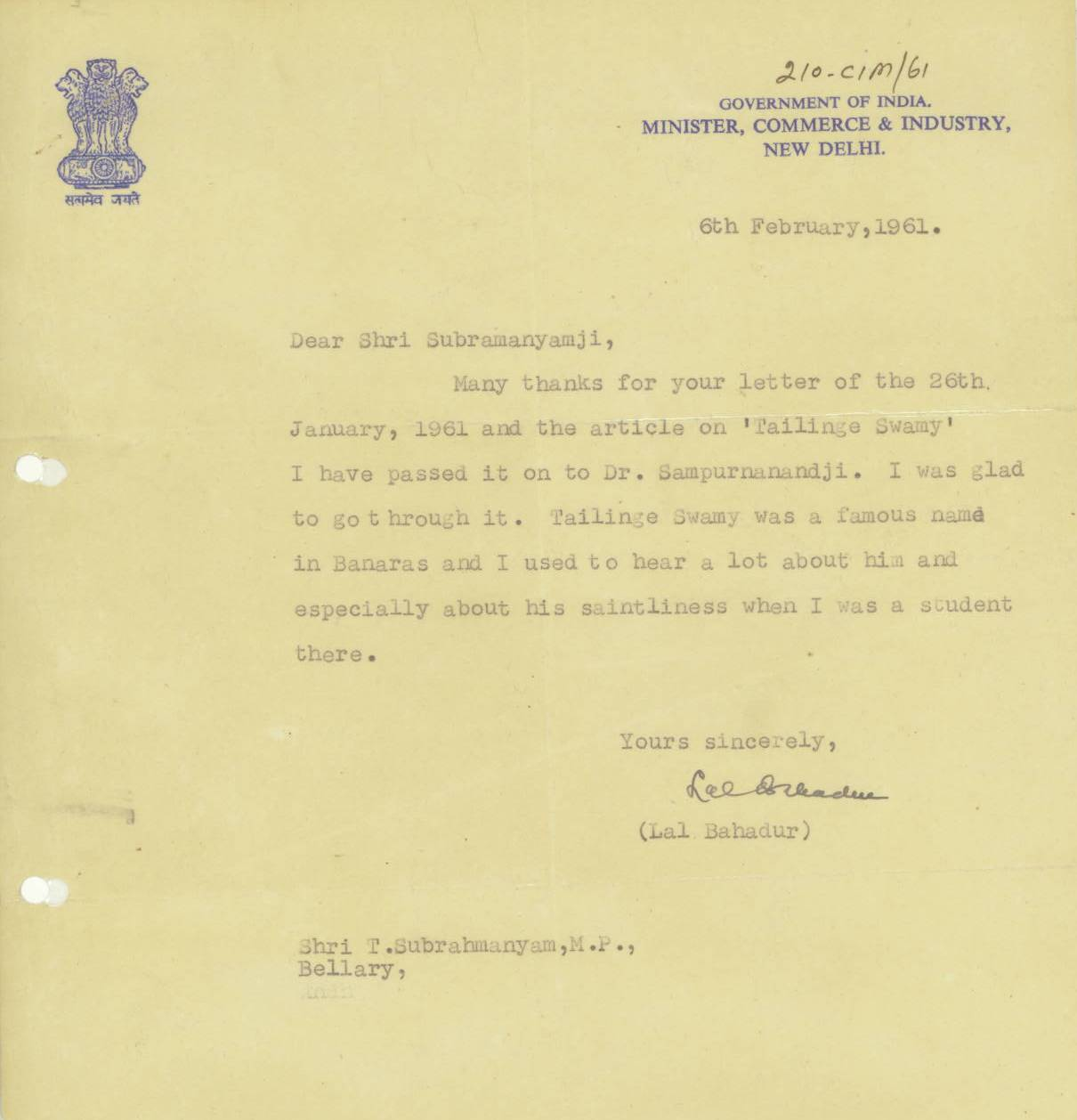
Shri Lal Bahadur Shastri Letter Tekur Subramanyam

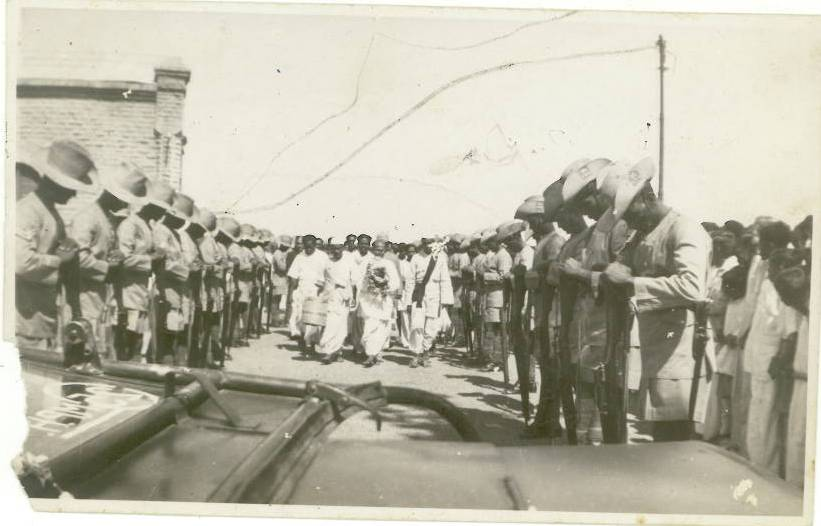
Tekur Subramanyam bringing Urn containing ashes of Gandhi ji from Delhi in 1948

When the country attained independence on 15 August 1947 the then Madras Government authorized Tekur to hoist National flag at Sambamoorhy maidan in Ballari at the stroke of midnight amidst intense jubilation. Tekur used to tell that he may not witness country attaining independence during his life time. Tekur brought Urn containing ashes of Gandhiji after his assassination in 1948 for immersion at Hampi in sacred Tunga Bhadra River.

After independence Tekur was elected to Lok Sabha from Ballari three times- in 1952, 1957 and in 1962 thus for 15 years he represented Ballari in the Lok Sabha. He was a distinguished Parliamentarian and used to actively participate in debates after dong lot of home work. He was regular like a student in attending sessions. He endeared himself with all the members of Parliament cutting across party lines. He became Secretary of Congress Party in Parliament in 1956 and also became political secretary to PM Nehru.

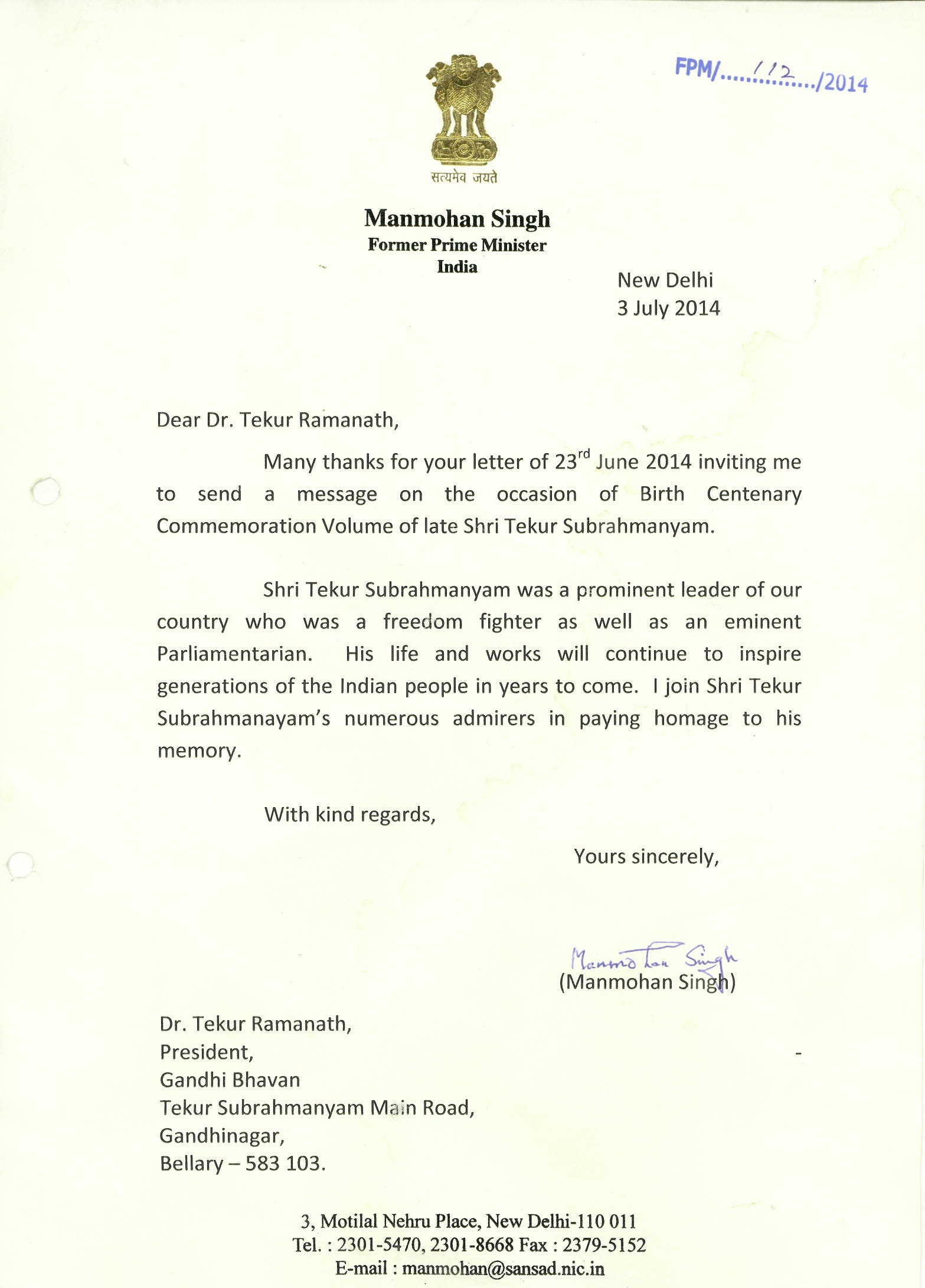
Letter from Prime Minister Dr. Manmohan Singh

Tekur always preferred stability in administration; he never aligned with any groups. In 1960 there were attempts to destabilize BD Jatti ministry in Mysore state. He approached Nehru who was then PM to prevent this crisis. Nehru immediately took appropriate action that saved Jatti Ministry. He also endorsed Tekur’ views he wrote "I entirely agree with you that frequent attempts to upset the Congress ministries are not desirable unless some basic principles are involved." Tekur was in favor of interlinking of major rivers in the country.

When his close friend Lal Bahadur Sastri became PM in 1965 Tekur was invited to join Union Cabinet as Minister. Tekur profusely thanked Sastri and politely declined the offer.

Tekur was instrumental in getting Ballari merged in to erstwhile Mysore State (now Karnataka) in 1953. He along with other state leaders including Nijalingappa, Hallikeri Gudlappa, RR Diwakar, Karnad Sadashiva Rao and others fought for unification of Karnataka state that finally became a reality in 1956.

He strongly pleaded for establishing a steel plant in public sector in Ballari-Hospet region. He also wanted laying of Broad gauge line in place of meter gauge for transporting ore to Madras and Bombay/Karwar ports and introduction of direct trains between Bombay and Madras via Ballari. He also pleaded for electrification Guntakal-Hubli line via Ballari

Tekur inducted M.Y. Ghorpade in to active politics in 1957. M.Y. Ghorpade later on became Finance Minister and RDPR Minister for many years and earned the goodwill of people of Karnataka for his services to the state. Tekur was a true Gandhian and believed in Gandhian Philosophy and thoughts. As a Chairman of Karnataka State Gandhi Smarak Nidhi for nearly a decade he played a vital role in propagating ideals of Gandhiji in Karnataka .

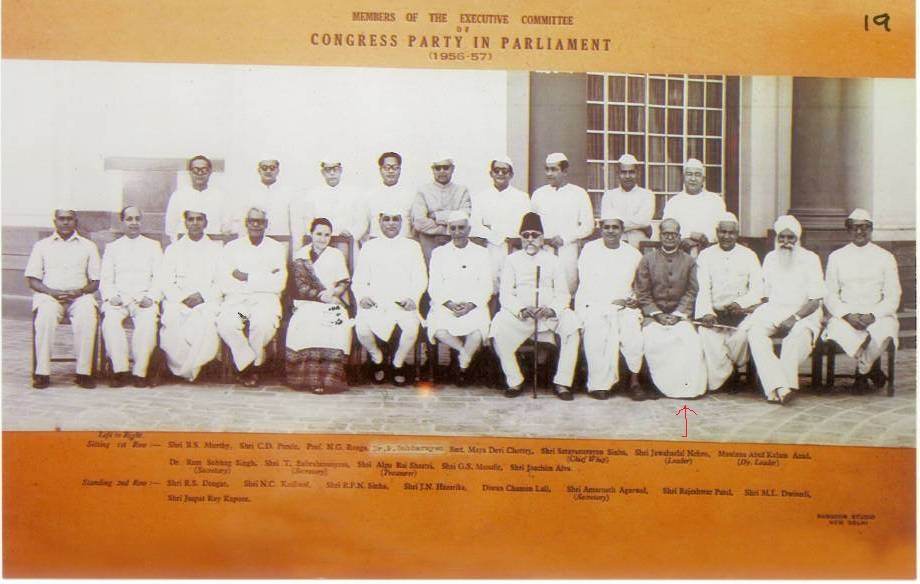
Congress Party in Parliament- Members of Executive Committee 1956–1957

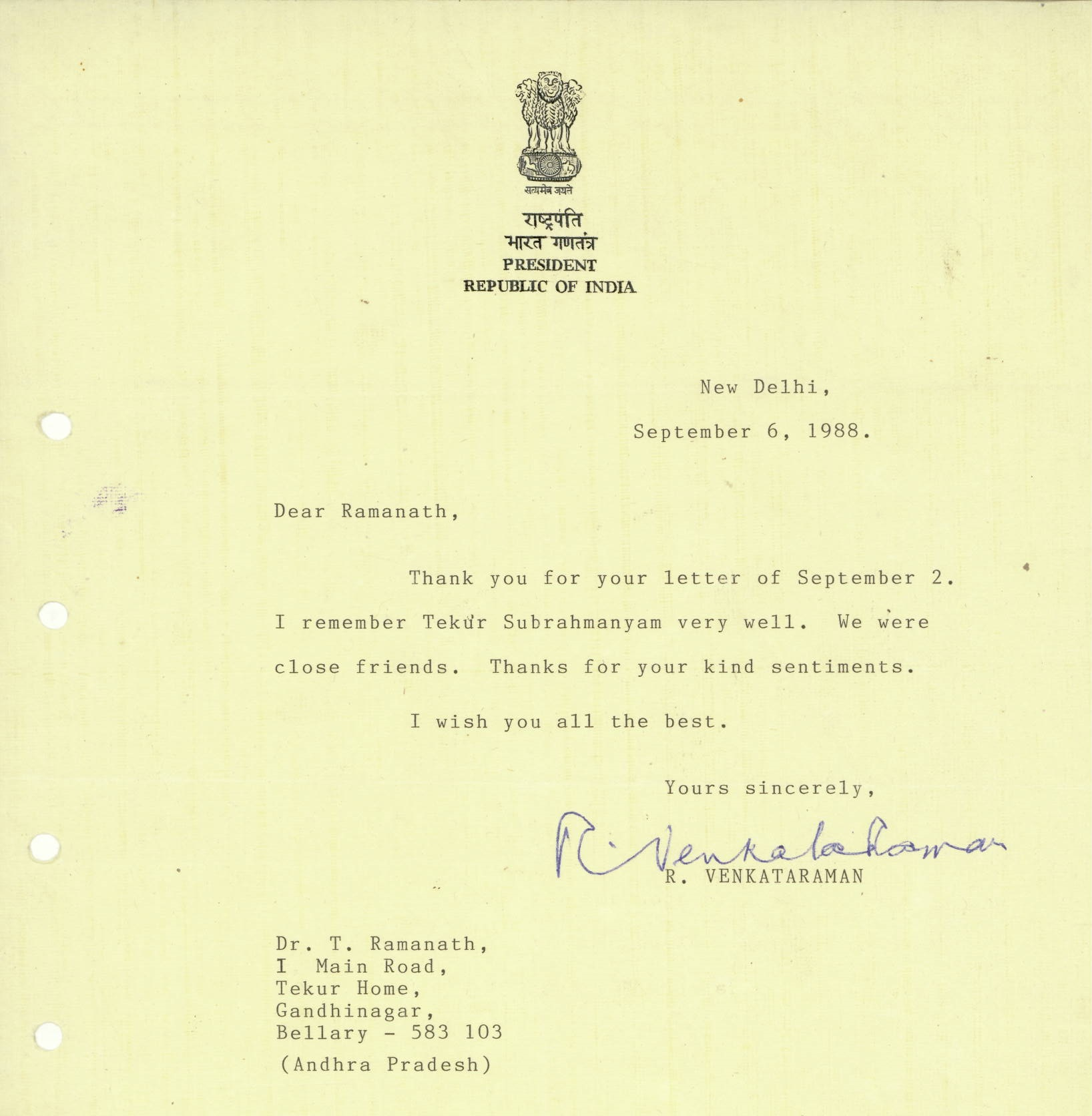
Letter from President of India Shri R Venkatraman

When his term as MP came to an end in 1967 he received a personal letter from then PM Mrs. Indira Gandhi- "We shall miss you in the new Lok Sabha but I sincerely hope your advice and guidance will continue to be available to me". Former President Venkataraman in a message said "Quiet and unostentatious by disposition, Tekur was a model legislator, he spoke briefly and effectively. He was respected by all the members of the Lok Sabha. Tekur ‘s life serves as a role model for succeeding generations of public and political workers". Mr.C.Subrmaniam another close associate of Tekur –former Union Agriculture Minister and former Governor of Maharastra says "I had the pleasure of knowing him when I was in Madras and later in Lok Sabha between 1962–1967 as MP. Tekur ‘s life is a shining example of how a politician should function. It would be appropriate for his life to be projected for the younger generation to follow". Former Prime Minister Dr.Manmohan Singh in a message to Dr.Tekur Ramanath (Tekur’son) says "Shri. Tekur Sunrhmanyam was a prominent leader of our country who was a freedom fighter and eminent parliamentarian. His life and works will continue to inspire generations of Indian people in years to come." Mr.MY Ghorpade former Minister and for whom Tekur was his political Guru and mentor mentions "Tekur was a gentle soul who radiated goodness and goodwill towards all. He was a true Gandhian. to him freedom was not just political but freedom from all kinds of deprivations and disparities. He recognized divinity in all human beings. To him elected positions were opportunities for service and not for power and money. He lived in a small house in Ballari and died in the same house."

Tekur Subrahmanyam died in Bangalore on 24 December 1974 after a brief illness at the age of 74.

To mark his birth centenary a glittering function was held in 2002 by District Administration. Mr.M.Y.Ghorpade the then RDPR and district in charge minister was the chief guest. A birth centenary commemoration volume was released, a Park behind BUDA office was named after him. Moka Road in Gandhinagar, Ballari was named after him. A memorial plaque at Central Jail was also put up in his honor.
