= K. Mallanna =

Indian politician (1926–2000)

Member of Parliament, Lok Sabha
- In office 1971–1984
- Preceded by: Kondajji Basappa
- Succeeded by: K.H. Ranganath
- Constituency: Chitradurga, Karnataka

Personal details
- Born: 7 April 1926 Kataveeramahally, Tumkur District, British India (now in Karnataka, India)
- Died: 1 March 2000 (aged 73)
- Party: Indian National Congress

Kamanna Mallanna (7 April 1926 – 1 March 2000) was an Indian politician, elected to the Lok Sabha, the lower house of the Parliament of India as a member of the Indian National Congress. He unsuccessfully contested 1989 Assembly elections from Kallambella as an Indian National Congress candidate against T. B. Jayachandra, who won as an independent. Mallanna died on 1 March 2000, at the age of 73.
