= K. G. Shivappa =

Indian politician

Member of Parliament, Lok Sabha
- In office 1991–1996
- Preceded by: S. Bangarappa
- Succeeded by: Ayanur Manjunath
- Constituency: Shimoga

Personal details
- Died: May 2012
- Party: Indian National Congress

K. G. Shivappa (c. 1940s – May 2012) was an Indian politician who served as a Member of Parliament (MP) in the Lok Sabha. He represented the Shimoga constituency in the state of Karnataka as a member of the Indian National Congress (INC) party.

== Political career ==
Shivappa had a prominent political career in Karnataka during the late 1980s and early 1990s. He was elected to the Lok Sabha from the Shimoga constituency twice, winning the general elections in 1989 and 1991.

One of his most notable political victories occurred during the 1991 Lok Sabha elections. Contesting on an Indian National Congress ticket, Shivappa defeated senior Bharatiya Janata Party (BJP) leader and future Chief Minister of Karnataka, B. S. Yediyurappa. Shivappa secured the Shimoga seat by a significant margin of approximately 41,000 votes, a major achievement in the region's political landscape.

== Personal life and death ==
In December 2010, Shivappa and his wife were involved in a severe car accident. Their vehicle rammed into a tree near Choradi on the Tumkur-Honnavar National Highway, leaving them with serious injuries.

Shivappa never fully recovered from the health complications resulting from the accident. He died in May 2012. He is survived by his family, including his son, K. S. Prashanth.

== See also ==
- 1989 Indian general election
- 1991 Indian general election
- Shimoga Lok Sabha constituency
