= Dharwad North Lok Sabha constituency =

Former constituency of the Indian parliament in Karnataka

Coordinates: 15.6°N 75.1°E

Dharwad
- Former Lok Sabha constituency

Constituency details
- Country: India
- Region: South India
- State: Karnataka
- Established: 1957
- Abolished: 2008
- Reservation: None

Dharwad North Lok Sabha constituency was a Lok Sabha (parliamentary) constituency in Karnataka state in southern India. With the implementation of the delimitation of parliamentary constituencies in 2008, it ceased to exist.

== Assembly segments ==
Dharwad North Lok Sabha constituency comprised the following eight Legislative Assembly segments:

1. Dharwad Rural
2. Dharwad
3. Hubli
4. Hubli Rural
5. Kalghatgi
6. Gadag
7. Naragund
8. Navalgund

== Members of Parliament ==
Election	Lok Sabha	Member	Party	Tenure
Bombay State (as Dharwad North)
1952	1st	Dattatraya Parasuram Karmarkar	Indian National Congress	1952 – 1957
After the Formation of Mysore State
1957	2nd	Dattatraya Parasuram Karmarkar	Indian National Congress	1957 – 1962
1962	3rd	Sarojini Mahishi	Indian National Congress	1962 – 1967
1967	4th	Sarojini Mahishi	Indian National Congress	1967 – 1971
1971	5th	Sarojini Mahishi	Indian National Congress	1971 – 1977
After the Renaming of Karnataka State
1977	6th	Sarojini Mahishi	Indian National Congress	1977 – 1980
1980	7th	D. K. Naikar	Indian National Congress	1980 – 1984
1984	8th	D. K. Naikar	Indian National Congress	1984 – 1989
1989	9th	D. K. Naikar	Indian National Congress	1989 – 1991
1991	10th	D. K. Naikar	Indian National Congress	1991 – 1996
1996	11th	Vijay Sankeshwar	Bharatiya Janata Party	1996 – 1998
1998	12th	Vijay Sankeshwar	Bharatiya Janata Party	1998 – 1999
1999	13th	Vijay Sankeshwar	Bharatiya Janata Party	1999 – 2004
2004	14th	Pralhad Joshi	Bharatiya Janata Party	2004 – 2009

2008 onwards: Constituency does not exist. See Dharwad Lok Sabha constituency and Haveri Lok Sabha constituency

== Detailed Result ==
Vote share of Winning candidates
2004	47.51%
1999	47.95%
1998	50.15%
1996	39.14%
1991	33.26%
1989	45.61%
1984	52.31%
1980	58.19%
1977	57.63%
1971	66.82%
1967	62.52%
1962	71.64%
1957	59.44%
1952	59.68%

=== 2004 ===
2004 Indian general election: Dharwad North
Party	Candidate	Votes	%	±%
BJP	Pralhad Joshi	385,084	47.51	
INC	B. S. Patil	302,006	37.26	
JD(S)	Shagoti Chikkappa Ningappa	52,572	6.49	
KNDP	Jagadguru Mate Mahadevi	27,616	3.41	
Independent	Badni Hemaraj Adiveppa	16,301	2.01	
BSP	Bakkai Laxman Chandrappa	12,987	1.60	
Independent	Kusugal Channa Basappa Shiddabasappa	8,582	1.06	
SP	Prof. Ashok Badiger	5,404	0.67	
Majority		83,078	10.25	
Turnout				
BJP hold		Swing		

=== 1999 ===
1999 Indian general election: Dharwad North
Party	Candidate	Votes	%	±%
BJP	Vijay Sankeshwar	345,197	47.95	
INC	Veeranna A. Mattikatti	303,595	42.17	
JD(S)	Kalebudde Ismailsab Abdul Gafar	71,147	9.88	
Majority		41,602	5.78	
Turnout		752,900	67.14	
BJP hold		Swing		

=== 1998 ===
1998 Indian general election: Dharwad North
Party	Candidate	Votes	%	±%
BJP	Vijay Sankeshwar	339,660	50.15	
INC	D. K. Naikar	210,459	31.07	
JD	Shankaranna Munvalli	113,763	16.80	
Independent	2 Independent Candidates	5,269	0.78	
Others	3 Other Party Candidates	8,135	1.20	
Majority		129,201	19.08	
Turnout				
BJP hold		Swing		

=== 1996 ===
1996 Indian general election: Dharwad North
Party	Candidate	Votes	%	±%
BJP	Vijay Sankeshwar	228,572	39.14	
JD	Munavalli Shankaranna Ishwarappa	188,221	32.23	
INC	D. K. Naikar	149,768	25.64	
Independent	18 Independent Candidates	17,479	3.00	
Majority		40,351	6.91	
Turnout		598,156	55.83	
Swing to BJP from INC		Swing		

=== 1991 ===
1991 Indian general election: Dharwad North
Party	Candidate	Votes	%	±%
INC	D. K. Naikar	157,682	33.26	
BJP	Bellad Chandrakant	135,891	28.66	
JD	B. R. Yavagal	134,565	28.38	
KRRS	G. S. Patil Kulkarni	34,520	7.28	
PBI	B. A. Bidanal	958	0.20	
Independent	12 Independent Candidates	10,485	2.23	
Majority		21,791	4.60	
Turnout				
INC hold		Swing		

=== 1989 ===
1989 Indian general election: Dharwad North
Party	Candidate	Votes	%	±%
INC	D. K. Naikar	276,545	45.61	
JD	Chandrakant Bellad	220,997	36.45	
KRRS	B. C. Patil	69,645	11.49	
JP	Sayyed Nijamuddin	13,405	2.21	
Independent	7 Independent Candidates	19,109	3.14	
Others	3 Other Party Candidates	6,677	1.11	
Majority		55,548	9.16	
Turnout				
INC hold		Swing		

=== 1984 ===
1984 Indian general election: Dharwad North
Party	Candidate	Votes	%	±%
INC	Naikar Dyamappa Kallappa	229,865	52.31	
JP	S. I. Shettar	185,014	42.11	
LKD	M. P. Laxmeshwar	8,510	1.94	
Independent	14 Independent Candidates	16,015	3.65	
Majority		44,851	10.20	
Turnout		450,810	62.63	
INC hold		Swing		

=== 1980 ===
1980 Indian general election: Dharwad North
Party	Candidate	Votes	%	±%
INC(I)	D. K. Naikar	208,269	58.19	
JP	Mahishi Sarojini Bindurao	111,575	31.17	
INC(U)	Sikkedesai Nanasaheb Balasaheb	25,851	7.22	
JP(S)	Hegade Ganapati Shridhar	7,493	2.09	
Independent	C. R. Patil Charantimath	2,668	0.75	
Independent	Jain Parsamal Lunachand Ji	1,597	0.45	
Independent	Korlahalli Somashekhar Fakirappa	488	0.14	
Majority		96,694	27.02	
Turnout		371,546	57.31	
Swing to INC(I) from INC		Swing		

=== 1977 ===
1977 Indian general election: Dharwad North
Party	Candidate	Votes	%	±%
INC	Mahishi Sarojini Bindurao	205,627	57.63	
JP	Joshi Jaganath Rao Anant	151,199	42.37	
Majority		54,428	15.26	
Turnout		368,014	68.74	
INC hold		Swing		

=== 1971 ===
1971 Indian general election: Dharwar North
Party	Candidate	Votes	%	±%
INC	Sarojini Bindurao Mahishi	189,382	66.82	
INC(O)	Wali Rachapa Gangappa	91,313	32.22	
PSP	S. P. Sirur	2,742	0.97	
Majority		98,069	34.60	
Turnout		293,135	63.39	
INC hold		Swing		

=== 1967 ===
1967 Indian general election: Dharwar North
Party	Candidate	Votes	%	±%
INC	M. S. Bindurao	169,173	62.52	
ABJS	J. R. Anantrao	81,743	30.21	
PSP	S. A. Khadar	19,679	7.27	
Majority		87,430	32.31	
Turnout		283,277	65.30	
INC hold		Swing		

=== 1962 ===
1962 Indian general election: Dharwar North
Party	Candidate	Votes	%	±%
INC	Sarojini Bindurao Mahishi	187,654	71.64	
SWA	Veerayya Virabasayya Shivalli	34,104	13.02	
ABJS	Ishwarappa Allamprabhu Menasinkai	30,163	11.51	
PSP	Hucheshwar Gurushidha Mudgal	10,036	3.83	
Majority		153,550	58.62	
Turnout		275,322	62.71	
INC hold		Swing		

=== 1957 ===
1957 Indian general election: Dharwar North
Party	Candidate	Votes	%	±%
INC	Karmarkar Dattatraya Parashuram	123,622	59.44	
Independent	Munavalli Basappa Nagappa	58,259	28.01	
ABJS	Joshi Jagannath Anantrao	26,106	12.55	
Majority		65,363	31.43	
Turnout		207,987	53.35	
INC hold		Swing		

=== 1952 ===
1952 Indian general election: Dharwar North
Party	Candidate	Votes	%	±%
INC	Karmaka Dattatraya Parsuramrao	129,077	59.68	
KMPP	Kambli Siddappa Totappa	87,206	40.32	
Majority		41,871	19.36	
Turnout		216,283	59.23	
INC win (new seat)				

== See also ==
- Dharwad district
- Dharwad Lok Sabha constituency
- Dharwad South Lok Sabha constituency
- Haveri Lok Sabha constituency
- List of former constituencies of the Lok Sabha
