= Rajaram Girdharilal Dubey =

Indian politician

Member of Parliament in 1st Lok Sabha
- In office 1952–1957
- Constituency: Bijapur North

Member of Parliament in 3rd Lok Sabha
- In office 1962–1967
- Constituency: Bijapur North

Personal details
- Born: Sholapur, Maharashtra.
- Party: Indian National Congress
- Spouse: Shrimati Nirmaladevi
- Children: 2 sons
- Parent: Shri Giridharlal

R. G. Dubey (Born as; Rajaram Girdharilal Dubey) was an Indian politician and Member of Parliament in 1st Lok Sabha and 3rd Lok Sabha.

== Early life and education ==
R. G. Dubey was born in Sholapur, Maharashtra. He completed his education at P.D. J.D. Darbar High Schools, Bijapur.

== Political career ==
R. G. Dubey started working as a congress worker in 1930. He was General Secretary of the Mysore Pradesh Congress Committee in 1960.

== Positions held ==
#	From	To	Position
	1939	1941	President of Bijapur Municipality.
	1944	1948	President of Bijapur D.C.C.
	1957	1959	President of Bijapur D.C.C.
	1950	1952	President of Bijapur District Local Board.
	1952	1957	MP in 1st Lok Sabha from Bijapur North, Bombay State.: Parliamentary Secretary to the Minister of Production (1953 - 1957).
	1962	1967	MP in 3rd Lok Sabha from Bijapur North, Mysore State.
