= Basanagouda Rudragouda Patil =

Indian politician (born 1938)

Member of the Indian Parliament for Bijapur
- In office 1996–1998
- Preceded by: Basangouda Gudadinni
- Succeeded by: Basangouda Patil Yatnal
- Constituency: Bijapur

Personal details
- Born: 10 January 1938 (age 88) Kanamadi, Bijapur district, Bombay Presidency, British India
- Party: Janata Dal
- Occupation: Lawyer, agriculturist, politician

Basanagouda Rudragouda Patil (born 10 January 1938) is an Indian politician, lawyer, and agriculturist from Karnataka. He served as a Member of Parliament in the 11th Lok Sabha, representing the Bijapur constituency on behalf of the Janata Dal party.

== Early life and background ==
Patil was born on 10 January 1938 in the village of Kanamadi in the Bijapur district of Karnataka (then part of the Bombay Presidency). He pursued a career in law and agriculture before fully dedicating himself to regional politics in northern Karnataka.

== Political career ==
Patil was an active political figure in the Bijapur region. Prior to his successful parliamentary run, he was deeply involved in state politics, contesting in the Karnataka Legislative Assembly elections from the Tikota constituency (a former assembly seat in Bijapur district) during the 1980s, where he was a prominent opponent to local leaders.

=== 11th Lok Sabha (1996–1998) ===
In the 1996 Indian general election, Patil contested from the Bijapur Lok Sabha constituency as a candidate for the Janata Dal. In a highly competitive race, he successfully secured the seat, winning 185,504 votes. He defeated his closest rival, Basanagouda Ramanagouda Patil of the Bharatiya Janata Party (BJP), by a margin of over 30,000 votes, and entered the 11th Lok Sabha.

His term in the Lok Sabha ended in 1998 following the early dissolution of the 11th Lok Sabha. He was succeeded in the Bijapur constituency by Basanagouda Patil Yatnal of the BJP in the subsequent 1999 elections.

== Electoral performance ==
Election Results for Bijapur Lok Sabha Constituency
Year	Lok Sabha	Party	Votes Secured	Opponent	Opponent Party	Result
1996	11th Lok Sabha	Janata Dal	185,504	Basanagouda Ramanagouda Patil	BJP	Won

== See also ==
- Bijapur Lok Sabha constituency
- List of members of the 11th Lok Sabha
- Elections in Karnataka
