= G. Y. Krishnan =

Indian politician (1929–2001)

Personal details
- Born: 4 October 1929 Madava Gurjenahalli, Kolar
- Died: 20 May 2001 (aged 71)
- Party: Indian National Congress
- Spouse: Saroja Lakshmi Devamma (1955)
- Children: 3 sons and 6 daughters
- Parent: G. M. Narayanaiah (father)
- Education: Maharaja's College, Mysore & Government Law College, Bangalore
- Profession: Advocate, Agriculturist and Social Worker

G.Y. Krishnan (4 October 1929 – 2 May 2001) was an Indian politician who served as a Member of Parliament on four occasions, representing the Kolar Constituency in the Lok Sabha, the lower house of the Indian Parliament. He was also Member of Parliamentary Delegation to Russia, 1976.

== Early life and background ==
G. Y. Krishnan was born on 4 October 1929 in the village of Madava Gurjenahalli in the Kolar district in Karnataka. He completed his education B.A. and B.L. from Maharaja's College, Mysore and Government Law College, Bangalore.

== Political career ==
In 1972, G. Y. Krishnan served as Vice President 1972 to 1976 of the Federation of Karnataka State Transport Corporation Employees Union. As President Advisor from 1967 to 1980 at Bharat Gold Mines Workers Union and Bharat Earth Movers Workers. He was the Founder and President of Akhil Bharat Wadder Samaj Sangh (Regd.) (Association of stone-cutters & earth diggers) (1968) and Builders India Ltd. (1978).

Krishnan was also a member of the committee on the Welfare of Scheduled Castes and Scheduled Tribes (1973 - 1976) and several joint select committees like Rubber Board and Central Silk Board.

== Personal life and death ==
Krishnan married Saroja Lakshmi Devamma in 1955. The couple had 3 sons and 6 daughters.

G. Y. Krishnan died on 20 May 2001, at the age of 72.

== Position held ==
#	From	To	Position
1	1972	1976	Vice President - Federation of Karnataka State Transport Corporation Employees Union
2	1967	1980	President Advisor - Bharat Earth Movers Workers' Union
3	1967	1970	Member of 4th Lok Sabha from Kolar (Lok Sabha constituency)
4	1971	1977	Member of 5th Lok Sabha from Kolar (Lok Sabha constituency)
5	1977	1979	Member of 6th Lok Sabha from Kolar (Lok Sabha constituency)
6	1980	1984	Member of 7th Lok Sabha from Kolar (Lok Sabha constituency)
