= Choudhari Kalingappa Bhimanna =

Indian politician

Choudhari Kalingappa Bhimanna was an Indian politician from Karnataka who served as a Member of Parliament in the 6th Lok Sabha and 7th Lok Sabha, representing the Bijapur Lok Sabha constituency as a member of the Indian National Congress.

== Early life ==
Little publicly documented information is available regarding Bhimanna's early life, education or professional background. Most published records concerning him relate to his parliamentary career and election results.

== Political career ==
=== Election to the 6th Lok Sabha (1977–1979) ===
Bhimanna entered Parliament after winning the 1977 general election. He contested from the Bijapur Lok Sabha constituency as a Congress candidate. The election followed the end of the Emergency. Congress suffered a major defeat across India. Bhimanna retained the Bijapur seat despite the national trend. He defeated Nagathan Irappa Chanamallappa of the Bharatiya Lok Dal. Karnataka remained one of the stronger states for Congress. He served in the 6th Lok Sabha from 1977 to 1979. He represented the largely agrarian Bijapur region. He raised issues related to irrigation, agriculture, and rural development.

=== Re election to the 7th Lok Sabha (1980–1984) ===
Fresh elections took place in 1980 after the Janata Party government fell. Bhimanna contested as the Congress (I) candidate. He again won the Bijapur constituency. He defeated Khed Ningappa Siddappa of the Janata Party. His victory came with the return of Indira Gandhi to power. Congress (I) formed the government at the Centre. Bhimanna served in the 7th Lok Sabha from 1980 to 1984.

=== Parliamentary tenure ===
Bhimanna represented the Bijapur parliamentary constituency for two consecutive terms. Available parliamentary records identify him as a member of the Lok Sabha from Karnataka, although detailed documentation of his parliamentary debates, committee memberships and legislative interventions remains limited in publicly accessible sources.

== Electoral performance ==
Election	Constituency	Party	Opponent	Result
1977 Indian general election	Bijapur Lok Sabha constituency	Indian National Congress	Nagathan Irappa Chanamallappa (BLD)	Elected
1980 Indian general election	Bijapur	Congress (I)	Khed Ningappa Siddappa (Janata Party)	Re-elected

== Legacy ==
Bhimanna is remembered primarily for representing the Bijapur Lok Sabha constituency during two consecutive parliamentary terms spanning the late 1970s and early 1980s. His electoral victories in both the post emergency election of 1977 and the Congress resurgence of 1980 place him among the Members of Parliament who served during an important transitional period in Indian political history.

== See also ==
- Bijapur Lok Sabha constituency
- Lok Sabha
- Indian National Congress
