= Bijapur North Lok Sabha constituency =

Former constituency of the Indian parliament in Karnataka

Coordinates: 16.87°N 75.71°E

Bijapur North
- Former Lok Sabha constituency

Constituency details
- Country: India
- State: Bombay State
- Established: 1952
- Abolished: 1967
- Reservation: None

Bijapur North Lok Sabha constituency was a former Lok Sabha constituency in Karnataka (Bombay State from 1952 to 1956). This seat came into existence in 1951. Before 1967 Lok Sabha Elections, it ceased to exist.

== Assembly segments ==
Bijapur North Lok Sabha constituency comprised the following six Legislative Assembly segments:

1. Bijapur
2. Indi Sindgi (2 Seats)
3. Hippargi Bagewadi
4. Managoli Bableswar
5. Jath
6. Muddebihal

After Bijapur district of erstwhile Bombay State got merged with Mysore State in 1956, this seat became a part of Mysore State and before 1967 Lok Sabha Elections, it ceased to exist and was replaced by Bijapur Lok Sabha constituency.

== Members of Parliament ==
Bombay State:

- 1951: Rajaram Girdharilal Dubey, Indian National Congress

Mysore State:

- 1957: Sugandhi Murigappa Siddappa, Indian National Congress
- 1962: Rajaram Girdharilal Dubey, Indian National Congress
- 1967 onwards:

Bijapur Lok Sabha constituency

== See also ==
- Bijapur South Lok Sabha constituency
- Bijapur Lok Sabha constituency
- Bagalkot Lok Sabha constituency
- Bijapur district
- Bagalkot district
- List of former constituencies of the Lok Sabha
