= Sidnal Shanmukhappa Basappa =

Indian politician (1936–2021)

Personal details
- Born: 6 April 1936; Sampagaon, Belgaum (Karnataka)
- Died: 2021
- Political party: Indian National Congress
- Spouse: Smt Sushila (8 May1966)
- Education: B.A, LL.B
- Profession: Lawyer & Agriculturist.

Sidnal Shanmukhappa Basappa (6 April 1936 – 27 April 2021) was an Indian politician from Indian National Congress. He served as the Member of Parliament from Belagavi in Karnataka, for four consecutive terms.

== Early life and background ==
Shanmukhappa was born at Sampagaon in Belgavi district (Karnataka). Basappa Sidnal (Indian freedom fighter) was his father.

== Personal life ==
Shanmukhappa was married to Smt. Sushila on 8 May 1966. and was the father of two sons and one daughter.

He died in 2021 from COVID-19 during the COVID-19 pandemic in India.

== Positions held ==
#	From	To	Position
1	1958	1962	President - Youth Congress, Belgaum district
2	1969	1973	General Secretary - D.C.C. Karnataka
3	1973	1976	Member of Karnataka Electricity Board
4	1980	1984	MP (1st term) in 7th Lok Sabha from Belgaum
5	1984	1989	MP (2nd term) in 8th Lok Sabha from Belgaum
6	1989	1991	MP (3rd term) in 9th Lok Sabha from Belgaum
6	6 Feb 1990	1991	Member of the Railway Convention Committee
6	1990	1991	Member of Consultative Committee, Ministry of Industry
7	1991	1996	MP (4th term) in 10th Lok Sabha from Belgaum
