= R. Ambanna Naik Dore =

Indian politician

Member of Parliament, Lok Sabha
- In office 1989–1991
- Preceded by: B. V. Desai
- Succeeded by: A. Venkatesh Naik
- Constituency: Raichur

Personal details
- Party: Indian National Congress

R. Ambanna Naik Dore (also known as R. Ambanna Naik) was an Indian politician who served as a Member of Parliament (MP) in the Lok Sabha. He represented the Raichur constituency in the state of Karnataka as a member of the Indian National Congress (INC) party.

== Political career ==
Dore was elected to the 9th Lok Sabha during the 1989 general elections. He succeeded B. V. Desai as the representative for Raichur. Contesting on the Indian National Congress ticket, he secured a significant victory.

In that election, Dore received 228,065 votes, defeating his closest rival, Nazeer Ahmed Sidsiddiqui of the Janata Dal, by a margin of 88,922 votes. He served until the dissolution of the 9th Lok Sabha and was succeeded by A. Venkatesh Naik in the subsequent 1991 elections.

== See also ==
- 1989 Indian general election
- Raichur Lok Sabha constituency
- 9th Lok Sabha
