= Basagondappa Kadappa Gudadinni =

Indian politician

Basagondappa Kadappa Gudadinni (1929–1995) was an Indian politician from Karnataka who served as a Member of Parliament in the Lok Sabha and as a member of the Karnataka Legislative Council.

== Early life and education ==
Basagondappa was born in 1929 in Sarawad, a village in the Bijapur district of Karnataka. He pursued a high level of academic achievement for his time, earning both a Bachelor of Science (B.Sc. Hons) and a Bachelor of Education (B.Ed.). Utilizing his qualifications, he dedicated the early part of his professional life to the classroom, serving as a teacher at S.S. High School in Bijapur until 1960, when he turned his focus toward his extensive political career.

== Political career ==
Gudadinni was a long-time member of the Indian National Congress, having joined the party in 1950. He represented the Bijapur constituency multiple times:

- Lok Sabha Member: He was elected to the 4th Lok Sabha (1967–1971), the 9th Lok Sabha (1989–1991), and the 10th Lok Sabha (1991–1995).
- Karnataka Legislative Council: He served as a member from 1974 to 1986 and held the position of Chairman of the Committee on Privileges.
- Roles and Committees: During his parliamentary career, he served on various committees, including the Committee on Petitions, the Committee on Government Assurances, and the Standing Committee on Railways.

== Professional and social activities ==
Beyond his legislative duties, Gudadinni was a multifaceted figure who made significant contributions to journalism and social welfare. He served as the editor of the Kannada weekly "Karnataka Sandesh," using the platform to engage with regional issues and public discourse. Deeply committed to social equity and education, he held leadership roles as the President of both the Ambedkar Educational Society and the Eshwar Vidya Vardhak Sangh, where he worked to expand academic opportunities for the community. His influence also extended into the economic sector through his leadership in the cooperative movement, serving as the Director and President of the Bijapur District Central Cooperative Bank and as a director for the Karnataka State Housing Corporation.

== Death ==
He died while serving as a sitting member of the 10th Lok Sabha on December 1, 1995, in Mumbai (then Bombay) at the age of 66. His wife, Lakshmibai Gudadinni, also later contested elections from the same constituency.
