= Srinivasa Prasad =

Indian politician (1947–2024)

Minister for Revenue & Muzrai, Government of Karnataka
- In office 30 May 2013 – 20 June 2016
- Preceded by: K. S. Eshwarappa
- Succeeded by: Kagodu Thimmappa

Minister of State for Ministry of Consumer Affairs, Food and Public Distribution, Government of India
- In office 13 October 1999 – 6 March 2004
- Preceded by: Raghuvansh Prasad Singh
- Succeeded by: Kantilal Bhuria; Suvra Mukherjee

Member of Parliament, Lok Sabha from Chamarajanagar
- In office 23 May 2019 – 29 April 2024
- Preceded by: R. Dhruvanarayana
- In office 1999–2004
- Preceded by: A. Siddaraju
- Succeeded by: R. Dhruvanarayana
- In office 1980–1996
- Preceded by: B. Rachaiah
- Succeeded by: A. Siddaraju

Member of the Karnataka Legislative Assembly
- In office 2008 – 20 October 2016
- Preceded by: D. T. Jayakumar
- Succeeded by: Kalale Keshavamurthy
- Constituency: Nanjangud

Personal details
- Born: 6 August 1947 Ashokapuram, Mysore, Kingdom of Mysore
- Died: 29 April 2024 (aged 76) Bangalore, Karnataka, India
- Party: Bharatiya Janata Party (2017–2024)
- Other political affiliations: Indian National Congress (1983–96, 1997–98, 2006–17); Janata Dal (Secular) (2004–06); Janata Dal (United) (1999–2004); Samata Party (1998–99); Independent (1996–97); Indian National Congress (Indira) (1979–83); Janata Party (1977–79)
- Spouse: Bhagyalakshmi
- Children: 3
- Education: University of Mysore
- Occupation: Politician

Venkataiah Srinivasa Prasad (6 August 1947 – 29 April 2024) was an Indian politician from the state of Karnataka, who was recognised as an important Dalit leader in the old Mysore region. He served as a union minister from 1999 to 2004 as part of the Third Vajpayee ministry, and later as Minister of Revenue in the Government of Karnataka from 2013 to 2016. Prasad was elected to the Lok Sabha from Chamarajanagar six times starting 1980. His last win came from the same constituency in 2019, before he announced his retirement from electoral politics in 2021.

== Early life ==
Prasad was born on 6 August 1947 into a Dalit family of M. Venkataiah and D. V. Puttamma in Ashokapuram, Mysore. Prasad was a volunteer of Rashtriya Swayamsevak Sangh from childhood until 1972 and was active in the Jan Sangh and Akhil Bharatiya Vidyarthi Parishad. Prasad was raised in Mysore where he also completed his education. He obtained a Bachelor of Science degree from Sarada Vilas College and a master's degree in political science from the University of Mysore.

== Career ==
Prasad entered electoral politics in 1974, in the by-election to Krishnaraja segment as an independent, to the Karnataka Legislative Assembly. He joined the Janata Party in 1976 and the Indian National Congress (INC) in 1979. He rejoined the INC before quitting it again in 1996, after being denied a ticket to contest the 1996 general election to the Lok Sabha. He contested the 1999 election and won with a Janata Dal (United) (JD(U)) ticket, before joining the Samata Party, headed by George Fernandes. Later, the Samata Party merged with the JD(U). In the Atal Bihari Vajpayee-led union government formed by the National Democratic Alliance that his party was a part of, Prasad served as the Minister of State for Food and Consumer Affairs, between 1999 and 2004. In 2003, Prasad's name propped in the Tehelka tapes controversy; tapes showed another Samata Party leader Jaya Jaitley allegedly telling an arms dealer to deposit the money with Prasad who was then in Bangalore. Prasad denied his involvement and stated that he was in Mysore during that time and that he "had filed a suit and the news portal later made it clear that they were mistaken."

In 2004, Prasad then returned to Karnataka State politics. He first had a short stint with Janata Dal (Secular) (JD(S)), joining the party, after quitting his position as union minister and as member of Samata Party, in March. He ruled out contesting the general election to the Lok Sabha that year and stated that his aim was to oust the "corrupt" INC government in Karnataka and help JD(S) form the next government in the State. Two years later, Prasad re-joined the INC. He was elected member of the legislative assembly of Karnataka from Nanjangud in 2013. Between 2013 and 2016, he served as Minister for Revenue & Muzrai in the Siddaramaiah-led government. He then changed his party again and officially joined the Bharatiya Janata Party (BJP), a party he had quit in 2005, in January 2017. He justified his re-entry to the BJP by stating that it was "no more a Hindutva outfit" and that their "outlook" had changed". This necessitated a by-poll in Nanjangud which he lost to the INC candidate. He was then appointed the vice-president of the State unit of the BJP.

Prasad contested Chamarajanagar in nine elections to the Lok Sabha and won on six occasions. In the Karnataka legislative assembly elections, he won from Nanjangud twice. He contested a total of fourteen elections and won eight.

== Personal life and death ==
Prasad was married to Bhagyalakshmi and had three daughters with her: Prathima, Poornima and Poonam. Prasad had converted to Buddhism.

Citing poor health, Prasad announced his retirement from politics again in March 2024, after 50 years of active politics. However, he extended support to the INC and a few of his relatives joined the party in April, ahead of the general election. In the same month, he was admitted to a hospital in Bangalore, and was being treated for respiratory and other ailments. He died on 29 April at the age of 76. The last rites were performed with full state honours the following day, and as per Buddhist rituals in Mysore.

The Chief Minister of Karnataka and Prasad's former colleague, Siddaramaiah, condoled his death and stated: "The departure of the leader who lived the struggle against injustice and inequality is a big setback for the political struggle for social justice in the state." Prime Minister Narendra Modi stated: "He was a champion of social justice, having devoted his life to the welfare of the poor, downtrodden and marginalised. He was very popular for his various works of community service." As a mark of respect, the government of Karnataka declared a one-day holiday in the districts of Mysore and Chamarajanagar.

Lok Sabha
Preceded by B. Rachaiah	Member of Parliament for Chamarajanagar; 1980–1996	Succeeded by A. Siddaraju
Preceded by A. Siddaraju	Member of Parliament for Chamarajanagar; 1999–2004	Succeeded by Kagalvadi M. Shivanna
Preceded by R. Dhruvanarayana	Member of Parliament for Chamarajanagar; 2019–2024	Succeeded by Vacant
