= B. Rachaiah =

Indian politician

Basavaiah Rachaiah
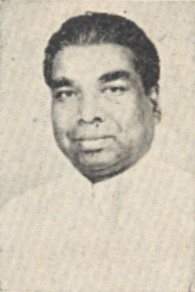

Governor of Kerala
- In office 20 December 1990 – 9 November 1995
- Preceded by: Sarup Singh
- Succeeded by: P. Shiv Shankar

6th Governor of Himachal Pradesh
- In office 16 February 1990 – 19 December 1990
- Preceded by: H. A. Brari (Additional charge)
- Succeeded by: Virendra Verma

Member of Parliament, Lok Sabha
- In office 1977–1980
- Preceded by: S.M. Siddaiah
- Succeeded by: Srinivasa Prasad
- Constituency: Chamarajanagar, Karnataka

Member of Parliament, Rajya Sabha
- In office 1974–1977
- Constituency: Karnataka

Personal details
- Born: 10 August 1922 Alur, Chamarajanagar District, British India
- Died: 14 February 2000 (aged 77)
- Party: Indian National Congress, Janata Dal

Basavaiah Rachaiah (10 August 1922 – 14 February 2000) was an Indian politician. He was a member of the Karnataka Legislative Assembly from Santhemarahalli and a member of the Rajya Sabha from Karnataka. He was elected to the Lok Sabha from Chamarajanagar Karnataka in 1977. He was the governor of Kerala and Himachal Pradesh and a Dalit leader, a member of the Karnataka state cabinets headed by S. Nijalingappa, B. D. Jatti, Devraj Urs, Veerendra Patil, Ramakrishna Hegde and S. R. Bommai.

Rachaiah was born in 1922 in Chamarajnagar and was an advocate by profession. One of his sons in Law, B. B. Ningaiah, was a minister in the government headed by J. H. Patel. Rachaiah died in 2000 aged 77.

== Legacy ==
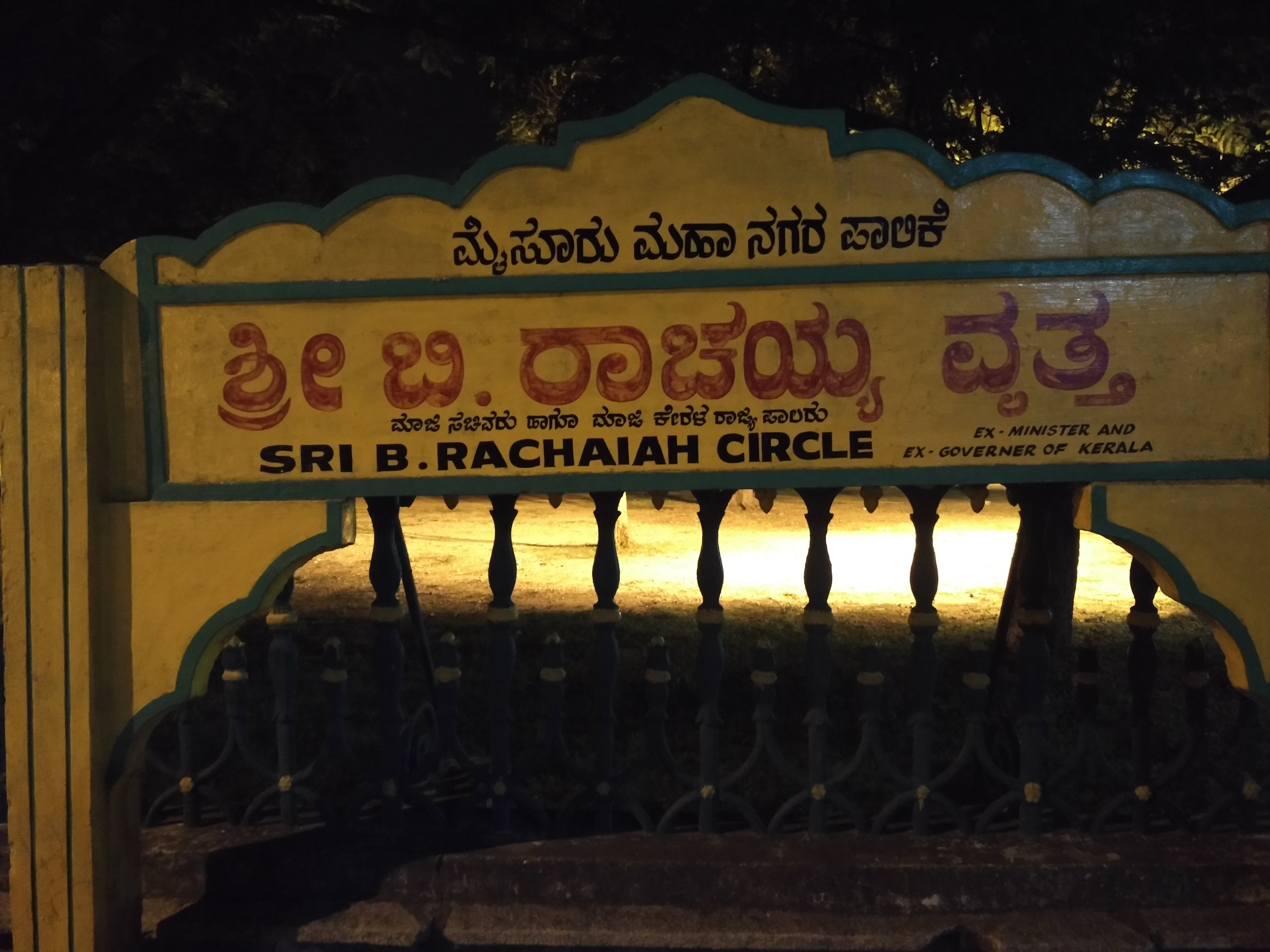
B Rachayya Circle on Sayyaaji Rao Road Mysore

For services rendered to the State, a circle on SayyajiRao Road in Mysore is named after Sri Rachaiah.

== See also ==
- List of governors of Himachal Pradesh
- List of governors of Kerala
