= Chamarajanagar Lok Sabha constituency =

Lok Sabha constituency in Karnataka, India

Coordinates: 11.9°N 76.9°E

Chamarajanagar
- Lok Sabha constituency

Constituency details
- Country: India
- Region: South India
- State: Karnataka
- Assembly constituencies: Heggadadevankote; Nanjangud; Varuna; T.Narasipur; Hanur; Kollegal; Chamarajanagar; Gundlupet
- Established: 1962
- Reservation: SC

Member of Parliament
- 18th Lok Sabha
- Incumbent Sunil Bose
- Party: Indian National Congress
- Elected year: 2024

Chamarajanagar Lok Sabha constituency is one of the 28 Lok Sabha constituencies in Karnataka state in southern India. Reserved for the Scheduled Castes, this constituency came into existence in 1962.

It shares border with Wayanad ,which is represented by Priyanka Gandhi.

== Assembly segments ==
The Chamarajanagar Lok Sabha constituency comprises the following Legislative Assembly segments:

No	Name	District	Member	Party	Party Leading (in 2024)
213	Heggadadevanakote (ST)	Mysore	Anil Kumar	INC	INC
214	Nanjangud (SC)	Mysore	Darshan Dhruvanarayana	INC	INC
219	Varuna	Mysore	Siddaramaiah	INC	INC
220	T.Narasipur (SC)	Mysore	H. C. Mahadevappa	INC	INC
221	Hanur	Chamarajanagar	M R Manjunath	JD(S)	INC
222	Kollegal (SC)	Chamarajanagar	A. R. Krishnamurthy	INC	INC
223	Chamarajanagar	Chamarajanagar	C. Puttarangashetty	INC	INC
224	Gundlupet	Chamarajanagar	H M Ganesh Prasad	INC	INC

== Members of Parliament ==
Year	Member	Party
Till 1962: Seat does not exist. See Mysore
1962	S. M. Siddaiah	Indian National Congress
1967	S. M. Siddaiah	Indian National Congress
1971	S. M. Siddaiah	Indian National Congress
1977	B. Rachaiah	Indian National Congress
1980	Srinivasa Prasad	Indian National Congress (I)
1984	Srinivasa Prasad	Indian National Congress
1989	Srinivasa Prasad	Indian National Congress
1991	Srinivasa Prasad	Indian National Congress
1996	A. Siddaraju	Janata Dal
1998	A. Siddaraju	Janata Dal
1999	Srinivasa Prasad	Janata Dal (United)
2004	Kagalvadi M. Shivanna	Janata Dal (Secular)
2009	R. Dhruvanarayana	Indian National Congress
2014	R. Dhruvanarayana	Indian National Congress
2019	Srinivasa Prasad	Bharatiya Janata Party
2024	Sunil Bose	Indian National Congress

== Election results ==
=== General Election 2024 ===
2024 Indian general election: Chamarajanagar
Party	Candidate	Votes	%	±%
INC	Sunil Bose	751,671	54.87	+10.27
BJP	Balaraj S.	5,62,965	41.10	−3.64
BSP	M. Krishna Murthy	15,903	1.16	−5.74
NOTA	None of the above	8,143	0.59	−0.41
Majority		1,88,706	13.77	+13.63
Turnout		13,70,336	77.04	
INC gain from BJP		Swing	13.91	

=== 2019 ===
2019 Indian general elections: Chamarajanagar
Party	Candidate	Votes	%	±%
BJP	V. Srinivas Prasad	568,537	44.74	+6.95
INC	R. Dhruvanarayana	5,66,720	44.60	−5.51
BSP	Dr. Shivakumara	87,631	6.90	+1.71
NOTA	None of the above	12,716	1.00	
Majority		1,817	0.14	−12.32
Turnout		12,70,725	75.35	+2.5
BJP gain from INC		Swing	-5.37	

=== 2014 ===
2014 Indian general elections: Chamarajanagar
Party	Candidate	Votes	%	±%
INC	R. Dhruvanarayana	567,782	50.11	
BJP	A. R. Krishna Murthy	4,26,600	37.65	
JD(S)	Kote M. Shivanna	58,760	5.18	
BSP	Shivamallu	34,846	5.19	
NOTA	None of the above	12,697	1.12	
Majority		1,41,182	12.46	
Turnout		11,33,326	72.85	
INC hold		Swing		

=== 2009 ===
2009 Indian general elections: Chamarajanagar
Party	Candidate	Votes	%	±%
INC	R. Dhruvanarayana	369,970	37.99	
BJP	A. R. Krishna Murthy	3,65,968	37.58	
JD(S)	Kote M. Shivanna	1,06,876	10.97	
BSP	N. Mahesh	68,447	7.03	
Majority		4,002	0.41	
Turnout		9,73,693	67.91	
INC gain from JD(S)		Swing		

=== 1980 ===
1980 Indian general election: Chamarajanagar
Party	Candidate	Votes	%	±%
INC(I)	V. Srinivas Prasad	228,748	58.53	
INC(U)	B. Rachaiah	1,18,287	30.27	
JP	S.M. Siddaiah	35,683	9.13	
Margin of victory		1,00,561	28.26	
Turnout		3,90,761	57.74	−5.25
INC(I) hold		Swing		

=== 1971 ===
1971 Indian general election: Chamarajanagar
Party	Candidate	Votes	%	±%
INC	S.M. Siddaiah	168,894	61.94	
INC(O)	N C Biligirirangaiah	96,272	35.31	
Independent	Nanjundaiah	7,514	2.76	
Margin of victory		72,622	26.63	
Turnout		2,72,680	58.81	
INC hold		Swing		

=== 1967 ===
1967 Indian general election: Chamarajanagar
Party	Candidate	Votes	%	±%
INC	S.M. Siddaiah	1,08,831	35.0	
SWA	N. C. B. Rangaiah	79,584	25.7	
Independent	M. Puttadevaiah	51,450	16.5	
Margin of victory		72,622	26.63	
Turnout		2,72,680	58.81	
INC hold		Swing		

== See also ==
- Chamarajanagar district
- List of constituencies of the Lok Sabha
