= V. Krishna Rao =

Indian politician

V. Krishna Rao (13 November 1925 – 2 December 2005) is an Indian politician from Karnataka. He was a member of the Indian National Congress from Karnataka. He served as three time member of the Lok Sabha representing Chikkaballapur (Lok Sabha constituency). He was elected to 8th, 9th and 10th Lok Sabha.

== Early life ==
Rao was born in Nakkalahalli, Gauribidanur Taluk in the erstwhile Kolar district, which is presently in Chikkaballapur district, Karnataka. His father Venkataramanappa was a farmer. He married Kamalamma in 1943. They have three sons and five daughters. He was also a farmer.

== Career ==
Rao was a three time Member of Parliament to the 8th, 9th and 10th Lok Sabhas. He was first elected as a member of Karnataka Legislative Assembly from Gauribidanur constituency. He served as a member of the Committee on Government Assurances and also in the Consultative Committee.

Before he became an MP, he was the president of the Taluk Congress Committee, Gauribidanur and General Secretary, D.C.C., Kolar.

He also served as president of Red Cross Society and as the vice president of the local Rotary Club.

He first became an MLA in 1972 representing Indian National Congress from Gauribidanur Assembly constituency winning the 1972 Mysore State Legislative Assembly election. Later, he won the Chikkaballapur Lok Sabha constituency, also on Indian National Congress ticket in the 1984 Indian general election in Karnataka. He then, went on to win the Chikkaballapura seat for two more times in 1989 and 1991. In 1991.

== Death ==
He died on 2 December 2005 in Nakkalahalli, Gauribidanur Taluk, presently in Chikkballapur district, Karnataka.
