= M. Shankaraiya =

M. Shankaraiya (also written as M. Shankariah) was an Indian politician and a member of the Indian National Congress. He served as a Member of Parliament (MP) during the 2nd Lok Sabha from 1957 to 1962, representing the Mysore constituency in the newly established Mysore State, which we now know as Karnataka.

== Early life and background ==
Information on Shankaraiya's specific birth and death dates is not as widely documented in digital archives as his legislative record. However, he was a prominent figure in the local Mysore administration prior to his tenure in the Lok Sabha. He was an advocate by profession and deeply involved in the legal and educational landscape of Mysore.

== Political career ==
Shankaraiya's political career was defined by his transition from state-level administration to the national parliament during a transformative period for Southern India.

- 2nd Lok Sabha (1957–1962): He contested the 1957 General Elections from the constituency, which at the time was a double-member seat.
- Election Victory: He was elected as the general category representative, while was elected as the representative for the Scheduled Castes seat.
- Vote Share: Shankaraiya secured 2,39,572 votes (approximately 31.7% of the total valid votes).
- Legislative Role: His term coincided with the aftermath of the States Reorganisation Act (1956). He played a role in the 2nd Lok Sabha during the integration of Kannada-speaking regions into the unified Mysore State.
