= List of members of the 2nd Lok Sabha =

Members of Lok Sabha (1957-62)

This is a list of members of the 2nd Lok Sabha arranged by state or territory represented. These members of the lower house of the Indian Parliament were elected to the 2nd Lok Sabha (1957 to 1962) at the 1957 Indian general election.

== Andhra Pradesh ==
Keys:
INC (37) CPI (2) PDF (2) IND (2)

No.	Constituency	Member	Party
1	Adilabad	K. Ashanna	Indian National Congress
2	Adoni	Pendekanti Venkatasubbaiah	Indian National Congress
3	Anantapur	T. Nagi Reddy	Communist Party of India
4	Chittoor	M. A. Ayyangar	Indian National Congress
5	Chittoor (SC)	M. V. Gangadhara Siva	Indian National Congress
6	Cuddapah	Vutukuru Rami Reddy	Indian National Congress
7	Eluru	Kumari Mothey Vedakumari	Indian National Congress
8	Golugonda	Missula Suryanarayana Murti	Indian National Congress
9	Golugonda (SC)	Kankipati Veeranna Padal	Indian National Congress
10	Gudiwada	D. Balarama Krishnaiah	Indian National Congress
11	Guntur	Kotha Raghuramaiah	Indian National Congress
12	Hindupur	K. V. Ramakrishna Reddy	Indian National Congress
13	Hyderabad City (SC)	Vinayak Rao Koratkar	Indian National Congress
14	Kakinada	Mosalikanti Thirumala Rao	Indian National Congress
15	Kakinada (SC)	Bayya Suryanarayana Murthy	Indian National Congress
16	Karimnagar	M. Sri Ranga Rao	Indian National Congress
17	Karimnagar (SC)	M. R. Krishna	Indian National Congress
18	Khammam	T. B. Vittal Rao	People's Democratic Front
19	Kurnool	Osman Ali S. Khan	Indian National Congress
20	Mahabubabad	Etikala Madhusudan Rao	Indian National Congress
21	Mahbubnagar	Janumpally Rameshwar Rao	Indian National Congress
22	Mahbubnagar (SC)	Puli Ramaswamy	Indian National Congress
23	Markapur (SC)	C. Bali Reddy	Indian National Congress
24	Masulipatnam	Mandali Venkata Krishna Rao	Indian National Congress
25	Medak	P. Hanmanth Rao	Indian National Congress
26	Nalgonda	Devulapalli Venkateswara Rao	People's Democratic Front
27	Nalgonda (SC)	Devanapalli Rajiah	Indian National Congress
28	Narasapur (SC)	Uddaraju Ramam	Communist Party of India
30	Nellore	R. Lakshminarasa Reddy	Indian National Congress
29	Nellore (SC)	B. Anjanappa	Indian National Congress
31	Nizamabad	Harish Chandra Heda	Indian National Congress
32	Ongole	Ronda Narappa Reddy	Indian National Congress
33	Parvathipuram (ST); 2-members seat	Dippala Suri Dora	Independent
34	Parvathipuram (ST); 2-members seat	B. Satyanarayana	Indian National Congress
35	Rajahmundry (ST)	Dr. Datla Satyanarayana Raju	Indian National Congress
36	Rajampet	T. N. Viswanatha Reddy	Indian National Congress
37	Secunderabad	Ahmed Mohiuddin	Indian National Congress
38	Srikakulam	Boddepalli Rajagopala Rao	Indian National Congress
39	Tenali	N. G. Ranga	Indian National Congress
40	Vicarabad	Sangam Laxmi Bai	Indian National Congress
41	Vijayawada	Dr. Komarraju Atchamamba	Indian National Congress
42	Visakhapatnam	Pusapati Vijayarama Gajapati Raju	Independent
43	Warangal	Sadath Ali Khan	Indian National Congress

== Assam ==
Keys:
INC (9) PSP (2) IND (1)

No.	Constituency	Member	Party
1	Autonomous District (ST)	Hynniewta Hoover	Independent
2	Cachar (SC)	Nibaran Chandra Laskar	Indian National Congress
3	Cachar	Dwarika Nath Tewari	Indian National Congress
4	Darrang	Bijoy Chandra Bhagavati	Indian National Congress
5	Dhubri	Amjad Ali	Praja Socialist Party
6	Dibrugarh	Jogendra Nath Hazarika	Indian National Congress
7	Gauhati	Hem Barua	Praja Socialist Party
8	Goalpara	Rani Manjula Devi	Indian National Congress
9	Goalpara (ST)	D. Basumatari	Indian National Congress
10	Jorhat	Mofida Ahmed	Indian National Congress
11	Nowgong	Liladhar Kotoki	Indian National Congress
12	Sibsagar	Prafulla Chandra Borooah	Indian National Congress

== Bihar ==
Keys:
INC (9) JP (6) CNSPJP (3) PSP (2) IND (1)

No.	Constituency	Member	Party
1	Aurangabad	Satyendra Narayan Sinha	Indian National Congress
2	Bagaha	Bibhuti Mishra	Indian National Congress
3	Banka	Shakuntala Devi	Indian National Congress
4	Barh	Tarkeshwari Sinha	Indian National Congress
5	Begusarai	Mathura Prasad Mishra	Indian National Congress
6	Bhagalpur	Banarsi Prasad Jhunjhunwala	Indian National Congress
7	Buxar	Kamal Singh	Independent
8	Champaran	Bipin Bihari Varma	Indian National Congress
9	Champaran (SC)	Bhola Raut	Indian National Congress
10	Chapra	Rajendra Singh	Praja Socialist Party
11	Chatra	Vijaya Raje	Chota Nagpur Santhal Parganas Janata Party
12	Darbhanga	Shree Narayan Das	Indian National Congress
13	Darbhanga (SC)	Rameshwar Sahu	Indian National Congress
14	Dhanbad	P. C. Bose	Indian National Congress
14	Dhanbad	D. C. Mallik (Bye election 1960)	Indian National Congress
15	Dumka	Suresh Chandra Chaudhury	Jharkhand Party
16	Dumka (ST)	Debi Soren	Jharkhand Party
17	Gaya	Brajeshwar Prasad	Indian National Congress
18	Giridih	Qazi S.A. Matin	Chota Nagpur Santhal Parganas Janata Party
19	Gopalganj	Dr. Syed Mahmud	Indian National Congress
20	Hajipur	Rajeshwara Patel	Indian National Congress
21	Hajipur (SC)	Dr. Chandra Mani Lal Chaudary	Indian National Congress
22	Hazaribagh	Lalita Rajya Laxmi	Chota Nagpur Santhal Parganas Janata Party
23	Jainagar	Shyam Nandan Prasad Mishra	Indian National Congress
24	Jamshedpur	Mohindra Kumar Ghosh	Indian National Congress
25	Katihar	Avadhesh Kumar Singh	Indian National Congress
25	Katihar	Bhola Nath Biswas (bye election 1958)	Indian National Congress
26	Kesaria	Dwarka Nath Tiwary	Indian National Congress
27	Khagaria	Jiyalal Mandal	Indian National Congress
28	Kishanganj	Mohammad Tahir	Indian National Congress
29	Lohardaga (ST)	Ignace Beck	Jharkhand Party
30	Madhubani	Anirudha Sinha	Indian National Congress
31	Maharajganj	Mahendra Nath Singh	Indian National Congress
32	Monghyr	Banarsi Prasad Sinha	Indian National Congress
33	Monghyr (SC)	Nayan Tara Das	Indian National Congress
34	Muzaffarpur	Shyam Nandan Sahay	Indian National Congress
35	Nalanda	Kailash Pati Sinha	Indian National Congress
36	Nawada	Satyabhama Devi	Indian National Congress
37	Nawada (SC)	Ram Dhani Das	Indian National Congress
38	Palamau	Gajendra Prasad Sinha	Indian National Congress
39	Patna	Sarangdhar Sinha	Indian National Congress
40	Pupri	Digvijay Narain Singh	Indian National Congress
41	Purnea	Phani Gopal Sen Gupta	Indian National Congress
42	Rajmahal (ST)	Paika Murmu	Indian National Congress
43	Ranchi East	M. R. Masani	Jharkhand Party
44	Ranchi West (ST)	Jaipal Singh	Jharkhand Party
45	Saharsa	Lalit Narayan Mishra	Indian National Congress
46	Saharsa (SC)	Bholi Sardar	Indian National Congress
47	Samastipur	Satya Narayan Sinha	Indian National Congress
48	Sasaram	Ram Subhag Singh	Indian National Congress
49	Sasaram (SC)	Jagjivan Ram	Indian National Congress
50	Shahabad	Bali Ram Bhagat	Indian National Congress
51	Singhbhum (ST)	Shambhu Charan Godsora	Jharkhand Party
52	Sitamarhi	J. B. Kripalani	Praja Socialist Party
53	Siwan	Jhulan Sinha	Indian National Congress

== Bombay State ==
Keys:
INC (38) PSP (5) SCF (5) CPI (4) PWPI (4) ABJS (2) IND (8)

No.	Constituency	Member	Party
1	Ahmedabad	Indulal Kanaiyalal Yagnik	Independent
2	Ahmedabad (SC)	Karsandas Ukabhai Parmar	Independent
3	Ahmednagar	Raghunath Keshav Khadilkar	Independent
4	Akola	Gopalrao Bajirao Khedkar	Indian National Congress
4	Akola	T S Patil (1960 bypoll)	Indian National Congress
5	Akola (SC)	Laxman Shrawan Bhatkar	Indian National Congress
6	Amravati	Panjabrao Deshmukh	Indian National Congress
7	Anand	Maniben Patel	Indian National Congress
8	Aurangabad	Swami Ramananda Tirtha	Indian National Congress
9	Banaskantha	Akbarbhai Dalumiya Chavda	Indian National Congress
10	Baramati	Keshavrao Marutirao Jedhe	Indian National Congress
11	Baroda	Fatesinghrao Pratapsinghrao Gaewad	Indian National Congress
12	Bhir	Rakhmaji Dhondiba Patil	Indian National Congress
13	Bhandara	Ramchandra Martand Hajarnavis	Indian National Congress
14	Bhandara (SC)	Balkrishna Ramchandra Wasnik	Indian National Congress
15	Bombay City Central	Shripad Amrit Dange	Communist Party of India
16	Bombay City Central (SC)	Gopal Kaluji Manay	Scheduled Castes Federation
17	Bombay City North	V. K. Krishna Menon	Indian National Congress
18	Bombay City South	S. K. Patil	Indian National Congress
19	Broach	Manishankar Bhat Chandrashanker	Indian National Congress
20	Buldana	Shivram Rango Rane	Indian National Congress
21	Chanda	V. N. Swami	Indian National Congress
22	Bulsar (ST)	Nanubhai Nichhabhai Patel	Indian National Congress
23	Dhulia	Uttamrao Laxmanrao Patil	Akhil Bharatiya Jana Sangh
24	Dohad (ST)	Jaljibhai Koyabhai Dindod	Indian National Congress
25	East Khandesh	Naushir Cursetji Bharucha	Praja Socialist Party
26	Girnar	Jayaben Shah	Indian National Congress
27	Gohilwad	Balwantrai Mehta	Indian National Congress
28	Halar	Jaisukhlal Lalshankar Hathi	Indian National Congress
29	Jalna	Saif F. B. Tyabji	Indian National Congress
29	Jalna	R. N. Rao	Indian National Congress
29	Jalna	A. Vnekatrao Ghare	Peasants and Workers Party of India
30	Kaira	F. R. D. Thakor	Independent
31	Karad	Dajisaheb Chavan	Peasants and Workers Party of India
32	Khed (SC)	Balasaheb Dagaduji Salunke	Scheduled Castes Federation
33	Kolaba	Rajaram Balkrishna Raut	Peasants and Workers Party of India
34	Kolhapur	Bhausaheb Raosaheb Mahagaonkar	Peasants and Workers Party of India
35	Kolhapur (SC)	Shankarrao Khanderao Dige	Scheduled Castes Federation
36	Kopargaon	Bapu Chandrasen Kamble	Independent
37	Kutch	Bhavanji Arjan Khimji	Indian National Congress
38	Madhya Saurastra	Manubhai Mansukhlal Shah	Indian National Congress
39	Malegaon	Yadav Narain Jadhav	Praja Socialist Party
40	Mandvi (ST)	Chhaganbhai Madaribhai Kedaria	Indian National Congress
41	Mehsana	Purushottamdas Rachhoddas Patel	Independent
42	Miraj	Balasahib alias Balwant Patil	Peasants and Workers Party of India
43	Nagpur	Anasuyabai Kale	Indian National Congress
44	Nanded (SC); Two-members seat	Dr. Devrao Namdevrao Pathrikar Kamble	Indian National Congress
45	Nanded (SC); Two-members seat	Harihar Rao Sonule	Scheduled Castes Federation
46	Nasik	B. K. Gaikwad	Scheduled Castes Federation
47	Osmanabad	Venkatrao Shriniwasrao Naldurgker	Indian National Congress
48	Panchmahals	Maneklal Maganlal Gandhi	Indian National Congress
49	Parbhani	Nagorao Kerojee Pangarkar	Indian National Congress
50	Patan	Motisinh Bahadursinh Thakore	Independent
51	Poona	Narayan Ganesh Goray	Praja Socialist Party
52	Rajapur	Nath Pai	Praja Socialist Party
53	Ramtek	Krishnarao Gulabrao Deshmukh	Indian National Congress
54	Ratnagiri	Premjibhai Ranchhoddas Assar	Akhil Bharatiya Jana Sangh
55	Satara	Nana Ramchandra Patil	Communist Party of India
56	Sabarkantha	Gulzarilal Nanda	Indian National Congress
57	Sholapur	Jayawant Ghanashyam More	Independent
58	Sholapur (SC)	Tayappa Hari Sonavane	Indian National Congress
59	Surat	Morarji Desai	Indian National Congress
60	Sorath	Narendra Paragji Nathwani	Indian National Congress
61	Thana	Shamrao Vishnu Parulekar	Communist Party of India
62	Thana (SC)	Laxman Mahadu Matera	Communist Party of India
63	Wardha	Kamalnayan Jamnalal Bajaj	Indian National Congress
64	West Khandesh (ST)	Laxman Vedu Valvi	Praja Socialist Party
65	Yeotmal	Dr. Deorao Yeshwantrao Gohokar	Indian National Congress
66	Zalawad	Ghanshyambhai Chhotalal Oza	Indian National Congress

== Delhi ==
Keys:
INC (5)

No.	Constituency	Member	Party
1	Chandni Chowk	Radha Raman	Indian National Congress
2	Delhi Sadar	Chaudhary Brahm Prakash	Indian National Congress
3	New Delhi	Sucheta Kripalani	Indian National Congress
3	New Delhi	Balraj Madhok (1961 bypoll)	Jana Sangh
4	Outer Delhi	C. Krishnan Nair	Indian National Congress
5	Outer Delhi (SC)	Naval Prabhakar	Indian National Congress

== Himachal Pradesh ==
Keys:
INC (5)

No.	Constituency	Member	Party
1	Chamba	Padam Dev	Indian National Congress
2	Mahasu	Dr.Yashwant Singh Parmar	Indian National Congress
3	Mahasu (SC)	Nek Ram Negi	Indian National Congress
4	Mahasu (SC)	S.N. Ramaul	Indian National Congress
5	Mandi	Jogendra Sen	Indian National Congress

== Kerala ==
Keys:
CPI (9) INC (6) PSP (1) IND (2)

No.	Constituency	Member	Party
1	Ambalapuzha	P. T. Punnoose	Communist Party of India
2	Badagara	Dr. K. B. Menon	Praja Socialist Party
3	Chirayinkil	M. K. Kumaran	Communist Party of India
4	Ernakulam	A. M. Thomas	Indian National Congress
5	Kesergod	A. K. Gopalan	Communist Party of India
6	Kottayam	Mathew Maniyangadan	Indian National Congress
7	Kozhikode	K. P. Kutti Krishnan Nair	Indian National Congress
8	Manjeri	B. Pocker	Independent
9	Mukundapuram	T. C. Narayanankutty Menon	Communist Party of India
10	Muvattupuzha	George Thomas Kottukapally	Indian National Congress
11	Palghat (SC); Two-Member Seat	Patinjara Kunhan	Communist Party of India
12	Palghat (SC); Two-Member Seat	V. Eacharan Iyyani	Indian National Congress
13	Quilon	V. Parmeswaran Nayar	Communist Party of India
14	Quilon (SC)	P. K. Kodiyan	Communist Party of India
15	Tellicherry	M. K. Jinachandran	Indian National Congress
16	Trichur	K. Krishnan Warrier	Communist Party of India
17	Thiruvalla	P. K. Vasudevan Nair	Communist Party of India
18	Trivandrum	S. Easwaran Iyer	Independent

== Madhya Pradesh ==
Keys:
INC (35) HM (1)

No.	Constituency	Member	Party
1	Balaghat	Chintaman Rao Gautam	Indian National Congress
2	Baloda Bazar	Vidya Charan Shukla	Indian National Congress
3	Baloda Bazar (SC)	Minimata Agam Dass Guru	Indian National Congress
4	Bastar (ST)	Surti Kistaiya	Indian National Congress
5	Bhopal	Maimoona Sultan	Indian National Congress
6	Bilaspur (SC)	Resham Lal Jangde	Indian National Congress
7	Chhindwara	Bhikulal Lachhimichand Chandak	Indian National Congress
8	Chhindwara (ST)	Narayanrao Maniram Wadiwa	Indian National Congress
9	Durg	Mohan Lal Baklial	Indian National Congress
10	Guna	Vijaya Raje Scindia	Indian National Congress
11	Gwalior	Radha Charan Sharma	Indian National Congress
12	Gwalior (SC)	Sooraj Prasad	Indian National Congress
13	Hoshangabad	Maganlal Radhakrishnan Bagdi	Indian National Congress
13	Hoshangabad	R. S. Kiledar	Indian National Congress
14	Indore	Kanhaiyalal Khadiwala	Indian National Congress
15	Jabalpur	Seth Govind Das	Indian National Congress
16	Janjgir	Amar Singh Sahgal	Indian National Congress
17	Jhabua (ST)	Amar Singh Damar	Indian National Congress
18	Khajuraho	Ram Sahai Tiwary	Indian National Congress
19	Khajuraho (SC)	Moti Lal Malviya	Indian National Congress
20	Mandla (ST)	Mangru Ganu Uikey	Indian National Congress
21	Mandsaur	Manakbhai Agrawal	Indian National Congress
22	Nimar	Ramsingh Bhai Varma	Indian National Congress
23	Nimar (Khandwa)	Babulal Surajbhan Tiwari	Indian National Congress
24	Raipur	Kesar Kumari Devi	Indian National Congress
25	Raipur	Major Birendra Bahadur Singh	Indian National Congress
26	Rewa	Shiv Dutt Upadhyaya	Indian National Congress
27	Sagar	Pandit Jwala Prasad Jyotishi	Indian National Congress
28	Sagar (SC)	Sahodrabai Murlidhar Rai	Indian National Congress
29	Shahdol	Anand Chandra Joshi	Indian National Congress
30	Shahdol (ST)	Kamal Narain Singh	Indian National Congress
31	Shajapur	Liladhar Joshi	Indian National Congress
32	Shajapur (SC)	Kanhaiyalal Bherulal Malvia	Indian National Congress
33	Shiv Puri	Pandit Braj Naraian Brajesh	Hindu Mahasabha
34	Surguja	Chandikeshwar Sharan Singh Ju Deo	Indian National Congress
35	Surguja (ST)	Babu Nath Singh	Indian National Congress
36	Ujjain	Radhelal Beharilal Vyas	Indian National Congress

== Madras State ==
Keys:
INC (31) DMK (2) CRC (2) CPI (2) SP (1) IND (3)

No.	Constituency	Member	Party
1	Chidambaram	R. Kanakasabai Pillai	Indian National Congress
2	Chidambaram (SC)	L. Elayaperumal	Indian National Congress
3	Chingleput	Dr. A. Krishnaswami	Independent
4	Chingleput (SC)	N. Sivaraj	Independent
5	Coimbatore	Parvathi Krishnan	Communist Party of India
6	Cuddalore	T. D. Muthukumarasamy Naidu	Congress Reforms Committee
7	Dindigul	M. Gulam Mohideen	Indian National Congress
8	Dindigul (SC)	S. C. Balkrishnan	Indian National Congress
9	Gobichettipalayam	K. S. Ramaswamy	Indian National Congress
10	Karur	K. Periaswami Gounder	Indian National Congress
11	Krishnagiri	C. R. Narasimhan	Indian National Congress
12	Kumbakonam	C. R. Pattabhi Raman	Indian National Congress
13	Madras North	S. C. C. Anthony Pillai	Socialist Party
14	Madras South	T. T. Krishnamachari	Indian National Congress
15	Madurai	K. T. K. Tangamani	Communist Party of India
16	Nagapattinam	K. R. Sambandam	Indian National Congress
17	Nagapattinam (SC)	M. Ayyakkannu	Indian National Congress
18	Namakkal	E. V. K. Sampath	Dravida Munnetra Kazhagam
19	Namakkal (SC)	S. R. Arumugham	Indian National Congress
20	Negercoil	P. Thanulingam Nadar	Indian National Congress
21	Nilgiris	C. Nanjappa	Indian National Congress
22	Perambalur	M. Palaniyandy	Indian National Congress
23	Periyakulam	R. Narayanaswami	Indian National Congress
24	Pollachi	P. R. Ramakrishnan	Indian National Congress
25	Pudukkottai	R. Ramanathan Chettiar	Indian National Congress
26	Ramanthapuram	P. Subbiah Ambalam	Indian National Congress
27	Salem	S. V. Ramaswamy	Indian National Congress
28	Srivilliputhur	U. Muthuramalingam Thevar	Independent
29	Srivilliputhur (SC)	R. S. Arumugam	Indian National Congress
30	Tanjore	R. Venkataraman	Indian National Congress
30	Tanjore	A. Servai Vairavan *	Indian National Congress
31	Tenkasi	M. Sankarapandian	Indian National Congress
32	Thiruvannamalai	R. Dharmalingam	Dravida Munnetra Kazhagam
33	Tindivanam	N. P. Shanmugha Goundar	Congress Reforms Committee
34	Tiruchendur	T. Ganapathy	Indian National Congress
35	Tiruchengode	Dr. P. Subbarayan	Indian National Congress
36	Tiruchirapalli	M. K. M. Abdul Salam	Indian National Congress
37	Tirunelveli	P. T. Thanu Pillai	Indian National Congress
38	Tiruppattur	A. Doraiswami Gounder	Indian National Congress
39	Tiruvallur	R. Govindarajulu Naidu	Indian National Congress
40	Vellore	N. R. Muni Swamy	Indian National Congress
41	Vellore (SC)	M. Muthukrishnan	Indian National Congress

== Manipur ==
Key
INC (1) SP (1)

No.	Constituency	Member	Party
1	Inner Manipur	Achaw Singh Laisram	Socialist Party
2	Outer Manipur (ST)	Rungsung Suisa	Indian National Congress

== Mysore State ==
Key
INC (23) PSP (1) SCF (1) IND (1)

No.	Constituency	Member	Party
1	Bangalore	H. C. Dasappa	Indian National Congress
2	Bangalore City	N. Keshava Iyengar	Indian National Congress
3	Belgaum	Balwantrao Nageshrao Datar	Indian National Congress
4	Bellary	Tekur Subramanyam	Indian National Congress
5	Bijapur North	Murigappa Siddappa Sugandhi	Independent
6	Bijapur South	Ramappa Balappa Bidari	Indian National Congress
7	Chikodi (SC)	Datta Appa Katti	Scheduled Castes Federation
8	Chitradurga	J. Mohamed Imam	Praja Socialist Party
9	Dharwad North	Dattatraya Parasuram Karmarkar	Indian National Congress
10	Dharwad South	Thimmappa Rudrappa Neswi	Indian National Congress
11	Gulbarga	Mahadevappa Rampure	Indian National Congress
12	Gulbarga (SC)	Shankar Deo	Indian National Congress
13	Hassan	H. Siddananjappa	Indian National Congress
14	Kanara	Joachim Alva	Indian National Congress
15	Kolar	K. Chengalaraya Reddy	Indian National Congress
16	Kolar (SC)	Dodda Thimmaiah	Indian National Congress
17	Koppal	Sangappa A. Agadi	Indian National Congress
18	Mandya	M.K. Shivananjappa	Indian National Congress
19	Mangalore	K. R. Achar	Indian National Congress
20	Mysore	M. Shankaraiya	Indian National Congress
21	Mysore (SC)	S. M. Siddiah	Indian National Congress
22	Raichur	G. S. Melkote	Indian National Congress
23	Shimoga	K. G. Wodeyar	Indian National Congress
24	Tiptur	C. R. Basappa	Indian National Congress
25	Tumkur	M. V. Krishnappa	Indian National Congress
26	Udupi	U. Srinivas Mallya	Indian National Congress

== Orissa ==
Key
INC (7) AIGP (7) PSP (2) JP (1) CPI (1) IND (2)
NOTE: Ganjam was provided a special provision to elect two MPs at a time instead of just one. There were 19 LS seats and 20 LS MPs from Orissa.

No.	Constituency	Member	Party
1	Anugul	Badakumar Pratap Gangadeb	Ganatantra Parishad
2	Balasore	Bhagabat Sahu	Indian National Congress
3	Bhadrak	Kanhu Charan Jena	Indian National Congress
4	Khordha	Dr. Nrusinha Charan Samantsinhar	Indian National Congress
5	Cuttack	Nityanand Kanungo	Indian National Congress
6	Dhenkanal	Surendra Mohanty	Ganatantra Parishad
7	Ganjam	Uma Charan Patnaik	Independent
8	Ganjam	Mohan Nayak	Indian National Congress
9	Bolangir	Pratap Keshari Deo	Ganatantra Parishad
10	Kalahandi (ST)	Bijaya Chandra Prodhan	Ganatantra Parishad
11	Kendrapara	Surendranath Dwivedy	Praja Socialist Party
12	Jagatsinghpur	Baishnab Charan Mallick	Praja Socialist Party
13	Keonjhar	Laxmi Narayan Bhanja Deo	Independent
14	Nabarangapur	Rachakonda Jagannath Rao	Indian National Congress
15	Koraput (ST)	Toyaka Sanganna	Indian National Congress
16	Mayurbhanj (ST)	Ram Chandra Majhi	Jharkhand Party
17	Puri	Chintamani Panigrahi	Communist Party of India
18	Sambalpur	Shraddhakar Supakar	Ganatantra Parishad
19	Bargarh	Banamali Kumbhar	Ganatantra Parishad
20	Sundargarh (ST)	Kalo Chandramani	Ganatantra Parishad

== Punjab ==
Key
INC (21) CPI (1)

No.	Constituency	Member	Party
1	Ambala	Subhadra Joshi	Indian National Congress
2	Ambala (SC)	Chuni Lal	Indian National Congress
3	Amritsar	Giani Gurmukh Singh Musafir	Indian National Congress
4	Bhatinda	Hukam Singh	Indian National Congress
5	Bhatinda (SC)	Ajit Singh	Indian National Congress
6	Ferozepur	Sardar Iqbal Singh	Indian National Congress
7	Gurdaspur	Diwan Chand Sharma	Indian National Congress
8	Gurgaon	Abul Kalam Azad	Indian National Congress
9	Hissar	Pandit Thakur Das Bhargava	Indian National Congress
10	Hoshiarpur	Baldev Singh	Indian National Congress
11	Jhajjar	Chaudhary Pratap Singh Daulta	Communist Party of India
12	Jullundur	Sardar Swaran Singh	Indian National Congress
13	Jullundur (SC)	Chaudhary Sadhu Ram	Indian National Congress
14	Kaithal	Mool Chand Jain	Indian National Congress
15	Kangra	Hem Raj	Indian National Congress
16	Kangra (SC)	Sardar Daljit Singh	Indian National Congress
17	Ludhiana	Ajit Singh Sarhadi	Indian National Congress
18	Ludhiana (SC)	Bahadur Singh	Indian National Congress
19	Mahendragarh	Ram Krishan Gupta	Indian National Congress
20	Patiala	Lala Achint Ram	Indian National Congress
21	Rohtak	Ranbir Singh Chaudhari	Indian National Congress
22	Taran Taran	Sardar Surjit Singh Majithia	Indian National Congress

== Rajasthan ==
Key
INC (19) IND (3)

No.	Constituency	Member	Party
1	Ajmer	Mukat Behari Lal Bhargava	Indian National Congress
2	Alwar	Shobha Ram Kumawat	Indian National Congress
3	Banswara (ST)	Bhogji	Indian National Congress
4	Barmer	Capt. Maharawal Raghunath Singh	Independent
5	Bharatpur	Raj Bahadur	Indian National Congress
6	Bhilwara	Ramesh Chandra Vyas	Indian National Congress
7	Bikaner	Karni Singh	Independent
8	Bikaner (SC)	Pannalal Barupal	Indian National Congress
9	Dausa	Gajadhar Hajarilal Somani	Indian National Congress
10	Jaipur	Harish Chandra Sharma	Independent
11	Jalore	Surajratan Fatehchand Damani	Indian National Congress
12	Jhunjhunu	Radheshyam Ramkumar Morarka	Indian National Congress
13	Jodhpur	Jaswantraj Mehta	Indian National Congress
14	Kota	Nemi Chandra Kasliwal	Indian National Congress
15	Kota (SC)	Onkar Lal Chauhan	Indian National Congress
16	Nagaur	Mathuradas Mathur	Indian National Congress
17	Pali	Harish Chandra Mathur	Indian National Congress
18	Sawai Madhopur	Hiralal Shastri	Indian National Congress
19	Sawai Madhopur (SC)	Jagannath Pahadia	Indian National Congress
20	Sikar	Rameshwar Tantia	Indian National Congress
21	Udaipur	Manikya Lal Verma	Indian National Congress
22	Udaipur (ST)	Deenbandhu Parmar	Indian National Congress

== Tripura ==
Key
INC (1) CPI (1)

No.	Constituency	Member	Party
1	Tripura East (ST)	Bangshi Thakur	Indian National Congress
2	Tripura East (ST)	Dasarath Deb	Communist Party of India

== Uttar Pradesh ==
Key
INC (70) PSP (4) ABJS (2) SP (2) CPI (1) IND (3)

No.	Constituency	Member	Party
1	Agra	Seth Achal Singh	Indian National Congress
2	Aligarh	Jamal Khwaja	Indian National Congress
3	Aligarh (SC)	Nardeo Snatak	Indian National Congress
4	Allahabad	Lal Bahadur Shastri	Indian National Congress
5	Almora	Har Govind	Indian National Congress
6	Amroha	Maulana Mohammad Hifzur Rahman	Indian National Congress
7	Azamgarh	Kalika Singh	Indian National Congress
8	Azamgarh (SC)	Vishwanath Prasad	Indian National Congress
9	Bahraich	Sardar Jogendra Singh	Indian National Congress
10	Ballia	Radha Mohan Singh	Indian National Congress
11	Balrampur	Atal Bihari Vajpayee	Akhil Bharatiya Jana Sangh
12	Banda	Raja DInesh Singh	Indian National Congress
13	Bara Banki	Ram Sewak Yadav	Praja Socialist Party
14	Bara Banki (SC)	Swami Ramanand Shastri	Indian National Congress
15	Bareilly	Satish Chandra	Indian National Congress
16	Basti	Keshav Dev Malviya	Indian National Congress
17	Basti (SC)	Ramgarib	Independent
18	Bijnor	M. Abdul Latif	Indian National Congress
19	Bilhaur	Jagdish Awasthi	Indian National Congress
20	Bisauli	Chaudhary Badan Singh	Indian National Congress
21	Budaun	Raghubir Sahai	Indian National Congress
22	Bulandshahar	Raghubar Dayal Misra	Indian National Congress
23	Bulandshahar (SC)	Kanhaiya Lal Balmiki	Indian National Congress
24	Chandauli	Tribhuvan Narain Singh	Indian National Congress
24	Chandauli	Prabhu Narain Singh *	Socialist Party
25	Dehradun	Mahavir Tyagi	Indian National Congress
26	Deoria	Ramji Verma	Praja Socialist Party
27	Domariaganj	Ram Shankar Lal	Indian National Congress
28	Etah	Rohanlal Chaturvedi	Indian National Congress
29	Etawah	Arjun Singh Bhadoria	Socialist Party
30	Etawah (SC)	Tula Ram	Indian National Congress
31	Faizabad	Raja Ram Misra	Indian National Congress
32	Faizabad (SC)	Panna Lal	Indian National Congress
33	Farrukhabad	Mulchand Dube	Indian National Congress
34	Fatehpur	Ansar Harvani	Indian National Congress
35	Firozabad (SC)	Braj Raj Singh	Socialist Party
36	Garhwal	Bhakt Darshan	Indian National Congress
37	Ghazipur	Har Prasad Singh	Indian National Congress
38	Ghosi	Umrao Singh	Indian National Congress
39	Gonda	Dinesh Pratap Singh	Indian National Congress
40	Gorakhpur	Sinhasan Singh	Indian National Congress
41	Gorakhpur (SC)	Mahadeo Prasad	Indian National Congress
42	Hamirpur	Mannoolal Dwivedi	Indian National Congress
43	Hamirpur (SC)	Chaudhary Lachchi Ram	Indian National Congress
44	Hapur	Pandit Krishan Chandra Sharma	Indian National Congress
45	Hardoi	Chheda Lal Gupta	Indian National Congress
46	Hardoi (SC)	Drohar Shivadin	Akhil Bharatiya Jana Sangh
47	Hata	Kashi Nath Pandey	Indian National Congress
48	Jalesar	Krishna Chandra	Indian National Congress
49	Jaunpur	Birbal Singh	Indian National Congress
50	Jaunpur (SC)	Ganapati Ram	Indian National Congress
51	Jhansi	Dr. Sushila Nayar	Indian National Congress
52	Kaiserganj	Bhagwandin Misra	Indian National Congress
53	Kanpur	S. M. Banerjee	Independent
54	Kheri	Kushwaqt alias Bhaiya Lal Rai	Praja Socialist Party
55	Lucknow	Pulin Behari Banerjie	Indian National Congress
56	Maharajganj	Prof. Shibbanlal Saksena	Indian National Congress
57	Mainpuri	Banshi Das Dhanagar	Praja Socialist Party
58	Mathura	Raja Mahendra Pratap	Independent
59	Meerut	Shah Nawaz Khan	Indian National Congress
60	Mirzapur	John N. Wilson	Indian National Congress
61	Mirzapur (SC)	Rup Narain	Indian National Congress
62	Moradabad	Prof. Ram Saran	Indian National Congress
63	Musafirkhana	B V Keskar	Indian National Congress
64	Muzaffarnagar	Sumat Prasad	Indian National Congress
65	Nainital	C.D. Pande	Indian National Congress
66	Phulpur	Jawaharlal Nehru	Indian National Congress
67	Phulpur (SC)	Masuriya Din	Indian National Congress
68	Pilibhit	Mohan Swarup	Praja Socialist Party
69	Pratapgarh	Pandit Munishwar Datt Upadhyay	Indian National Congress
70	Raebareli	Feroze Gandhi	Indian National Congress
71	Raebareli (SC)	Baijnath Kureel	Indian National Congress
72	Rampur	Syed Ahmad Mehdi	Indian National Congress
73	Rasra	Sarjoo Pandey	Communist Party of India
74	Saharanpur	Ajit Prasad Jain	Indian National Congress
75	Saharanpur (SC)	Sunder Lal	Indian National Congress
76	Salempur	Bishwanath Roy	Indian National Congress
77	Sardhana	Vishnu Sharan Dublish	Indian National Congress
78	Shahjahanpur	Bishan Chandra Seth	Indian National Congress
79	Shahjahanpur (SC)	Narain Din	Indian National Congress
80	Sitapur	Uma Nehru	Indian National Congress
80	Sitapur	Bhawani Prasad *	Indian National Congress
81	Sitapur (SC)	Paragi Lal	Indian National Congress
82	Sultanpur	Govind Malaviya	Indian National Congress
83	Tehri Garhwal	Lt. Col.(Retd) Manabendra Shah	Indian National Congress
84	Unnao	Vishwambhar Dayalu Tripathi	Indian National Congress
85	Unnao (SC)	Ganga Devi	Indian National Congress
86	Varanasi	Raghunath Singh	Indian National Congress

== West Bengal ==
Key
INC (23) CPI (6) PSP (2) FB(M) (2) RSP (1) LSS (1) IND (1)

No.	Constituency	Member	Party
1	Asansol	Atulya Ghosh	Indian National Congress
2	Asansol (SC)	Dr. Mono Mohan Das	Indian National Congress
3	Bankura	Dr. Ramgati Banerji	Indian National Congress
4	Bankura (SC)	Dr. Pashupati Mandal	Indian National Congress
5	Barasat	Arun Chandra Guha	Indian National Congress
6	Basirhat	Renu Chakravartty	Communist Party of India
7	Basirhat (SC)	Paresh Nath Kayal	Indian National Congress
8	Barrackpore	Bimal Comar Ghose	Praja Socialist Party
9	Berhampore	Tridib Chaudhuri	Revolutionary Socialist Party
10	Birbhum	Anil Kumar Chanda	Indian National Congress
11	Birbhum (SC)	Kamal Krishna Das	Indian National Congress
12	Burdwan	Subiman Ghose	Forward Bloc (Marxist)
13	Calcutta East	Sadhan Gupta	Communist Party of India
14	Calcutta Central	Hirendranath Mukherjee	Communist Party of India
15	Calcutta North West	Ashok Kumar Sen	Indian National Congress
16	Calcutta South West	Biren Roy	Independent
17	Contai	Pramathanath Banerjee	Praja Socialist Party
18	Cooch Behar	Santosh Kumar Banerjea	Indian National Congress
19	Cooch Behar (SC)	Upendranath Barman	Indian National Congress
20	Darjeeling	T. Manaen	Indian National Congress
21	Diamond Harbour (SC); Two-Member Seat	Kansari Halder	Communist Party of India
22	Diamond Harbour (SC); Two-Member Seat	Purnendu Sekhar Naskar	Indian National Congress
23	Ghatal	Nikunja Bihari Maiti	Indian National Congress
24	Hooghly	Prabhat Kar	Communist Party of India
25	Howrah	Mohammed Elias	Communist Party of India
26	Malda	Renuka Ray	Indian National Congress
27	Midnapur	Narasingha Malla Ugal Sanda Deb	Indian National Congress
28	Midnapur(ST)	Subodh Chandra Hansda	Indian National Congress
29	Murshidabad	Muhammed Khuda Buksh	Indian National Congress
30	Nabadwip	Ila Pal Choudhuri	Indian National Congress
31	Purulia	Bibhuti Bhushan Das Gupta	Lok Sewak Sangh
32	Serampore	Jiten Lahiri	Indian National Congress
33	Tamluk	Satish Chandra Samanta	Indian National Congress
34	Uluberia	Aurobindo Ghosal	Forward Bloc (Marxist)
35	West Dinajpur	C. K. Bhattacharyya	Indian National Congress
36	West Dinajpur (ST)	Selku Mardi	Indian National Congress

== Nominated ==
Key
INC (6)
IND (3)

No.	Constituency	Member	Party
1	Andaman and Nicobar Islands	Lachman Singh	Independent
2	North-East Frontier Agency	Chow Khamoon Gohain	Indian National Congress

=== Jammu and Kashmir ===
No.	Constituency	Member	Party
1	Baramullah	Shaikh Mohammed Akbar	Indian National Congress
2	Jammu	Inder Jit Malhotra	Indian National Congress
3	Jammu	Maulana Abdur Rahman	Indian National Congress
4	Kishtwar	Krishna Mehta	Indian National Congress
5	Srinagar	A. M. Tariq	Indian National Congress

=== Anglo-Indian reserved seats ===
No.	Member	Party
1	Frank Anthony	Independent
2	A. E. T. Barrow	Independent
