= List of members of the 1st Lok Sabha =

Members of Lok Sabha (1952-57)

Administrative regions during the Indian general election, 1951–52

The First Lok Sabha was constituted on 17 April 1952 after India's first general election. It completed its full tenure of five years and was dissolved on 4 April 1957. The year 1951 is often misleadingly associated with the election for first Lok Sabha. That is because polling for 3-4 constituencies was held in late 1951 before snow would cover that region. Polling for rest of the seats (97-98%) was conducted in December 1951 and January 1952, a few seats voted in February 1952, and Lok Sabha was constituted in April 1952. Ninety constituencies elected two members each, a practice that some constituencies followed even in 1957.

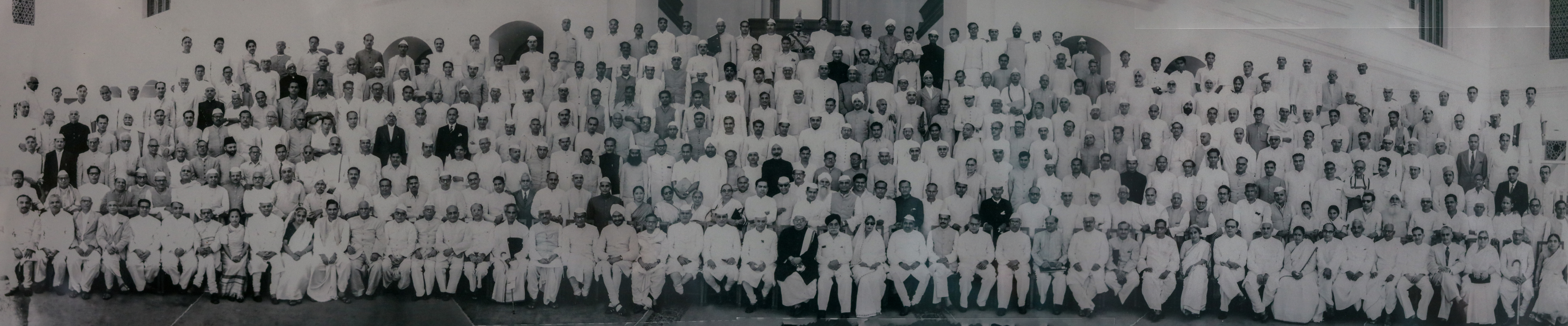
Members Of The 1st Lok Sabha, 4th Sep 1956

The official list of members, hosted on a site maintained by Government of India: India General Election Results, 1951–52

== Assam ==
Key
INC (11)
SP (1)

No.	Constituency	Member of Parliament	Party affiliation
1	Cachar Lushal Hills	Suresh Chandra Deb	Indian National Congress
2	Cachar Lushal Hills	Nibaran Chandra Laskar	Indian National Congress
3	Autonomous Districts	Bonily Khongmen	Indian National Congress
4	Goalpara Garo Hills	Amjad Ali	Socialist Party
5	Goalpara Garo Hills	Sitanath Chowdhury	Indian National Congress
6	Barpeta	Beliram Das	Indian National Congress
7	Gauhati	Rohini Kumar Chaudhuri	Indian National Congress
7	Gauhati	Debendra Nath Sharma (Bypoll 1956)	Indian National Congress
8	Darrang	Kamakhya Prasad Tripathi	Indian National Congress
9	Nowgong	D. K. Barooah	Indian National Congress
10	Golaghat Jorhat	Debeswar Sarmah	Indian National Congress
11	Sibsagar North Lakhimpur	Surendranath Buragohain	Indian National Congress
11	Sibsagar North Lakhimpur	Bimala Prasad Chaliha (Bypoll 1952)	Indian National Congress
12	Dibrugarh	Jogendra Nath Hazarika	Indian National Congress

== Ajmer ==
Key
INC (2)

No.	Constituency	Member of Parliament	Party affiliation
1	Ajmer North	Jwala Prasad	Indian National Congress
2	Ajmer South	Mukat Behari Lal Bhargava	Indian National Congress

== Bhopal ==
Key
INC (2)

No.	Constituency	Member of Parliament	Party affiliation
1	Sehore	Saeed Ullah Razmi	Indian National Congress
2	Raisen	Chatrunarayan Malviya	Indian National Congress

== Bihar ==
Key
INC (33)
JHP (3)
SP (3)
LSS (2)
CNSPJP (1)
IND (1)

No.	Constituency	Member of Parliament	Party affiliation
1	Pataliputra	Sarangdhar Singh	Indian National Congress
2	Patna Central	Kailash Pati Sinha	Indian National Congress
3	Patna East	Tarkeshwari Devi	Indian National Congress
4	Patna cum Shahabad	Balram Bhagat	Indian National Congress
5	Gaya East	Brajeshwar Prasad	Indian National Congress
6	Gaya East	Ramdhari Das	Indian National Congress
7	Gaya North	Brijeshwar Missir	Socialist Party
8	Gaya West	Satyendra Narayan Sinha	Indian National Congress
9	Shahabad South	Jagjivan Ram	Indian National Congress
10	Shahabad South	Ram Subhag Singh	Indian National Congress
11	Shahabad North West	Kamal Singh	Independent
12	Saran North	Jhulan Sinha	Indian National Congress
13	Saran Central	Mahendra Nath Singh	Indian National Congress
14	Saran East	Satya Narayan Singh	Indian National Congress
15	Saran South	Dwarkanath Tiwari	Indian National Congress
16	Saran cum Champaran	Bibhuti Mishra	Indian National Congress
17	Saran cum Champaran	Bhola Raut	Indian National Congress
18	Champaran North	Bipin Bihari Verma	Indian National Congress
19	Champaran East	Syed Mahmud	Indian National Congress
20	Muzaffarpur North West	Thakur Jugal Kishore Sinha	Indian National Congress
21	Muzaffarpur North East	Digvijay Narain Singh	Indian National Congress
22	Muzaffarpur Central	Shyam Nandan Sahay	Indian National Congress
23	Muzaffarpur East	Awadheshwar Sinha	Indian National Congress
24	Muzaffarpur cum Darbhanga	Rameshwar Sahu	Indian National Congress
25	Muzaffarpur cum Darbhanga	Rajeshwara Patel	Indian National Congress
26	Samastipur East	Satya Narayan Sinha	Indian National Congress
27	Darbhanga Central	Shree Narayan Das	Indian National Congress
28	Darbhanga East	Anirudha Sinha	Indian National Congress
29	Darbhanga North	Shyam Nandan Mishra	Indian National Congress
30	Darbhanga cum Bhagalpur	Lalit Narayan Mishra	Indian National Congress
31	Monghyr Sadar cum Jamui	Banarasi Sinha	Indian National Congress
32	Monghyr Sadar cum Jamui	Nayan Tara Das	Indian National Congress
33	Monghyr North West	Mathura Prasad Mishra	Indian National Congress
34	Monghyr North East	Suresh Chandra Mishra	Socialist Party
35	Bhagalpur cum Purnea	Anup Lal Mehta	Indian National Congress
36	Bhagalpur cum Purnea	Kirai Mushahar	Socialist Party
37	Bhagalpur Central	Banarasi Jhunjhunwala	Indian National Congress
38	Bhagalpur South	Sushama Sen	Indian National Congress
39	Purnea North East	Muhammad Islamuddin	Indian National Congress
40	Purnea Central	Phani Gopal Sen Gupta	Indian National Congress
41	Purnea cum Santal Parganas	Jughar Soren Paul	Jharkhand Party
42	Purnea cum Santal Parganas	Bhagat Jha	Indian National Congress
43	Santal Parganas cum Hazaribag	Lal Hembrom	Indian National Congress
44	Santal Parganas cum Hazaribag	Ram Raj Jajware	Indian National Congress
45	Hazaribag East	Nageshwar Sinha	Indian National Congress
46	Hazaribag West	Ram Narayan Singh	Chota Nagpur Santhal Parganas Janata Party
47	Ranchi North East	Abdul Ibrahim	Indian National Congress
48	Ranchi West	Jaipal Singh	Jharkhand Party
49	Palamau cum Hazaribag cum Ranchi	Gajendra Prasad Sinha	Indian National Congress
50	Palamau cum Hazaribag cum Ranchi	Jithan Kherwar	Indian National Congress
51	Manbhum North	Prabhat Chandra Bose	Indian National Congress
52	Manbhum North	Mohan Hari	Indian National Congress
53	Manbhum South cum Dhalbum	Bhajahari Mahato	Lok Sewak Sangh
54	Manbhum South cum Dhalbum	Chaitan Manjhi	Lok Sewak Sangh
55	Chaibasa	Kanu Ram Deogam	Jharkhand Party

== Bilaspur ==
Key
IND (1)

No.	Constituency	Member of Parliament	Party affiliation
1	Bilaspur	Anand Chand	Independent

== Bombay ==
Key
INC (40)
PWPI (1)
SCF (1)
IND (3)

No.	Constituency	Member of Parliament	Party affiliation
1	Banaskantha	Akbar Dalumiyan Chavda	Indian National Congress
2	Sabarkantha	Gulzarilal Nanda	Indian National Congress
3	Panchmahal cum Baroda East	Maneklal Gandhi	Indian National Congress
4	Panchmahal cum Baroda East	Rupajee Bhavji Parmar	Indian National Congress
5	Mehsana East	Santilal Girdharlal Parekh	Indian National Congress
6	Mehsana West	Tulsidas Kilachand	Independent
7	Ahmedabad	Muldas Bhudardas Vaishya	Indian National Congress
8	Ahmedabad	Ganesh Vasudev Mavalankar	Indian National Congress
9	Kaira North	Fulsinhji Bharatsinhji Dabhi	Indian National Congress
10	Kaira South	Maniben Patel	Indian National Congress
11	Baroda West	Indubhai Bhailalbhai Amin	Independent
12	Broach	Chandrashankar Manishankar Bhatt	Indian National Congress
13	Surat	Kanhaiyalal Nanabhai Desai	Indian National Congress
14	Surat	Bahadurbhai Kuthabhai Patel	Indian National Congress
15	Thana	Anant Savalaram Nandkar	Indian National Congress
16	Thana	Govind Dharamji Vartak	Indian National Congress
17	Ahmednagar North	Pandharinath Ramachandra Kanavade	Indian National Congress
18	Ahmednagar South	Uttamchand Ramchand Bogavat	Indian National Congress
19	Bhusawal	Shivaram Rango Rane	Indian National Congress
20	Jalgaon	Hari Vinayak Pataskar	Indian National Congress
21	West Khandesh	Shaligram Ramachandra Bharatiya	Indian National Congress
22	West Khandesh	Jayantrao Ganpat Natwadkar	Indian National Congress
23	Nasik Central	Govind Hari Deshpande	Indian National Congress
24	Poona Central	Narhar Vishnu Gadgil	Indian National Congress
25	Poona South	Indira Anant Maydeo	Indian National Congress
26	North Satara	Ganesh Sadashiv Altekar	Indian National Congress
27	Kolhapur cum Satara	Balasaheb Hasanmantrao Khardekar	Independent
28	Kolhapur cum Satara	Ratnappa Bharamappa Kumbhar	Indian National Congress
29	Sholapur	Shankar Shantaram More	Peasants and Workers Party of India
30	Sholapur	Pandurang Nathuji Rajbhoj	Scheduled Castes Federation
31	Kolaba	Chintaman Dwarkanath Deshmukh	Indian National Congress
32	South Satara	Vyankatrao Pirajirao Pawar	Indian National Congress
33	Belgaum North	Balwant Nagesh Datar	Indian National Congress
34	Belgaum South	Shankargowda Virangowda Patil	Indian National Congress
35	Ratnagiri North	Jagganathrao Krishnarao Bhosale	Indian National Congress
36	Ratnagiri South	Moreshwar Dinkar Joshi	Indian National Congress
37	Bijapur North	Rajaram Girdharlal Dube	Indian National Congress
38	Bijapur South	Ramappa Ballapa Bidari	Indian National Congress
39	Dharwar North	Dattatraya Parsuramrao Karmakar	Indian National Congress
40	Dharwar South	Timmappa Rudrappa Neswi	Indian National Congress
41	Kanara	Joachim Alwa	Indian National Congress
42	Bombay City South	Sadashiv Kanoji Patil	Indian National Congress
43	Bombay City North	Vithal Gandhi	Indian National Congress
44	Bombay City North	Narayan Sadoba Kajrolkar	Indian National Congress
45	Bombay Suburban	Jaishri Naishadh Raoji	Indian National Congress

== Coorg ==
Key
INC (1)

No.	Constituency	Member of Parliament	Party affiliation
1	Coorg	N. Somanna	Indian National Congress

== Delhi ==
Key
INC (3)
KMPP (1)

No.	Constituency	Member of Parliament	Party affiliation
1	New Delhi	Sucheta Kriplani	Kisan Mazdoor Praja Party
2	Delhi City	Radha Raman	Indian National Congress
3	Outer Delhi	C. Krishnan Nair	Indian National Congress
4	Outer Delhi	Naval Prabhakar	Indian National Congress

== Himachal Pradesh ==
Key
INC (3)

No.	Constituency	Member of Parliament	Party affiliation
1	Mandi Mahasu	Amrit Kaur	Indian National Congress
2	Mandi Mahasu	Gopi Ram	Indian National Congress
3	Chamba Sirmur	A. R. Sewal	Indian National Congress

== Hyderabad ==
Key
INC (14)
PDF (7)
PWPI (1)
SP (1)
SCF (1)
IND (1)

No.	Constituency	Member of Parliament	Party affiliation
1	Hyderabad City	Ahmed Mohiuddin	Indian National Congress
2	Ibrahimpatam	Sadat Ali Khan	Indian National Congress
3	Mahboobnagar	Janardhan Reddy	Indian National Congress
4	Mahboobnagar	P. Ramaswamy	Indian National Congress
5	Kusatgi	Shiv Murthy Swami	Independent
6	Gulbarga	Swami Ramanand Tirtha	Indian National Congress
7	Yadgir	Krishna Charya Joshi	Indian National Congress
8	Bidar	Shaukatullah Shah Ansari	Indian National Congress
9	Vikarabad	S. A. Ebenezeer	Indian National Congress
10	Osmanabad	Raghvendra Srinivas Rao	Indian National Congress
11	Bhir	Ramchander Govind Paranjpe	People's Democratic Front
12	Aurangabad	Sureshchandra Shivprasad Arya	Indian National Congress
13	Ambad	Hanmanth Rao Ganeshrao	Indian National Congress
14	Parbhani	Narayanrao Waghmare	Peasants and Workers Party of India
15	Nanded	Deo Ram Namdev Rao	Indian National Congress
16	Nanded	Shanmer Rao Srinivas Rao	Indian National Congress
17	Adilabad	C. Madhav Reddy	Socialist Party
18	Nizamabad	Harish Chandra Heda	Indian National Congress
19	Medak	N. M. Jaisoorya	People's Democratic Front
20	Karimnagar	M. R. Krishnan	Scheduled Castes Federation
21	Karimnagar	Badam Yella Reddy	People's Democratic Front
22	Warangal	Pendyal Raghava Rao	People's Democratic Front
23	Khammam	T. B. Vittal Rao	People's Democratic Front
24	Nalgonda	Ravi Narayan Reddy	People's Democratic Front
25	Nalgonda	Sunkam Achalu	People's Democratic Front

== Kutch ==
Key
INC (2)

No.	Constituency	Member of Parliament	Party affiliation
1	Kutch East	Dholakia Gulabshankar Amrutlal	Indian National Congress
2	Kutch West	Khimji Bhawanji Arjun	Indian National Congress

== Madhya Bharat ==
Key
INC (7)
ABHM (2)

No.	Constituency	Member of Parliament	Party affiliation
1	Nimar	Bajinath Mahodaya	Indian National Congress
2	Jhabua (ST)	Amar Singh	Indian National Congress
3	Indore	Nandalal Surya Narayan	Indian National Congress
4	Ujjain	Radhelal Vyas	Indian National Congress
5	Mandsaur	Kailash Nath Katju	Indian National Congress
6	Shajapur Rajgarh	Liladhar Joshi	Indian National Congress
7	Shajapur Rajgarh	Bhagu Nanda	Indian National Congress
8	Morena Bhind	Surya Prasad	Indian National Congress
9	Morena Bhind	Radha Charan	Indian National Congress
10	Guna	V. G. Deshpande	Akhil Bharatiya Hindu Mahasabha
11	Gwalior	V. G. Deshpande	Akhil Bharatiya Hindu Mahasabha
11	Gwalior	N.B. Khare (bypoll)	Akhil Bharatiya Hindu Mahasabha

== Madhya Pradesh ==
Key
INC (27)
IND (2)

No.	Constituency	Member of Parliament	Party affiliation
1	Buldana Akola	Gopalrao Bajirao Khedkar	Indian National Congress
2	Buldana Akola	Lakshman Shravan Bhatkar	Indian National Congress
3	Yeotmal	Sahadeo Arjun Bharati	Indian National Congress
4	Amravati East	Panjabrao Deshmukh	Indian National Congress
5	Amravati West	Krisnarao Gulabrao Deshmukh	Indian National Congress
6	Chanda	Mulla Abdullabhai Taherali	Indian National Congress
7	Bhandara	Tularam Chandrabhan Sakhare	Indian National Congress
8	Bhandara	Chaturbhuj Vitthaldas Jasani	Indian National Congress
9	Nagpur	Anusayabai Purushottam	Indian National Congress
10	Wardha	Shrimannarayan Dharamnarayan Aggarwal	Indian National Congress
11	Betul	Raichandbhai Shah	Indian National Congress
12	Chinddwara	Raichandbhai Shah	Indian National Congress
13	Hoshangabad	Syed Ahmad	Indian National Congress
14	Nimar	Tiwari Babulal Surajbhan	Indian National Congress
15	Sagar	Sodhia Khubchand Daryao Singh	Indian National Congress
16	Jabalpur North	Sushil Kumar	Indian National Congress
17	Mandla Jabalpur South	Mangroo	Indian National Congress
18	Mandla Jabalpur South	Govind Das Maheshwari	Indian National Congress
19	Balaghat	C. D. Gautam	Indian National Congress
20	Durg Bastar	Bhagwati Charan Shukla	Indian National Congress
21	Durg	W. S. Kirolikar	Indian National Congress
22	Mahasamund	Sheodas Daga	Indian National Congress
23	Bilaspur Durg Raipur	Bhupendranath Mishra	Indian National Congress
24	Bilaspur Durg Raipur	Agamdas	Indian National Congress
25	Bilaspur	Reshamlal	Indian National Congress
26	Bilaspur	Sardar Amarsingh Saigal	Indian National Congress
27	Surguja Raigarh	Babunath Singh	Indian National Congress
28	Surguja Raigarh	Chandikeshwar Sharan Singh	Independent
29	Bastar	Muchaki Kosa	Independent

== Madras ==
Key
INC (35)
CPI (8)
KMPP (6)
TTP (4)
CWL (3)
SP (2)
AIFB (1)
IUML (1)
IND (15)

No.	Constituency	Member of Parliament	Party affiliation
1	Pathapatnam	V. V. Giri	Indian National Congress
2	Srikakulam	Boddepalli Rajagopala Rao	Independent
3	Parvathipuram	N. Ramaseshiah	Independent
4	Vizianagaram	Kandala Subramaniam	Socialist Party
5	Vishakhapatnam	Lanka Sundaram	Independent
6	Vishakhapatnam	Gam Malludora	Independent
7	Kakinada	Chelikani Venkat Rama Rao	Communist Party of India
8	Rajahmundry	Kaneti Mohan Rao	Communist Party of India
9	Rajahmundry	Nalla Reddi Naidu	Socialist Party
10	Eluru	Kondru Subba Rao	Communist Party of India
11	Eluru	B. S. Murty	Kisan Mazdoor Praja Party
12	Masulipatnam	Sanka Butehikottaiah	Communist Party of India
13	Gudivada	K. Gopala Rao	Communist Party of India
14	Vijayavada	Harindranath Chattopadhyaya	Independent
15	Tenali	Kotha Raghuramiah	Indian National Congress
16	Guntur	S. V. Laxmi Narsimhan	Independent
17	Narasaraopet	Chapalamadugu Ramiah Chowdhary	Independent
18	Ongole	M. Nanadass	Independent
19	Ongole	P. Venkataraghaviah	Independent
20	Nellore	Bezwada Ramchandra Reddy	Independent
21	Nandyal	Rayasam Seshagiri Rao	Independent
22	Kurnool	H. Sitaram Reddy	Indian National Congress
23	Bellary	Tekur Subrahmanayam	Indian National Congress
24	Anantapur	Paidi Lakshmayya	Indian National Congress
25	Penukonda	K. S. Raghavachari	Kisan Mazdoor Praja Party
26	Cuddapah	Eswara Reddy Yellura	Communist Party of India
27	Chittoor	T. N. Viswanatha Reddy	Indian National Congress
28	Chittoor	M. V. Gangadhara Siva	Indian National Congress
29	Tirupati	M. Ananthasayanam Ayyangar	Indian National Congress
29	Madras	T. T. Krishnamachari	Indian National Congress
30	Tiruvallur	Margatham Chandrasekar	Indian National Congress
31	Tiruvallur	P. Nathesan	Indian National Congress
32	Chingleput	O. V. Alagesan	Indian National Congress
33	Kanchipuram	Dr. A. Krishnaswami	Commonweal Party
34	Vellore	Ramachandra	Commonweal Party
35	Vellore	Muthukrisnan	Indian National Congress
36	Wandiwah	Munisami	Commonweal Party
37	Krishnagiri	C. R. Narasimhan	Indian National Congress
39	Dharampuri	M. Satyanathan	Independent
40	Salem	S. V. Ramaswamy	Indian National Congress
41	Erode	Periasami Gounder	Indian National Congress
42	Erode	Balakrishnan	Indian National Congress
43	Tiruchengode	S. K. Baby/Kandaswami	Independent
44	Tiruppur	T. S. Avinashilingam Chettiar	Indian National Congress
45	Pollachi	Damodaran	Indian National Congress
46	Coimbatore	T. A. Ramalinga Chettiar	Indian National Congress
47	Pudukkottai	K. M. Vallatharsu	Kisan Mazdoor Praja Party
48	Perambalur	V. Boorarangaswami Pendyachhi	Tamil Nadu Toilers' Party
49	Tiruchirapalli	E. Mathuran	Independent
50	Tanjore	R. Venkataraman	Indian National Congress
51	Kumbakonam	C Ramaswamy Mudaliar	Indian National Congress
52	Mayuram	K Ananda Nambiar	Communist Party of India
53	Mayuram	V. Veeraswamy	Independent
54	Cuddalore	L. Elayaperumal	Indian National Congress
55	Cuddalore	N. D. Govindaswamy Kachirayar	Tamil Nadu Toilers' Party
56	Tindivanam	A. Jayaraman	Tamil Nadu Toilers' Party
57	Tindivanam	V. Muniswami	Tamil Nadu Toilers' Party
58	Tirunelvali	Pattom A. Thanu Pillai	Indian National Congress
59	Srivaikuntam	A. V. Thomas	Indian National Congress
60	Sankaranainarkoil	M. Sankarapandian	Indian National Congress
61	Aruppukottai	U. Muthuramalinga Thevar	Forward Bloc (Marxist Group)
62	Ramananthapuram	V. Nagappa Chettiar	Indian National Congress
63	Srivilliputtur	K. Kamaraj	Indian National Congress
63	Srivilliputtur	S. S .Natrajan (1955 bye election)	Indian National Congress
64	Madurai	P. M. Kakkan	Indian National Congress
65	Madurai	S. Balasubramaniam	Indian National Congress
66	Periyakulam	Saktivadivel Gounder	Indian National Congress
67	Dindigul	Ammu Swaminathan	Indian National Congress
68	South Kanara (North)	U. Srinivas Mallyya	Indian National Congress
69	South Kanara (South)	B Shiva Roy	Indian National Congress
70	Cannanore	A. K. Gopalan	Communist Party of India
71	Tellicherry	N Damodaran	Kisan Mazdoor Praja Party
72	Kozhikode	K. A. Damodara Menon	Kisan Mazdoor Praja Party
73	Malappuram	B. Pocker	Indian Union Muslim League
74	Ponnani	Kellapan Koyhapali	Kisan Mazdoor Praja Party
75	Ponnani	Vella Eacharan Iyyani	Indian National Congress

== Manipur ==
Key
INC (1)
SP (1)

No.	Constituency	Member of Parliament	Party affiliation
1	Inner Manipur	Jogeshwar Singh	Indian National Congress
2	Outer Manipur	Rishang	Socialist Party

== Mysore ==
Key
INC (10)
KMPP (1)

No.	Constituency	Member of Parliament	Party affiliation
1	Kolar	M. V. Krishnappa	Indian National Congress
2	Kolar	Dodda Thimmaiah	Indian National Congress
3	Tumkur	C. R. Basappa	Indian National Congress
4	Bangalore North	N. Keshaveingar	Indian National Congress
5	Bangalore South	T. Madiah Gowda	Indian National Congress
6	Mandya	M. K. Shivananjappa	Indian National Congress
7	Hassan Chikmagalur	H. Siddananjappa	Indian National Congress
8	Shimoga	K. G. Wodeyar	Indian National Congress
9	Chitradurga	S. Nijalingappa	Indian National Congress
10	Mysore	N. Rachiah	Indian National Congress
11	Mysore	M. S. Gurupadaswamy	Kisan Mazdoor Praja Party

== Orissa ==
Key
INC (11)
AIGP (6)
CPI (1)
SP (1)
IND (1)

No.	Constituency	Member of Parliament	Party affiliation
1	Nowrangpur	Ponnada Subbarao	Ganatantra Parishad
2	Raigarh Phulbani (ST)	T. Sanganna	Indian National Congress
3	Kalahandi Bolangir	Girdhari Bhoi	Ganatantra Parishad
4	Kalahandi Bolangir	Rajendra Narayan Singh Deo	Ganatantra Parishad
5	Bargarh	Brajmohan Pradhan	Ganatantra Parishad
6	Sambalpur	Natabar Pandey	Ganatantra Parishad
7	Sundargarh (ST)	Sibnarayan Singh	Indian National Congress
8	Dhenkanal West Cuttack	Niranjan Jena	Indian National Congress
9	Dhenkanal West Cuttack	Sarangadhar Das	Socialist Party
10	Jajpur Keonjhar	Bhubananda Das	Indian National Congress
11	Jajpur Keonjhar	Laxmidhar Jena	Ganatantra Parishad
12	Mayurbhanj (ST)	Ramchandra Manjhi	Indian National Congress
13	Balasore	Kanhu Charan Jena	Indian National Congress
14	Balasore	Bhagabat Sahu	Indian National Congress
15	Kendrapara	Nityanand Kanungo	Indian National Congress
16	Cuttack	Harekrushna Mahtab	Indian National Congress
17	Puri	Loknath Mishra	Indian National Congress
18	Khurda	Lingaraj Mishra	Indian National Congress
19	Ghumsur	Umachand Patnaik	Independent
20	Ganjam South	Bijoy Chandra Das	Communist Party of India

== Patiala and East Punjab States Union ==
Key
INC (2)
SAD (1)
IND (1)

No.	Constituency	Member of Parliament	Party affiliation
1	Mohindergarh	Hira Singh	Indian National Congress
2	Patiala	Ram Pratap	Indian National Congress
3	Kapurthala Bhatinda	Hukam Singh	Shiromani Akali Dal
4	Kapurthala Bhatinda	Ajit Singh	Shiromani Akali Dal
5	Sangrur	Ranjit Singh	Independent

== Punjab ==
Key
INC (13)
SAD (2)

No.	Constituency	Member of Parliament	Party affiliation
1	Ambala Simla	Tek Chand	Indian National Congress
2	Karnal	Virendra Kumar	Indian National Congress
3	Karnal	Subhadra Joshi	Indian National Congress
4	Rohtak	Ranbir Singh	Indian National Congress
5	Jhajjar Rewari	Ghamandi Lal	Indian National Congress
6	Gurgaon	Thakkar Das	Indian National Congress
7	Hissar	Achint Lal	Indian National Congress
8	Fazila Sirsa	Atma Singh	Indian National Congress
9	Nawan Shar	Baldev Singh	Indian National Congress
10	Kangra	Hem Raj	Indian National Congress
11	Jullundur	Amar Nath	Indian National Congress
12	Gurdaspur	Teja Singh	Indian National Congress
13	Tarn Taran	Surjit Singh Majithia	Indian National Congress
14	Amritsar	Gurmit Singh Musaffar	Indian National Congress
15	Hoshiarpur	Ram Das	Indian National Congress
16	Hoshiarpur	Diwan Chand	Indian National Congress
17	Ferozepore Ludhiana	Lal Singh	Shiromani Akali Dal
18	Ferozepore Ludhiana	Bahadur Singh	Shiromani Akali Dal

== Rajasthan ==
Key
INC (9)
RRP (3)
ABJS (1)
KLP (1)
IND (6)

No.	Constituency	Member of Parliament	Party affiliation
1	Jaipur Sawaimadhopur	Ram Karan Joshi	Indian National Congress
2	Bharatpur Sawaimadhopur	Girraj Sharan Singh	Independent
3	Bharatpur Sawaimadhopur	Manak Chand	Krishikar Lok Party
4	Alwar	Shobha Ram Kumawat	Indian National Congress
5	Ganganagar Jhunjunu	Murarka Radhey Shyam	Indian National Congress
6	Ganganagar Jhunjunu	Panna Lal	Indian National Congress
7	Bikaner Churu	Karni Singh	Independent
8	Jodhpur	Hanwant Singh	Independent
9	Balmer Jalore	Bhawani Singh	Independent
10	Sirohi Pali	Ajit Singh	Independent
11	Nagaur Pali	Gajadhar	Independent
12	Sikar	Nand Lal	Akhil Bharatiya Ram Rajya Parishad
13	Jaipur	Daulat Mal	Indian National Congress
14	Tonk	Pannalal Kaushik	Indian National Congress
15	Bhilwara	Hari Ram	Akhil Bharatiya Ram Rajya Parishad
16	Udaipur	Balwant Singh Mehta	Indian National Congress
17	Banswara Dungarpur	Bhika Bhai	Indian National Congress
18	Chittor	Umashankar	Bharatiya Jana Sangh
19	Kotah Bundi	Chandra Sen	Akhil Bharatiya Ram Rajya Parishad
20	Kotah Jhalawar	Nemichand Kasilwal	Indian National Congress

== Saurashtra ==
Key
INC (6)

No.	Constituency	Member of Parliament	Party affiliation
1	Halar	M. S. Himmatsinghji	Indian National Congress
2	Madhya Saurashtra	Joshi Jethalal Harikrishna	Indian National Congress
3	Zalawad	Parikh Rasiklal Umedchand	Indian National Congress
4	Gohilwad	Balwantrai Mehta	Indian National Congress
5	Gohilwad Sorath	Shah Chimanlal Chakubhai	Indian National Congress
6	Sorath	Nathiwani Narendra	Indian National Congress

== Travancore Cochin ==
Key
INC (6)
CPI (1)
TTNC (1)
RSP (1)
IND (3)

No.	Constituency	Member of Parliament	Party affiliation
1	Nagercoil	A. Nesamony	Travancore Tamil Nadu Congress
2	Trivandrum	Annie Mascarene	Independent
3	Trichur	Iyyunni Chalakka	Indian National Congress
4	Cangannur	K.T. Achuthan	Indian National Congress
5	Ernakulam	A.M. Thomas	Indian National Congress
6	Kottayam	Prof. C.P. Mathew	Indian National Congress
7	Meenachil	P. T. Chacko	Indian National Congress
8	Thiruvalla	C. P. Matthen	Indian National Congress
9	Alappuzha	P.T. Punnoose	Communist Party of India
10	Chirayinkil	V. Parameswaran Nayar	Independent
11	Quilon cum Mavelikara	N. Sreekantan Nair	Revolutionary Socialist Party
12	Quilon cum Mavelikara	R. Velayudhan	Independent

== Tripura ==
Key
CPI (2)

No.	Constituency	Member of Parliament	Party affiliation
1	Tripura East	Dasarath Deb	Communist Party of India
2	Tripura West	Birendra Chandra Dutta	Communist Party of India

== Uttar Pradesh ==
Key
INC (80)
ABHM (2)
SP (2)
IND (2)

No.	Constituency	Member of Parliament	Party affiliation
1	Amroha	Maulana Hifzur Rahman Seoharwi	Indian National Congress
2	Dehra Dun District cum Bijnor District (North West); Cum Saharanpur District (West)	Mahavir Tyagi	Indian National Congress
3	Garhwal District (West) cum Tehri Garhwal District cum Bijnor District (North)	Kamalendumati Shah	Independent
4	Garhwal District (East) cum Moradabad District (North East)	Bhaktadarshan	Indian National Congress
5	Almora District (North East)	Devi Datt	Indian National Congress
6	Naini Tal District cum Almora District (South West) cum Bareilly District (North)	C. D. Pande	Indian National Congress
7	Bareilly District (South)	Satish Chandra	Indian National Congress
8	Pilibhit District cum Bareilly District (East)	Mukund Lal Agarwal	Indian National Congress
9	Moradabad District (West)	Ram Saran	Indian National Congress
10	Moradabad District (Central)	Hifzul Rehman	Indian National Congress
11	Rampur District cum Bareilly District (West)	Abul Kalam Azad	Indian National Congress
12	Bijnor District (South)	Nemi Saran	Indian National Congress
13	Saharanpur District (West) cum Muzaffarnagar District (North)	Sunder Lal	Indian National Congress
14	Saharanpur District (West) cum Muzaffarnagar District (North)	Ajit Prasad Jain	Indian National Congress
15	Muzaffarnagar District (South)	Tripathi Hira Ballabh	Indian National Congress
16	Meerut District (West)	Khushi Ram Sharma	Indian National Congress
17	Meerut District (South)	Krishna Chandra Sharma	Indian National Congress
18	Meerut District (North East)	Shah Nawaz Khan	Indian National Congress
19	Bulandshahr District	Raghubar Dayal	Indian National Congress
20	Bulandshahr District	Balmiki Kanhaiya Lal	Indian National Congress
21	Aligarh District	Nardeo Ji	Indian National Congress
22	Aligarh District	Shri Chand Singhal	Indian National Congress
23	Agra District (West)	Achal Singh Seth	Indian National Congress
24	Agra District (East)	Raghubir Singh	Indian National Congress
25	Mathura District (West)	Krishna Chandra	Indian National Congress
26	Etah District (West) cum Mainpuri District (West) cum Mathura District (East)	Digamber Singh	Indian National Congress
27	Etah District (Central)	Rohanlal Chaturvedi	Indian National Congress
28	Etah District North East cum Baduan District (East)	Raghubir Sahai	Indian National Congress
29	Badaun District (West)	Badan Sing	Indian National Congress
30	Farrukhabad District (North)	Mulchand Dube	Indian National Congress
31	Mainpuri District (East)	Badshah Gupta	Indian National Congress
31	Jalaun District cum Etawah District (West) cum Jhansi District (North)	Lotan Ram	Indian National Congress
32	Jalaun District cum Etawah District (West) cum Jhansi District (North)	Hoti Lal Agarwal	Indian National Congress
33	Kanpur District North cum Farrukhabad District South	V. N. Tiwari	Indian National Congress
34	Kanpur District Central	Harihar Nath Shastri	Indian National Congress
35	Kanpur District South cum Etawah District	Bal Krishna Sharma	Indian National Congress
36	Jhansi District (South)	Dhulekar Raghunath	Indian National Congress
37	Hamirpur District	Mannu Lal Duvedi	Indian National Congress
38	Banda District cum Fatehpur District	Pyare Lal Kureel	Indian National Congress
39	Banda District cum Fatehpur District	Shive Dayal	Indian National Congress
40	Unnao District cum Rae Bareli District (West) cum Hardoi District (South East)	Vishambhar Dayal	Indian National Congress
41	Unnao District cum Rae Bareli District (West) cum Hardoi District (South East)	Swami Ramanand	Indian National Congress
42	Hardoi District (North West) cum Farukkhabad District (East) cum Shahjahanpur District (South)	Bulaqi Ram	Indian National Congress
43	Hardoi District (North West) cum Farukkhabad District (East) cum Shahjahanpur District (South)	Bashir Hussain Zaidi	Indian National Congress
44	Shajahanpur District (North) cum Kheri District (East)	Rameshwar Prasad Nevatia	Indian National Congress
45	Shajahanpur District (North) cum Kheri District (East)	Ganeshi Lal Chowdhary	Indian National Congress
46	Sitapur District cum Kheri District (West)	Uma Nehru	Indian National Congress
47	Sitapur District cum Kheri District (West)	Paragi Lal	Indian National Congress
48	Lucknow District cum Bara Banki District	Mohan Lal Saxena	Indian National Congress
49	Lucknow District cum Bara Banki District	Ganga Devi	Indian National Congress
50	Lucknow District Central	Vijaya Lakshmi Pandit	Indian National Congress
51	Pratapgarh District (West) cum Rae Bareli District (East)	Baij Nath Kureel	Indian National Congress
52	Pratapgarh District (West) cum Rae Bareli District (East)	Feroze Gandhi	Indian National Congress
53	Pratapgarh District (East)	Munishwer Dutt Upadhyaya	Indian National Congress
54	Sultanpur District (South)	B. V. Keskar	Indian National Congress
55	Sultanpur District (North) cum Faizabad District (South West)	M. A. Kazmi	Indian National Congress
56	Faizabad District (North West)	Panna Lal	Indian National Congress
57	Faizabad District (North West)	Lallan Ji	Indian National Congress
58	Jaunpur District (East)	Ganpat	Indian National Congress
59	Jaunpur District (East)	Birbal Singh	Indian National Congress
60	Allahabad District (East) cum Jaunpur District (West)	Masuriya Din	Indian National Congress
61	Allahabad District (East) cum Jaunpur District (West)	Jawahar Lal Nehru	Indian National Congress
62	Allahabad District (West)	Sri Prakasha	Indian National Congress
63	Mirzapur District cum Banaras District (West)	Rup Narain	Indian National Congress
64	Mirzapur District cum Banaras District (West)	J. N. Wilson	Indian National Congress
65	Banaras District (Central)	Raghunath Singh	Indian National Congress
66	Banaras District (East)	Tribhuvan Narain Singh	Indian National Congress
67	Bahraich District (East)	Rafi Ahmad Kidwai	Indian National Congress
68	Bahraich District (West)	Jogendra Singh	Indian National Congress
69	Gonda District (North)	Chowdhari Hyder Husain	Indian National Congress
70	Gonda District (West)	Nayar Shakuntala	Akhil Bharatiya Hindu Mahasabha
71	Gonda District (East) cum Basti District (West)	Kesho Deo Malviya	Indian National Congress
72	Basti District (North)	Udai Shankar Dubey	Indian National Congress
73	Basti District Central (East) cum Gorakhpur District (West)	Sohan Lal Dhusiya	Indian National Congress
74	Basti District Central (East) cum Gorakhpur District (West)	Ram Shankar Lal	Indian National Congress
75	Gorakhpur District (North)	Hari Shanker Prasad	Indian National Congress
76	Gorakhpur District (Central)	Dashrath Prasad Divedi	Indian National Congress
77	Gorakhpur District (South)	Sinhasan Singh	Indian National Congress
78	Deoria District (South)	Sarayu	Indian National Congress
79	Deoria District (West)	Bishwa Nath	Indian National Congress
80	Deoria District (East)	Ram Ji	Socialist Party
81	Azamgarh District (West)	Sita Ram	Indian National Congress
82	Azamgarh District (West)	Vishwa Nath	Indian National Congress
83	Azamgarh District (East) cum Ballia District (West)	Algu Rai Shastri	Indian National Congress
84	Ghazipur District (West)	Har Prasad	Indian National Congress
85	Ghazipur District (East) cum Ballia District South (West)	Ram Nagina	Socialist Party
86	Ballia District (East)	Murli Manohar	Independent

== Vindhya Pradesh ==
Key
INC (4)
KMPP (1)
SP (1)

No.	Constituency	Member of Parliament	Party affiliation
1	Shadol Sidhi	Randaman Singh	Kisan Mazdoor Praja Party
2	Shadol Sidhi	Bhagwan Dutt Shastri	Socialist Party
3	Rewa	Rajbhan Singh Tiwari	Indian National Congress
4	Satna	Upadhiya S. D.	Indian National Congress
5	Chattarpur Datiya Titamgarh	Moti Lal Malvi	Indian National Congress
6	Chattarpur Datiya Titamgarh	Ram Sahai Tiwari	Indian National Congress

== West Bengal ==
Key
INC (23)
CPI (5)
ABJS (2)
RSP (2)
ABHM (1)

No.	Constituency	Member of Parliament	Party affiliation
1	North Bengal	Upendra Nath Barman	Indian National Congress
2	North Bengal	Birendra Nath Kathman	Indian National Congress
3	North Bengal	Amiya Kanta Basu	Indian National Congress
4	West Dinajpur	Susil Ranjan Chattopadhyay	Indian National Congress
5	Malda	Surendra Mohan Ghosh	Indian National Congress
6	Birbhum	Anil Kumar Chanda	Indian National Congress
7	Birbhum	Kamal Krishna Das	Indian National Congress
8	Murshidabad	Muhammed Khuda Bukhsh	Indian National Congress
9	Berhampore	Tridib Chaudhuri	Revolutionary Socialist Party
10	Bankura	Jaggannath Koley	Indian National Congress
11	Bankura	Pashupati Mandal	Indian National Congress
12	Midnapur Jhargram	Durga Charan Banerjee	Bharatiya Jana Sangh
13	Midnapur Jhargram	Tudu Bharat Lal	Indian National Congress
14	Ghatal	Chowdhary Nikunj Bihari	Communist Party of India
15	Tamluk	Satish Chandra Samanta	Indian National Congress
16	Contai	Basanta Kumar Das	Indian National Congress
17	Uluberia	Satyaban Roy	Indian National Congress
18	Howrah	Santosh Kumar Dutta	Indian National Congress
19	Serampore	Tushar Kanti Chattopadhyaya	Communist Party of India
20	Hooghly	Nirmal Chandra Chatterjee	Akhil Bharatiya Hindu Mahasabha
21	Burdwan	Mono Mohan Das	Indian National Congress
22	Burdwan	Atulya Ghosh	Indian National Congress
23	Kalna Katwa	Janab Abdus Sattar	Indian National Congress
24	Nabadwip	Lakshmi Kanta Maitra	Indian National Congress
25	Santipur	Arun Chandra Guha	Indian National Congress
26	Basirhat	Chakravartty Renu	Communist Party of India
27	Basirhat	Roy Patiram	Indian National Congress
28	Barrackpore	Das Ramananda	Indian National Congress
29	Diamond Harbour	Basu Kamal	Communist Party of India
30	Diamond Harbour	Naskar Purnendu Sekhar	Indian National Congress
31	Calcutta South West	Ashim Krishna Dutt	Indian National Congress
32	Calcutta South East	Shyama Prasad Mookerjee	Bharatiya Jana Sangh
33	Calcutta North East	Hirendra Nath Mukherjee	Communist Party of India
34	Calcutta North West	Meghnad Saha	Revolutionary Socialist Party

== Nominated Candidates ==
Key
INC (1)
IND (3)

No.	Constituency	Member of Parliament	Party affiliation
1	Andaman and Nicobar Islands	Rt. Rev. John Richardson	Independent
2	North-East Frontier Agency	Chow Khamoon Gohain	Indian National Congress
3	Anglo Indian	Frank Anthony	Independent
4	Anglo Indian	A. E. T. Barrow	Independent
