= Sisir Kumar =

Sisir Kumar may refer to

- Sisir Kumar Das, Indian scholar
- Sisir Kumar Ghosh, Indian journalist
- Sisir Kumar Maitra, Indian academic
- Sisir Kumar Mitra, Indian physicist
- Sisir Kumar Saha, Indian politician
