= Ajay Maken =

Indian politician (born 1964)

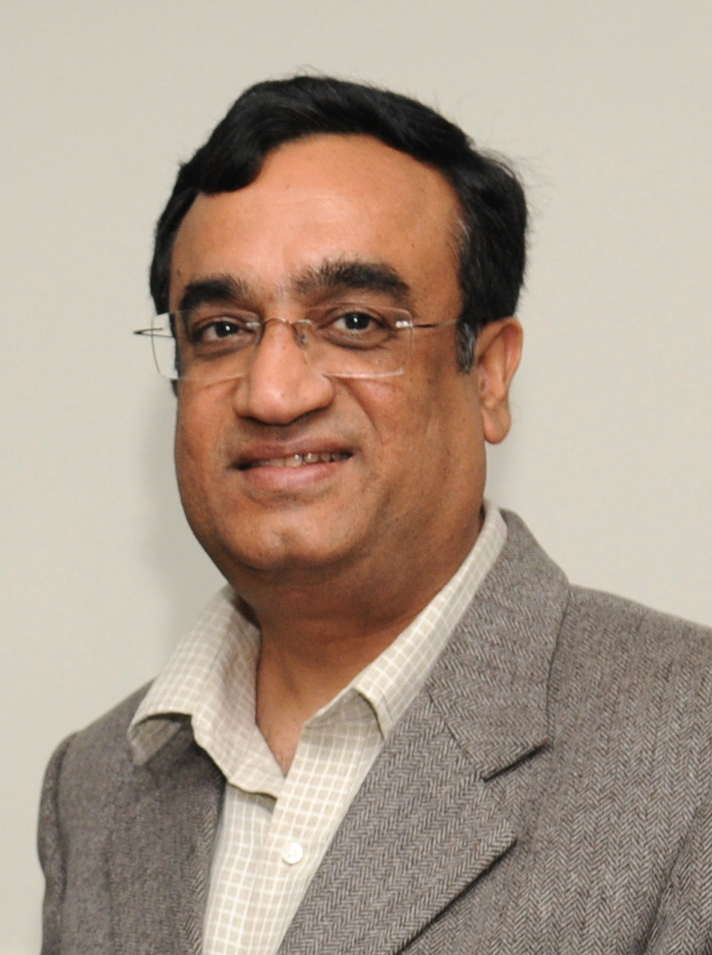

Treasurer of the Indian National Congress
- Incumbent
- Assumed office 1 October 2023
- Preceded by: Pawan Kumar Bansal

Member of Parliament, Rajya Sabha
- Incumbent
- Assumed office 4 April 2024
- Preceded by: L. Hanumanthaiah
- Constituency: Karnataka

Union Minister of Housing and Urban Poverty Alleviation
- In office 28 October 2012 – 15 June 2013
- Prime Minister: Manmohan Singh
- Preceded by: Selja Kumari
- Succeeded by: Girija Vyas

Union Minister of State (Independent Charge) for Youth Affairs and Sports
- In office 19 January 2011 – 28 October 2012
- Prime Minister: Manmohan Singh
- Preceded by: M. S. Gill
- Succeeded by: Jitendra Singh

Union Minister of State for Home Affairs
- In office 28 May 2009 – 19 January 2011 Serving with Mullappally Ramachandran
- Prime Minister: Manmohan Singh
- Minister: P. Chidambaram
- Preceded by: Shakeel Ahmad
- Succeeded by: Gurudas Kamat

Union Minister of State for Urban Development
- In office 29 January 2006 – 22 May 2009
- Prime Minister: Manmohan Singh
- Minister: S. Jaipal Reddy
- Succeeded by: Saugata Roy

Member of Parliament, Lok Sabha
- In office 13 May 2004 – 16 May 2014
- Preceded by: Jagmohan
- Succeeded by: Meenakshi Lekhi
- Constituency: New Delhi

Speaker of the Delhi Legislative Assembly
- In office 17 December 2003 – 28 May 2004
- Preceded by: Subhash Chopra
- Succeeded by: Chaudhary Prem Singh

Member, Delhi Legislative Assembly
- In office 1993–2004
- Preceded by: Constituency established
- Succeeded by: Ramesh Lamba
- Constituency: Rajouri Garden

Personal details
- Born: 12 January 1964 (age 62) New Delhi, India
- Party: Indian National Congress
- Spouse: Radhika Maken
- Children: 3
- Education: University of Delhi
- As of 16 September, 2006

Ajay Maken (born 12 January 1964) is a politician from the Indian National Congress party. He is the treasurer of the All India Congress Committee (AICC) and member of the Congress Working Committee (CWC). A three-time member of the Parliament of India and three-time MLA, Delhi Legislative Assembly, he was formerly a minister in the cabinet of Prime Minister Manmohan Singh and a minister in the cabinet of Delhi Chief Minister Sheila Dikshit.

He has been thrice elected as a member of the Parliament of India, and three times to the Delhi Legislative Assembly. He was the president of Delhi Pradesh Congress Committee.

Ajay Maken was appointed a member of Empowered Action Group of Leaders and Experts (EAGLE) which was constituted by Indian National Congress on 2 February 2025 to monitor the conduct of free and fair elections by the Election Commission of India.

== Political career ==
Maken had been a two-time Member of Parliament of India (Lok Sabha from 2004 to 2014) and was elected for the third time as Member Parliament of India Rajya Sabha in February 2024, in addition to being a three-time Member of Legislative Assembly of Delhi (from 1993 to 2004).

At the National level, Maken was the youngest Union Cabinet Minister from the Congress Party for Housing and Urban Poverty Alleviation (2012–13), Union Minister of State (Independent Charge) for Sports and Youth Affairs (2011–12), Union Minister of State for Home Affairs (2009–2011), Union Minister of State for Urban Development (2006–2007).

At the State level, he was Speaker of Delhi Legislative Assembly (2003–04) at the age of 39, Maken was the youngest Speaker in the Country, a Cabinet Minister of Power, Transport and Tourism (2001-2003) at the age of 37, the youngest until that time and parliamentary secretary to the chief minister Sheila Dikshit (1998-2001).

Maken was the first NSUI candidate in a direct election to be elected as the president of Delhi University Students Union (DUSU) in 1985, the first B.Sc. Chemistry (Hons.) final year student in this post.

== Lok Sabha ==
In the 2004 general election, Maken represented the Congress for the New Delhi constituency. He defeated a sitting Cabinet Minister, Jagmohan, from the Bharatiya Janata Party.

In the 2009 general elections, he retained the New Delhi Parliamentary constituency. He was appointed the minister of state for home affairs.

In 2011, Maken was appointed the minister for sports and youth affairs after the 2010 Commonwealth Games scam, replacing M. S. Gill as Sports Minister.

He was appointed minister for housing and urban poverty alleviation (I/C) in 2012.

Maken was defeated in the 2014 general elections by the BJP candidate Meenakshi Lekhi. He served as the Congress general secretary until 2015, when he resigned after the party's failure to win any seat in the 2015 Delhi Legislative Assembly election.

== Personal life ==
Ajay Maken is married and has three children. He received his education in St. Xavier's School, Delhi. Maken completed his BSc degree in chemistry at Hansraj College, Delhi University. Lalit Maken, Ajay Maken's uncle was elected to Lok Sabha in 1984 but was assassinated in 1985 for his alleged role in the massacre of Sikhs in Delhi in November 1984.
