= Abdul Ibrahim =

Abdul Ibrahim may refer to:

- Abdul Ibrahim (footballer)
- Abdul Ibrahim (politician)
- Abdus Ibrahim, former name of Ethiopian footballer Fuad Ibrahim
