= Kesariya =

Kesariya may refer to:

- Kesaria or Kesariya, town in East Champaran district, Bihar, India
- Kesariya Lok Sabha constituency, parliamentary constituency until 1977 in Bihar
- "Kesariya" (song), from the 2022 Indian film Brahmāstra: Part One – Shiva

== See also ==
- Kesariyaji Tirth or Rishabhdeo Jain temple in Rajasthan, India
- "Kesariya Balam", folk song from Rajasthan
- Caesarea (disambiguation)
