= Amjad Ali (Assam politician) =

Indian politician

Amjad Ali MP

Member of Parliament, 2nd Lok Sabha
- In office 1957–1962
- Constituency: Dhubri

Member of Parliament, 1st Lok Sabha
- In office 1952–1957
- Constituency: Dhubri

Member of Assam Legislative Assembly
- In office 1937–1945
- Constituency: Goalpara East

Personal details
- Born: Mohammad Amjad Ali; 26 September 1903 Goalpara, Assam Province British India (now Assam, India)
- Party: Praja Socialist Party
- Spouse: Nurjehan Begum
- Children: 6
- Parent: Amiruddin Ahmed (father)
- Education: BSc; LL.B.
- Alma mater: Cotton College (now Cotton University); Aligarh Muslim University

Mohammad Amjad Ali (born 26 September 1903, date of death unknown), commonly known as Amjad Ali, was an Indian politician and lawyer of the Supreme Court of India who served parliament member twice collectively from 1952 to 1962, and represented Dhubri constituency after he was elected in the first and second general elections. He was affiliated with the Praja Socialist Party.

== Biography ==
He was born on 26 September 1903 in Goalpara, Assam Province of British India (now Assam, India) to Maulvi Amiruddin Ahmed. He did his early schooling from Dhubri Zilla School, and later attended Cotton College (now Cotton University) and Aligarh Muslim University. He served president of Goalpara District Students Conference for Abhayapuri in 1938, and later in 1939 president of Muslim Students Federation for Kamrup District until he was appointed president of All India Muslim Students Federation for Sylhet in 1944.

Amjad also served vice-president of Assam Provincial Muslim League (formerly member of the Socialist Party) from 1939 to 1941, and later member of Dacca University Court from 1939 to 1945 for Faculty of Arts and Law, member of University of Calcutta from 1943 to 1948. He later served in the Partially Excluded Areas Conference in 1940 and subsequently served at the member of the editorial board of the Daily English Man and Aligarh Daily Mail. Prior to serving parliament member, he served member of Assam Legislative Assembly from 1937 to 1945.

As a writer, he wrote about Louis XIV and was awarded Ibn Khaldun Gold Medal for his publication.

== Personal life ==
He married Nurjehan Begum in November 1923, with whom he had three daughters and three sons.
