= Delhi Pradesh Congress Committee =

- President: Devender Yadav (interim)
- Headquarters: Rajiv Bhawan, 2, DDU Marg New Delhi-110002
- Youth wing: Delhi Pradesh Youth Congress
- Women's wing: Delhi Pradesh Mahila Congress
- Ideology: Liberalism; Secularism; Humanism; Progressivism
- ECI Status: An Union Territorial Unit of Indian National Congress
- Alliance: Indian National Developmental Inclusive Alliance
- Seats in Rajya Sabha: 0 / 3
- Seats in Lok Sabha: 0 / 7
- Seats in Delhi Legislative Assembly: 0 / 70

Election symbol

Website
- INC Delhi

Delhi Pradesh Congress Committee (DPCC) is the Pradesh Congress Committee (state wing) of the Indian National Congress (INC) serving in the union territory of Delhi. It is responsible for organizing and coordinating the party's activities and campaigns within the region, as well as selecting candidates for local, state, and national elections in National Capital Territory of Delhi. Abhishek Dutt, Mudit Agarwal, Shivani Chopra, Ali Mehdi and Jaikishan are the Vice Presidents of Delhi Pradesh Congress Committee.

Mohd Hedayatullah (Gentle) is the Chairman of Social Media Department, Delhi Pradesh Congress Committee. Sandeep Goswami is the Treasurer and Parvez Alam heads the Media Department. Amit Malik is a former General Secretary of DPCC and former President of Delhi Pradesh Youth Congress.

== Structure and composition ==
#	Name of the Organisation	Name of the President	Name of the Vice President
01	Youth Congress	Rannvijay Singh Lochav	NIL
03	Delhi Mahila Congress	Pushpa Singh	NIL
04	NSUI	Kunal Sehrawat	Deepanshu Sagar
05	Seva Dal	Sunil Kumar	NIL
06	Delhi Pradesh Congress Social Media	Rahul Sharma	
07.	INTUC		NIL
08	Kisan and Khet Mazdoor Congress	Rajbir Solanki	NIL
09	Rajiv Gandhi Panchayati Raj Sangathan	Tarun Tyagi	NIL

== List of presidents ==
No.	Name of the President	Term			
No.	Name of the President	1	Aruna Asaf Ali	1946	1948
2	Radha Raman	1948	1951		
3	Chaudhary Brahm Prakash	1951	1953		
4	C K Nayyar	1953	1955		
5		1957	1959		
6		1959	1961		
7	Brij Mohan	1961	1963		
8	Mir Mushtaq Ahmad	1963	1966		
(3)	Chaudhary Brahm Prakash	1966	1967		
9	Rajesh Sharma	1967	1969		
(2)	Radha Raman	1969	1972		
10	Ch Dalip Singh Panwar	1972	1975		
11	Amarnath Chawla	1975	1977		
12	Ch Mange Ram Jatrana	1977	1978		
(10)	H. K. L. Bhagat	1978	1983		
13	Tajdar Babar	1984	1988		
14	Prem Singh	1988	1992		
(10)	H. K. L. Bhagat	1992	1994		
15	Ch Deep Chand Bandhu Tewatiya	1994	1997		
(14)	Prem Singh	1997	1998		
16	Sheila Dikshit	1998	1999		
17	Subhash Chopra	1999	2003		
(14)	Prem Singh	11 June 2003	2004		
18	Ram Babu Sharma	November 2004	2007		
19	Jai Prakash Agarwal	13 September 2007	16 December 2013		
20	Arvinder Singh Lovely	20 December 2013	10 February 2015		
21	Ajay Maken	2 March 2015	5 January 2019		
(16)	Sheila Dikshit	11 January 2019	20 July 2019		
(17)	Subhash Chopra	23 October 2019	12 February 2020		
22	Anil Chaudhary	11 March 2020	31 August 2023		
(20)	Arvinder Singh Lovely	31 August 2023	28 April 2024		
23	Devender Yadav	29 April 2024	Incumbent		

== List of the chief ministers of Delhi from the Indian National Congress ==
Following is the list of the chief ministers of Delhi from Indian National Congress:

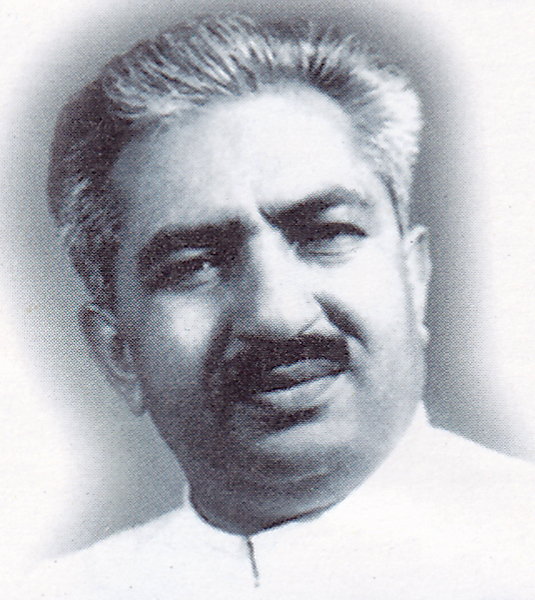
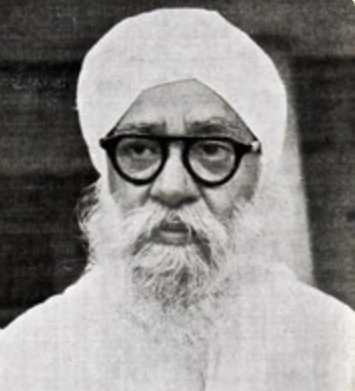
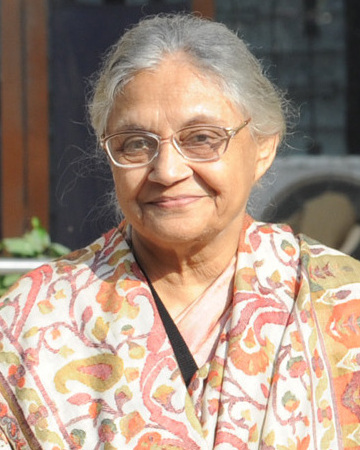
No.	Chief ministers	Portrait	Term in office			Assembly	Constituency
No.	Chief ministers	Portrait	Start	End	Tenure	Assembly	Constituency
1	Chaudhary Brahm Prakash		17 March 1952	12 February 1955	2 years, 332 days	Interim Assembly	Nangloi Jat
2	Gurmukh Nihal Singh		13 February 1955	31 October 1956	1 year, 261 days	Interim Assembly	Daryaganj
3	Sheila Dikshit		4 December 1998	1 December 2003	15 years, 22 days	2nd Assembly	Gole Market
3	Sheila Dikshit		2 December 2003	29 November 2008	15 years, 22 days	3rd Assembly	Gole Market
3	Sheila Dikshit		30 November 2008	27 December 2013	15 years, 22 days	4th Assembly	New Delhi

== Electoral Performance ==
=== Delhi Legislative Assembly Elections ===
Delhi Legislative Assembly Elections
Year	Assembly	Seats contested	Seats won	Change in seats	Percentage of votes	Vote swing	Popular vote	Outcome
1952	Interim	48	39 / 48	▲47	52.09%	New	271,812	Government
1993	1st	70	14 / 70	▼25	34.48%	▼17.61	12,24,361	Opposition
1998	2nd	70	52 / 70	▲38	47.75%	▲13.27	19,52,071	Government
2003	3rd	70	47 / 70	▼5	48.13%	▲0.38	21,72,062	Government
2008	4th	70	43 / 70	▼4	40.31%	▼7.82	24,89,816	Government
2013	5th	70	8 / 70	▼35	24.55%	▼15.76	19,32,933	External Support
2015	6th	70	0 / 70	▼8	9.70%	▼14.85	866,814	Others
2020	7th	66	0 / 70	Steady	4.26%	▼5.44	395,958	Others
2025	8th	70	0 / 70	Steady	6.34%	▲2.08	601,922	Others

=== Lok Sabha Elections ===
Lok Sabha Elections
Year	Lok Sabha	Seats contested	Seats won	Change in seats	Percentage of votes	Vote swing	Popular vote	Outcome
1951	1st	4	3 / 4	▲3	49.43%	New	3,24,214	Government
1957	2nd	5	5 / 5	▲2	54.33%	▲4.90	4,40,775	Government
1962	3rd	5	5 / 5	Steady	50.68%	▼3.65	4,53,174	Government
1967	4th	7	1 / 7	▼4	38.79%	▼11.89	4,34,937	Government
1971	5th	7	7 / 7	▲6	64.39%	▲25.60	8,35,673	Government
1977	6th	7	0 / 7	▼7	30.15%	▼34.24	5,42,145	Opposition
1980	7th	7	6 / 7	▲6	50.40%	▲20.25	9,90,004	Government
1984	8th	7	7 / 7	▲1	68.72%	▲18.32	15,28,252	Government
1989	9th	7	2 / 7	▼5	43.41%	▼25.31	13,22,876	Opposition
1991	10th	7	2 / 7	Steady	39.57%	▼3.84	11,52,627	Government
1996	11th	7	2 / 7	Steady	37.29%	▼2.28	14,99,128	Opposition
1998	12th	7	1 / 7	▼1	42.64%	▲5.35	17,98,165	Opposition
1999	13th	7	0 / 7	▼1	41.96%	▼0.68	15,91,682	Opposition
2004	14th	7	6 / 7	▲6	54.81%	▲12.85	22,61,199	Government
2009	15th	7	7 / 7	▲1	57.11%	▲2.30	32,85,353	Government
2014	16th	7	0 / 7	▼7	15.15%	▼41.96	12,53,078	Opposition
2019	17th	7	0 / 7	Steady	22.51%	▲7.36	19,53,900	Opposition
2024	18th	4	0 / 7	Steady	18.91%	▼3.60	16,85,494	Opposition

== See also ==
- Indian National Congress
- Congress Working Committee
- All India Congress Committee
- Pradesh Congress Committee
