= Dharanidhar Jena =

Indian politician

Member of Parliament, Lok Sabha
- In office 1967–1971
- Preceded by: Kanhu Charan Jena
- Succeeded by: Arjun Charan Sethi
- Constituency: Bhadrak, Odisha

Personal details
- Born: 1921 (age 104–105)
- Party: Swatantra Party
- Spouse: Basantaprabha Jena

Dharanidhar Jena was an Indian politician. He was elected to the Lok Sabha, the lower house of the Parliament of India from the Bhadrak in Odisha as a member of the Swatantra Party.
