= Maneklal Gandhi =

Indian politician

Maneklal Gandhi MP

Member of Parliament, 2nd Lok Sabha
- In office 1957–1962
- Constituency: Panchmahal

Member of Parliament, 1st Lok Sabha
- In office 1952–1957
- Constituency: Panchmahal

Member of Bombay Legislative Assembly
- In office 1937–1946

Personal details
- Born: Maneklal Maganlal Gandhi; 27 July 1901 Kalol, Bombay Presidency, British India (now Gujarat India)
- Died: 8 May 1989 (aged 87) kalol panchmahal
- Party: Indian National Congress
- Spouse: Dhirajben
- Children: 8
- Parent: Maganlal Narottamdas Gandhi (father)
- Education: Godhra Government High School

Maneklal Maganlal Gandhi (7 July 1901 - 8 May 1989), commonly known as Maneklal Gandhi, was an Indian politician, parliament and assembly member and social activist who served parliament member twice collectively from 1952 to 1962, and represented Panchmahal constituency after elected in the first and second general elections. He was affiliated with the Indian National Congress. Prior to India's first and second general elections, he served member of Bombay Legislative Assembly in 1937 and later in 1946 during the British rule. He served as a Member of the Legislative Assembly (MLA), Gujarat for two consecutive terms - 1972 and 1975.

== Biography ==
He was born to Maganlal Narottamdas Gandhi on 27 July 1901 at Kalol, Panchmahal, Bombay Presidency of British India (in modern-day Gujarat India). He received his education from Godhra Government High School. He joined Indian National Congress party as a social worker around 1921, and was imprisoned in 1930, 1932, 1940 and later in 1942, leading him to spend about seven years in prison.

Prior to his political career, he served president of Co-operative Industrial Association for Panchmahal district and president of M.G.S. college Godhra and Jinkorben Mafatlal Maternity Home. He also served chairperson of the Urban Co-operative Bank Ltd. and president of Congress Committee for Panchmahal district. He was later appointed as member of the All India Congress Committee (A.I.C.C), and the Gujarat Pradesh Congress Committee (G.P.C.C).

== Personal life ==
He was married to Dhirajben in May 1926, with whom he had eight children, including five sons and three daughters.
