= Kesariya Lok Sabha constituency =

Former constituency of the Indian parliament in Bihar

Coordinates: 26.4°N 84.9°E

Kesariya
- Former Lok Sabha constituency

Constituency details
- Country: India
- Region: East India
- State: Bihar
- Established: 1952
- Abolished: 1977
- Reservation: None

Kesariya Lok Sabha constituency was a Lok Sabha (parliamentary) constituency in Bihar state in eastern India till 1971.

== Members of Parliament ==
- 1952: Jhulan Sinha, Indian National Congress ( as Saran North)
- 1957: Dwarka Nath Tiwary, Indian National Congress
- 1962: Bhishma Prasad Yadava, Indian National Congress
- 1967: Kamla Mishra Madhukar, Communist Party of India
- 1971: Kamla Mishra Madhukar, Communist Party of India
- 1977 onwards: Does not exist

== See also ==
- Kesaria
- West Champaran district
- List of former constituencies of the Lok Sabha
