= Gadadhar Saha =

Indian politician (1934–2000)

Member of Parliament, Lok Sabha
- In office 1971-1989
- Preceded by: Sisir Kumar Das
- Succeeded by: Dr Ram Chandra Dome
- Constituency: Birbhum, West Bengal

Personal details
- Born: 1 January 1934 Palsa village, Birbhum district, Bengal Presidency British India
- Died: 25 October 2000 (aged 66)
- Party: CPI(M)
- Other political affiliations: Communist Party of India
- Spouse: Raimani Saha
- Children: 4 Sons and 4 daughters

Gadadhar Saha was an Indian politician belonging to the Communist Party of India (Marxist). He was elected to the Lok Sabha, the lower house of the Indian Parliament, from Birbhum constituency in West Bengal state in 1971, 1977, 1980 and 1984.
