= Hari Charan Soy =

Indian politician

Member of Parliament, Lok Sabha
- In office 1962–1967
- Preceded by: Shambhu Charan
- Succeeded by: Kolai Birua
- Constituency: Singhbhum, Bihar

Personal details
- Born: 19 December 1922
- Died: 7 October 1999 (aged 76) Bihar, India
- Party: Jharkhand Party
- Spouse: Kunti Mai

Hari Charan Soy (19 December 1922 – 7 October 1999) was an Indian politician. He was a Member of Parliament, representing Singhbhum, Bihar in the Lok Sabha the lower house of India's Parliament as a member of the Jharkhand Party. Soy died in Bihar on 7 October 1999, at the age of 76.
