= Ramchandra Dhondiba Bhandare =

Indian politician

R. D. Bhandare
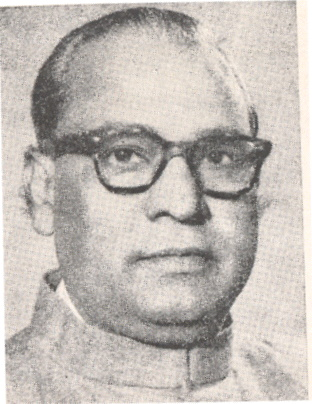

8th Governor of Andhra Pradesh
- In office 16 June 1976 – 17 February 1977
- Preceded by: Mohan Lal Sukhadia
- Succeeded by: B. J. Divan

8th Governor of Bihar
- In office 4 February 1973 – 15 June 1976
- Preceded by: Dev Kant Baruah
- Succeeded by: Jagannath Kaushal

Member of Parliament, Lok Sabha
- In office 1967–1973
- Preceded by: Narayan Sadoba Kajrolkar
- Succeeded by: Roza Vidyadhar Deshpande
- Constituency: Mumbai Central

1st Leader of the Opposition Maharashtra Legislative Assembly
- In office 1960–1962
- Preceded by: Position established
- Succeeded by: Krishnarao Dhulap

Personal details
- Born: 11 April 1916 Vita, Sangli, British India
- Died: 5 September 1988 (aged 72) Mumbai, Maharashtra.
- Party: Indian National Congress
- Other political affiliations: Scheduled Castes Federation
- Spouse: Shakuntala Bhandare
- Children: 4
- Website: The official R D Bhandare website www.rdbhandare.com
- As of 24 February, 2012

Ramchandra Dhondiba Bhandare (1916–1988) was an Indian politician, jurist and Ambedkarite activist. He was a member of the Indian National Congress (INC) political party, who was twice elected to Lok Sabha. He was elected to the 4th Lok Sabha from the Mumbai Central constituency of Maharashtra in 1967. He was re-elected in 1971 but resigned in 1973 when he was appointed Governor of Bihar. He was a colleague and follower of human rights leader B. R. Ambedkar.

== Early life ==
Ramachandra Bhandare was born into Mahar community at Vita, Sangli District, Maharashtra (earlier, Satara District, Bombay Presidency) to Dhondiba Hariba Bhandare, on 11 April 1916. When he was a child, the family moved to Bombay and settled there. After completing his primary education at Bhandare Uttara Worli Primary School and secondary education at Colabawadi, he attended the Maharashtra High School in Bombay. He held a BA from Elphinstone College, Mumbai, LLB and MA from Government Law College and Khalsa College, Bombay. After completing his studies, he started his career as advocate in Bombay. He also worked as a law professor at the same time. He was an Advocate and Professor of Law.

He was an Ambedkarite and Buddhist.

== Education ==
He completed his education from Elphinstone College, Government Law College and the Khalsa College, Bombay. He was married to Shakuntalabai and had 3 sons and 1 daughter and resided at Wadala Mumbai. He was earlier a Member of Bombay Municipal Corporation during 1948–57. He was a Member of Bombay Legislative Assembly during 1960–1962 and also acted as the Leader of the Opposition in Maharashtra Legislative Assembly during 1960–62. He was a Founder Member of Republican Party of India and remained its president from 1964 to 1966.

== As a labor and Dalit leader ==
Ramchandra Bhandare was active in the trade unions and was secretary to the Kamgar Sangam of the Bombay Municipal Council from 1942 to 1945. From 1949 to 1952, Babasaheb chaired a low-level Rural Servants Association, headed by Ambedkar. From 1952 to 1954 he was vice-president of the Bombay Textile Workers Union. From 1963 to 1966, Nawabharat was president of the Majdur Mahasabha. Bhandare has been a member of the Scheduled Castes Federation since its inception. He became president of the Bombay Pradesh Scheduled Castes Federation, a faction of the party. When Mahatma Gandhi came to visit Bombay, he left a mehtar's house in Worli to express his friendliness to the Dalits. In protest of this "demonstration" of Mahatma Gandhi, Bhandare and his followers protested by flying black flags. Consequently, a big feud between the Hindus and the Dalits began. In this confrontation, Bhandare stood firm and rose to prominence as a leader of the Bombay Scheduled Castes. In 1946 he established a library at Worli. He set up a Tamil community in every area of Bombay. With the Bhandare initiative, Ambedkar's birthday began to be celebrated on a large scale. 14 April 1950 Nirdhar started a weekly newspaper. That lasted for two years.

== Politics ==
Bhandare served as a member of the Bombay Municipality from 1948 to 1957. From 1960 to 1962, he was a member of the Bombay Legislative Assembly and was the Leader of the Opposition in that House. Bhandare was a founding member of the Republican Party of India. He also served as the President of the party from 1964 to 1966. Later he contested elections as a member of Congress Party in 1967 and 1971, and was elected to Lok Sabha from Bombay Central seat. He was also Governor of Bihar during 1973–1976 and Governor of Andhra Pradesh during 1976–77.

== Death ==
Bhandare died at his home in Bombay on September 5, 1988.
