= Sisir Kumar Saha =

Indian politician

Member of Parliament, Lok Sabha
- In office 1962-1971
- Succeeded by: Gadadhar Saha
- Constituency: Birbhum, West Bengal

Personal details
- Born: January 1896 Kirnaher, Birbhum, Bengal Presidency.British India
- Party: Indian National Congress

Sisir Kumar Saha was an Indian politician. He was elected to the Lok Sabha, the lower house of the Parliament of India as a member of the Indian National Congress.
