= Sangappa A. Agadi =

Indian politician and former Member of Parliament

Member of the Lok Sabha
- In office 1967–1971
- Preceded by: Sivamurthi Swami Alavandi
- Succeeded by: Sidrameshwara Swami
- Constituency: Koppal

Member of the Lok Sabha
- In office 1957–1962
- Preceded by: Sivamurthi Swami Alavandi
- Succeeded by: Sivamurthi Swami Alavandi
- Constituency: Koppal

Personal details
- Party: Indian National Congress
- Profession: Politician, farmer

Sangappa Andanappa Agadi (often called S. A. Agadi or A. Sanganna) was an Indian politician and farmer. He served as a Member of Parliament in the Lok Sabha for two terms. He represented the Koppal area in Mysore State. The state was later renamed Karnataka in 1973. Agadi was a member of the Indian National Congress party. He worked for the farming communities of the new Mysore State during the late 1950s and 1960s.

== Early life and background ==
The exact dates of his birth and death are not widely known in public records. Agadi came from the Koppal district. This area depended mostly on farming. It was historically under the rule of the Nizam of Hyderabad before joining India. Agadi joined politics around the time of the States Reorganisation Act, 1956. This law brought Kannada speaking areas into the new Mysore State. His political work focused on rural development and farming policies for the people of Koppal.

== Political career ==
During his political career, Agadi mostly contested elections against Sivamurthi Swami Alavandi. Alavandi was an independent candidate. They competed against each other in three parliament elections in 1957, 1962, and 1967 for the Koppal seat.

=== 2nd Lok Sabha (1957 to 1962) ===
The 1957 Indian general election was the first election after the reorganisation of states. The Indian National Congress chose Agadi to contest from Koppal. He contested against the sitting Member of Parliament, Sivamurthi Swami. Agadi won the election with 130,849 votes. He defeated Swami and entered the 2nd Lok Sabha.

During his time in the 2nd Lok Sabha, Agadi worked on connecting his newly formed state area with central government plans. He mainly supported farming reforms. In the next 1962 Indian general election, Agadi lost the election. His rival Sivamurthi Swami Alavandi won the seat back.

=== 4th Lok Sabha (1967 to 1971) ===
Agadi returned to politics in the 1967 Indian general election. He contested again for the Indian National Congress. He faced S. S. Alwandi once more. This time Alwandi represented the Lok Sewak Sangh. Agadi received 166,690 votes. He won back the Koppal seat and entered the 4th Lok Sabha.

==== Supreme Court election case ====
The 1967 election result led to a legal case that reached the Supreme Court of India. His defeated opponent, S. S. Alwandi, filed a case against Agadi's win. Alwandi claimed there were corrupt practices in the election. The case first went to the High Court of Mysore. The High Court rejected Alwandi's case and supported Agadi's win.

Alwandi then took the case to the Supreme Court of India. The case was named Shivamurthy Swami v. Agadi Sanganna Andanappa. The Supreme Court checked the claims of election cheating. They found no strong proof to cancel the election result. The court cleared Agadi of the charges. He completed his term in the 4th Lok Sabha until 1971.

== Parliamentary work ==
Agadi frequently raised matters concerning irrigation projects, food grain procurement, agricultural credit, and development of backward regions of Mysore State.

== Election results ==
Electoral performance
Year	Election	Party	Votes	Opponent	Result
1957	2nd Lok Sabha	Indian National Congress	130,849	Sivamurthi Swami (Independent)	Won
1962	3rd Lok Sabha	Indian National Congress	—	Sivamurthi Swami Alavandi (Independent)	Lost
1967	4th Lok Sabha	Indian National Congress	166,690	S. S. Alwandi (Lok Sewak Sangh)	Won

== Legacy ==
A commercial building known as the S. A. Agadi Complex, located near the central bus stand in Koppal, is named after Agadi in recognition of his public service.

== See also ==
- Koppal Lok Sabha constituency
- List of members of the 2nd Lok Sabha
- List of members of the 4th Lok Sabha
- Elections in Karnataka
