= Abdul Ibrahim (politician) =

Indian politician

Member of 1st Lok Sabha
- In office 1952–unknown
- President: Rajendra Prasad
- Prime Minister: Jawaharlal Nehru
- Constituency: Ranchi

Personal details
- Born: 1 January 1915 Ranchi, India
- Party: Indian National Congress
- Education: Patna University

Abdul Ibrahim was an Indian politician and member of first Lok Sabha who represented Ranchi North East parliamentary constituency in 1952. He was affiliated with the Indian National Congress.

== Biography ==
He was born to Dilawar Ali Ansari on 1 January 1915 in Ranchi, Jharkhand. He received his education at Doranda L.P. School and St. Gossner High School and St. Paul's High School. He obtained his further studies from Calcutta University in 1934 to 1938 and Patna University in 1942. He served as a member of Working Committee of All India Momin Conference and member of Reception Committee of Bihar Congress Workers Camp at Ranchi in 1949.
