= Nemi Saran Jain =

Indian politician

Nemi Saran Jain (born 2 April 1899) was an India Command politician and Member of parliament in the 1st Lok Sabha representing Bijnor.
