= Lallanji =

Indian politician

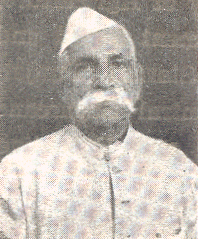
Lallanji in 1952

Lallanji was an Indian politician. He was born in Faizabad in November 1879, son of Mendu Lal. Lallanji was a landlord and member of the Indian National Congress. He hailed from the Khatri community. He had been schooled at Government High School in Faizabad. He was influenced by the Arya Samaj during his youth.

He served as President of the Faizabad District Congress Committee. In May 1948 he became the President of the Faizabad District Board. He was a member of the All India Congress Committee and the Uttar Pradesh Congress Committee. He was a member of the Ram Yash Kirtan Sabha.

Within the Indian National Congress, he emerged as the leader of the Gupta-Pant faction in Faizabad.

Lallanji was elected to the first Lok Sabha (lower house of the parliament of India) from the Faizabad District (North-West) constituency in the 1952 Indian general election. He obtained 111,547 votes. He defeated Acharya J.B. Kripalani.

Lallanji died in Faizabad on 20 May 1958.
