= Prem Singh (Delhi politician) =

Indian politician

Ch. Prem Singh

Speaker, Delhi Legislative Assembly
- In office 1998–2003
- In office 2004–2008

MLA, Delhi Legislative Assembly
- In office 1993–2013

Executive Councillor (Development), Metropolitan Council of Delhi
- In office 1983–1990

Councillor, Metropolitan Council of Delhi
- In office 1967–1990

Councillor, Municipal Corporation of Delhi
- In office 1958–1967

President, Delhi Pradesh Congress Committee
- In office 1988–1992
- In office 1997–1998
- In office 2003–2004

Personal details
- Born: 20 December 1932 Delhi, British India
- Died: 12 December 2017 (aged 84) New Delhi, India
- Cause of death: Heart Attack
- Party: Indian National Congress
- Education: Zakir Husain Delhi College
- As of 6 December 2013 Source: Government of India

Choudhary Prem Singh (20 December 1932 – 12 December 2017) was an Indian politician from Delhi. He contested his first election from Ambedkar Nagar in 1958, and made a Guinness World Record of continuously winning for 55 years, 10 elections from the same party & same constituency. He twice served as Speaker of Delhi Legislative Assembly. He also held several ministries. He also served as the president of the Delhi Pradesh Congress Committee three times.

Prem Singh was elected to the Municipal Corporation of Delhi (MCD) in 1958 and 1962. He was then elected to the Metropolitan Council of Delhi four times during 1972–1983. He was elected to the Delhi Legislative Assembly four times in a row during 1993–2008. His name features in the Guinness World Record & Limca Book of Records for winning 10 consecutive elections from the same constituency and the same party. He has also served on the Delhi Pradesh Congress Committee and the All India Congress Committee.

== Early life ==
Prem Singh was born in Jatav family at Lado Sarai, Delhi. His father, Chaudhary Himmat Singh was a participant in the Indian Independence movement. Prem Singh graduated in science from Delhi College (now Zakir Husain Delhi College) in 1952.

== Political career ==
Prem Singh joined the Indian National Congress in 1952, at the insistence of his mentor C. Krishnan Nair (CK Nair), who was a senior Congress MP and known as the initial nominee to become the first CM of Delhi. In 1958, he became the youngest member of the Municipal Corporation of Delhi (MCD) and the first chairman of its Committee on Delhi Rural Area. He was re-elected to MCD in 1962. He went on to serve on the Education and Works committees of MCD, and also served as the Deputy Chairman of the Zonal Committee.

In 1967, Prem Singh was elected to the newly constituted Metropolitan Council of Delhi (predecessor of the Delhi Legislative Assembly). He was re-elected to the Metropolitan Council in 1972, 1977 and 1983. He served as an Executive Council member during the Fourth Metropolitan Council (1983–1990).

Also in 1967, he was elected as a member of the Delhi Pradesh Congress Committee (DPCC), the decision-making body of the Congress in Delhi. In 1969, he became a member of All India Congress Committee, the central decision-making assembly of the party. He went on to win consecutive DPCC elections in 1972, 1977 and 1983. He served as the General Secretary of DPCC during 1969–1975, and as its president in 1977 and during 1988–1992.

He was elected to the first Legislative Assembly of Delhi in 1993, and went on to win the next three elections in 1998, 2003 and 2008. He also served as the speaker of the second (1998–2003) and the third (2004–2008) Assemblies. In 2013, he lost the election to Aam Aadmi Party's Ashok Kumar, coming third.

== Personal life ==
Prem Singh lived in the Lado Sarai area of Mehrauli with his wife Shivkauri; the couple had 6 daughters and 2 sons. His elder son Pramod Choudhary (born 1971) was also elected to the MCD in 2007. Other son Yaduraj Chaudhary ventured into politics as a member of the Delhi Youth Congress. Now his eldest grandson Dev Choudhary (S/O Pramod) has followed suit and entered the political arena at the young age of just 21, ironically endorsing the Bharatiya Janata Party (BJP) because of its ideology.

== Death ==
Prem Singh suffered a heart attack while participating in a party event on B. R. Ambedkar's death anniversary (Mahaparinirvan Divas) on 6 December 2017. He was admitted to the Heart & Lung Institute but on 9 December 2017, he was shifted to Max Hospital (Saket), and died there on 12 December 2017 after having 4 more heart attacks.
