= Mumbai Central Lok Sabha constituency =

Former constituency of the Indian parliament in Maharashtra

Coordinates: 19.00°N 72.82°E

Bombay Central
- Former Lok Sabha constituency

Constituency details
- Country: India
- Region: Western India
- State: Maharashtra
- District: Bombay
- Established: 1957
- Abolished: 1977

Bombay Central Lok Sabha constituency was one of the Lok Sabha constituencies in Bombay State, later in Maharashtra (1960 onwards). It became defunct in 1977 when constituency boundaries were redrawn.

== Members of Parliament ==
Year	Member	Party
1952	Did not exist	
Bombay City Central Lok Sabha constituency
1957	Shripad Amrit Dange	CPI
1957	Gopal Kaluji Manay	SCF
1962	Did not exist	
Bombay Central Lok Sabha constituency
1967	R. D. Bhandare	INC
1971	R. D. Bhandare	INC
1977 onwards didn't exist

== Election results ==
=== 1957 ===
1957 Indian general election: Bombay City Central
Party	Candidate	Votes	%	±%
CPI	Shripad Amrit Dange (Note: Seat 1 of 2 membered constituency)	323,526	30.64	
SCF	Gopal Kaluji Manay (Note: Seat 2 of 2 membered constituency)	303,875	28.78	
INC	Narayanrao Sadoba Kajrolkar	2,09,769	19.87	
INC	Gangadhar Dattatraya Ambekar	1,87,241	17.74	
Independent	Nilkanth Baburao Parulekar	15,881	1.50	
Independent	Sudhir Laxman Hendre	15,440	1.46	
RRP	E. M. Awati	0	0.00	
Margin of victory				
Total valid votes		10,55,732		
Rejected ballots				
Turnout		10,55,732	67.41	
Registered electors		7,83,116		
CPI win (new seat)				
SCF win (new seat)				

=== 1967 ===
1967 Indian general election: Bombay Central
Party	Candidate	Votes	%	±%
INC	R. D. Bhandare	158,060	45.48	
RPI	P. K. Atre	1,51,108	43.48	
Independent	B. C. Kamble	38,405	11.05	
Margin of victory		6,952	2.00	
Total valid votes		3,47,573		
Rejected ballots		10,266	2.87	
Turnout		3,57,839	68.75	
Registered electors		5,20,524		
INC win (new seat)				

=== 1971 ===
1971 Indian general election: Bombay Central
Party	Candidate	Votes	%	±%
INC	R. D. Bhandare	216,114	61.35	
SS	Manohar Joshi	11,6572	33.09	
Independent	B. C. Kamble	15,144	4.30	
RPI(K)	Gangaram Dasharath Ghokshe	2,744	0.78	
Independent	Ramaswamy Kamala	922	0.26	
Independent	Yeshwant Trimbak Pradhan	788	0.22	
Margin of victory		99,542	28.26	
Total valid votes		3,52,284		
Rejected ballots		5,054	1.41	
Turnout		3,57,338	64.91	
Registered electors		5,50,555		
INC hold		Swing		

== See also ==
- List of constituencies of the Lok Sabha
