= Jhulan Sinha =

Indian politician

Member of Parliament, Lok Sabha
- In office 1957-1962
- Succeeded by: Mohammad Yusuf
- Constituency: Siwan, Bihar
- In office 1952-1957
- Succeeded by: Dwarka Nath Tiwary
- Constituency: Saran North, Bihar

Personal details
- Born: 27 October 1904 Hajiapur
- Party: Indian National Congress
- Spouse: Ayodhya Devi
- Children: Sheo Pratap Singh aka Jailor Babu, Kanti Devi and (foster son) Mohan Sinha.

Jhulan Sinha was an Indian politician, lawyer and social worker. He was a close compatriot of Dr Rajendra Prasad and was one of the leading freedom fighters from Bihar. Influenced by Mahatma Gandhi, he gave up his successful law practice to join the freedom struggle, work for the farmers and social causes. He was elected to the Lok Sabha, lower house of the Parliament of India twice as a member of the Indian National Congress. He was also a member of the Bihar Legislative Assembly.
