= Shambhu Charan Godsora =

Indian politician (born 1926)

Shambhu Charan

Member of Parliament, Lok Sabha
- In office 1957–1962
- Succeeded by: Hari Charan Soy
- Constituency: Singhbhum, Bihar

Personal details
- Born: 1 January 1926 Jamshedpur, Bihar, British India (Presently Jharkhand, India)
- Party: Jharkhand Party
- Spouse: Malti Jarika

Shambhu Charan Godsora (born 1 January 1926) was an Indian politician. He was a Member of Parliament, representing Singhbhum, Bihar in the Lok Sabha the lower house of India's Parliament as a member of the Jharkhand Party.
