= Chaudhary Pratap Singh Daulta =

Indian politician

Chaudhary Pratap Singh Daulta (born 13 April 1918) was an Indian politician and leader of Communist Party of India. He represented Jhajjar - Rewari constituency in 2nd Lok Sabha.

He was previously associated with Unionist Party. He imprisoned a number of times in connection with Kisan movements.

== Position Held ==
- Vice-president Punjab Kisan Sabha, 1953–55;
- President, Punjab Young Zamindara Association, 1943
