= Sisir Kumar Das =

Indian linguist, poet, playwright, translator, comparatist and scholar

- শিশির কুমার দাশ
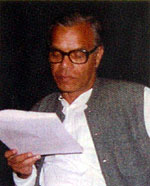
- Born: November 1936; Calcutta, British India
- Died: 7 May 2003 (aged 66); Kolkata, India
- Education: South Suburban School (Main), Presidency College, University of Calcutta, School of Oriental and African Studies, University of London
- Occupations: Poet, Dramatist, Essayist, Translator, Scholar, Comparatist, Linguist
- Parent(s): Mukul Chandra Das (Father), Sarala Devi (Mother)
- Awards: Rabindra Puraskar

Sisir Kumar Das (1936–2003) was an Indian scholar of literature, specializing in Indian literature, as well as a linguist, poet, playwright, translator, and comparatist. His three-volume A History of Indian Literature (covering 1800–1910, 1911–1956, and 800–1399) is a significant contribution to the field. He also edited the multi-volume English Writings of Rabindranath Tagore.

Das's work spanned various languages and literary traditions. Though his formal training was in Bengali language and literature, he significantly influenced the development of Comparative Literature in India. He advocated for a comparative approach to literary studies, arguing that it offered a more comprehensive understanding of literature.

A poet and playwright in Bengali, Das received the Rabindra Puraskar twice (1976 and 1987). His poetry collection Abalupta Chaturtha Charan (The Disappeared Fourth Line) is considered a major work in 20th-century Bengali poetry. Several of his plays were performed by the theatre group Bahuroopi.

== Life and career ==
Sisir Kumar Das was born in November 1936 to Mukunda Chandra Das and Sarala Das. After graduating from Presidency College, Calcutta (1955) and completing his master's degree at the University of Calcutta (1957), he taught briefly in West Bengal. From 1960 to 1963, he taught at the School of Oriental and African Studies, London. In 1963, he earned his doctorate, submitting theses at both the University of Calcutta and the University of London. He joined the Department of Indian Languages and Literary Studies at Delhi University in 1963, where he taught until 2001. He held the position of Tagore Professor (1980–2001) and served as president of the Comparative Literature Association of India (CLAI) from 1999 until his death in 2003.

His translations introduced ancient Greek literature to Bengali readers. His play Aloukik Sanglap features dialogues between historical figures like Kalidasa, Aristotle, Parashuram, and Orestes. Das also explored the Bhakti movement and its literature.

Das's A History of Indian Literature was a significant undertaking. He aimed to create an integrated history encompassing multiple languages and literary cultures. The first volume, Western Impact: Indian Response 1800–1910 (1991), was followed by Struggle for Freedom: Triumph and Tragedy 1911–1956 (1995). He acknowledged the vastness of the project and hoped his work would inspire further research. Das died on 7 May 2003, while working on the medieval period (500-1399 AD). Das also wrote for children.

== Awards and honors ==
- Nehru Prize from the Federal Republic of Germany (1970)
- Philippines Amodiesa of National Language (1974)
- Rabindra Puraskar for The Shadow of the Cross (1976) and The Artist in Chains (1987)
- Sudhamoyee Smriti Padak from the University of Calcutta (1996)
- Kamal Kumari National Award (1995)
- Honored as a distinguished playwright by Paschimbanga Natya Akademi (1995)
- Honored by Tagore Research Institute (1996)
