= Radha Raman (politician) =

Indian politician

Radha Raman was an Indian politician and freedom fighter of Indian National Congress who served as Member of the 1st Lok Sabha (1952-57) from Delhi (Walled) City and the 2nd Lok Sabha 1957-62 from Chandni Chowk Lok Sabha constituency and President of Delhi Pradesh Congress Committee before independence as well as after independence on 24 March 1970. He also served as Chief Executive Councillor of Delhi (now known as Chief Minister of Delhi) from 1972 to 1977. He was the first politician to represent Chandni Chowk in the Lok Sabha.

== Personal life ==
He was born at Delhi on 4th August 1904.
