= Birbhum Lok Sabha constituency =

Lok Sabha constituency in West Bengal

Coordinates: 23°55′00″N 87°32′00″E

Birbhum WB-42
- Lok Sabha constituency
- Interactive Map Outlining Birbhum Lok Sabha Constituency

Constituency details
- Country: India
- Region: East India
- State: West Bengal
- Assembly constituencies: Dubrajpur; Suri; Sainthia; Rampurhat; Hansan; Nalhati; Murarai
- Established: 1951
- Total electors: 18,57,022
- Reservation: None

Member of Parliament
- 18th Lok Sabha
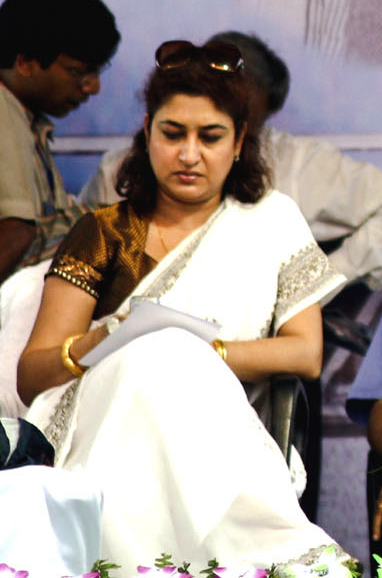
- Incumbent Satabdi Roy
- Party: NCPI
- Alliance: NDA
- Elected year: 2024

Birbhum Lok Sabha constituency is one of the 543 parliamentary constituencies in India. The constituency centres on the western part of Birbhum district in West Bengal. All the seven assembly segments of No. 42 Birbhum Lok Sabha constituency are in Birbhum district. The seat was reserved for scheduled castes from 1962 to 2004, but was declared a free seat in 2009 general elections.

== Assembly segments ==
Parliamentary constituencies in West Bengal - 1. Cooch Behar, 2. Alipurduars, 3. Jalpaiguri, 4. Darjeeling, 5. Raiganj, 6. Balurghat, 7. Maldaha Uttar, 8. Maldaha Dakshin, 9. Jangipur, 10. Baharampur, 11. Murshidabad, 12. Krishnanagar, 13. Ranaghat, 14. Bangaon, 15. Barrackpore, 16. Dum Dum, 17. Barasat, 18. Basirhat, 19. Jaynagar, 20. Mathurapur, 21. Diamond Harbour, 22. Jadavpur, 23. Kolkata Dakshin, 24. Kolkata Uttar, 25. Howrah, 26. Uluberia, 27. Serampore, 28. Hooghly, 29. Arambagh, 30. Tamluk, 31, Kanthi, 32. Ghatal, 33. Jhargram, 34. Medinipur, 35. Purulia, 36. Bankura, 37. Bishnupur, 38. Bardhaman Purba, 39. Bardhaman Durgapur, 40. Asansol, 41. Bolpur, 42. Birbhum

As per order of the Delimitation Commission issued in 2006 in respect of the delimitation of constituencies in the West Bengal, parliamentary constituency no. 42 Birbhum is composed of the following assembly segments from 2009:

#	Name	District	Member	Party	2024 Lead
284	Dubrajpur (SC)	Birbhum	Anup Kumar Saha	BJP	AITC
285	Suri	Birbhum	Jagannath Chattopadhyay	BJP	AITC
289	Sainthia (SC)	Birbhum	Krishna Kanta Saha	BJP	AITC
291	Rampurhat	Birbhum	Dhruba Saha	BJP	AITC
292	Hansan	Birbhum	Fayezul Haque	AITC	AITC
293	Nalhati	Birbhum	Rajendra Prasad Singh	AITC	AITC
294	Murarai	Birbhum	Mosarraf Hossain	AITC	AITC

Prior to delimitation, Birbhum Lok Sabha constituency was composed of the following assembly segments: Rajnagar (SC) (assembly constituency no. 287), Suri (assembly constituency no. 288), Mohammad Bazar (assembly constituency no. 289), Rampurhat (assembly constituency no. 291), Hansan (SC) (assembly constituency no. 292), Nalhati (assembly constituency no. 293) and Murarai (assembly constituency no. 294).

== Members of Parliament ==
Year	Member	Party
1952	Kamal Krishna Das	Indian National Congress
1952	Anil Kumar Chanda	Indian National Congress
1957	Kamal Krishna Das	Indian National Congress
1957	Anil Kumar Chanda	Indian National Congress
1962	Sisir Kumar Saha	Indian National Congress
1967	Sisir Kumar Saha	Indian National Congress
1971	Gadadhar Saha	Communist Party of India (Marxist)
1977	Gadadhar Saha	Communist Party of India (Marxist)
1980	Gadadhar Saha	Communist Party of India (Marxist)
1984	Gadadhar Saha	Communist Party of India (Marxist)
1989	Ram Chandra Dome	Communist Party of India (Marxist)
1991	Ram Chandra Dome	Communist Party of India (Marxist)
1996	Ram Chandra Dome	Communist Party of India (Marxist)
1998	Ram Chandra Dome	Communist Party of India (Marxist)
1999	Ram Chandra Dome	Communist Party of India (Marxist)
2004	Ram Chandra Dome	Communist Party of India (Marxist)
2009	Satabdi Roy	Trinamool Congress
2014	Satabdi Roy	Trinamool Congress
2019	Satabdi Roy	Trinamool Congress
2024	Satabdi Roy	Trinamool Congress
2026 (Note: Switched to NCPI as part of AITC Rebels in Lok Sabha.)	Satabdi Roy	Nationalist Citizens Party of India

== Election results ==
Vote share of Winning candidates
2024	47.00%
2019	45.13%
2014	36.09%
2009	47.82%
2004	51.42%
1999	51.65%
1998	49.07%
1996	50.35%
1991	49.71%
1989	50.88%
1984	50.32%
1980	51.91%
1977	49.00%
1971	39.59%
1967	36.27%
1962	43.15%
1957	32.49%
1951	23.19%

=== 2024 ===
2024 Indian general elections: Birbhum
Party	Candidate	Votes	%	±%
AITC	Satabdi Roy	717,961	47.00	▲1.87
BJP	Debtanu Bhattacharya	520,311	34.06	▼4.93
INC	Milton Rashid	226,260	14.81	▲9.60
NOTA	None of the above	14,093	0.92	▲0.07
Majority		197,650	12.94	▲6.75
Turnout		1,527,432	82.25	▼3.09
AITC hold		Swing		

=== 2019 ===
2019 Indian general elections: Birbhum
Party	Candidate	Votes	%	±%
AITC	Satabdi Roy	654,070	45.13	▲7.32
BJP	Dudh Kumar Mondal	565,153	38.99	▲20.52
CPI(M)	Dr. Rezaul Karim	96,763	6.68	▼24.14
INC	Imam Hossain	75,451	5.21	▼5.14
NOTA	None of the Above	12,307	0.85	N/A
Majority		89,711	6.19	
Turnout		1,450,108	85.34	
AITC hold		Swing		

=== 2014 ===
2014 Indian general elections: Birbhum
Party	Candidate	Votes	%	±%
AITC	Satabdi Roy	460,568	36.09	▼11.72
CPI(M)	Dr. Mohammed Qamre Elahi	393,305	30.82	▼10.95
BJP	Joy Banerjee	235,753	18.47	▲13.85
INC	Syed Siraj Jimmi	132,084	10.35	N/A
JMM	Shibratan Sharma	7,989	0.62	▲0.47
SP	Prasanta Roy	7,194	0.56	▼1.12
Majority		67,263	5.27	▼0.77
Turnout		1,275,819	85.33	
AITC hold		Swing	▲2.49	

=== 2009 ===
2009 Indian general elections: Birbhum
Party	Candidate	Votes	%	±%
AITC	Satabdi Roy	486,553	47.82	
CPI(M)	Braja Mukherjee	425,034	41.77	
BJP	Tapas Mukherjee	47,068	4.62	
SP	Asgar Ali	17,177	1.68	
BSP	Radheshyam Singh	13,388	1.31	
JMM	Shib Ratan Sharma	1,591	0.15	
Majority		61,519	6.04	
Turnout		1,017,493	83.27	
AITC gain from CPI(M)		Swing		

=== 2004 ===
2004 Indian general election: Birbhum
Party	Candidate	Votes	%	±%
CPI(M)	Ram Chandra Dome	372,294	51.42	
INC	Gopal Chandra Das	1,80,682	24.95	
BJP	Arjun Saha	1,40,196	19.36	
Independent	Braja Mohon Das	14,762	2.04	
JD(S)	Chinta Sarkar	9,594	1.33	
BSP	Kartik Chandra Das	6,533	0.90	
Majority		1,91,612	26.46	
Turnout				
CPI(M) hold		Swing		

=== 1999 ===
1999 Indian general election: Birbhum
Party	Candidate	Votes	%	±%
CPI(M)	Ram Chandra Dome	373,687	51.65	
BJP	Dr. Madan Lal Choudhury	2,16,531	29.93	
INC	Asit Kumar Mal	1,26,305	17.46	
Independent	Brajo Mohon Das	4,808	0.66	
JP	Narayan Chandra Das	2,229	0.31	
Majority		1,57,156	21.72	
Turnout		7,34,173	70.33	
CPI(M) hold		Swing		

=== 1998 ===
1998 Indian general election: Birbhum
Party	Candidate	Votes	%	±%
CPI(M)	Ram Chandra Dome	380,314	49.07	
BJP	Dr. Madan Lal Choudhury	2,18,802	28.23	
INC	Asit Kr Mal	1,64,555	21.23	
Independent	Braja Mohan Das	5,632	0.73	
Independent	Nani Gopal Das	4,146	0.53	
Independent	Sadhan Saha	1,672	0.22	
Majority		1,61,512	20.84	
Turnout		7,89,909	76.83	
CPI(M) hold		Swing		

=== 1996 ===
1996 Indian general election: Birbhum
Party	Candidate	Votes	%	±%
CPI(M)	Ramchandra Dome	402,893	50.35	
INC	Mamata Saha	2,91,873	36.48	
BJP	Biswanath Mondal	88,343	11.04	
Independent	Asim Saha	9,370	1.17	
Independent	Onkar Rabidas	5,759	0.72	
Independent	Prakash Mondal	1,877	0.23	
Majority		1,11,020	13.87	
Turnout		8,27,366	83.18	
CPI(M) hold		Swing		

=== 1991 ===
1991 Indian general election: Birbhum
Party	Candidate	Votes	%	±%
CPI(M)	Dome Ramchandra	334,307	49.71	
INC	Subhendu Mondal	1,71,276	25.47	
BJP	Biswanath Mondal	1,40,944	20.96	
Independent	Asim Saha	14,282	2.12	
Doordarshi Party	Onkar Rabidas	5,816	0.86	
IUML	Dukari Saha	3,789	0.56	
Independent	Asish Kumar Saba	2,152	0.32	
Majority		1,63,031	24.24	
Turnout		6,92,508	75.21	
CPI(M) hold		Swing		

=== 1989 ===
1989 Indian general election: Birbhum
Party	Candidate	Votes	%	±%
CPI(M)	Dome Ramchandra	345,898	50.88	
INC	Badal Bagdi	2,83,949	41.77	
IUML	Dukari Saha	24,076	3.54	
Independent	Baidyanatha Mal	14,229	2.09	
JP	Basudev Mondal	10,026	1.47	
Independent	Ranajit Mal	1,621	0.24	
Majority		61,949	9.11	
Turnout		6,92,217	76.28	
CPI(M) hold		Swing		

=== 1984 ===
1984 Indian general election: Birbhum
Party	Candidate	Votes	%	±%
CPI(M)	Gadadhar Saha	278,155	50.32	
INC	Badal Bagdi	2,64,674	47.88	
SUCI	Asim Saha	8,930	1.62	
Independent	Ranjit Kumar Mal	1,019	0.18	
Majority		13,481	2.44	
Turnout		5,63,391	74.98	
CPI(M) hold		Swing		

=== 1980 ===
1980 Indian general election: Birbhum
Party	Candidate	Votes	%	±%
CPI(M)	Gadadhar Saha	223,756	51.91	
INC(I)	Badal Chandra Bagdi	1,83,093	42.48	
SUCI	Baidya Nath Mal	15,189	3.52	
JP(S)	Golak Pati Mandal	4,632	1.07	
JP	Kanai Saha	2,979	0.69	
Independent	Ranjit Mal	1,404	0.33	
Majority		40,663	9.43	
Turnout		4,41,811	67.18	
CPI(M) hold		Swing		

=== 1977 ===
1977 Indian general election: Birbhum
Party	Candidate	Votes	%	±%
CPI(M)	Gadadhar Saha	136,517	49.00	
INC	Birendaban Saha	1,05,968	38.04	
SUCI	Brajagopal Saha	19,913	7.15	
Independent	Kanai Saha	16,206	5.82	
Majority		30,549	10.96	
Turnout		2,88,116	52.08	
CPI(M) hold		Swing		

=== 1971 ===
1971 Indian general election: Birbhum
Party	Candidate	Votes	%	±%
CPI(M)	Gadadhar Saha	80,712	39.59	
INC	Kanai Saha	72,327	35.47	
AIFB	Sankar Bauri	40,176	19.70	
INC(O)	Sristi Dhar Josh	10,675	5.24	
Majority		8,385	4.12	
Turnout		2,15,720	43.86	
CPI(M) gain from INC		Swing		

=== 1967 ===
1967 Indian general election: Birbhum
Party	Candidate	Votes	%	±%
INC	S. K. Saha	83,696	36.27	
FL	G. Bauri	51,479	22.31	
Independent	B. Saha	51,076	22.13	
Independent	R. Sarma	36,403	15.77	
Independent	S. D. Das	8,131	3.52	
Majority		32,217	13.96	
Turnout		2,42,686	52.04	
INC hold		Swing		

=== 1962 ===
1962 Indian general election: Birbhum
Party	Candidate	Votes	%	±%
INC	Sisir Kumar Saha	74,573	43.15	
FL	Mrityunjay Mandal	42,169	24.40	
PSP	Kashinath Saha	31,428	18.19	
Independent	Kamal Krishna Das	24,641	14.26	
Majority		32,404	18.75	
Turnout		1,80,916	38.28	
INC hold		Swing		

=== 1957 ===
1957 Indian general election: Birbhum
Party	Candidate	Votes	%	±%
INC	Kamal Krishna Das	239,745	32.49	
INC	Anil Kumar Chanda	1,97,747	26.80	
HM	Manmatha Nath Das	1,69,045	22.91	
HM	Nitya Narayan Banerjee	1,31,376	17.80	
Majority		41,998	5.69	
Turnout		7,37,913	42.85	
INC hold		Swing		

=== 1951 ===
1951 Indian general election: Birbhum
Party	Candidate	Votes	%	±%
INC	Anil Kumar Chanda	116,734	23.19	
INC	Kamal Krishna Das	1,09,722	21.80	
HM	Nitya Narayan Bandopadhyaya	90,311	17.94	
KMPP	Mihir Lal Chattopadhyaya	58,904	11.70	
Independent	Dhirendra Nath Rai	41,237	8.19	
Socialist	Umapati Mitra	38,919	7.73	
Independent	Kazi Abu Muhammad	27,082	5.38	
RSP	Sudhir Kumar Ghose	20,501	4.07	
Majority		7,012	1.39	
Turnout		5,03,410	33.04	
INC win (new seat)				

== See also ==
- Birbhum district
- List of constituencies of the Lok Sabha
