= Kanhu Charan Jena =

Indian politician (1920–2000)

Member of Parliament, Lok Sabha
- In office 1952–1967
- Succeeded by: Dharanidhar Jena
- Constituency: Bhadrak, Odisha

Personal details
- Born: 27 February 1920 Sohora, Balasore, Orissa, British India
- Died: 21 February 2000 (aged 79) Bhadrak, Odisha
- Party: Indian National Congress
- Spouse: Saraswati Debi

Kanhu Charan Jena (27 February 1920 – 21 February 2000) was an Indian politician. He was elected to the Lok Sabha, the lower house of the Parliament of India from the Bhadrak in Odisha as a member of the Indian National Congress.
