= C. Krishnan Nair =

Indian politician

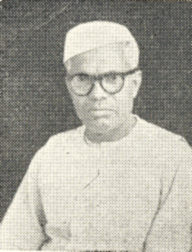
C Krishnan Nair during the 1950s

C Krishnan Nair (1902–1986) was an Indian politician of the Indian National Congress, an Indian Independence activist, a Gandhian who participated in the Salt March of 1930 and a Member of the Indian Parliament of the First and Second Lok Sabha. He was popularly known as Delhi Gandhi or Nairji.

== Early life and political career ==
Krishnan Nair was born in 1902 at Neyyattinkara in Travancore state of British India (present day Kerala state) as the son of Shri Padmanathan. He received his elementary education at Neyyattinkara High School and Sri Moola Vilasam High School, Trivandrum. He also received further education at Jamia Millia Islamia, Aligarh and Delhi.

After giving up his studies, he joined the Independence movement led by Mahatma Gandhi. He had also worked as a teacher at the Indraprastha Gurukul, Faridabad and as a clerk at the Lakshmi Insurance Company. During 1928 to 1930, he was a member of the Satyagraha Ashram at Sabarmati. In 1930, Krishnan Nair was selected as a member of the first batch of 90 volunteers for the Dandi March, that later came to be known as the Salt Satyagraha of 1930. After the Dandi March, he stayed at the Wardha ashram(later renamed as Sevagram). In 1942, he participated in the Quit India movement. Since 1943, he served as the Vice-President and Chief Public Relations Officer of the Delhi Pradesh Congress Committee (DPCC) and as its President in 1952.

In 1952, when Delhi became a Part C State of India, Prime Minister Jawaharlal Nehru invited Krishnan Nair to become the first Chief Minister of Delhi as he was the senior leader of DPCC. However, he refused and instead proposed the young leader Chaudhary Brahm Prakash, who was only 34 years old at the time, to become the first chief minister of Delhi.

In independent India, he served as the Member of Parliament (MP) representing Outer Delhi constituency in the First and Second Lok Sabha. During his two terms as MP, he was instrumental in setting up the Delhi Development Authority, and was an active member of various working committees such as for the Delhi Municipal Corporation Bill of 1957 and the Delhi Master Plan 1962.

When the Delhi legislative assembly was abolished in 1956 as per recommendations of the State Reorganisation Commission (SRC), he joined other key personalities of Delhi in strongly criticising the SRC. As the SRC effectively suggested to reduce the autonomy of the national capital to the level of a Municipal Corporation, he expressed his disappointment thus: “But what we expected is a fair deal for Delhi just as every Part C State was added to Part A State, which means greater advantage and greater freedom for people of those areas. It is not so with regard to Delhi.”

As a senior Congress leader, he also mentored juniors such as Prem Singh who rose to take up important roles both in the party and government.

During his active political life in Delhi, he mostly lived in the Gandhi Ashram and the Narela area.

== Death and legacy ==
Krishnan Nair died at RK Puram, New Delhi.

The C.K. Nair Public School near Gandhi Ashram Road in Narela, Delhi is named after C. Krishnan Nair and was established in 1997.
