= Kamal Krishna Das =

Indian politician

Member of Parliament, Lok Sabha
- In office 1952-1962
- Succeeded by: Sisir Kumar Das
- Constituency: Birbhum, West Bengal

Personal details
- Born: 21 January 1921 Calcutta, Bengal Presidency, British India
- Party: Indian National Congress

Kamal Krishna Das is an Indian politician. He was elected from Birbhum, West Bengal to the Lok Sabha, lower house of the Parliament of India as a member of the Indian National Congress.
