= Dwarka Nath Tiwary =

Indian politician (1901–1993)

Dwarka Nath Tiwary (1901 – 29 August 1993) was an Indian politician from Bihar. He was a member of Lok Sabha for four terms from Gopalganj. He participated in Indian independence movement and was imprisoned. Tiwary died on 29 August 1993, at the age of 92.
