= Hubli Assembly constituency =

Hubli Assembly constituency may refer to many constituencies in Karnataka:

- Hubli-Dharwad Central Assembly constituency
- Hubli-Dharwad East Assembly constituency
- Hubli-Dharwad West Assembly constituency
- Hubli City Assembly constituency, a defunct constituency
- Hubli Rural Assembly constituency, a defunct constituency
