= Adavisomapur =

Adavisomapur may refer to places in India:

- Adavisomapur, Gadag, a village in Gadag District in the state of Karnataka
- Adavisomapur, Haveri, a village in Haveri District in the state of Karnataka
