= Dharwad Lok Sabha constituency =

Lok Sabha constituency in Karnataka

Coordinates: 15.5°N 75.0°E

Dharwad
- Lok Sabha constituency
- Lok Sabha Constituency Map

Constituency details
- Country: India
- Region: South India
- State: Karnataka
- Assembly constituencies: Navalgund; Kundgol; Dharwad; Hubli-Dharwad East; Hubli-Dharwad Central; Hubli-Dharwad West; Kalghatgi; Shiggaon
- Established: 2008
- Total electors: 18,91,024
- Reservation: None

Member of Parliament
- 18th Lok Sabha
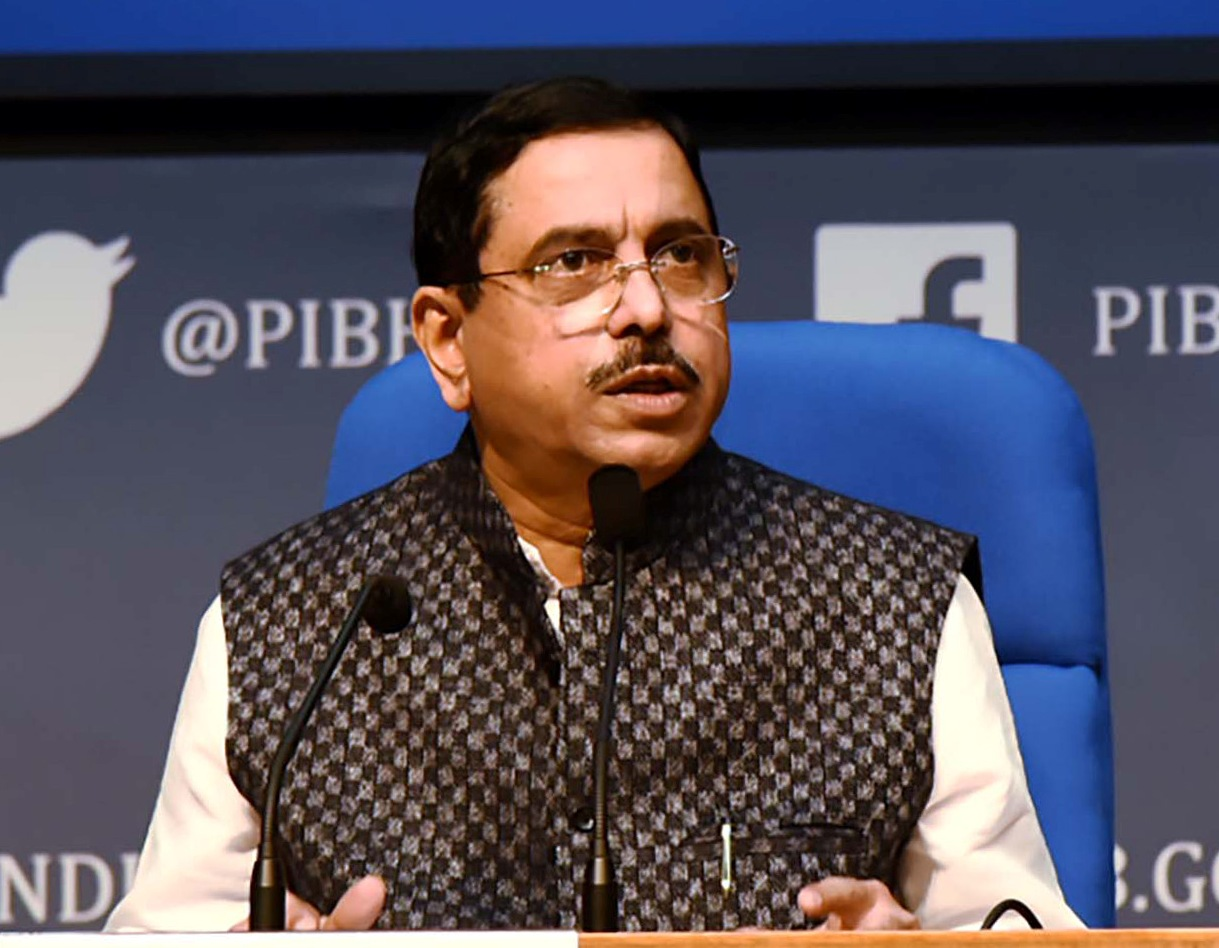
- Incumbent Pralhad Venkatesh Joshi; Union Minister of Education (additional charge); Union Minister of Consumer Affairs, Food, and Public Distribution; Union Minister of New and Renewable Energy
- Party: Bharatiya Janata Party
- Elected year: 2024

Constituency Map

Dharwad Lok Sabha constituency is one of the 28 Lok Sabha (lower house of Indian parliament) constituencies in Karnataka, a state in southern India. This constituency was created as a part of the delimitation of the parliamentary constituencies in 2008, based on the recommendations of the Delimitation Commission of India constituted in 2002. It first held elections in 2009 and its first member of parliament was Pralhad Joshi of the Bharatiya Janata Party (BJP). After winning 2019 general elections Pralhad Joshi was appointed as Minister of Parliamentary Affairs, Minister of Coal, Minister of Mining on 30 May 2019 in cabinet headed by Prime Minister Narendra Modi.

== Assembly segments ==
As of 2014, Dharwad Lok Sabha constituency comprises the following eight Vidhan Sabha (legislative assembly) segments:

No	Name	District	Member	Party	Party Leading (in 2024)
69	Navalgund	Dharwad	N. H. Konaraddi	INC	INC
70	Kundgol	Dharwad	M. R. Patil	BJP	BJP
71	Dharwad	Dharwad	Vacant		BJP
72	Hubli-Dharwad East (SC)	Dharwad	Abbayya Prasad	INC	INC
73	Hubli-Dharwad Central	Dharwad	Mahesh Tenginakai	BJP	BJP
74	Hubli-Dharwad West	Dharwad	Aravind Bellad	BJP	BJP
75	Kalghatgi	Dharwad	Santosh Lad	INC	BJP
83	Shiggaon	Haveri	Yasir Ahmed Khan Pathan	INC	INC

Before delimitation, Navalgund, Dharwad and Kalghatgi Legislative Assembly segments were part of the former Dharwad North constituency and Kundgol and Shiggaon Legislative Assembly segments were part of the former Dharwad South constituency.

== Members of Parliament ==
Year	Member	Party
1952-2008 : See Dharwad North
2004	Pralhad Venkatesh joshi	Bharatiya Janata Party
2009	Pralhad Venkatesh joshi	Bharatiya Janata Party
2014	Pralhad Venkatesh joshi	Bharatiya Janata Party
2019	Pralhad Venkatesh joshi	Bharatiya Janata Party
2024	Pralhad Venkatesh joshi	Bharatiya Janata Party

== Election results ==
=== General Election 2024 ===
2024 Indian general election: Dharwad
Party	Candidate	Votes	%	±%
BJP	Pralhad Venkatesh Joshi	716,231	52.41	▼4.02
INC	Vinod Asooti	6,18,907	45.29	▲4.75
NOTA	None of the above	6,147	0.45	▲0.16
Majority		97,324	7.12	▼9.77
Turnout		13,66,570	74.51	▲4.22
BJP hold		Swing		

=== 2019 ===
2019 Indian general election: Dharwad
Party	Candidate	Votes	%	±%
BJP	Pralhad Joshi	684,837	56.43	+4.24
INC	Vinay Kulkarni	479,765	39.54	−1.92
BSP	Irappa Bharamappa Madar	6,344	0.52	−0.14
IND	Somashekhar Peeraji Yadav	5,400	0.44	N/A
NOTA	None of the above	3,512	0.29	−0.95
Margin of victory		2,05,072	16.89	+6.16
Turnout		1,214,138	70.29	+4.29
BJP hold		Swing	+4.24	

=== General election 2014 ===
2014 Indian general election: Dharwad
Party	Candidate	Votes	%	±%
BJP	Pralhad Joshi	543,395	52.19	−3.78
INC	Vinay Kulkarni	431,738	41.46	+2.73
NOTA	None of the above	12,937	1.24	N/A
JD(S)	Banakapur Hanumanthappa Mallappa	8,836	0.85	N/A
BSP	Irappa Bharamappa Madar	6,858	0.66	−0.09
Margin of victory		111,657	10.73	−6.51
Turnout		1,041,470	65.99	+9.44
BJP hold		Swing		

=== General election 2009 ===
2009 Indian general election: Dharwad
Party	Candidate	Votes	%	±%
BJP	Pralhad Joshi	446,786	55.97	
INC	Manjunath Kunnur	309,123	38.73	
NCP	Mahesh Gurupadayya Talakallamath	7,176	0.90	
IND	Shankarappa G. Yadavannavar	6,502	0.81	
BSP	Kashimsab Mulla	5,981	0.75	
Margin of victory		137,663	17.24	
Turnout		798,214	56.55	
BJP win (new seat)				

== See also ==
- Dharwad North Lok Sabha constituency
- Dharwad South Lok Sabha constituency
- Dharwad district
- List of constituencies of the Lok Sabha
