= Manjunath Kunnur =

Indian politician

MP
- In office 2004–2009
- Preceded by: I.G. Sanadi
- Succeeded by: Seat disestablished
- Constituency: Dharwad South

MLA
- In office 1989–1999
- Preceded by: Neelakanthagouda Veeranagouda Patil
- Succeeded by: Syed Azeempeer Khadri
- Constituency: Shiggaon

Personal details
- Born: 2 December 1954 (age 71) Dharwad, Karnataka
- Party: Independent (2024-present)
- Other political affiliations: Indian National Congress (1989-2004, 2009-2018,2023-2024), Bharatiya Janata Party (2004-2009,2018-2023)
- Spouse: Snehalata
- Children: 2 sons and 1 daughter
- As of 23 September, 2006

Manjunath Kunnur (born 2 December 1954) was a member of the 14th Lok Sabha of India. He represented the Dharwad South constituency of Karnataka and was a member of the Bharatiya Janata Party (BJP) political party. He joined Indian National Congress and unsuccessfully contested 2009 Indian general election from Dharwad against Pralhad Joshi.

== Education ==
Manjunath Kunnur completed his B.Sc., LL.B. (Spl.) from University Law College, Dharwad.
