= Narasimharaja =

Narasimharaja is a locality in Mysore. It hosts one of the constituencies of Karnataka State Legislative Assembly.

Elections were first held here for this seat in 1967.

Tanveer Sait is from the Indian National Congress and represents Narasimharaja constituency of Mysore, Karnataka. The constituency has been served by the Sait's family for over three decades, Sait's father Aziz Sait was a veteran congress leader and held the Narasimharaja Assembly seat six times from 1967 to 1999. After the demise of Aziz Sait in December 2001 his political legacy the Narasimharaja assembly seat led to a family feud in the Sait family as Tariq Sait grandson of Aziz Sait and nephew of Tanveer Sait campaigned for the Janata Dal (Secular) candidate Maruthi Rao Pawar in the 2002 Karnataka assembly election against his uncle Tanveer Sait. In the 2002 By-election Sait won the Narasimharaja Assembly seat by above 10,000 votes against Maruthi Rao Pawar from the Janata Dal (Secular). In the following election of 2004 Sait won the assembly seat by above 20,000 against Maruthi Rao Pawar from the Janata Dal (Secular).In the 2008 assembly election Sait beat S.Nagaraju (Sandesh) of the Janata Dal (Secular) by about 6000 vote. Tanveer Sait is the sitting member of the Karnataka Legislative Assembly from Narasimharaja constituency as he retained the seat again in the 2013 assembly election winning against Abdul Majeed K H of the Social Democratic Party of India by about 8370 votes. Sait won the 2018 Karnataka Legislative Assembly election from the Narasimharaja constituency defeating the Bharatiya Janata Party candidate by about 18127 votes.

== See also ==
Narasimharaja (Vidhan Sabha constituency)
