= B. M. Mujahid =

Indian politician

Member of the Indian Parliament for Dharwad South
- In office 2 December 1989 – 10 May 1996
- Preceded by: Azeez Sait
- Succeeded by: I. G. Sanadi
- Constituency: Dharwad South

Personal details
- Party: Indian National Congress

B. M. Mujahid was an Indian politician belonging to the Indian National Congress (INC) political party. He served as a Member of Parliament representing the Dharwad South constituency in Karnataka during the 9th and 10th Lok Sabha sessions.

== Political career ==
Mujahid actively entered national politics during the late 1980s as a member of the Indian National Congress.

=== 1989 general election ===
In the 1989 Indian general election, Mujahid was selected by the INC to contest from the Dharwad South parliamentary seat, succeeding the veteran leader Azeez Sait. He won the election and was sworn in as a member of the 9th Lok Sabha, serving from 1989 until the house was dissolved in 1991.

=== 1991 general election ===
Following the mid-term dissolution of parliament, he successfully retained his seat in the 1991 Indian general election. He defeated his regional opponents to secure a second consecutive term in the 10th Lok Sabha, completing a full five-year tenure that ended in 1996.

He was later succeeded by I. G. Sanadi, also of the Indian National Congress, ahead of the 1996 general elections.

== See also ==
- Dharwad South Lok Sabha constituency
- List of members of the 9th Lok Sabha
- List of members of the 10th Lok Sabha
