= Basavaraj Bommai =

23rd Chief Minister of Karnataka from 2021 to 2023

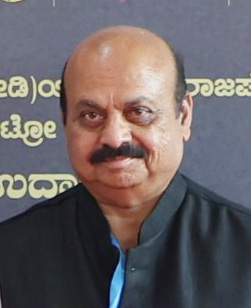
- Bommai in 2023

Member of Parliament, Lok Sabha
- Incumbent
- Assumed office 4 June 2024
- Preceded by: Shivkumar Udasi
- Constituency: Haveri, Karnataka

Acting Leader of Opposition in Karnataka Legislative Assembly
- In office 20 May 2023 – 17 November 2023
- Chief Minister: Siddaramaiah
- Preceded by: Siddaramaiah
- Succeeded by: R. Ashoka

17th Chief Minister of Karnataka
- In office 28 July 2021 – 20 May 2023
- Governor: Thawar Chand Gehlot
- Preceded by: B. S. Yediyurappa
- Succeeded by: Siddaramaiah

Minister of Law & Legislative Affairs of Karnataka
- In office 21 January 2021 – 26 July 2021
- Chief Minister: B. S. Yediyurappa
- Preceded by: J. C. Madhuswamy
- Succeeded by: J. C. Madhuswamy

Minister of Home Affairs of Karnataka
- In office 20 August 2019 – 26 July 2021
- Chief Minister: B. S. Yediyurappa
- Preceded by: M. B. Patil
- Succeeded by: Araga Jnanendra

Minister of Cooperation of Karnataka
- In office 27 September 2019 – 10 February 2020
- Chief Minister: B. S. Yediyurappa
- Preceded by: Bandeppa Kashempur
- Succeeded by: S. T. Somashekhar

Minister of Major & Medium Irrigation of Karnataka
- In office 7 June 2008 – 13 May 2013
- Chief Minister: B. S. Yediyurappa; Sadananda Gowda; Jagadish Shettar
- Preceded by: K. S. Eshwarappa
- Succeeded by: M. B. Patil

Member of Karnataka Legislative Assembly
- In office 25 May 2008 – 15 June 2024
- Preceded by: Sindhura Rajashekhar
- Succeeded by: Yasir Ahmed Khan Pathan
- Constituency: Shiggaon
- In office 6 January 1998 – 17 April 2008
- Succeeded by: Shivaraj Sajjanar
- Constituency: Dharwad Local Authorities

Personal details
- Born: 28 January 1960 (age 66) Hubli, Mysore State, India (present-day Hubballi, Karnataka)
- Party: Bharatiya Janata Party (since 2008)
- Other political affiliations: Janata Dal (United) (2004–2008); Janata Dal (1992–2004)
- Spouse: Chennamma
- Children: 2 (including Bharath Basavaraja Bommai)
- Parent: S. R. Bommai (father)
- Education: B.E
- Alma mater: KLE Technological University
- Cabinet: Basavaraj Bommai ministry

Basavaraj Somappa Bommai // (born 28 January 1960) is an Indian politician and engineer who is currently serving as the Lok Sabha MP of Haveri and previously served as the 17th Chief Minister of Karnataka from 18 July 2021 to 19 May 2023. He formerly served as the Interim Leader of the Opposition in Karnataka Legislative Assembly as a member of the Bharatiya Janata Party and he was former member of the Janata Dal and Janata Dal (United). He was a Member of the Legislative Assembly in the legislature of Karnataka for Shiggaon, from where he has been elected four times since 2008. Between 1998 and 2008, he was a member of the Karnataka Legislative Council from Dharwad local authorities. He served as Minister for Water Resources and major and medium irrigation from 2008 to 2013, Home Affairs, Law and Parliamentary Affairs and Cooperation between 2019 and 2021 minister in charge of Haveri and Udupi districts from 2019 to 2021.

In July 2022, Bommai became only the second person from BJP to complete one year as chief minister of the state. During his tenure he was called the "Common Man − CM" by the media and his followers. Bommai is the son of the former Chief Minister of Karnataka and Union Minister of Human Resource Development, S. R. Bommai, who is widely remembered as the champion for the landmark judgment of the Supreme Court of India, S. R. Bommai v. Union of India, considered one of the most quoted verdicts in the country's political history. Basavaraj Bommai and his father are the second father and son duo after H. D. Devegowda and H. D. Kumaraswamy to become the Chief Ministers of Karnataka, a testament to prevalent nepotism in politics. In March 2024, he was announced as the BJP candidate for the Haveri Lok Sabha constituency in the 2024 General Elections.

== Personal life ==
Bommai was born on 28 January 1960 to former Chief Minister S. R. Bommai and his wife Gangamma Bommai in Hubli, Mysore State (present-day Karnataka). Bommai is a Mechanical Engineering graduate from KLE Technological University, and started his career with Tata Motors in Pune. He is also an agriculturist and industrialist by profession. He is married to Chennamma and has two children. He belongs to Sadar Lingayat community.

== Early political career ==
BS Bommai started his political career as a member of the Janata Dal in 1992. While in Janata Dal, he worked with senior politicians of the Janata Dal like H. D. Deve Gowda and Ramakrishna Hegde. He later also served as a political secretary to then Chief Minister J. H. Patel.

Bommai contested the 1994 Karnataka legislative assembly elections from Hubli Rural constituency as a member of the Janata Dal. However, he lost the election to Jagadish Shettar of the Bharatiya Janata Party.

Bommai was elected as a member of the Karnataka Legislative Council in 1998 from Dharwad local authorities constituency as a member Janata Dal. After the dissolution of the Janata Dal, he joined the Janata Dal (United). Later in 2004, he was re-elected from Dharwad local authorities constituency as a member Janata Dal (United).

He quit the Janata Dal (United) in February 2008 and later joined the Bharatiya Janata Party in the same month of the year.

== Rise in state politics ==
In the 2008 Karnataka state elections, he was elected to the Karnataka Legislative Assembly from Shiggaon constituency in Haveri district. He was considered as a close aide of the then Chief Minister B. S. Yediyurappa.

=== Cabinet minister of Karnataka ===
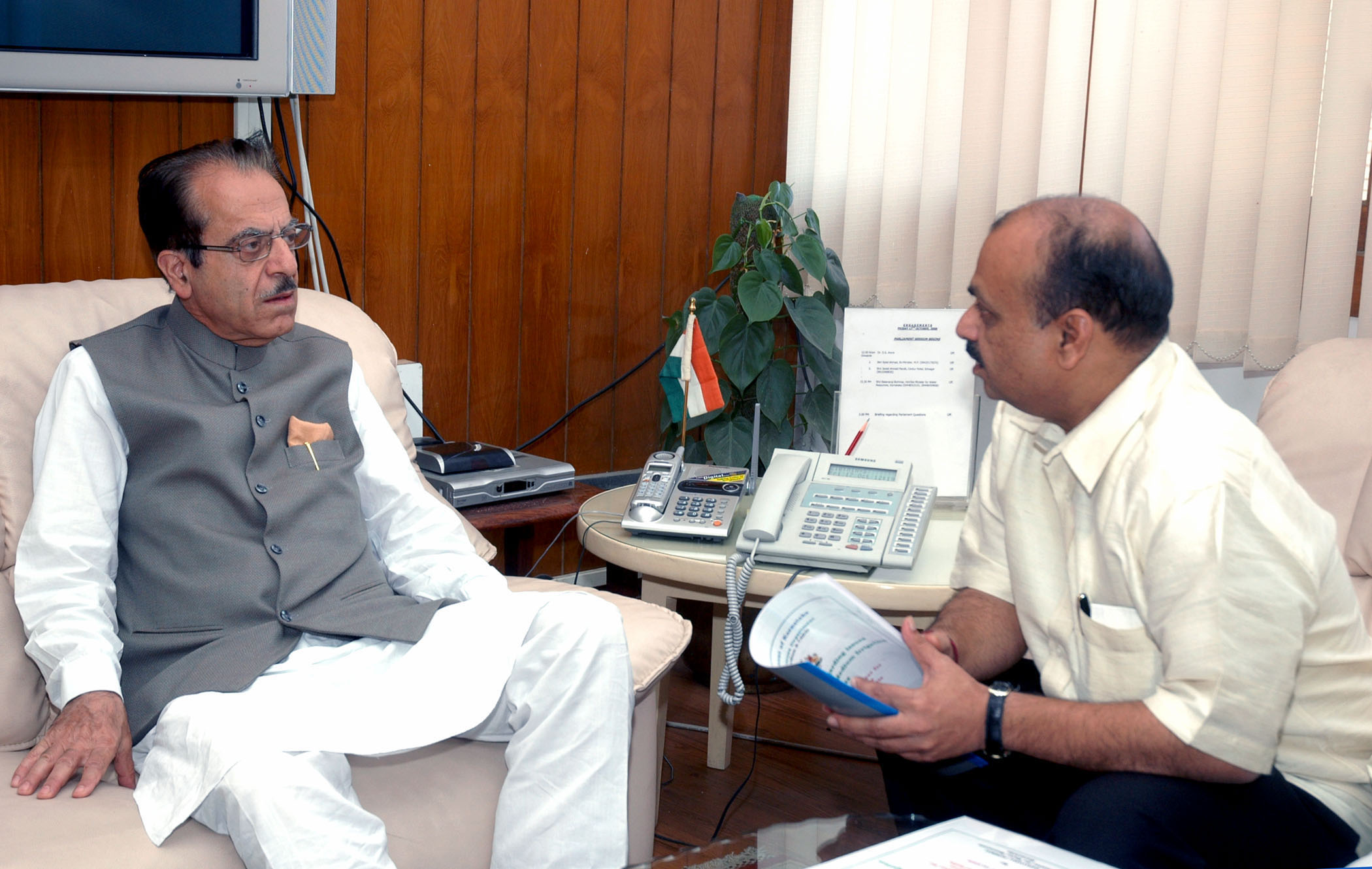
Karnataka Minister for Water Resources, Shri Basavaraj Bommai called on the Union Minister for Water Resources, Prof. Saifuddin Soz, in New Delhi on October 17, 2008

In February 2008, he left Janata Dal (United) and joined Bharatiya Janata Party. The same year he was elected to Karnataka Legislative Assembly from Shiggaon constituency. Between 2008 and 2013 Bommai served as Minister for Water Resources under Chief Ministers B. S. Yediyurappa, Sadananda Gowda and Jagadish Shettar.

Bommai is widely acclaimed for his contributions to irrigation schemes and deep knowledge regarding irrigation matters in Karnataka. He is also credited with implementing India's first 100% piped irrigation project at Shiggaon in Haveri district of Karnataka.

In the Fourth Yediyurappa ministry he held key ministerial portfolios, serving as Minister of State for Home Affairs, Law and Parliamentary Affairs and as Minister for Cooperation. He also served as Minister in charge of Haveri and Udupi districts.

In December 2019, a protest against the Citizenship Amendment Act in Mangalore turned into violence and riots when a mob of protesters attempted to lay siege to the Mangalore North police station and tried to attack cops. Section 144 was imposed by the Police department around the areas of the riots. Later two people were killed in Mangalore in police firing after protests against the Citizenship Amendment Act turned too violent. The Home Minister Bommai set-up a team and ordered probe into this matter. Over 60 people were identified and detained by the cops after the December 19th violence. The Karnataka government also suspended mobile Internet services in Dakshina Kannada district in Mangaluru for few hours in the wake of violence.

After the 2020 Bangalore riots, then Home Minister Bommai ordered a detailed investigation and assured compensation for damaged property be forcibly provided by known participants in the riots, a policy proposed by Yogi Adityanath-led Uttar Pradesh following anti-CAA protests there.

During the second wave of the COVID-19 pandemic in Karnataka, Bommai, as Home Minister, imposed strict lockdown regulations. Bommai converted his residence at Shiggaon in Haveri district into a Covid Care Centre that could accommodate up to 50 patients, to reduce the burden on the Shiggaon taluk hospital. He also appointed doctors and medical staff to take care of the patients along with oxygen concentrators.

== Chief Minister of Karnataka ==
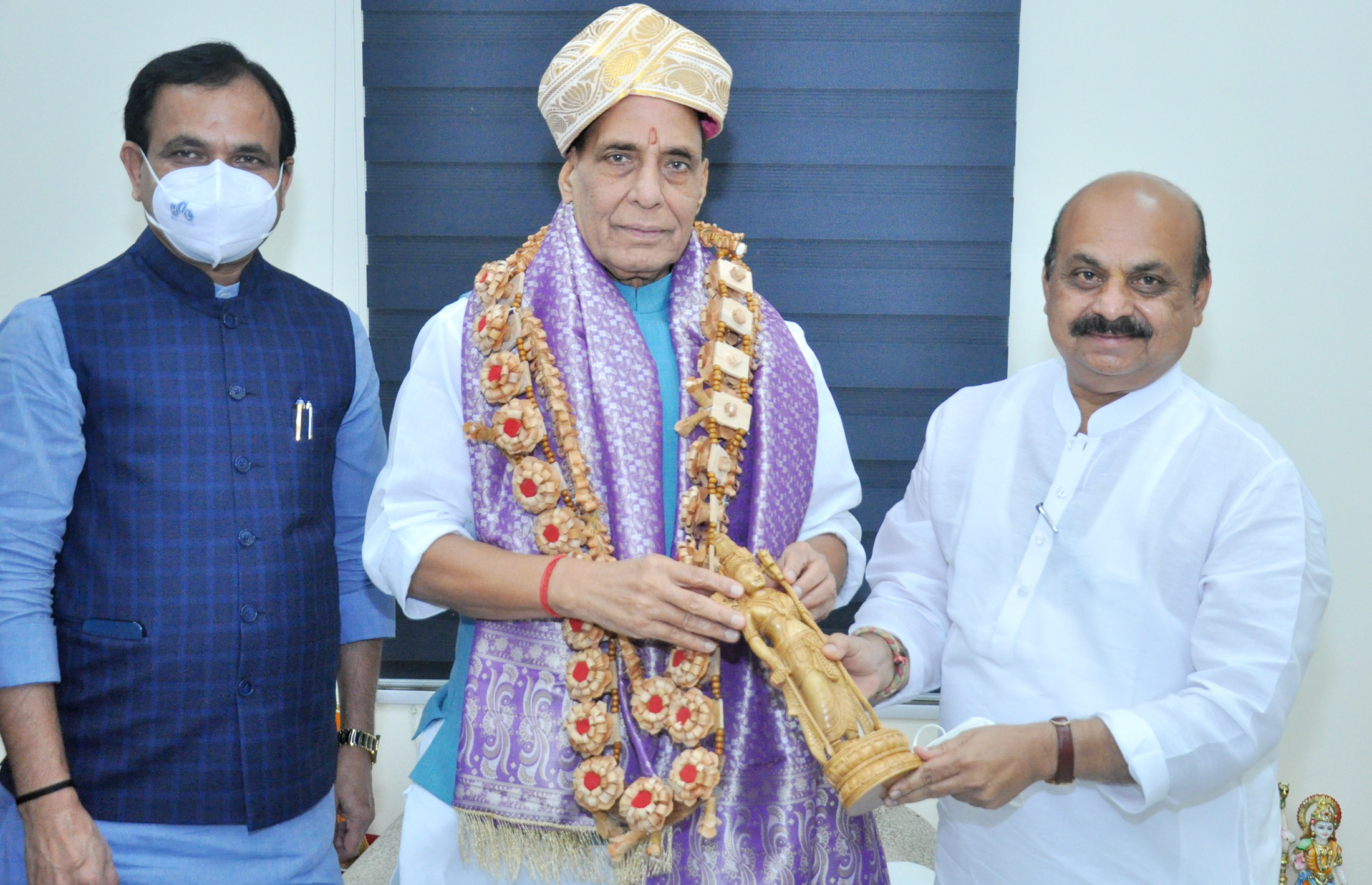
Chief Minister Basavarj Bommai, meets the Union Defence Minister Rajnath Singh and Minister of State New & Renewable Energy & Chemicals and Fertilizers Bhagwanth Khuba in New Delhi.

B. S. Yediyurappa resigned as Chief Minister on 26 July 2021, on the second anniversary of his term. Dharmendra Pradhan and G. Kishan Reddy were sent by the national leadership of the BJP to carry out the selection of the next chief minister. On 27 July 2021, Bommai was elected to the post. He was sworn in the next day as the 23rd Chief Minister of Karnataka, becoming the fourth chief minister from the Bharatiya Janata Party in the state. On his very first day as the Chief Minister, after the cabinet meet he announced scholarships for higher education to farmers' children. He also increased the pensions of widows, physically challenged and senior citizens of the state.

In August 2021, under Basavaraj Bommai's administration Karnataka became the first state in the country to implement the National Education Policy 2020.

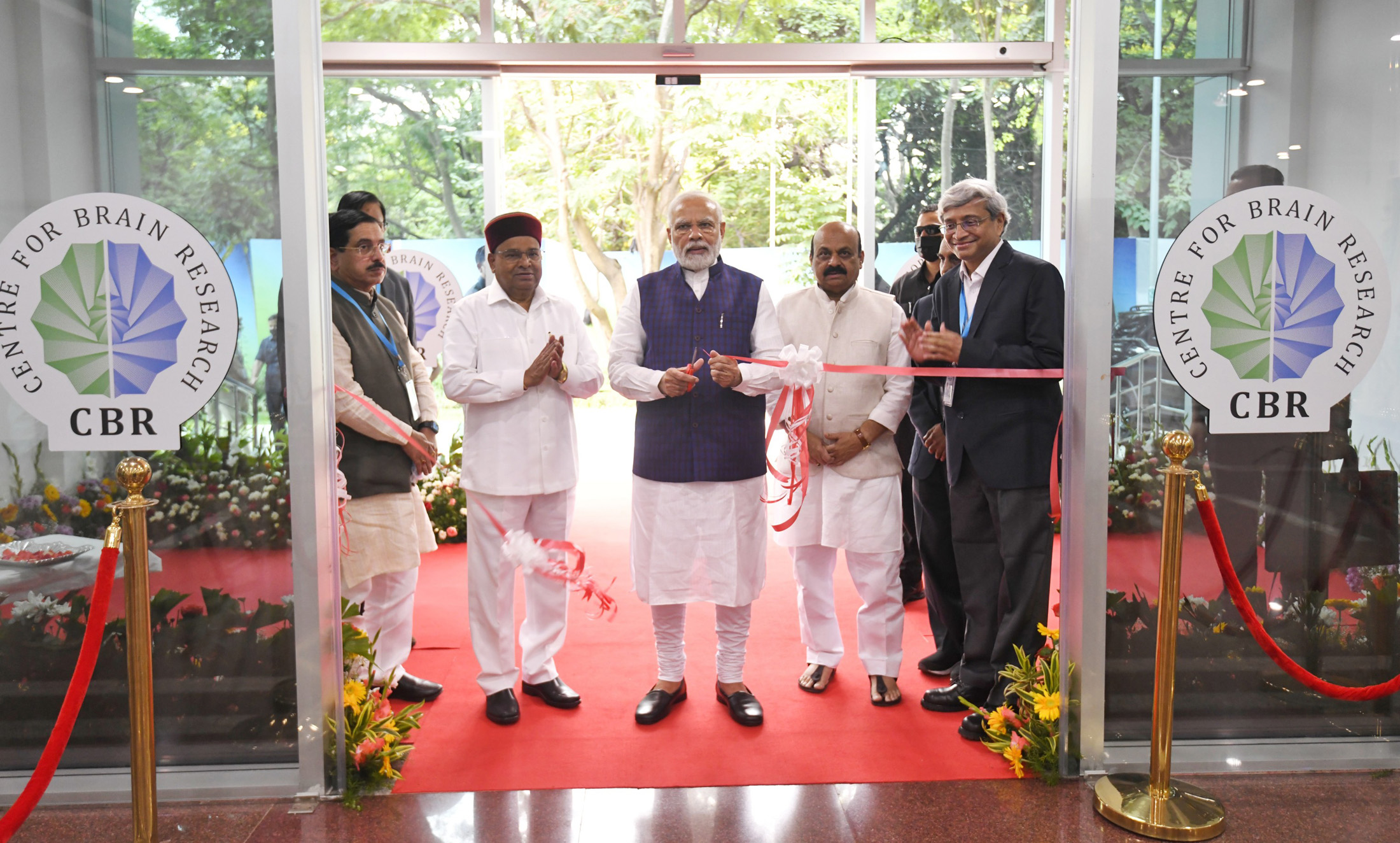
Bommai, with Prime Minister Modi during his visit to Bengaluru in June 2022

In September 2021, Basavaraj Bommai's administration faced criticism over the demolition of local temples that were not approved by the government, following a Supreme Court order. Due to public outcry, he ordered a halt on the demolition of temples.

Bommai revived Pratibimba − the Chief Minister's Dashboard, an online portal to review developmental works designed in line with that of Prime Minister's Office in October 2021.

Bommai's government passed the Anti-Conversion bill (The Karnataka Right to Freedom of Religion Bill) in December 2021, which prohibits forcible conversion of religion from one to another, by fraud, allurement or marriage. The bill provided some exemption if one needed to re-convert back to his/her immediate previous religion. The oppositions staged various protests condemning this bill, both in the floor of the house and in various places around the streets.

Bommai presented his maiden Karnataka state budget with an outlay of 2.6 lakh crores in March 2022. The main highlights included flow of money of around 30,000 crores for construction of fly-overs, under-pass, highways, Namma Metro and hospitals in Bangalore; 11,500 crores to inland transport; 9,500 crores to the development of Mekedatu project, Upper Krishna Project, Upper Bhadra River and Arkavathi River projects.

In May 2022, Bommai visited the World Economic Forum at Davos, Switzerland to bring in investments to the state. His main concerns was to attract the investors to the Global Investors meet held in Bangalore during the time of November. Bommai stated that he has inked MOUs with LuLu Group International and ReNew Power companies for Rs 52,000 crores investments over the next seven years.

In October 2022, Bommai and former chief minister B S Yediyurappa launched the 'Jan Sankalp Yatra', party's travel across the state starting from the district of Raichur. It was termed to be started to counter the opposition's 'Bharat Jodo Yatra' going around in the state.

In November 2022, Bommai's government inaugurated "The Statue of Prosperity" − a 108 feet tall statue of the city founder Kempe Gowda in Kempegowda International Airport of Bangalore, in the presence of Prime Minister of India Narendra Modi and other delegates. This statue entered the World Book of records as the World's tallest bronze statue of a city founder.

In February 2023, Bommai along with Prime Minister Narendra Modi, inaugurated Asia's largest helicopter manufacturing facility, HAL in Gubbi taluk of Tumkur. The facility has production, testing and deployment infrastructure facilities spread over an area of 615 acres of land. This organisation is said to boost the employments in the state and also strengthen the defense sector in the country.

In March 2023, his government passed the controversial Factories (Karnataka Amendment) Act, 2023 increasing work hours limit from 9 to 12 in a day in factories, allowing night shift for women and set the maximum work hours at 48 per week. Allowable overtime hours were also increased from 75 to 145 for three month period. The government also reduced minimum wages in the dyeing, printing, silk and textile industries. Bahutva Karnataka, a coalition of progressive organisations, accused the government of introducing laws to deny basic rights to workers.

In the same month, his government inaugurated the "Bengaluru − Mysuru 10 lane Highway" in the presence of Prime Minister Narendra Modi, that also connected Ramanagara, Channapatna, Mandya, Maddur and other parts along the way. This project was said to reduce time of travel from 3 hours to 75 minutes and also conserve energy usage.

In the last cabinet meeting held by the end of March 2023, Bommai's government announced significant changes regarding the reservation for castes in government jobs and education. The 4% OBC quota provided to Muslims under 2B, were scrapped and moved to 10% reservation under the Economically Weaker Sections. The same were extended to Vokkaligas and Lingayats under new categories of 2C and 2D. This also led to protests by various communities across parts of the states and also faced opposition from other parties and organizations.

=== Challenges ===
Bommai's government was accused by various Christian groups for the 2021 anti-Christian violence in Karnataka, following the implementation of his Karnataka Protection of Right to Freedom of Religion Act or the anti-conversion law by his government.

The Archbishop of Bengaluru, Most Rev. Peter Machado accused the Chief Minister for providing tacit sanction to vigilantes to extend targeted attacks on minorities, particular Christian communities in Karnataka.

In February 2022, a controversy over hijabs in educational institutions started in Udupi, followed by various protests in the state. Bommai's Government issued an order stating that the uniforms mandated by the state government, the school managements or college development committees must be worn compulsorily. Further on 15 March, the High Court of Karnataka upheld the government's decision of not allowing any religious symbols and to follow the rules of uniformity, in educational institutions.

The Karnataka PSI Scam, which is an entrance exam to fill 545 vacant seats of police sub-inspector post, was conducted in October 2021. Suspicions arose about some candidates allegedly using fraudulent means to score well in the exam. And these malpractices were supported by various higher officials, police officers and recruitment officials who were allegedly bribed with money. This included the allotment of seats, ranks and positions to those students who brought in money. This led to a political storm, and a CID enquiry was instigated. Various political leaders from all parties, IPS and IAS officers and DCs were held in custody with the enquiry subsiding on.

A contractor named Santhosh, committed suicide allegedly stating that he was harassed by the cabinet minister K. S. Eshwarappa, to provide him 40% commission of the grants provided for various construction and development projects. This led to various protests across the state by the opposition demanding the resignation of the minister. Bommai received his resignation couple days later, and initiated a CID enquiry into the issue. The opposition branded the cabinet as "40% government". However Eshwarappa was provided a clean chit, at the end of the trial by the investigative agencies.

The state was throbbed with series of killings in coastal Karnataka in July 2022. The Murder of a BJP worker Praveen Nettaru led to fierce protests across the state against the government, and led to resignation of thousands of members from the party. Muslim bodies slammed Bommai for his partial treatment in the serial killing in the district of Dakshina Kannada, as his compensation for the Hindu Victim was different and Muslim Victim was different plus the agencies handling the cases were different.

The opposition parties shared and published a scannable 'PayCM' posters, with Bommai's face on it. These posters were stuck on walls of streets and the government was accused of corruptions, commissions and briberies, once the QR codes on the posters were scanned. The BJP called it cheap politics, and cases were filed against members of Congress, for sticking up of posters in public places, which is prohibited in the state.

According to the National Family Health Survey 5 (NFHS-5) for the year 2019–21, 35% children were stunted and 33% were overweight due to food security schemes not being properly implemented and communal groups disrupting access to nutrition. Environment conservation was another challenge as depletion threats are looming on many rivers like Arkavathy, Vrishabhavathi, and Pinakini.

=== 2023 Assembly elections ===
In the 2023 Karnataka Legislative Elections, as the chief minister he won from the Shiggaon constituency by a margin of 33,000 votes. However, his party lost the majority in the assembly and Bommai conceded his party's defeat and stated "BJP has not been able to make the mark" and said would come back stronger in the successive Lok Sabha elections. He tendered his resignation as the chief minister of the state to the Governor Thawar Chand Gehlot on 13 May 2023 and served as a caretaker chief minister until the next government was formed.

== 2024 Lok Sabha Elections ==
He won as the BJP candidate from the Haveri Loksabha constituency in the 2024 General Elections.

== Elections Contested ==
=== Karnataka Legislative Assembly ===
Year	Constituency	Party	Votes	%	Opponent	Opponent Party	Opponent Votes	%	Result	Margin	%
2023	Shiggaon	BJP	100,016	54.95	Yasir Ahmed Khan Pathan	INC	64,038	35.18	Won	35,978	19.77
2018	Shiggaon	BJP	83,868	49.02	Syed Azeempeer Khadri	INC	74,603	43.69	Won	9,265	5.45
2013	Shiggaon	BJP	73,007	48.64	Syed Azeempeer Khadri	INC	63,504	42.31	Won	9,503	6.33
2008	Shiggaon	BJP	63,780	51.76	Syed Azeempeer Khadri	INC	50,918	41.32	Won	12,862	10.44

=== Lok Sabha ===
Year	Constituency	Party	Votes	%	Opponent	Opponent Party	Opponent Votes	%	Result	Margin	%
2024	Haveri	BJP	705,538	50.55	Anandswamy Gaddadevarmath	INC	662,025	47.43	Won	43,513	3.12

== See also ==
- S. R. Bommai
- Basavaraj Bommai ministry
