= Konankeri =

Coordinates: 14°57′N 75°08′E

- Village
- Interactive map of Konankeri
- Country: India
- State: Karnataka
- District: Haveri
- Talukas: Shiggaon

Languages
  - Official: Kannada
- Time zone: UTC+5:30 (IST)

Konankeri ( Kannada: ಕೋಣನಕೇರಿ, romanized: Konankeri) is a village in Haveri district in Karnataka, India. Konankeri being the central spot where three roads meet and is an important brick-manufacturing village.
