= Hulgur =

- village
- Location in Karnataka, India Hulgur (India)
- Coordinates: 15°05′N 75°17′E
- Country: India
- State: Karnataka
- District: Haveri
- Talukas: Shiggaon

Population (2001)
  - Total: 8,092

Languages
  - Official: Kannada
- Time zone: UTC+5:30 (IST)

Hulgur is a village in the southern state of Karnataka, India. It is located in the Shiggaon taluk of Haveri district in Karnataka.

== Demographics ==
As of 2001 India census, Hulgur had a population of 8092 with 4094 males and 3998 females.

== See also ==
- Haveri
- Districts of Karnataka
