= Adavisomapur, Haveri =

Adavisomapur
- village
- Interactive map of Adavisomapur
- Coordinates: 15.0900°N 75.1404°E
- Country: India
- State: Karnataka
- District: Haveri
- Talukas: Shiggaon

Government
  - Body: Village Panchayat

Languages
  - Official: Kannada
- Time zone: UTC+5:30 (IST)
- Nearest city: Haveri
- Civic agency: Village Panchayat

Adavisomapur is a village in the southern state of Karnataka, India. It is located in the Shiggaon taluk of Haveri district in Karnataka.

== See also ==
- Haveri
- Districts of Karnataka
