= Dharwad South Lok Sabha constituency =

Former constituency of the Indian parliament in Karnataka

Coordinates: 15.2°N 75.1°E

Dharwad South
- Former Lok Sabha constituency

Constituency details
- Country: India
- Region: South India
- State: Karnataka
- Established: 1952
- Abolished: 2009
- Reservation: None

Dharwad South Lok Sabha constituency was a former Lok Sabha (parliamentary) constituency in Karnataka state in southern India. With the implementation of the delimitation of parliamentary constituencies in 2008, it ceased to exist.

== Assembly segments ==
Dharwad South Lok Sabha constituency comprised the following eight Legislative Assembly segments:

1. Kundgol
2. Shiggaon
3. Hanagal
4. Hirekerur
5. Ranibennur
6. Byadgi
7. Haveri
8. Shirhatti

== Members of Parliament ==
Year	Member	Party
1952	Thimmappa Rudrappa Newsi	Indian National Congress
1957	Thimmappa Rudrappa Newsi	Indian National Congress
1962	Fakruddinsab Hussensab Mohsin	Indian National Congress
1967	Fakruddinsab Hussensab Mohsin	Indian National Congress
1971	Fakruddinsab Hussensab Mohsin	Indian National Congress
1977	Fakruddinsab Hussensab Mohsin	Indian National Congress
1980	Fakruddinsab Hussensab Mohsin	Indian National Congress
1984	Azeez Sait	Indian National Congress
1989	B. M. Mujahid	Indian National Congress
1991	B. M. Mujahid	Indian National Congress
1996	I.G. Sanadi	Indian National Congress
1998	B. M. Menasinakai	Lok Shakti
1999	I.G. Sanadi	Indian National Congress
2004	Manjunath Kunnur	Bharatiya Janata Party

- From 2008 onwards:Constituency does not exist
- See Dharwad Lok Sabha constituency and Haveri Lok Sabha constituency

== Detailed Results ==
Vote share of Winning candidates
2004	51.20%
1999	46.24%
1998	46.61%
1996	32.48%
1991	46.72%
1989	51.16%
1984	53.14%
1980	61.00%
1977	60.66%
1971	69.00%
1967	50.28%
1962	63.92%
1957	68.70%
1951	60.27%

=== 2004 ===
2004 Indian general election: Dharwad South
Party	Candidate	Votes	%	±%
BJP	Manjunath Kunnur	442,759	51.20	
INC	I.G. Sanadi	297,647	34.42	
JD(S)	Prema Sanganabasanagouda Patil	76,555	8.85	
IND	Hosamani Mohamed Haneef Meerasab	23,620	2.73	
KNDP	Patil Shiddanagouda Siddalingappa Gouda	12,339	1.43	
BSP	Dr. Syed Roshan Mulla	11,890	1.37	
Majority		145,112	16.78	
Turnout				
Swing to BJP from INC		Swing		

=== 1999 ===
1999 Indian general election: Dharwad South
Party	Candidate	Votes	%	±%
INC	Prof. I. G. Sanadi	355,523	46.24	
JD(U)	B. M. Menasinkai	316,325	41.15	
JD(S)	N. Basavaraj	96,943	12.61	
Majority		39,198	5.09	
Turnout		799,552	73.47	
Swing to INC from Lok Shakti		Swing		

=== 1998 ===
1998 Indian general election: Dharwad South
Party	Candidate	Votes	%	±%
Lok Shakti	B. M. Menasinakai	328,333	46.61	
INC	Prof. I. G. Sanadi	241,371	34.27	
JD	Shivannanavar Basavaraj Neelappa	126,722	17.99	
KTVP	Dr. Mohan Hande	7,998	1.14	
Majority		86,962	12.34	
Turnout		718,159	67.65	
Swing to Lok Shakti from INC		Swing		

=== 1996 ===
1996 Indian general election: Dharwad South
Party	Candidate	Votes	%	±%
INC	I. G. Sanadi	196,677	32.48	
JD	B. M. Menshinkai	187,068	30.89	
BJP	B. G. Banakar	185,789	30.68	
KCP (Note: Karnataka Congress Party)	C. M. Hulgur	16,136	2.66	
IND	12 Independent Candidates	19,903	3.29	
Majority		9,609	1.59	
Turnout		622,321	59.80	
INC hold		Swing		

=== 1991 ===
1991 Indian general election: Dharwad South
Party	Candidate	Votes	%	±%
INC	B. M. Mujahid	231,473	46.72	
BJP	B. G. Banakar	157,702	31.83	
JD	B. G. Patil	78,844	15.91	
IND	22 Independent Candidates	22,971	4.63	
OTH	3 Other Party Candidates	4,453	0.90	
Majority		73,771	14.89	
Turnout		510,423	54.21	
INC hold		Swing		

=== 1989 ===
1989 Indian general election: Dharwad South
Party	Candidate	Votes	%	±%
INC	B. M. Mujahid	339,235	51.16	
JD	B. G. Banakar	310,587	46.84	
JP	Humbarawadi Nagappa Shivalingappa	8,797	1.33	
IND	Olakar Shantappa Hanumantappa	2,889	0.44	
IND	Nisarahmed S. Moulvi	1,621	0.24	
Majority		28,648	4.32	
Turnout		691,607	73.73	
INC hold		Swing		

=== 1984 ===
1984 Indian general election: Dharwad South
Party	Candidate	Votes	%	±%
INC	Azeez Sait	257,834	53.14	
JP	Abdul Nairsab	200,227	41.27	
IND	13 Independent Candidates	27,142	5.60	
Majority		57,607	11.87	
Turnout		500,375	71.39	
INC hold		Swing		

=== 1980 ===
1980 Indian general election: Dharwad South
Party	Candidate	Votes	%	±%
INC(I)	Mohsin Fakruddinsab Hussensab	226,083	61.00	
INC(U)	Banakar Basavannappa Gadlappa	75,050	20.25	
JP	Shankrikoppa Mahalingappa Shivalingappa	61,584	16.62	
IND	Mathad Gurushantaiah Panchaiah	3,026	0.82	
IND	Jain Hirachand Kesarimal	1,870	0.50	
IND	Meherwade Shabhusa Laxmansa	1,673	0.45	
IND	Kotrabasappa Sahantavva Talwar	1,352	0.36	
Majority		151,033	40.75	
Turnout		384,924	56.87	
INC(I) hold		Swing		

=== 1977 ===
1977 Indian general election: Dharwad South
Party	Candidate	Votes	%	±%
INC	Mohsin F. H.	239,210	60.66	
JP	C. M. Ibrahim	147,270	37.35	
IND	Goudappa Gouda Shivanagouda Patil	7,834	1.99	
Majority		91,940	23.31	
Turnout		407,647	70.80	
INC hold		Swing		

=== 1971 ===
1971 Indian general election: Dharwar South
Party	Candidate	Votes	%	±%
INC	Mohsin Fakruddin Husensab	197,901	69.00	
INC(O)	Mamle-Desai Revansiddhappa Bullappa	83,959	29.27	
IND	Bhanappagouda Shivanagouda Patil	4,943	1.72	
Majority		113,942	39.73	
Turnout		297,573	62.04	
INC hold		Swing		

=== 1967 ===
1967 Indian general election: Dharwar South
Party	Candidate	Votes	%	±%
INC	M. F. Hussensab	147,272	50.28	
PSP	C. A. Rahim	82,641	28.21	
IND	K. S. Patil	62,994	21.51	
Majority		64,631	22.07	
Turnout		307,737	65.29	
INC hold		Swing		

=== 1962 ===
1962 Indian general election: Dharwar South
Party	Candidate	Votes	%	±%
INC	Fakruddin Husseinsab Mohasin	172,777	63.92	
PSP	Timmappa Rudrappa Neswi	97,537	36.08	
Majority		75,240	27.84	
Turnout		281,286	67.10	
INC hold		Swing		

=== 1957 ===
1957 Indian general election: Dharwar South
Party	Candidate	Votes	%	±%
INC	Neswi Thimmappa Rudrappa	143,184	68.70	
IND	Patil Kallangowda Siddangouda	65,247	31.30	
Majority		77,937	37.40	
Turnout		208,431	59.48	
INC hold		Swing		

=== 1951 ===
1951 Indian general election: Dharwar South
Party	Candidate	Votes	%	±%
INC	Neswi Timmappa Rudrappa	144,225	60.27	
KMPP	Hosmani Siddappa Kariappa	95,090	39.73	
Majority		49,135	20.54	
Turnout		239,315	64.37	
INC win (new seat)				

== See also ==
- Dharwad district
- Dharwad Lok Sabha constituency
- Dharwad North Lok Sabha constituency
- Haveri district
- Haveri Lok Sabha constituency
- List of former constituencies of the Lok Sabha
