= Jagadish Shettar =

Former Chief Minister of Karnataka

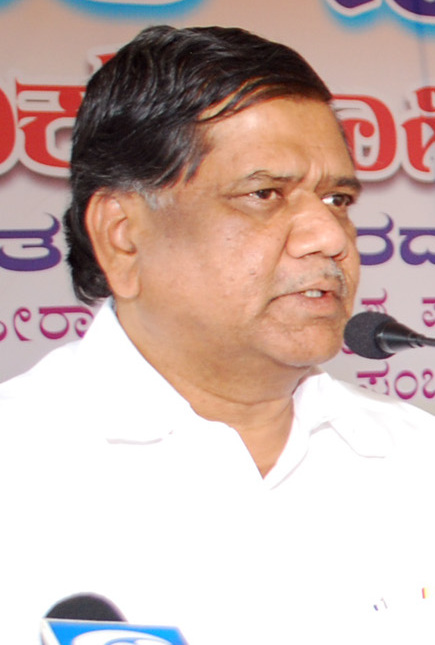

15th Chief Minister of Karnataka
- In office 12 July 2012 – 13 May 2013
- Preceded by: D. V. Sadananda Gowda
- Succeeded by: Siddaramaiah

Member of Parliament, Lok Sabha
- Incumbent
- Assumed office 4 June 2024
- Preceded by: Mangala Suresh Angadi
- Constituency: Belgaum

Minister of Large & Medium Industries Government of Karnataka
- In office 20 August 2019 – 28 July 2021
- Chief Minister: B. S. Yediyurappa
- Preceded by: K. J. George
- Succeeded by: Murugesh Nirani

Minister of Public Enterprises Government of Karnataka
- In office 27 September 2019 – 28 July 2021
- Chief Minister: B. S. Yediyurappa
- Preceded by: H. D. Kumaraswamy
- Succeeded by: M. T. B. Nagaraj

Minister of Rural Development & Panchayat Raj Government of Karnataka
- In office 17 November 2009 – 12 July 2012
- Chief Minister: B. S. Yediyurappa; Sadananda Gowda
- Preceded by: Shobha Karandlaje
- Succeeded by: K. S. Eshwarappa

12th Speaker of the Karnataka Legislative Assembly
- In office 5 June 2008 – 16 November 2009
- Deputy: K. G. Bopaiah
- Preceded by: Krishna
- Succeeded by: K. G. Bopaiah

Minister of Revenue Government of Karnataka
- In office 18 February 2006 – 8 October 2007
- Chief Minister: H. D. Kumaraswamy
- Preceded by: M. P. Prakash
- Succeeded by: G. Karunakara Reddy

Leader of Opposition Karnataka Legislative Assembly
- In office 23 January 2014 – 15 May 2018
- Chief Minister: Siddaramaiah
- Preceded by: H. D. Kumaraswamy
- Succeeded by: B. S. Yeddyurappa
- In office 26 October 1999 – 23 February 2004
- Chief Minister: S. M. Krishna
- Preceded by: Mallikarjun Kharge
- Succeeded by: B. S. Yediyurappa

Member of Karnataka Legislative Assembly
- In office 25 May 2008 – 16 April 2023
- Preceded by: constituency created
- Succeeded by: Mahesh Tenginakai
- Constituency: Hubli-Dharwad Central
- In office 1994–2008
- Succeeded by: constituency delimited
- Constituency: Hubli Rural

Member of Karnataka Legislative Council
- In office 23 June 2023 – 4 June 2024
- Preceded by: Laxman Savadi
- Succeeded by: Basanagouda Badarli
- Constituency: elected by members of Karnataka Legislative Assembly

Personal details
- Born: Jagadish Shivappa Shettar; 17 December 1955 (age 70) Kerura, Bombay State, India (Now Bagalkot district, Karnataka)
- Party: Bharatiya Janata Party (1986–2023; 2024-present)
- Other political affiliations: Indian National Congress (2023–2024)
- Spouse: Shilpa Shettar
- Children: 2
- Education: B.Com, LLB

Jagadish Shivappa Shettar (born 17 December 1955) is an Indian politician who served as the 15th Chief Minister of Karnataka from 2012 to 2013. He is currently serving as Member of parliament representing Belgavi constituency. He has subsequently served as Leader of the Opposition in the Karnataka Legislative Assembly. He also served as the Speaker of the Karnataka Legislative Assembly during 2008–2009. He is a member of the Bharatiya Janata Party. Earlier in 2023 he had joined the Indian National Congress, where he quit the BJP upon not being selected become a Member of the Legislative Assembly (MLA) in 2023. He represented Hubli-Dharwad Central Vidhan Sabha seat, which he resigned in 2023 before the elections. In March 2024, he was announced as the BJP candidate from the Belgaum Constituency for the 2024 Lok Sabha Elections.

On 20 August 2019, he was inducted as the Cabinet Minister for Large & Medium Industries and Minister for Public Enterprise in the BJP Government led by B. S. Yediyurappa. As the cabinet was being dissolved after the resignation of B. S. Yediyurappa, he also further announced he won't be part of any cabinet in the future.

== Early life ==
Shettar was born on 17 December 1955 in Kerur village of Badami taluk in the Bijapur district (now part of Bagalkot) of the erstwhile Mysore State (now Karnataka). His father was Shivappa Shettar (died 2011) and mother, Basavenamma. Shivappa was a senior activist of the Bharatiya Jana Sangh (BJS), and was elected five times to the Hubli-Dharwad Municipal Corporation before becoming the first Mayor of Hubli-Dharwad from the party, when he was elected in 1975. Jagadish's uncle Sadashiv Shettar was the first BJS leader in South India to get elected to the Karnataka Legislative Assembly when he was elected from Hubli City in 1967. Jagadish holds bachelor of commerce and law degrees, and was a practising lawyer for 20 years at the Hubli Bar. He married Shilpa and the couple have two sons: Prashant and Sankalp. Shettar belongs to the Banajiga sub-sect of Lingayat community.

== Political career ==
In 2008, following the BJP victory in Karnataka assembly elections, Shettar was unanimously elected as the Speaker of the Karnataka legislative assembly. However, he resigned from this post in 2009 and was inducted into the cabinet of B.S. Yeddyurappa as Minister for Rural development and Panchayat Raj.

In July 2012, several BJP MLAs owing allegiance to B.S. Yeddyurappa called for the replacement of D.V. Sadananda Gowda with Shettar. After much turmoil, the BJP High Command agreed to make him the Chief minister. He was sworn in on 12 July 2012.

=== 2013 Assembly elections ===
Ahead of assembly polls which were held in May 2013, BJP declared Shettar as its Chief Ministerial candidate for Karnataka state.

Shettar resigned as Chief Minister as BJP failed to retain its power. He submitted his resignation to the Governor of Karnataka on 8 May 2013. BJP suffered a big loss in the May 2013 assembly elections as the Congress wrested Karnataka.

=== Post elections ===
Jagdish Shettar was elected as the leader of BJP's legislative party and Leader of opposition in Karnataka Legislative Assembly.

=== Resignation from BJP ===
He announced his resignation from the Bharatiya Janata Party and also as the Member of Legislative Assembly after he was denied a ticket for the upcoming assembly election on 16 April 2023. Shettar joined the Indian National Congress thereafter, in the presence of INC leaders Mallikarjun Kharge and Siddaramaiah, and assured that he would be contesting the elections in Hubli-Dharwad Central from the Congress Party.

=== 2023 elections ===
In the 2023 Karnataka Legislative elections, he contested from the Congress and lost the election against BJP's Mahesh Tenginakai by a margin of 35,000 votes. He had represented the Hubli-Dharwad Central constituency for over 3 decades which he lost by a vast margin.

=== Return to BJP ===
He returned to Bharatiya Janata Party on 25 January 2024 after spending 9 months in Congress.

== See also ==
- Shettar ministry – Government of Karnataka, India (2012–13)

Preceded by D. V. Sadananda Gowda	Chief Minister of Karnataka; 12 July 2012 – 8 May 2013	Succeeded by K. Siddaramaiah
