= Narasimharaja Assembly constituency =

Legislative Assembly constituency in Karnataka, India

Coordinates: 12.33°N 76.66°E

Narasimharaja
- Constituency No. 218 for the Karnataka Legislative Assembly
- Map of Vidhana Sabha constituency

Constituency details
- Country: India
- Region: South India
- State: Karnataka
- District: Mysore
- Lok Sabha constituency: Mysore
- Established: 1966
- Total electors: 288,775 (2023)
- Reservation: None

Member of Legislative Assembly
- 16th Karnataka Legislative Assembly
- Incumbent Tanveer Sait
- Party: Indian National Congress
- Elected year: 2023
- Preceded by: Azeez Sait

Assembly Constituencies of Mysore district

Narasimharaja Assembly constituency is one of the 224 constituencies in the Karnataka Legislative Assembly of Karnataka, a southern state of India. It is a segment of Mysore Lok Sabha constituency. Narasimharaja is a minority-dominated constituency, with 48% Muslims, 11% Dalits, 5% tribals, 2% Christians.

== Members of the Legislative Assembly ==
Election	Member	Party
1967	Azeez Sait	Sanghata Socialist Party
1972	Azeez Sait	Indian National Congress
1978	Azeez Sait	Indian National Congress
1983	Azeez Sait	Janata Party
1985	Mukthar Unnisa	Indian National Congress
1989	Azeez Sait	Indian National Congress
1994	E. Maruthi Rao Pawar	Bharatiya Janata Party
1999	Azeez Sait	Indian National Congress
2002^ (Note: Died on 28 December 2001)	Tanveer Sait	Indian National Congress
2004	Tanveer Sait	Indian National Congress
2008	Tanveer Sait	Indian National Congress
2013	Tanveer Sait	Indian National Congress
2018	Tanveer Sait	Indian National Congress
2023	Tanveer Sait	Indian National Congress

^By-election

== Election results ==
=== Assembly Election 2023 ===
2023 Karnataka Legislative Assembly election : Narasimharaja
Party	Candidate	Votes	%	±%
INC	Tanveer Sait	83,480	45.14	▲6.68
BJP	S. Satish (Sandesh Swamy)	52,360	28.31	▲1.04
SDPI	Abdul Majeed	41,037	22.19	▲1.63
JD(S)	Abdul Khader (Shahid)	3,548	1.92	▼7.17
NOTA	None of the above	1,209	0.65	▼0.09
Margin of victory		31,120	16.83	▲5.63
Turnout		185,404	64.20	▲2.41
Total valid votes		184,941		
Registered electors		288,775		▲10.19
INC hold		Swing	▲6.68	

=== Assembly Election 2018 ===
2018 Karnataka Legislative Assembly election : Narasimharaja
Party	Candidate	Votes	%	±%
INC	Tanveer Sait	62,268	38.46	▲10.35
BJP	S. Satish (Sandesh Swamy)	44,141	27.27	▲18.07
SDPI	Abdul Majeed	33,284	20.56	▼1.37
JD(S)	Abdul Azeez (Abdulla)	14,709	9.09	▼12.48
SP	B. M. Nataraju	3,471	2.14	New
NOTA	None of the above	1,206	0.74	New
Margin of victory		18,127	11.20	▲5.01
Turnout		161,939	61.79	▲7.06
Total valid votes		161,885		
Registered electors		262,066		▲23.83
INC hold		Swing	▲10.35	

=== Assembly Election 2013 ===
2013 Karnataka Legislative Assembly election : Narasimharaja
Party	Candidate	Votes	%	±%
INC	Tanveer Sait	38,037	28.11	▼8.95
SDPI	Abdul Majid. K. H	29,667	21.93	New
JD(S)	S. Satish (Sandesh Swamy)	29,180	21.57	▼8.93
BJP	B. P. Manjunath	12,443	9.20	▼8.00
KJP	Farid. N. K	1,750	1.29	New
AIADMK	R. Ravindra Kumar	1,001	0.74	New
Margin of victory		8,370	6.19	▼0.37
Turnout		115,819	54.73	▲4.50
Total valid votes		135,293		
Registered electors		211,635		▲4.09
INC hold		Swing	▼8.95	

=== Assembly Election 2008 ===
2008 Karnataka Legislative Assembly election : Narasimharaja
Party	Candidate	Votes	%	±%
INC	Tanveer Sait	37,789	37.06	▼17.14
JD(S)	S. Nagaraju (Sandesh)	31,104	30.50	▲0.79
BJP	B. P. Manjunath	17,545	17.20	New
Independent	Syed Kalimullah	9,834	9.64	New
BSP	Azeezulla (Ajju)	1,748	1.71	▼1.89
Independent	Dr. Anil Thomas	867	0.85	New
Margin of victory		6,685	6.56	▼17.93
Turnout		102,120	50.23	▲3.35
Total valid votes		101,980		
Registered electors		203,316		▼5.21
INC hold		Swing	▼17.14	

=== Assembly Election 2004 ===
2004 Karnataka Legislative Assembly election : Narasimharaja
Party	Candidate	Votes	%	±%
INC	Tanveer Sait	54,462	54.20	▲4.10
JD(S)	E. Maruthi Rao Pawar	29,853	29.71	▼6.24
JD(U)	Anwarji. M	5,589	5.56	New
BSP	Mahesh. R. N	3,616	3.60	New
JP	Tariq Sait	3,040	3.03	New
Kannada Nadu Party	Krishnamurthy. A. R	1,305	1.30	New
SS	Rajesh. J. N	1,005	1.00	New
Independent	S. Shanthappa	644	0.64	New
Margin of victory		24,609	24.49	▲10.34
Turnout		100,545	46.88	▲4.90
Total valid votes		100,490		
Registered electors		214,495		▲8.82
INC hold		Swing	▲4.10	

=== Assembly By-election 2002 ===
2002 Karnataka Legislative Assembly by-election : Narasimharaja
Party	Candidate	Votes	%	±%
INC	Tanveer Sait	41,453	50.10	▼0.41
JD(S)	E. Maruthi Rao Pawar	29,744	35.95	▲30.12
BJP	B. P. Manunath(archestra Manju)	8,703	10.52	▼27.50
Independent	Hottepakshada Rajendra Prasad	989	1.20	New
CPI	Shafeeq Ahmed	723	0.87	New
Margin of victory		11,709	14.15	▲1.66
Turnout		82,746	41.98	▼18.06
Total valid votes		82,746		
Registered electors		197,113		▲5.69
INC hold		Swing	▼0.41	

=== Assembly Election 1999 ===
1999 Karnataka Legislative Assembly election : Narasimharaja
Party	Candidate	Votes	%	±%
INC	Azeez Sait	56,485	50.51	New
BJP	E. Maruthi Rao Pawar	42,516	38.02	▲5.98
JD(S)	Dr. D. Satyanarayana	6,517	5.83	New
Independent	D. C. Gnana Prakash	2,171	1.94	New
Independent	Husseni Baig	2,088	1.87	New
Independent	B. S. Kumaraswamy Alias Bannur Kumar	732	0.65	New
Independent	C. Swamy	706	0.63	New
Margin of victory		13,969	12.49	▲11.02
Turnout		111,975	60.04	▼13.21
Total valid votes		111,819		
Rejected ballots		26	0.02	▼2.18
Registered electors		186,494		▲35.51
INC gain from BJP		Swing	▲18.47	

=== Assembly Election 1994 ===
1994 Karnataka Legislative Assembly election : Narasimharaja
Party	Candidate	Votes	%	±%
BJP	E. Maruthi Rao Pawar	31,592	32.04	▲2.33
Independent	Azeez Sait	30,141	30.57	New
JD	S. Nagaraj	26,862	27.24	▲15.72
INC	Abdul Azeez	6,661	6.76	New
Independent	M. Khalid	1,177	1.19	New
Margin of victory		1,451	1.47	▼16.77
Turnout		100,815	73.25	▲16.02
Total valid votes		98,595		
Rejected ballots		2,220	2.20	▼3.77
Registered electors		137,627		▼10.91
BJP gain from INC		Swing	▼15.91	

=== Assembly Election 1989 ===
1989 Karnataka Legislative Assembly election : Narasimharaja
Party	Candidate	Votes	%	±%
INC	Azeez Sait	39,858	47.95	▲18.30
BJP	E. Maruthi Rao Pawar	24,698	29.71	▲8.00
JD	Dr. D. Satyanarayana	9,574	11.52	New
Independent	R. G. Harshad	4,777	5.75	New
JP	Abdul Jameel	1,275	1.53	New
CPI	Raju	747	0.90	▼14.64
Margin of victory		15,160	18.24	▲10.30
Turnout		88,411	57.23	▲8.92
Total valid votes		83,130		
Rejected ballots		5,281	5.97	▲4.26
Registered electors		154,481		▲39.82
INC hold		Swing	▲18.30	

=== Assembly Election 1985 ===
1985 Karnataka Legislative Assembly election : Narasimharaja
Party	Candidate	Votes	%	±%
INC	Mukthar Unnisa	15,552	29.65	▼4.13
BJP	E. Maruthi Rao Pawar	11,388	21.71	▲19.95
CPI	S. K. Rehaman	8,151	15.54	New
Independent	R. Q. Arshad	8,077	15.40	New
Independent	B. Kodanda Ramu	2,125	4.05	New
Independent	Taj Mohammed Khan	2,015	3.84	New
Independent	S. Shanthappa	1,435	2.74	New
Margin of victory		4,164	7.94	▼9.54
Turnout		53,370	48.31	▼7.96
Total valid votes		52,457		
Rejected ballots		913	1.71	▼1.05
Registered electors		110,485		▲16.60
INC gain from JP		Swing	▼21.61	

=== Assembly Election 1983 ===
1983 Karnataka Legislative Assembly election : Narasimharaja
Party	Candidate	Votes	%	±%
JP	Azeez Sait	26,576	51.26	▲18.35
INC	R. Q. Arshad	17,512	33.78	▲27.16
IC(S)	Chikkrangappa	3,642	7.02	New
Independent	Santappa	1,017	1.96	New
BJP	B. H. Khleel Khan	914	1.76	New
Independent	Nadi Musfeer	613	1.18	New
Independent	Raju	374	0.72	New
Independent	Gurusiddaiah	336	0.65	New
Margin of victory		9,064	17.48	▼8.42
Turnout		53,321	56.27	▼8.82
Total valid votes		51,848		
Rejected ballots		1,473	2.76	▼0.02
Registered electors		94,755		▲22.81
JP gain from INC(I)		Swing	▼7.55	

=== Assembly Election 1978 ===
1978 Karnataka Legislative Assembly election : Narasimharaja
Party	Candidate	Votes	%	±%
INC(I)	Azeez Sait	28,718	58.81	New
JP	B. Ilyas Ahmad	16,070	32.91	New
INC	M. Govindappa	3,233	6.62	▼57.57
Independent	K. Nanjuda	519	1.06	New
Margin of victory		12,648	25.90	▼18.60
Turnout		50,224	65.09	▲20.62
Total valid votes		48,828		
Rejected ballots		1,396	2.78	▲2.78
Registered electors		77,158		▲20.27
INC(I) gain from INC		Swing	▼5.38	

=== Assembly Election 1972 ===
1972 Mysore State Legislative Assembly election : Narasimharaja
Party	Candidate	Votes	%	±%
INC	Azeez Sait	17,784	64.19	▲52.69
Janata Paksha Party	A. Ramanna	5,454	19.68	New
Independent	Rasheed Ahmed Khan	3,355	12.11	New
Independent	Mynaa Gopalakishna	869	3.14	New
Margin of victory		12,330	44.50	▲34.13
Turnout		28,529	44.47	▼7.92
Total valid votes		27,707		
Registered electors		64,154		▲9.64
INC gain from SSP		Swing	▲19.30	

=== Assembly Election 1967 ===
1967 Mysore State Legislative Assembly election : Narasimharaja
Party	Candidate	Votes	%	±%
SSP	Azeez Sait	13,166	44.89	New
PSP	B. K. Puttaiah	10,123	34.51	New
INC	M. J. M. Yakoob	3,373	11.50	New
ABJS	B. N. S. Rao	1,413	4.82	New
Independent	A. Sammed	966	3.29	New
Independent	M. C. Appachoo	290	0.99	New
Margin of victory		3,043	10.37	
Turnout		30,653	52.39	
Total valid votes		29,331		
Registered electors		58,514		
SSP win (new seat)				

== See also ==
- Mysore City South Assembly constituency
- Mysore City North Assembly constituency
- Mysore Taluk Assembly constituency
- Mysore
- Mysore district
- Mysore Lok Sabha constituency
- List of constituencies of Karnataka Legislative Assembly
