= Hubli City Assembly constituency =

Former Assembly constituency in Karnataka, India

Coordinates: 15.350282°N 75.137612°E

Hubli
- Former constituency No. 176 for the Karnataka Legislative Assembly

Constituency details
- Country: India
- Region: South India
- State: Karnataka
- Division: Belgaum
- District: Dharwad
- Lok Sabha constituency: Dharwad
- Established: 1951
- Abolished: 2008
- Reservation: None

Hubli City Assembly constituency was one of the constituencies in Karnataka state assembly in India until 2008 when it was made defunct. It was part of Dharwad Lok Sabha constituency.

== Members of the Legislative Assembly ==
Election	Member	Party
1952	Dundur Kalmeshwar Basaweshwar	Indian National Congress
1952	Sambrani Dharamappa Yallappa	Indian National Congress
1957	Fakruddinsab Hussensab Mohsin	Indian National Congress
1962	Koppal Rajesab Abdulsab	Indian National Congress
1967	S. S. Shankarappa	Bharatiya Jana Sangh
1972	Sanadi Imam Goususaheb	Indian National Congress
1978	Jaratarghar Mahadevsa Govindsa	Janata Party
1983	Jaratarghar Mahadevsa Govindsa	Bharatiya Janata Party
1985	A. M. Hindasageri	Indian National Congress
1989	A. M. Hindasageri	Indian National Congress
1994	Ashok Katwe	Bharatiya Janata Party
1999	Honnalli Jabbarkhan Hayatkhan	Indian National Congress
2004	Honnalli Jabbarkhan Hayatkhan	Indian National Congress

== Election results ==
=== Assembly Election 2004 ===
2004 Karnataka Legislative Assembly election : Hubli City
Party	Candidate	Votes	%	±%
INC	Honnalli Jabbarkhan Hayatkhan	41,971	46.08	▲5.29
BJP	Ashok Katwe	40,155	44.09	▲5.40
Kannada Nadu Party	Murugesh Eklaspur	2,353	2.58	New
JP	Altaf M. Kittur	1,639	1.80	New
CPI	David Goni	1,495	1.64	New
BSP	Shobha D. Ballari	945	1.04	▼0.28
JD(S)	Neelgund Mahaboobsab Davalsab	923	1.01	▼5.52
Independent	Shivabasava Swamiji	879	0.97	New
Margin of victory		1,816	1.99	▼0.11
Turnout		91,082	60.94	▼3.89
Total valid votes		91,076		
Registered electors		149,474		▲10.33
INC hold		Swing	▲5.29	

=== Assembly Election 1999 ===
1999 Karnataka Legislative Assembly election : Hubli City
Party	Candidate	Votes	%	±%
INC	Honnalli Jabbarkhan Hayatkhan	34,019	40.79	▼1.01
BJP	Ashok Katwe	32,270	38.69	▼13.09
Independent	Durgappa Kashappa Bijawad	8,051	9.65	New
JD(S)	Dr. Pandurang Patil	5,446	6.53	New
Independent	A. F. Kittur	1,191	1.43	New
BSP	Parashuram Koddaddi	1,099	1.32	New
Independent	Laxman Ummmanasa Dalabanjan	555	0.67	New
Margin of victory		1,749	2.10	▼7.88
Turnout		87,837	64.83	▼5.52
Total valid votes		83,399		
Rejected ballots		4,431	5.04	▲2.94
Registered electors		135,482		▲14.38
INC gain from BJP		Swing	▼10.99	

=== Assembly Election 1994 ===
1994 Karnataka Legislative Assembly election : Hubli City
Party	Candidate	Votes	%	±%
BJP	Ashok Katwe	42,244	51.78	▲24.62
INC	A. M. Hindasageri	34,103	41.80	▼9.97
JD	Asuti. N. S	1,786	2.19	▼16.93
INC	A. N. Kachi	1,333	1.63	New
Independent	S. M. Patil	630	0.77	New
Independent	A. M. Asundi	564	0.69	New
Margin of victory		8,141	9.98	▼14.64
Turnout		83,338	70.35	▲5.20
Total valid votes		81,586		
Rejected ballots		1,752	2.10	▼3.37
Registered electors		118,454		▼0.18
BJP gain from INC		Swing	▲0.01	

=== Assembly Election 1989 ===
1989 Karnataka Legislative Assembly election : Hubli City
Party	Candidate	Votes	%	±%
INC	A. M. Hindasageri	37,832	51.77	▼1.55
BJP	Ashok Katwe	19,844	27.16	▼13.90
JD	Madhurakar. Y. D	13,972	19.12	New
JP	Alagundagi. V. I	1,055	1.44	New
Margin of victory		17,988	24.62	▲12.36
Turnout		77,305	65.15	▼3.91
Total valid votes		73,075		
Rejected ballots		4,230	5.47	▲3.92
Registered electors		118,666		▲19.98
INC hold		Swing	▼1.55	

=== Assembly Election 1985 ===
1985 Karnataka Legislative Assembly election : Hubli City
Party	Candidate	Votes	%	±%
INC	A. M. Hindasageri	35,856	53.32	▲27.96
BJP	S. S. Shettar	27,610	41.06	▲0.26
CPI	A. J. Mudhol	2,310	3.44	▼29.33
LKD	M. P. Laxmeshwar	632	0.94	New
Margin of victory		8,246	12.26	▲4.23
Turnout		68,301	69.06	▲4.98
Total valid votes		67,242		
Rejected ballots		1,059	1.55	▼1.77
Registered electors		98,904		▲8.98
INC gain from BJP		Swing	▲12.52	

=== Assembly Election 1983 ===
1983 Karnataka Legislative Assembly election : Hubli City
Party	Candidate	Votes	%	±%
BJP	Jaratarghar Mahadevsa Govindsa	22,938	40.80	New
CPI	Mudhol Abdularahiman Janglisab	18,424	32.77	▼14.66
INC	Sanadi Imamsaheb Goususab	14,259	25.36	▲22.77
Margin of victory		4,514	8.03	▲7.59
Turnout		58,152	64.08	▼10.16
Total valid votes		56,223		
Rejected ballots		1,929	3.32	▲0.85
Registered electors		90,752		▲13.59
BJP gain from JP		Swing	▼7.08	

=== Assembly Election 1978 ===
1978 Karnataka Legislative Assembly election : Hubli City
Party	Candidate	Votes	%	±%
JP	Jaratarghar Mahadevsa Govindsa	27,694	47.88	New
CPI	Mudhol Abdularahiman Janglisab	27,438	47.43	New
INC	Sanadi Imamsaheb Goususab	1,501	2.59	▼54.92
Independent	Khatib Abdulrahim Maktumhusen	599	1.04	New
Independent	Mannur Krishnamurthy Gundacharya	352	0.61	New
Margin of victory		256	0.44	▼18.87
Turnout		59,314	74.24	▲5.08
Total valid votes		57,846		
Rejected ballots		1,468	2.47	▲2.47
Registered electors		79,895		▲25.13
JP gain from INC		Swing	▼9.63	

=== Assembly Election 1972 ===
1972 Mysore State Legislative Assembly election : Hubli City
Party	Candidate	Votes	%	±%
INC	Sanadi Imam Goususaheb	24,741	57.51	▲28.74
ABJS	S. S. Shivamurteppa	16,432	38.20	▼5.40
INC(O)	U. G. Shivalingappa	1,848	4.30	New
Margin of victory		8,309	19.31	▲4.48
Turnout		44,157	69.16	▲5.94
Total valid votes		43,021		
Registered electors		63,852		▲11.39
INC gain from ABJS		Swing	▲13.91	

=== Assembly Election 1967 ===
1967 Mysore State Legislative Assembly election : Hubli City
Party	Candidate	Votes	%	±%
ABJS	S. S. Shankarappa	14,898	43.60	New
INC	H. M. Mirasaheb	9,830	28.77	▼28.51
CPI	M. A. Janglisab	8,012	23.45	▲21.56
Independent	P. V. Shivasangayya	507	1.48	New
Independent	N. P. Subbarayalu	417	1.22	New
Independent	T. S. Mahadevayya	390	1.14	New
Margin of victory		5,068	14.83	▼10.25
Turnout		36,239	63.22	▼2.62
Total valid votes		34,170		
Registered electors		57,321		▼2.02
ABJS gain from INC		Swing	▼13.68	

=== Assembly Election 1962 ===
1962 Mysore State Legislative Assembly election : Hubli City
Party	Candidate	Votes	%	±%
INC	Koppal Rajesab Abdulsab	21,169	57.28	▼7.68
ABJS	Shettar Sadashiva Shankarappa	11,900	32.20	New
Independent	Shambhurao Vishwanath Joshi	3,187	8.62	New
CPI	Nagarsi Abdulrahimansab Janglisab	698	1.89	New
Margin of victory		9,269	25.08	▼22.25
Turnout		38,518	65.84	▲10.00
Total valid votes		36,954		
Registered electors		58,501		▲20.50
INC hold		Swing	▼7.68	

=== Assembly Election 1957 ===
1957 Mysore State Legislative Assembly election : Hubli City
Party	Candidate	Votes	%	±%
INC	Fakruddinsab Hussensab Mohsin	17,609	64.96	▲19.05
ABJS	Jaratarghar Mahadevsa Govindsa	4,779	17.63	▲13.03
Independent	Kambali Shankarappa Shiddappa	3,067	11.31	New
Independent	Nambiyar Kannankelu	1,653	6.10	New
Margin of victory		12,830	47.33	▲41.74
Turnout		27,108	55.84	▼36.91
Total valid votes		27,108		
Registered electors		48,548		▼53.66
INC hold		Swing	▲40.30	

=== Assembly Election 1952 ===
1952 Bombay State Legislative Assembly election : Hubli City
Party	Candidate	Votes	%	±%
INC	Dundur Kalmeshwar Basaweshwar	23,962	24.66	New
INC	Sambrani Dharamappa Yallappa	20,653	21.25	New
KMPP	Marigaudar Veeranagauda Rudragauda	18,533	19.07	New
Independent	Goodwale, Raziuddin Hatel Sab	10,556	10.86	New
SCF	Hanamantappa Bharamappa Kusnur	8,740	8.99	New
ABJS	Ramanns Hanmantapa Kapse	4,467	4.60	New
Independent	Nijgunaya Basawaya Hiremath	3,365	3.46	New
Independent	Chhannappagauda Basangauda Patil	2,458	2.53	New
Independent	Narayan Dattatraya Saraf	2,098	2.16	New
Independent	Kanteppanavar Renukappa Yallappa	1,225	1.26	New
Margin of victory		5,429	5.59	
Turnout		97,170	46.38	
Total valid votes		97,170		
Registered electors		104,765		
INC win (new seat)				

== See also ==
- List of constituencies of the Karnataka Legislative Assembly
