= Azeez Sait =

Indian politician

Member of the Karnataka Legislative Assembly
- In office 1999–2001
- Preceded by: E. Maruthi Rao Pawar
- Succeeded by: Tanveer Sait
- Constituency: Narasimharaja
- In office 1989–1994
- Preceded by: Mukthar Unnisa
- Succeeded by: E. Maruthi Rao Pawar
- Constituency: Narasimharaja
- In office 1967–1985
- Preceded by: Constituency established
- Succeeded by: Mukthar Unnisa
- Constituency: Narasimharaja

Member of Parliament, Lok Sabha
- In office 31 December 1984 – 27 November 1989
- Preceded by: Fakruddinsab Hussensab Mohsin
- Succeeded by: B. M. Mujahid
- Constituency: Dharwad South

Minister of State for Transport, Tourism, Labour, Wakf Department and Industries & Commerce of Karnataka
- In office 1972–1984

Member of Karnataka Legislative Council
- In office 1960 – 1966
- Constituency: Mysore South LA

Personal details
- Born: 15 March 1926 Mysuru
- Died: 28 December 2001 (aged 74) Mysuru
- Party: Indian National Congress (22nd April 1962 to 28 December 2001)
- Relatives: Kubra Sait (grand-daughter); Danish Sait (grandson); Tanveer Sait (son); Yasmin Sait (daughter)

Azeez Sait (15 March 1926 – 28 December 2001) was an Indian politician who served as the Minister of State for Transport, Tourism, Labour Wakf Department and Industries and Commerce of Karnataka from 1972 to 1984. A prominent minority leader of the Congress Party, he represented the Narasimharaja constituency in the legislative assembly a record six times between 1967 and his death in 2001.

== Career ==
Azeez Sait belonged to a family of clothiers whose patrons included the Mysore royal family. His father Abdul Sattar Sait had a department store in the Lakshmi complex, opposite the clock tower. Azeez Sait worked in this shop for 17 years before venturing into public life. In 1952, Azeez Sait managed the campaign of advocate Mohammad Shariff in Mandi Mohalla. He was also an active labour leader. He was the founder-president of the Mysore District Beedi Mazdoor Federation. He was the first Muslim to be elected as a Member of the Legislative Council (MLC) for Mysore, Mandya, Kodagu and Hassan.

He was first elected to the State Assembly in 1967 after completing his tenure as an MLC. He was an active member and participated in a three-day dharna in the State Assembly. He was the Chairman of the Karnataka Tourism Development Corporation from 1973 to 1977. He contested Lok Sabha Election from Dharwad and won in 1984. Sait was considered a stormy petrel of Karnataka politics. He served as Minister for Labour, Transport, Tourism, Wakf, and Revenue. Besides being the first Muslim member of the State Legislative Council, he was also a legislator for an uninterrupted tenure of 18 years from 1967 to December 1984.

Sait was a Transport Minister in the Devaraj Urs Ministry. He was a seasoned politician, who was a right-hand man of the late Devraj Urs and minister in his Cabinet. He was also a minister in the Bangarappa Cabinet. In 1982, he joined the Janata Party and became a minister in the first non-Congress Government in Karnataka. In the 1994 assembly election, Sait was defeated by Maruti Rao Pawar. In 1999, he avenged the defeat and returned to the State Assembly from the same Narasimharaja Constituency.

Azeez Sait was also the National Chairman of the AICC Minorities Wing.

== Positions held ==
- President - Beedi Mazdoor Association, Mysore.
- President - Bangalore District Beedi Mazdoor Association.
- President - B. T. Rice and Oil Mills Workers' Association.
- Member - Labour Advisory Board.
- Member - Labour Implementation and Evaluation Committee.
- Municipal Councillor from 1953 to 1962.
- Member of P.S.P. since 1945; resigned from that party and joined Congress on 22 April 1962.
- Member of Legislative Committee (1960-1966).
- Founder member and Chairman (i) RIFA UII Muslimeen Education Trust, Mysore, since 1961. (ii) Karnataka Wakf Development Corporation.
- Chairman (i) Alameen Education Society (1981-1984). (ii) Alameen Charitable Trust (1978-1984). (iii) Tippu Sultan Wakf State till 1983. (iv) Abul Kalam Azad Academy, Karnataka Branch. (v) All India Anjumane-Tariqi-e-Urdu Karnataka Branch (vi) Mysore District School Betterment Committee
- President, Karnataka Beedi Workers Federation
- Member of Karnataka Legislative Assembly (1967-1984)
- Member of 8th Lok Sabha from Dharwad South (Lok Sabha constituency) (1984 - 1989)

== Death ==
In 2001, at the age of 80, Azeez Sait died in a hospital in Mysore following a cardiac arrest. He is survived by his wife, four sons, and two daughters.
