= Shiggaon Assembly constituency =

Legislative Assembly constituency in Karnataka State, India

Coordinates: 14.99°N 75.22°E

Shiggaon
- Constituency No. 83 for the Karnataka Legislative Assembly

Constituency details
- Country: India
- Region: South India
- State: Karnataka
- District: Haveri
- Lok Sabha constituency: Dharwad
- Established: 1951
- Total electors: 226,226
- Reservation: None

Member of Legislative Assembly
- 16th Karnataka Legislative Assembly
- Incumbent Yasir Ahmed Khan Pathan
- Party: Indian National Congress
- Preceded by: Basavaraj Bommai

Shiggaon Assembly constituency is one of the 224 Legislative Assembly constituencies of Karnataka in India.

It is part of Haveri district, and a segment of Dharwad Lok Sabha constituency.

== Members of the Legislative Assembly ==
| Election | Member | Party |
|---|---|---|
| 1957 | Patil Rudgragouda Chanbasangouda | Indian National Congress |
| 1962 | Fakkirappa Shiddappa Taware | Indian National Congress |
| 1967 | S. Nijalingappa | Indian National Congress |
| 1972 | Nadaf Mohammed Kasimsab Mardansab | Indian National Congress |
| 1978 | Nadaf Mohammed Kasimsab Mardansab | Indian National Congress |
| 1983 | Nadaf Mohammed Kasimsab Mardansab | Indian National Congress |
| 1985 | Neelakanthagouda Veeranagouda Patil | Independent politician |
| 1989 | Manjunath Kunnur | Indian National Congress |
| 1994 | Manjunath Kunnur | Indian National Congress |
| 1999 | Syed Azeempeer Khadri | Janata Dal |
| 2004 | Sindhura Rajashekar | Independent politician |
| 2008 | Basavaraj Bommai | Bharatiya Janata Party |
| 2013 | Basavaraj Bommai | Bharatiya Janata Party |
| 2018 | Basavaraj Bommai | Bharatiya Janata Party |
| 2023 (Note: Elected to Lok Sabha on 4 June 2024) | Basavaraj Bommai | Bharatiya Janata Party |
| 2024^ | Yasir Ahmed Khan Pathan | Indian National Congress |

== Election results ==
=== Assembly By-election 2024 ===
2024 Karnataka Legislative Assembly by-election : Shiggaon
| Party | Candidate | Votes | % | ±% |
|---|---|---|---|---|
| INC | Yasir Ahmed Khan Pathan | 100,756 | 52.64% | ▲17.46 |
| BJP | Bharath Bommai | 87,308 | 45.61% | ▼9.34 |
| KRS | Ravi Krishna Reddy | 1,876 | 0.98% | New |
| NOTA | None of the above | 834 | 0.44% | ▼0.29 |
| Margin of victory | | 13,448 | 7.03% | ▼12.74 |
| Turnout | | 191,727 | 80.67% | ▲0.15 |
| Total valid votes | | 191,420 | | |
| Registered electors | | 237,671 | | ▲5.06 |
| INC gain from BJP | | Swing | ▼2.31 | |

=== Assembly Election 2023 ===
2023 Karnataka Legislative Assembly election : Shiggaon
| Party | Candidate | Votes | % | ±% |
|---|---|---|---|---|
| BJP | Basavaraj Bommai | 100,016 | 54.95% | ▲5.93 |
| INC | Yasir Ahmed Khan Pathan | 64,038 | 35.18% | ▼8.43 |
| JD(S) | Shashidhar Yeligar | 13,928 | 7.65% | ▲6.86 |
| NOTA | None of the above | 1,336 | 0.73% | ▲0.09 |
| AAP | Mahaboobsab Dadusab Kalebag | 1,175 | 0.65% | New |
| Margin of victory | | 35,978 | 19.77% | ▲14.35 |
| Turnout | | 182,147 | 80.52% | ▲0.17 |
| Total valid votes | | 182,027 | | |
| Registered electors | | 226,226 | | ▲6.10 |
| BJP hold | | Swing | ▲5.93 | |

=== Assembly Election 2018 ===
2018 Karnataka Legislative Assembly election : Shiggaon
| Party | Candidate | Votes | % | ±% |
|---|---|---|---|---|
| BJP | Basavaraj Bommai | 83,868 | 49.02% | ▲0.50 |
| INC | Syed Azeempeer Khadri | 74,603 | 43.61% | ▲1.41 |
| Independent | Somanna Urf Swamiling Bevinamarad | 7,203 | 4.21% | New |
| JD(S) | Ashok Bevinamar | 1,353 | 0.79% | ▼0.23 |
| NOTA | None of the above | 1,089 | 0.64% | New |
| Margin of victory | | 9,265 | 5.42% | ▼0.90 |
| Turnout | | 171,313 | 80.35% | ▲0.63 |
| Total valid votes | | 171,074 | | |
| Registered electors | | 213,210 | | ▲13.17 |
| BJP hold | | Swing | ▲0.50 | |

=== Assembly Election 2013 ===
2013 Karnataka Legislative Assembly election : Shiggaon
| Party | Candidate | Votes | % | ±% |
|---|---|---|---|---|
| BJP | Basavaraj Bommai | 73,007 | 48.52% | ▼3.24 |
| INC | Khadri Sayed Azimpeer Sayed Kaderbasha | 63,504 | 42.20% | ▲0.88 |
| KJP | Bapugoudra Kashinathgoudra Patil | 7,810 | 5.19% | New |
| JD(S) | Sumangala Kadappa Mysore | 1,531 | 1.02% | ▼0.72 |
| NCP | Nandan Baburao Tambe | 1,305 | 0.87% | New |
| Margin of victory | | 9,503 | 6.32% | ▼4.12 |
| Turnout | | 150,189 | 79.72% | ▲7.95 |
| Total valid votes | | 150,469 | | |
| Registered electors | | 188,400 | | ▲9.72 |
| BJP hold | | Swing | ▼3.24 | |

=== Assembly Election 2008 ===
2008 Karnataka Legislative Assembly election : Shiggaon
| Party | Candidate | Votes | % | ±% |
|---|---|---|---|---|
| BJP | Basavaraj Bommai | 63,780 | 51.76% | ▲28.47 |
| INC | Khadri Sayyad Azeemper Khadar Basha | 50,918 | 41.32% | ▲6.10 |
| JD(S) | Prema. S. Patil | 2,149 | 1.74% | ▲0.31 |
| Independent | Kadlaihnavarmath Rajendra | 1,485 | 1.21% | New |
| BSP | Sayed Roshan Akabarsha Mulla | 1,034 | 0.84% | ▼0.02 |
| Independent | Balannanvar Basavaraj Ramanna | 984 | 0.80% | New |
| Margin of victory | | 12,862 | 10.44% | ▲9.72 |
| Turnout | | 123,240 | 71.77% | ▲0.66 |
| Total valid votes | | 123,229 | | |
| Registered electors | | 171,717 | | ▲4.90 |
| BJP gain from Independent | | Swing | ▲15.82 | |

=== Assembly Election 2004 ===
2004 Karnataka Legislative Assembly election : Shiggaon
| Party | Candidate | Votes | % | ±% |
|---|---|---|---|---|
| Independent | Sindhura Rajashekar | 41,811 | 35.94% | New |
| INC | Khadri Syed Ajimpeer Khadar Basha | 40,971 | 35.22% | ▲7.92 |
| BJP | Bevinamarada Somanna | 27,096 | 23.29% | ▼4.62 |
| JD(S) | Mohan B. Menasankai | 1,662 | 1.43% | ▼28.17 |
| Kannada Nadu Party | Dr. Prabhugowda Rudragowda Patil | 1,127 | 0.97% | New |
| BSP | Dr. Syed Roshan Mulla | 999 | 0.86% | New |
| Urs Samyuktha Paksha | Mirajakar Ramachandra Yogappa | 839 | 0.72% | New |
| RPI(A) | Waddara Basavaraja Narasappa | 755 | 0.65% | New |
| Margin of victory | | 840 | 0.72% | ▼0.97 |
| Turnout | | 116,399 | 71.11% | ▼0.58 |
| Total valid votes | | 116,340 | | |
| Registered electors | | 163,698 | | ▲12.22 |
| Independent gain from JD(S) | | Swing | ▲6.34 | |

=== Assembly Election 1999 ===
1999 Karnataka Legislative Assembly election : Shiggaon
| Party | Candidate | Votes | % | ±% |
|---|---|---|---|---|
| JD(S) | Syed Azeempeer Khadri | 28,725 | 29.60% | New |
| BJP | Shankaragouda Basannagouda Patil | 27,084 | 27.91% | ▲18.45 |
| INC | Kunnur Manjunath Chennappa | 26,497 | 27.30% | ▲1.41 |
| Independent | Shivanand Ramageri | 13,055 | 13.45% | New |
| SP | Jain Vinodakumar Sambelamal | 1,686 | 1.74% | New |
| Margin of victory | | 1,641 | 1.69% | ▼4.66 |
| Turnout | | 104,579 | 71.69% | ▲1.10 |
| Total valid votes | | 97,047 | | |
| Rejected ballots | | 7,519 | 7.19% | ▲4.84 |
| Registered electors | | 145,867 | | ▲10.49 |
| JD(S) gain from INC | | Swing | ▲3.71 | |

=== Assembly Election 1994 ===
1994 Karnataka Legislative Assembly election : Shiggaon
| Party | Candidate | Votes | % | ±% |
|---|---|---|---|---|
| INC | Manjunath Kunnur | 23,552 | 25.89% | ▼23.81 |
| Independent | Abdulgani Akabarsaheb Koitewale | 17,778 | 19.54% | New |
| Independent | Mohan Basavaraj Menasinkai | 9,179 | 10.09% | New |
| INC | Kadakol Kotrappa Mariyappa | 9,038 | 9.93% | New |
| BJP | Ramanna Mahadevappa Basapur | 8,611 | 9.46% | New |
| JD | Honnalli Jabbarkhan | 8,443 | 9.28% | ▼34.88 |
| Independent | Neelakanthagouda Veeranagouda Patil | 6,806 | 7.48% | New |
| KRRS | Patil Neelakantagouda Chanabasanagouda | 3,143 | 3.45% | New |
| Independent | Santhayak. N | 938 | 1.03% | New |
| Margin of victory | | 5,774 | 6.35% | ▲0.82 |
| Turnout | | 93,190 | 70.59% | ▼0.48 |
| Total valid votes | | 90,984 | | |
| Rejected ballots | | 2,186 | 2.35% | ▼4.01 |
| Registered electors | | 132,020 | | ▲7.68 |
| INC hold | | Swing | ▼23.81 | |

=== Assembly Election 1989 ===
1989 Karnataka Legislative Assembly election : Shiggaon
| Party | Candidate | Votes | % | ±% |
|---|---|---|---|---|
| INC | Manjunath Kunnur | 40,549 | 49.70% | ▲19.32 |
| JD | Khadri Sayyadnooruddin Sayyadabdulrazak | 36,035 | 44.16% | New |
| JP | Mamledesai. B. B | 2,978 | 3.65% | New |
| Kranti Sabha | Naregal Muregappa Ramappa | 1,912 | 2.34% | New |
| Margin of victory | | 4,514 | 5.53% | ▼15.48 |
| Turnout | | 87,134 | 71.07% | ▼1.80 |
| Total valid votes | | 81,595 | | |
| Rejected ballots | | 5,539 | 6.36% | ▲4.52 |
| Registered electors | | 122,600 | | ▲28.46 |
| INC gain from Independent | | Swing | ▼1.68 | |

=== Assembly Election 1985 ===
1985 Karnataka Legislative Assembly election : Shiggaon
| Party | Candidate | Votes | % | ±% |
|---|---|---|---|---|
| Independent | Neelakanthagouda Veeranagouda Patil | 35,075 | 51.38% | New |
| INC | Nadaf Mohammed Kasimsab Mardansab | 20,736 | 30.38% | ▼17.74 |
| JP | Dundigoudar Hanamantagouda Raghunathagouda | 10,147 | 14.86% | ▼28.68 |
| Independent | Kohlapuri Hajaratsab Hajaratsab | 1,119 | 1.64% | New |
| Margin of victory | | 14,339 | 21.01% | ▲16.43 |
| Turnout | | 69,544 | 72.87% | ▲7.45 |
| Total valid votes | | 68,263 | | |
| Rejected ballots | | 1,281 | 1.84% | ▼1.45 |
| Registered electors | | 95,435 | | ▲8.39 |
| Independent gain from INC | | Swing | ▲3.26 | |

=== Assembly Election 1983 ===
1983 Karnataka Legislative Assembly election : Shiggaon
| Party | Candidate | Votes | % | ±% |
|---|---|---|---|---|
| INC | Nadaf Mohammed Kasimsab Mardansab | 26,801 | 48.12% | ▲43.50 |
| JP | Patil Hanamanatagoud Raghunathgoud | 24,250 | 43.54% | ▲5.88 |
| BJP | Kulkarni Venkatesh Bhimrao | 1,488 | 2.67% | New |
| Independent | Savanur Abdul Hameed Jabbarkhan | 1,012 | 1.82% | New |
| Independent | Shiralkoppa Khadarkhan Sravarkhan | 895 | 1.61% | New |
| Independent | Madar Madevappa Adiveppa | 699 | 1.25% | New |
| Independent | Mirchooni Sayyadabdulrahiman Sayyadbadesab | 555 | 1.00% | New |
| Margin of victory | | 2,551 | 4.58% | ▼14.12 |
| Turnout | | 57,597 | 65.42% | ▼10.52 |
| Total valid votes | | 55,700 | | |
| Rejected ballots | | 1,897 | 3.29% | ▼0.21 |
| Registered electors | | 88,046 | | ▲8.01 |
| INC gain from INC(I) | | Swing | ▼8.24 | |

=== Assembly Election 1978 ===
1978 Karnataka Legislative Assembly election : Shiggaon
| Party | Candidate | Votes | % | ±% |
|---|---|---|---|---|
| INC(I) | Nadaf Mohammed Kasimsab Mardansab | 33,669 | 56.36% | New |
| JP | Patil Shankaragouda Rudragouda | 22,496 | 37.66% | New |
| INC | Patil Shankaragouda Rudragouda | 2,759 | 4.62% | ▼44.17 |
| Independent | Bannur Abdulrasheed Khadargous | 545 | 0.91% | New |
| Margin of victory | | 11,173 | 18.70% | ▲10.00 |
| Turnout | | 61,904 | 75.94% | ▲13.86 |
| Total valid votes | | 59,735 | | |
| Rejected ballots | | 2,169 | 3.50% | ▲3.50 |
| Registered electors | | 81,517 | | ▲20.05 |
| INC(I) gain from INC | | Swing | ▲7.57 | |

=== Assembly Election 1972 ===
1972 Mysore State Legislative Assembly election : Shiggaon
| Party | Candidate | Votes | % | ±% |
|---|---|---|---|---|
| INC | Nadaf Mohammed Kasimsab Mardansab | 19,799 | 48.79% | New |
| Independent | P. B. Hanmantgouda | 16,270 | 40.10% | New |
| Independent | P. A. Nekamahammadkha | 2,781 | 6.85% | New |
| Independent | R. K. Husainkhan | 664 | 1.64% | New |
| ABJS | C. D. Mudakappa | 657 | 1.62% | New |
| Independent | P. B. Shivangouda | 405 | 1.00% | New |
| Margin of victory | | 3,529 | 8.70% | |
| Turnout | | 42,157 | 62.08% | |
| Total valid votes | | 40,576 | | |
| Registered electors | | 67,904 | | |
| INC hold | | Swing | | |

=== Assembly Election 1967 ===
1967 Mysore State Legislative Assembly election : Shiggaon
| Party | Candidate | Votes | % | ±% |
|---|---|---|---|---|
| INC | S. Nijalingappa | Unopposed | | |
| Registered electors | | 60,889 | | ▲12.90 |
| INC hold | | Swing | | |

=== Assembly Election 1962 ===
1962 Mysore State Legislative Assembly election : Shiggaon
| Party | Candidate | Votes | % | ±% |
|---|---|---|---|---|
| INC | Fakkirappa Shiddappa Taware | 20,838 | 75.93% | ▲13.52 |
| PSP | Fakkiragouda Tirakanagouda Patil | 6,606 | 24.07% | New |
| Margin of victory | | 14,232 | 51.86% | ▲27.03 |
| Turnout | | 29,229 | 54.19% | ▲0.05 |
| Total valid votes | | 27,444 | | |
| Registered electors | | 53,934 | | ▲11.04 |
| INC hold | | Swing | ▲13.52 | |

=== Assembly Election 1957 ===
1957 Mysore State Legislative Assembly election : Shiggaon
| Party | Candidate | Votes | % | ±% |
|---|---|---|---|---|
| INC | Patil Rudgragouda Chanbasangouda | 16,412 | 62.41% | ▼2.13 |
| Independent | Gadigeppagouda Chanbasangouda Patil | 9,884 | 37.59% | New |
| Margin of victory | | 6,528 | 24.83% | ▼14.23 |
| Turnout | | 26,296 | 54.14% | ▼3.98 |
| Total valid votes | | 26,296 | | |
| Registered electors | | 48,572 | | ▲5.31 |
| INC hold | | Swing | ▼2.13 | |

=== Assembly Election 1952 ===
1952 Bombay State Legislative Assembly election : Shiggaon
| Party | Candidate | Votes | % | ±% |
|---|---|---|---|---|
| INC | Hurali Koppi Mallappa Basappa | 17,302 | 64.54% | New |
| KMPP | Gadigeppagouda Chanbasangouda Patil | 6,831 | 25.48% | New |
| Independent | Kumbarkattimanigoudar, Rudragouda Sangangouda | 1,055 | 3.94% | New |
| Socialist Party (India) | Hotanhalli, Rangrao Venkatrao | 903 | 3.37% | New |
| Independent | Patil, Rudragouda Chanveergouda | 717 | 2.67% | New |
| Margin of victory | | 10,471 | 39.06% | |
| Turnout | | 26,808 | 58.12% | |
| Total valid votes | | 26,808 | | |
| Registered electors | | 46,122 | | |
| INC win (new seat) | | | | |

== See also ==
- List of constituencies of the Karnataka Legislative Assembly
- Haveri district
