= Hubli-Dharwad East Assembly constituency =

Legislative Assembly constituency in Karnataka State, India

Coordinates: 15.37°N 75.18°E

Hubli-Dharwad East
- Constituency No. 72 for the Karnataka Legislative Assembly

Constituency details
- Country: India
- Region: South India
- State: Karnataka
- District: Dharwad
- Lok Sabha constituency: Dharwad
- Established: 2008
- Total electors: 209,530
- Reservation: SC

Member of Legislative Assembly
- 16th Karnataka Legislative Assembly
- Incumbent Abbayya Prasad
- Party: Indian National Congress
- Elected year: 2023
- Preceded by: Veerabhadrappa Halaharavi

Hubli-Dharwad East Assembly constituency is one of the 224 Legislative Assembly constituencies of Karnataka in India.

It is part of Dharwad district and is reserved for candidates belonging to the Scheduled Castes. As of 2023, its representative is Abbayya Prasad of the Indian National Congress party. Muslims are the largest community, making up a near-majority, with Dalits the second-largest group.

== Members of the Legislative Assembly ==
Election	Member	Party
2008	Halaharavi Veerabadrappa	Bharatiya Janata Party
2013	Abbayya Prasad	Indian National Congress
2018	Abbayya Prasad	Indian National Congress
2023	Abbayya Prasad	Indian National Congress

== Election results ==
=== Assembly Election 2023 ===
2023 Karnataka Legislative Assembly election : Hubli-Dharwad East
Party	Candidate	Votes	%	±%
INC	Abbayya Prasad	85,426	57.47%	▲0.83
BJP	Dr. Kranthi Kiran	53,056	35.69%	▼5.17
AIMIM	Durgappa Kashappa Bijawad	5,644	3.80%	New
SDPI	Guntral Vijay Mahadevappa	1,360	0.91%	New
JD(S)	Halaharavi Veerabadrappa	900	0.61%	New
NOTA	None of the above	798	0.54%	▼0.39
Margin of victory		32,370	21.78%	▲6.01
Turnout		148,812	71.02%	▲0.89
Total valid votes		148,640		
Registered electors		209,530		▲7.89
INC hold		Swing	▲0.83	

=== Assembly Election 2018 ===
2018 Karnataka Legislative Assembly election : Hubli-Dharwad East
Party	Candidate	Votes	%	±%
INC	Abbayya Prasad	77,080	56.64%	▲20.54
BJP	Chandrashekar Gokak	55,613	40.86%	▲16.28
NOTA	None of the above	1,260	0.93%	New
Margin of victory		21,467	15.77%	▲4.24
Turnout		136,192	70.13%	▲7.55
Total valid votes		136,097		
Registered electors		194,209		▲11.39
INC hold		Swing	▲20.54	

=== Assembly Election 2013 ===
2013 Karnataka Legislative Assembly election : Hubli-Dharwad East
Party	Candidate	Votes	%	±%
INC	Abbayya Prasad	42,353	36.10%	▲4.90
BJP	Halaharavi Veerabadrappa	28,831	24.58%	▼19.78
KJP	Bijawad Shankarappa Kashappa	26,312	22.43%	New
JD(S)	Alkod Hanumanthappa. Y	8,431	7.19%	▼6.51
Independent	Venkappa F. Siddanath	850	0.72%	New
Margin of victory		13,522	11.53%	▼1.63
Turnout		109,103	62.58%	▲6.35
Total valid votes		117,311		
Registered electors		174,349		▲5.99
INC gain from BJP		Swing	▼8.26	

=== Assembly Election 2008 ===
2008 Karnataka Legislative Assembly election : Hubli-Dharwad East
Party	Candidate	Votes	%	±%
BJP	Halaharavi Veerabadrappa	41,029	44.36%	New
INC	F. H. Jakkappanavar	28,861	31.20%	New
JD(S)	Hirekerur Shivu Yallappa	12,667	13.70%	New
Independent	Durgappa Kashappa Bijawad	5,410	5.85%	New
Independent	Ramachandra Kalingappa Mahar	1,551	1.68%	New
BSP	Shobha Vasudev Ballari (Hukkeri)	799	0.86%	New
Rashtriya Hindustan Sena Karnataka	Sreenivas M. Harapanahalli	688	0.74%	New
SP	Govindraj Allappa Hariwan	599	0.65%	New
Margin of victory		12,168	13.16%	
Turnout		92,492	56.23%	
Total valid votes		92,490		
Registered electors		164,492		
BJP win (new seat)				

== See also ==
- List of constituencies of the Karnataka Legislative Assembly
- Dharwad district
