= Tanveer Sait =

Indian politician

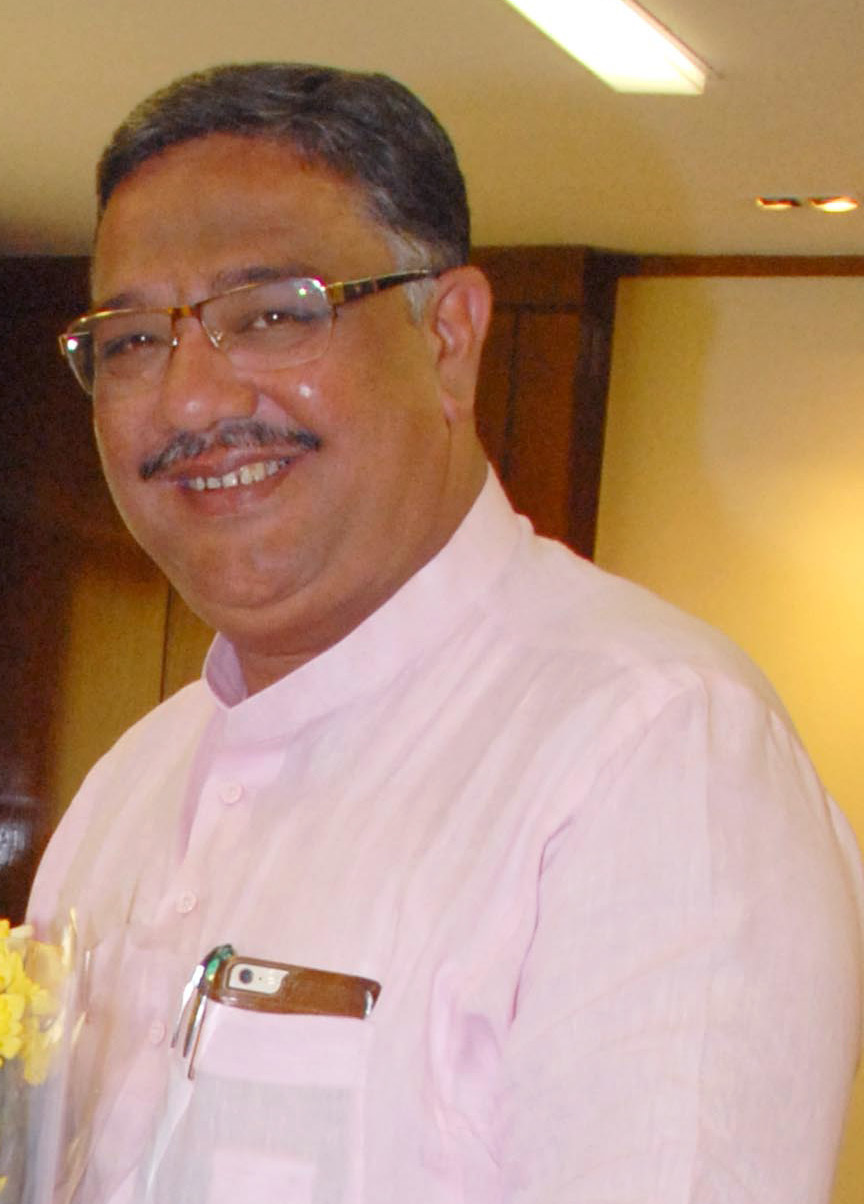

Minister of State for Primary and Secondary Education & Sakala of Karnataka
- In office 2016–2018
- Preceded by: Kimmane Rathnakar
- Succeeded by: N. Mahesh

Member of the Karnataka Legislative Assembly for Narasimharaja
- Incumbent
- Assumed office May 2002
- Preceded by: Azeez Sait
- Constituency: Narasimharaja

Personal details
- Born: 3 October 1967 (age 59) Mysuru, Mysuru State (present–day Karnataka), India
- Party: Indian National Congress
- Relations: Yasmin Sait (Sister) Kubbra Sait (niece); Danish Sait (nephew)
- Children: Javed Sait (son); Parveen Sait (daughter)
- Parent: Aziz Sait (father)
- Occupation: Politician, businessman
- Profession: Businessman

Tanveer Aziz Sait is an Indian politician who was the Minister of State for Primary and Secondary Education of Karnataka from 2016 to 2018. He is Member of the Karnataka Legislative Assembly from Narasimharaja constituency since May 2002. Sait is a six-term member of the Karnataka Legislative Assembly.

== Personal life ==
Sait is the son of prominent Muslim leader Aziz Sait.

== Career ==
Sait is from the Indian National Congress and represents the Narasimharaja constituency of Mysore, Karnataka. The constituency has been served by Sait's family for over five decades.

Sait's father Alhaj Aziz Sait was a veteran congress leader and held the Narasimharaja Assembly seat six times from 1967 to 1999. After the demise of Aziz Sait in December 2001 his political legacy, the Narasimharaja assembly seat led to a family feud in the Sait family as Tariq Sait grandson of Aziz Sait and nephew of Tanveer Sait campaigned for the Janata Dal (Secular) candidate Maruthi Rao Pawar in the 2002 Karnataka assembly election against his uncle Tanveer Sait.

In the 2002 by-election Sait won the Narasimharaja Assembly seat by above 10000 votes against Maruthi Rao Pawar from the Janata Dal (Secular). In the following election of 2004 Sait won the assembly seat by above 20000 against Maruthi Rao Pawar from the Janata Dal (Secular). In the 2008 assembly election Sait beat S. Nagaraju (Sandesh) of the Janata Dal (Secular) by about 6000 votes.

Sait is the sitting member of the Karnataka Legislative Assembly from Narasimharaja constituency as he retained the seat again in the 2013 assembly election winning against Abdul Majid K H of the Social Democratic Party of India by about 8000 votes. Sait won the 2018 Karnataka Legislative Assembly election from the Narasimharaja constituency defeating the Bharatiya Janata Party candidate by about 17000 votes.

== Ministry ==
While he was holding the Primary and Secondary Education Ministry portfolio, Tanveer Sait was also the chairman of the Karnataka Minorities Development Corporation Limited and in-charge of the Minority Welfare and Wakf department of Karnataka. As the Minister in-charge of Minority Welfare, he urged the Karnataka State Board of Wakfs to appoint an administrator to the Rifahul Muslimeen Educational Trust.

Tanveer Sait has been announced as minorities minister in the newly formed government of Karnataka under Mr. Siddaramaiah, a formal announcement is expected to be made on May 30, 2023. He will also be designated as the minister in charge of Mysore district.

== Controversy ==
Leading – Karnataka news channel TV9 (Kannada) reported that Sait was caught seeing "objectionable" pictures of women on his cellphone during the Tipu Jayanti celebrations in Raichur on 10 November 2016. Tanveer Sait was attacked by an unknown person in the early hours of Monday at an event in Mysuru. The MLA was attacked with a sharp knife, causing injuries on 18 November 2019. According to preliminary investigation, the accused has been identified as 20-year-old Farhaan from Mysuru.
