= Abbayya Prasad =

Indian politician

- ಅಬ್ಬಯ್ಯ ಪ್ರಸಾದ್‌

Member of the Karnataka Legislative Assembly
- Incumbent
- Assumed office 2013

Personal details
- Born: 2 July 1968 (age 58) Munirabad
- Party: Indian National Congress
- Education: Pre University Course
- Occupation: Politician

Abbayya Prasad is an Indian Politician who is serving as Member of the legislative assembly for Hubli-Dharwad East constituency.

He was appointed chairman for Karnataka State Slum Development Board on 26 January 2024.

== Constituency ==
He represents the Hubli-Dharwad-East constituency.

== Political Party ==
He is from the Indian National Congress.
