= Hubli-Dharwad Central Assembly constituency =

Legislative Assembly constituency in Karnataka State, India

Coordinates: 15.35°N 75.13°E

Hubli-Dharwad Central
- Constituency No. 73 for the Karnataka Legislative Assembly

Constituency details
- Country: India
- Region: South India
- State: Karnataka
- District: Dharwad
- Lok Sabha constituency: Dharwad
- Established: 2008
- Total electors: 249,371
- Reservation: None

Member of Legislative Assembly
- 16th Karnataka Legislative Assembly
- Incumbent Mahesh Tenginakai
- Party: Bharatiya Janata Party
- Elected year: 2023
- Preceded by: Jagadish Shettar

Hubli-Dharwad Central Assembly constituency is one of the 224 Legislative Assembly constituencies of Karnataka in India.

It is a part of Dharwad district and Dharwad Lok Sabha constituency.

== Members of the Legislative Assembly ==
Year	Member	Political party
2008	Jagadish Shettar	Bharatiya Janata Party
2013	Jagadish Shettar	Bharatiya Janata Party
2018	Jagadish Shettar	Bharatiya Janata Party
2023	Mahesh Tenginakai	Bharatiya Janata Party

== Election results ==
=== Assembly Election 2023 ===
2023 Karnataka Legislative Assembly election : Hubli-Dharwad Central
Party	Candidate	Votes	%	±%
BJP	Mahesh Tenginakai	95,064	59.27%	▲7.96
INC	Jagadish Shettar	60,775	37.89%	▲1.00
NOTA	None of the above	1,251	0.78%	▲0.08
Margin of victory		34,289	21.38%	▲6.96
Turnout		161,181	64.64%	▲3.67
Total valid votes		160,401		
Registered electors		249,371		▲2.73
BJP hold		Swing	▲7.96	

=== Assembly Election 2018 ===
2018 Karnataka Legislative Assembly election : Hubli-Dharwad Central
Party	Candidate	Votes	%	±%
BJP	Jagadish Shettar	75,794	51.31%	▲5.45
INC	Dr. Mahesh Nalwad	54,488	36.89%	▲5.02
JD(S)	Rajanna M. Koravi	10,754	7.28%	▲1.06
NOTA	None of the above	1,028	0.70%	New
Margin of victory		21,306	14.42%	▲0.43
Turnout		147,992	60.97%	▲5.64
Total valid votes		147,710		
Registered electors		242,736		▲14.40
BJP hold		Swing	▲5.45	

=== Assembly Election 2013 ===
2013 Karnataka Legislative Assembly election : Hubli-Dharwad Central
Party	Candidate	Votes	%	±%
BJP	Jagadish Shettar	58,201	45.86%	▼8.89
INC	Dr. Mahesh Nalwad	40,447	31.87%	▲1.36
JD(S)	Shams Tabrez Samsi	7,898	6.22%	▼4.91
KJP	S. S. Patil	5,481	4.32%	New
Independent	Sirajahmed Mulla	967	0.76%	New
Margin of victory		17,754	13.99%	▼10.25
Turnout		117,400	55.33%	▼3.07
Total valid votes		126,910		
Registered electors		212,179		▲15.43
BJP hold		Swing	▼8.89	

=== Assembly Election 2008 ===
2008 Karnataka Legislative Assembly election : Hubli-Dharwad Central
Party	Candidate	Votes	%	±%
BJP	Jagadish Shettar	58,747	54.75%	New
INC	Munavalli Shankranna Ishwarappa	32,738	30.51%	New
JD(S)	Koravi. M. M. (Rajanna)	11,938	11.13%	New
Independent	Lakkundi Rahimansab Khadarsab	1,089	1.01%	New
BSP	Premanath Chikkatumbal	808	0.75%	New
Margin of victory		26,009	24.24%	
Turnout		107,348	58.40%	
Total valid votes		107,301		
Registered electors		183,818		
BJP win (new seat)				

== See also ==
- List of constituencies of the Karnataka Legislative Assembly
- Dharwad district
