= Fakruddinsab Hussensab Mohsin =

Indian politician

Member of Legislative Council (MLC) - Mysore Legislative Council.
- In office 1956–1957

Member of Legislative Assembly (MLA) - Karnataka Legislative Assembly.
- In office 1957–1962

Member of Parliament, Lok Sabha
- In office 1962–1984
- Preceded by: Thimmappa Rudrappa Newsi
- Succeeded by: Azeez Sait
- Constituency: Dharwad South Lok Sabha constituency

Personal details
- Born: 23 January 1923 Hiremadapur village, Rattihalli, Haveri district (thenDharwad district), Karnataka
- Died: 3 September 1996 (aged 73) Bangalore, Karnataka
- Party: Indian National Congress
- Spouse: Rahamatunnissa (3 May 1953)
- Children: 4 sons and 3 daughters
- Parent: Hussainsab
- Education: D.A.. LL.B
- Alma mater: Karnatak College Dharwad and Sykes Law College, Kolhapur
- Profession: Advocate

Fakruddin Hussain Mohsin (23 January 1923 – 3 September 1996), often shortened as F. H. Mohsin, was an Indian politician and Freedom Fighter. He was 5-time Member of Parliament (MP), and represented Dharwad South in the Lok Sabha the lower house of the Parliament of India. He was also Member of Parliamentary Delegation to U.A.R., Sudan and Algeria.

== Early life and background ==
Mohsin was born on 23 January 1923 in Hiremadapur village, in Hirekerur Taluk, Dharwad district. Hussainsab was his father. He completed his schooling in D.A.. LL.B from Ranebennur Municipal High School, Basel Mission High School Dharwad, Karnatak College Dharwad and Sykes Law College, Kolhapur.

== Personal life ==
Mohsin married Rahamatunnissa on 3 May 1953 and the couple has four sons and three daughters.

== Freedom Movement ==
Mohsin actively participated in the freedom movement by organising the students.

== Lok Sabha ==
Mohsin contested and won the Dharwad South seat in Karnataka for five consecutive Lok Sabha elections, making him the only parliamentarian to be elected five times from that constituency.

Election	Lok Sabha	Party	Votes	Result
1962	3rd Lok Sabha	Indian National Congress	—	Elected
1967	4th Lok Sabha	Indian National Congress	—	Elected
1971	5th Lok Sabha	Indian National Congress (R)	—	Elected
1977	6th Lok Sabha	Indian National Congress	239,210	Elected
1980	7th Lok Sabha	Indian National Congress (Indira)	226,083	Elected

In the 1977 election, he secured 239,210 votes, and in the 1980 election, he won with 226,083 votes.

=== Union Deputy Minister of Home Affairs ===
During the Third Indira Gandhi ministry, Mohsin was appointed as the Union Deputy Minister of Home Affairs on 2 May 1971, serving throughout the duration of the ministry until 24 March 1977. His tenure as deputy home minister coincided with the Emergency period (1975–1977), during which the Ministry of Home Affairs played a central role in implementing the government's emergency measures.

He is described as having been a staunch disciple of former Prime Minister Indira Gandhi, and his rise to a central ministerial position was attributed to his close association with her and the Congress party leadership.

=== Other parliamentary roles ===
In the 7th Lok Sabha, Mohsin served as the Chairman of the House Committee in 1980, a role responsible for maintaining order and decorum within the Lok Sabha. He was also a member of the Parliamentary Delegation to the U.A.R., Sudan, and Algeria, representing India in parliamentary diplomatic engagements with these countries.

== Death ==
He died in Bangalore on 3 September 1996, at the age of 73.

== Legacy ==
Mohsin remains the only parliamentarian to have been elected five times from the Dharwad South constituency and the sole Union minister from that constituency. The constituency, later renamed Haveri after delimitation in 2008, commemorates his long and distinguished parliamentary career.
