= Shiggaon =

- City
- Location in Karnataka, India
- Coordinates: 14.991°N 75.223°E
- Country: India
- State: Karnataka
- District: Haveri

Government
  - MLA: Yasir Ahmed Khan Pathan
- Elevation: 601 m (1,972 ft)

Population (2011)
  - Total: 35,678

Languages
  - Official: Kannada
- Time zone: UTC+5:30 (IST)
- PIN: 581205
- Telephone code: 08378
- Vehicle registration: KA-27
- Website: shiggaontown.mrc.gov.in

Shiggaon, is a municipal town in Haveri district in the Indian state of Karnataka.

== Geography ==
Shiggaon is about 365 km from Bengaluru and 465 km from Pune on the NH-48 (National Highway 4).

Shiggaon taluk was earlier in Dharwad district. In the year 1997–98, Dharwad district was divided into three districts: Dharwad with five taluks (Dharwad, Hubli, Kalghatgi, Kundgol and Navalgund), Gadag district with five taluks (Gadag, Ron, Nargund, Mundargi and Shirahatti) and Haveri district with seven taluks (Haveri, Byadgi, Ranebennur, Hirekerur, Hangal, Shiggaon and Savanur).

Shiggaon taluk is bounded by Dharwad district in the North, Savanur taluk in the East, Hangal taluk in the South and Mundagod Taluk of Uttara Kannada district in the West. Shiggaon taluk has 91 villages, 25 Gram Panchayats and 2 City Municipal Councils (Shiggaon and Bankapur). The taluk lies between North latitude 14’.28o to 14’.59o and East longitude 75’.07o to 75’.38o.

The area of the taluk is 588 km^{2}. The taluk possesses a forest area of 9951 hectares which is about 16.88% of the total geographical area. Irrigation is available in the taluk. Agriculture is the main occupation.

== Demographics ==
As of 2011 India census, Shiggaon had a population of 35,678. Males constitute 51% of the population and females 49%. Shiggaon has an average literacy rate of 59%, lower than the national average of 59.5%: male literacy is 65%, and female literacy is 53%. In Shiggaon, 14% of the population is under 6 years of age.

== Tourist attractions ==
- Bankapur Nagaresvara Temple (454 AD)
- Santa Shishunala Sharif Sannidhi, Shishuvinahala
- Sanathan Subramanya temple, Aratal (This is the original Subramanya temple located in South India), This location is mentioned in Shiva Purana.
- "Utsav Rock Garden", Gotagodi
- Sri Santh Kanaka Das palace of birth (Baada).
- Bankapur peacock sanctuary
- Shree Panch Pandav temple & Suryanarayana Temple At Bannikoppa 5 km from shiggaon
- Naganur Lake.
- Solar Power plant (More than 1000 Hector land) outskirt of shiggaon near Gotagodi.
- Tadas Gayatri Thapobhumi Temple
- Wind mills for study purposes for students.

== Notable personalities ==
- Sudha Murthy, co-founder of Infosys.
- Basavaraj Bommai, 23rd Chief Minister of Karnataka.
- S. R. Bommai, 11th Chief Minister of Karnataka and Former Union Minister
- Syed Azeempeer Khadri, MLA of Shiggaon Assembly constituency
- Yasir Ahmed Khan Pathan, MLA of Shiggaon Assembly constituency
