= Adavisomapur, Gadag =

- Village
- Location in Karnataka, India Adavisomapur, Gadag (India)
- Coordinates: 15.390°N 75.656°E
- Country: India
- State: Karnataka
- District: Gadag
- Talukas: Gadag

Government
  - Body: Village Panchayat

Languages
  - Official: Kannada
- Time zone: UTC+5:30 (IST)
- ISO 3166 code: IN-KA
- Vehicle registration: KA
- Nearest city: Gadag
- Civic agency: Village Panchayat
- Website: karnataka.gov.in

Adavisomapur (Gadag) is a village in the southern state of Karnataka, India. It is located in the Gadag taluk of Gadag district in Karnataka.

== See also ==
- Gadag
- Districts of Karnataka
