= Mahesh Tenginakai =

Indian politician (born 1971)

Mahesh Tenginakai (born 2 January 1971) is an Indian politician from Karnataka. He is a member of the Karnataka Legislative Assembly from Hubli-Dharwad Central Assembly Constituency in Dharwad District. He won the 2023 Karnataka Legislative Assembly election representing Bharatiya Janata Party defeated former chief minister Jagadish Shettar, who quit BJP after he was denied a ticket.

== Early life and education ==
Tenginakai hails from the Lingayat community in Hubli. He completed his intermediate, the pre-university course. He is a businessman.

== Career ==
Tenginakai was associated with the BJP for over two decades but made his debut in electoral politics only in 2023. He was elected as an MLA from Hubli-Dharwad Central Assembly Constituency winning the 2023 Karnataka Legislative Assembly Election by a huge margin. He defeated former chief minister Jagadish Shettar, who contested on Indian National Congress Party ticket by a margin of 34,289 votes. Shettar, a six-time MLA, was denied a ticket by BJP and he shifted to Congress but lost the seat.

In February 2025, he criticised the allotment of land in Hubli-Dharwad for the construction of a district Congress party office at a concessional rate and questioned the financial priorities of the Congress government. The Karnataka cabinet approved the land, belonging to the Hubballi-Dharwad Municipal Corporation, worth Rs.5.6 crore for Rs.28 lakhs.
