= Social Democratic Party of India =

- Abbreviation: SDPI
- President: M. K. Faizy
- Secretary: Alphonse Franko
- General Secretary: Elyas Muhammad Thumbe
- Founder: Erappungal Abubacker
- Founded: 21 June 2009; 17 years ago
- Headquarters: C-4, Hazrat Nizamuddin West New Delhi, India-110013
- Labour wing: SDTU (Social Democratic Trade Union)
- Political position: Right wing
- Colours: Green and red
- ECI status: Registered, unrecognized

Party flag
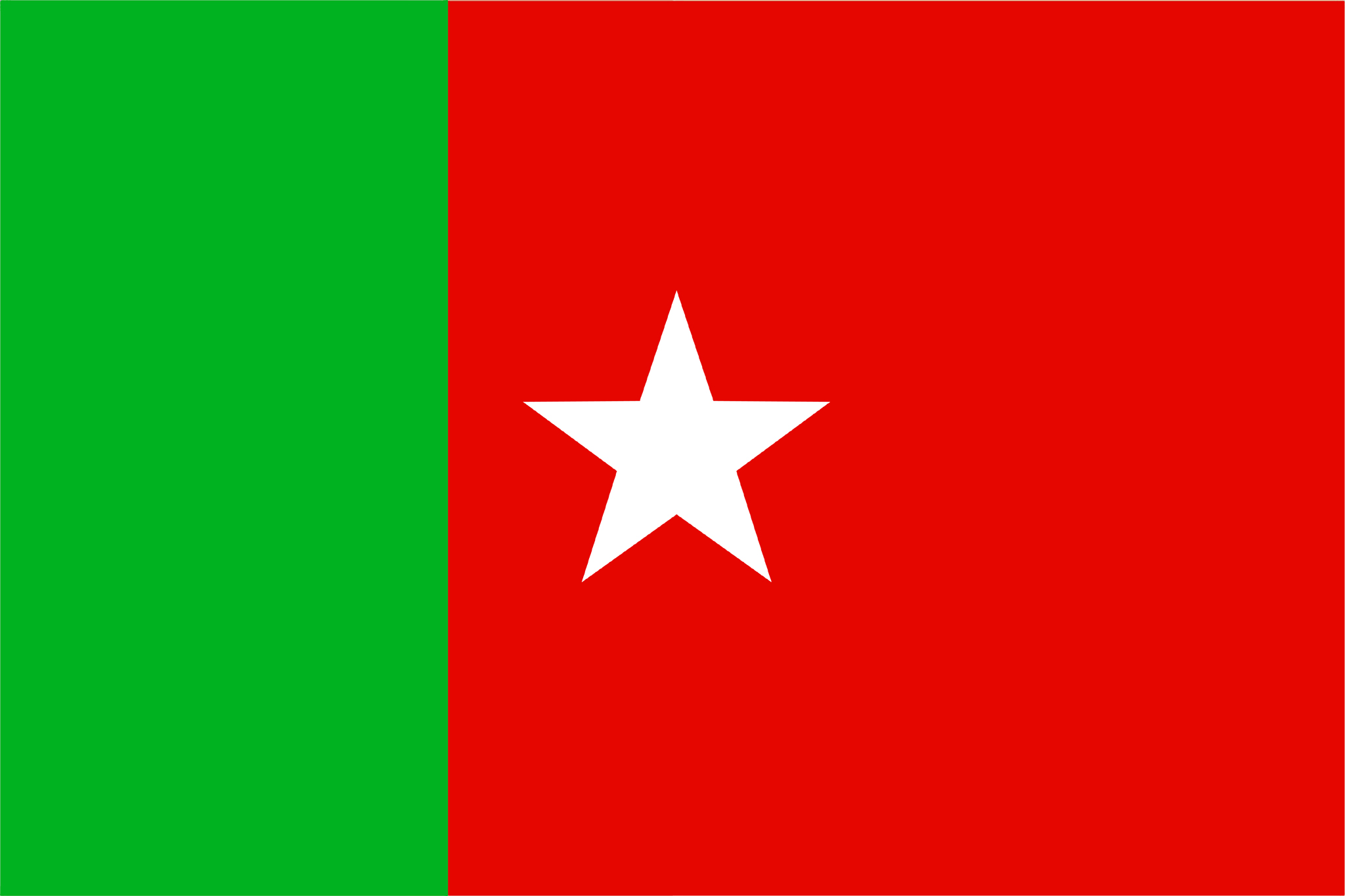

Website
- sdpi.in

Social Democratic Party of India, popularly known as SDPI, is an Indian political party founded on 21 June 2009 by Erappungal Abubacker in New Delhi.

== History and ideology ==
SDPI had emerged in order to establish justice for a large number of extremely marginalized people including Muslims, Dalits, tribals, women and some sections of the backward communities putting forth the slogan of “Freedom from Hunger, Freedom from Fear” in its manifesto which was released in first National Delegates Meet on 18 October 2009.

== Activities ==
=== Protests against Citizenship Amendment Act ===
The SDPI held protests across India against the Citizenship Amendment Act (CAA), and burned copies of the bill. In Coimbatore, Tamil Nadu, members of SDPI hoisted national flags at their homes and shops. Kerala CM Pinarayi Vijayan accused the party of using the CAA protests to create division.

The SDPI supported protesting farmers in Delhi, and conducted statewide protests in Tamil Nadu, Karnataka, and Kerala. On 26 January 26, 2021 in Coimbatore, Tamil Nadu, party members carried a coffin made from banana leaves, bamboo trees, and vegetables to demonstrate that the farm laws do not safeguard the farmers' interests. In Karnataka, SDPI members and others rallied in Belthangady to support the farmers' protest.

=== Road demand ===
In February 2016, around 30 SDPI members attempted to hold a "sleeping protest" in front of the Divisional Office of the Department of Highways, demanding the repair of the Palayamkottai–Papanasam road in Tamil Nadu. Other political parties and the public had repeatedly appealed to the Department of Highways to have the 52-kilometre (32 mi) stretch of road re-laid. Officials had ignored the demands, wanting to re-lay only the stretches used by ministers and other VIPs during Tamil Nadu Governor Konijeti Rosaiah's visit to Manonmaniam Sundaranar University.

=== Protest against demolition of Babri Mosque ===
In December 2016, the SDPI organized a nationwide campaign demanding the reconstruction of Babri Masjid on its original site; the mosque had been demolished in December 1992. During the campaign, the Dakshina Kannada SDPI district president was arrested for inciting communal hatred with a skit about the demolition. Protests were held in Tamil Nadu, Delhi, and Karnataka.

In March 2016, Mathrubhumi reprinted an offensive comment about Muhammad which had been initially posted on Facebook. The newspaper was forced to apologise after the party and other organizations protested outside Mathrubhumi's offices, saying that the post "hurt the sentiments of the community".

=== COVID-19 pandemic ===
On 28 April 2020, the Tamil Nadu SDPI filed public interest litigation (PIL) in the Madras High Court requesting the transport home of Tabligh Jamaat attendees from the state who were stranded in Delhi and other states. On 13 May 2020, the court directed the Tamil Nadu government to arrange transport and a quarantine facility for attendees stranded in Delhi.

The party also filed PIL in Madras High Court on 16 April 2020 alleging media bias in coronavirus news, seeking adherence with the Supreme Court's order to publish official information on the pandemic.

== Regional presence ==
The SDPI has organisational structure in 17 Indian states: Kerala, Tamil Nadu, Karnataka, Andhra Pradesh, Goa, Maharashtra, Puducherry, Madhya Pradesh, Uttar Pradesh, Jharkhand, West Bengal, Bihar, Gujarat, Delhi, Rajasthan, Haryana, Manipur. The party has state- and district-level committees in most of the states, and has been a presence in recent elections. The party won 14 seats in four municipalities in a 2010 local election in Kerala. It received over 24,000 votes in the Jangipur parliamentary election in Bengal, and won a seat in Goa. The SDPI did not win a seat in Karnataka, but the state party president noted its alliances with the Bahujan Samaj Party, Janata Dal (United) and the Lok Janshakti Party.

== Charges and accusations ==
=== Extremism ===
Two orthodox Sunni groups accused the SDPI of extremism after the murder of a university student.

=== Murders of CPI-M, Youth League and Congress workers ===
Nine PFI and SDPI activists were found guilty of killing a Communist Party of India (Marxist) (CPI-M) worker in 2008. SDPI activists were found guilty of murdering a Muslim Youth League worker in Kozhikode. SDPI members were arrested for the murder of a Congress worker in Chavakkad. Several SDPI offices have been raided by the Kerala Police. Suspected weapons-training camps and arms stockpiles were seized in Narath, Kannur district from the offices and other centres of the PFI and SDPI. Although the party denied any involvement, the charge sheet filed by the National Investigation Agency (NIA) blamed the PFI and the SDPI for conducting arms-training camps across Kerala as health-awareness camps and yoga classes. According to the FIR, the 24 people accused in the case were members of the PFI and the SDPI. Cases were registered under sections 143, 147, 153(B), R/W 149 of the IPC, section 5(1)(a) r/w 25(1)(a) of Arms Act, section 4 of the Explosives Act and section 18 of the Unlawful Activities (Prevention) Act.

Four SDPI activists were arrested for an attack on two CPI(M) members in Mangalam, Tirur on 29 January 2014. The SDPI accepted responsibility after a video of the violent attack was aired by major television channels. The party justified the attacks, however, saying that it needed to safeguard its members. According to the SDPI district president, the attack was an emotional reaction by its members to a CPM attack on one of its members that morning.

=== Murder of RSS members ===
A 23-year-old member of the Rashtriya Swayamsevak Sangh (RSS), a right-wing Hindutva paramilitary organisation, was killed in February 2021, allegedly by SDPI workers. The Bharatiya Janata Party, closely affiliated with the RSS, observed a hartal to protest the killing. In December of that year, SDPI state secretary K. S. Shan was hacked to death by a group affiliated with the RSS. BJP leader Ranjith Sreenivasan was then murdered in his home; police speculated that Sreenivasan's murder was connected to the previous two. SDPI leaders were arrested during the following days and all the accused were given capital punishment by the court.

== Controversy ==
=== 2014 Independence Day ===
A private school in Karicode, Kerala, removed "Vande Mataram" from their 2014 Independence Day programme after SDPI workers threatened to disrupt the programme; some of the song's words, they said, opposed Muslim religious beliefs. Fearing trouble, school authorities dropped the national song and a namaste gesture from a dance number. The issue sparked protests from the youth organisations of several parties. The SDPI justified the changes to the programme, saying that the party approached the school after several parents complained that some words in "Vande Mataram" and the namaste gesture opposed their religious beliefs.

=== 2020 Bangalore riots ===
On the night of 11 August 2020, violent clashes took place in the city of Bangalore, Karnataka. Provoked by an inflammatory Facebook post about Muhammad which was shared by the nephew of Indian National Congress state legislator Akhanda Srinivas Murthy, a crowd of Muslims arrived at his house for a protest which turned violent. Clashes between police and the crowd spread to the KG Halli and DJ Halli police stations. A curfew was imposed, and three people were killed after police opened fire on the crowd. Dozens of police officers and several journalists were injured by armed assailants, and Murthy's property was torched during the violence. The following day, over 100 people were arrested. Some protesters were reportedly led by SDPI members, and several party leaders were arrested.

=== Sedition charges ===
On 31 December 2020, SDPI workers had sedition charges filed against them, for allegedly shouting "Pakistan Zindabad". The SDPI denied the allegations.

=== Hijab dispute ===
Hijabs were brought to the attention of Karnataka media by Ansar Ahmed, district president of Karnataka Rakshana Vedike. The Campus Front of India (CFI), the student wing of the PFI, threatened a protest; this prompted the junior college to request a police presence. The SDPI also reportedly threatened to protest. College authorities met with the parents, and remained firm in their resolution not to allow religious attire.

== Electoral presence ==
=== General elections ===
==== 2014 ====
The SDPI fielded 29 candidates in six states. The party's 2014 Election Manifesto raised several issues about domestic and foreign policies, including popular needs, democratic rights, eradication of corruption, SCs/STs, minorities, a new national water policy, implementation of Ranganath Mishra Commission and Sachar Committee reports, and full literacy by 2020.

In Kerala, the party ran candidates in Ponnani and Malappuram. In Karnataka, the SDPI – supported by Janata Dal (Secular) – contested in Dakshina Kannada. The JD-S extended its support "on the principles and ideologies laid by the party at the time of its (SDPI's) birth". Of the parties who contested the 2014 Indian general election in Kerala, the SDPI had the highest number of candidates (14 out of 20) with criminal charges. In the 16th Lok Sabha election, the party received 0.07 percent of the vote and did not win any seats.

==== 2019 ====
The party contested for 15 seats in six states (Kerala, Karnataka, Tamil Nadu, Andhra Pradesh, West Bengal, and Delhi) in the 2019 Lok Sabha elections. In Andhra Pradesh, the SDPI contested for one Lok Sabha seat and fielded two candidates in the Legislative Assembly elections. In Karnataka's Dakshina Kannada constituency, the SDPI received 46,839 votes (3.48 per cent of the vote). In Tamil Nadu, the SDPI allied with T. T. V. Dhinakaran's AMMK party in the Central Chennai constituency. SDPI national vice president KKSM Dehlan Baqavi received 23,741 votes (3.02 per cent).

=== State Legislative Assembly elections ===
==== Karnataka (2013) ====
In the May 2013 Karnataka Legislative Assembly election, the SDPI contested for 24 seats; seven were in Dakshina Kannada district, and five were in Bangalore. Party state president Abdul Majeed stood against three-time legislator and former minister Tanveer Sait in Narasimharaja, a constituency dominated by Muslims. Majeed lost the election by 8,370 votes, finishing second.

==== Tamil Nadu (2016) ====
The SDPI contested independently for 30 seats in the May 2016 Tamil Nadu Legislative Assembly election with a gas-cylinder party symbol. The party received 65,978 votes (0.15 per cent), and did not win any seats.

==== Kerala (2016) ====
The 2016 Kerala Legislative Assembly election was held on 16 May to elect representatives of 140 constituencies. The SDPI fielded candidates independently in 89 constituencies; it received 0.61 per cent of the vote, and did not win any seats.

==== Karnataka (2018) ====
The SDPI declared Abdul Majeed its candidate from the Narasimharaja constituency in the 2018 Karnataka Legislative Assembly election, but Majeed failed to win.

Karnataka (2023)

The SDPI contested on only 16 seats out of the initial plan to contest in 100 constituencies in Karnataka Assembly elections 2023.

=== Local body elections ===
The SDPI contested the 2022 Tamil Nadu urban local body elections, and won one ward in the Coimbatore Municipal Corporation election.

SDPI contested in 2018 Ullal City Municipal elections and won 6 wards out of 31. SDPI also won 2 wards out of 60 in 2019 Mangalore City Corporation elections. SDPI has governments in few panchayats as well in Dakshina Kannada district of Karnataka.

== See also ==
- List of political parties in India
