= Syed Azeempeer Khadri =

Indian politician

Chairman of Hubballi Electricity Supply Company Limited (HESCOM)
- Incumbent
- Assumed office 26 November 2024
- Constituency: Shiggaon

Member of Karnataka Legislative Assembly
- In office 1999–2004

Personal details
- Born: June 1, 1964 (age 62) Karnataka, India
- Party: Indian National Congress
- Children: Sayed Momin Badshah Khadri
- Parent: Sayed Khadar Basha (father)
- Education: 12th Pass
- Occupation: Politician, Businessman
- Profession: Agriculturist, Businessman

Syed Azeempeer Khadri (born 1 June 1964) is an Indian politician from Karnataka, India. He is currently serving as the Chairman of Hubballi Electricity Supply Company Limited (HESCOM), a position he assumed on 26 November 2024 following a government order issued soon after the Model Code of Conduct was lifted.

Khadri previously served as a Member of the Karnataka Legislative Assembly, representing the Shiggaon constituency from 1999 to 2004.

He is affiliated with the Indian National Congress and has been an active figure in state politics, particularly in the Haveri district. In the 2024 by-election, Khadri initially filed as an independent candidate after being denied a Congress ticket but later withdrew his nomination and extended support to the party’s official candidate following discussions with senior leaders.

Apart from his political career, Khadri has a background in agriculture and business.

He fought 2008, 2013 and 2018 Karnataka Legislative Assembly election but lost to Basavaraj Bommai.
