= Yasir Ahmed Khan Pathan =

Indian politician

Member of Karnataka Legislative Assembly
- Incumbent
- Assumed office 2024
- Preceded by: Basavaraj Bommai
- Constituency: Shiggaon

Personal details
- Political party: Indian National Congress
- Profession: Politician

Yasir Ahmed Khan Pathan is an Indian politician. A member of the Indian National Congress, he is a member of the Karnataka Legislative Assembly since 2024, representing Shiggaon Assembly constituency.

== See also ==
- List of chief ministers of Karnataka
- Karnataka Legislative Assembly
