= I.G. Sanadi =

Indian politician

Imam Ghouse Sanadi (born 18 February 1939) is an Indian politician and educationist coming from Karnataka. As a member of the Indian National Congress, he represented the Dharwad South constituency in the Lok Sabha, which is the lower house of India's Parliament. He first made his mark in the Lok Sabha in 1996 and was re-elected for another term in 1999. Before his time in the Lok Sabha, he also served in the Karnataka Legislative Assembly and was a member of the Rajya Sabha.

== Early life and education ==
Sanadi was born in Shirhatti in the Dharwad region of Karnataka to Goususaheb Sanadi. He pursued higher education at Karnataka College and Karnatak University in Dharwad, where he obtained a Master of Arts degree and the qualification of Rashtra Bhasha Praveen.

Professionally, he dabbled in a variety of fields, from agriculture and journalism to teaching and educational administration. He even took on the role of principal at Nehru Arts and Science College in Hubli. In 1965, Sanadi married Zaibuneesa Begum, and together they built a family with four sons and two daughters. When he's not busy with work, Sanadi likes to read books or travel the world. He visited places like Canada, France, Germany, the United Arab Emirates, the United Kingdom, the United States, and Russia.

== Political career ==
=== State politics ===
Sanadi entered politics through the state legislature and served as a member of the Karnataka Legislative Assembly from 1972 to 1978. During this period he also served as Vice Chairman of the Committee on the Comprehensive Bill on Education (1975–1978).

He later became President of the Dharwad District Congress Committee, a position he held from 1978 to 1991.

=== Parliamentary career ===
Sanadi was elected to the Rajya Sabha in 1990, representing Karnataka in the upper house of Parliament. In 1996, he was elected to the 11th Lok Sabha from the Dharwad South constituency. During his tenure in Parliament he served on several committees, including:

1. Standing Committee on Human Resource Development
2. Joint Committee on Offices of Profit
3. Consultative Committee for the Ministry of Power and Non-Conventional Energy Sources
4. Committee on Official Languages

He also participated in parliamentary discussions relating to education and language policy. Sanadi was later again elected to the Lok Sabha in 1999, marking his second term as a Member of Parliament.

== Other roles and activities ==
He also served as a Second Lieutenant in the National Cadet Corps (NCC) and contributed to educational and cultural initiatives in Karnataka. Outside electoral politics, Sanadi held several academic and cultural positions, including:

1. Member of the Senate of Karnatak University
2. Member of the SSLC Examination Board
3. Member of the Karnataka Janapada Academy
4. Member of the Programme Advisory Committee of All India Radio
5. Member of the court of Aligarh Muslim University

== Public engagement and views ==
Sanadi delivered radio talks on social, educational, and religious issues, and promoted ideals such as communal harmony and social peace. He also participated in public and commemorative events in the Dharwad region even after his parliamentary career.

== Electoral history ==
1. 1996: Elected to the 11th Lok Sabha from Dharwad South
2. 1998: Contested the Lok Sabha election from Dharwad South but finished second
3. 1999: Re-elected to the Lok Sabha from Dharwad South
4. 2004: Contested again but lost the election

The Dharwad South Lok Sabha constituency, which he represented, was later abolished after the 2008 delimitation of parliamentary constituencies.
