= Krishna ministry =

State government of Karnataka, India (1999–2004)

- 23rd Ministry of the State of Karnataka
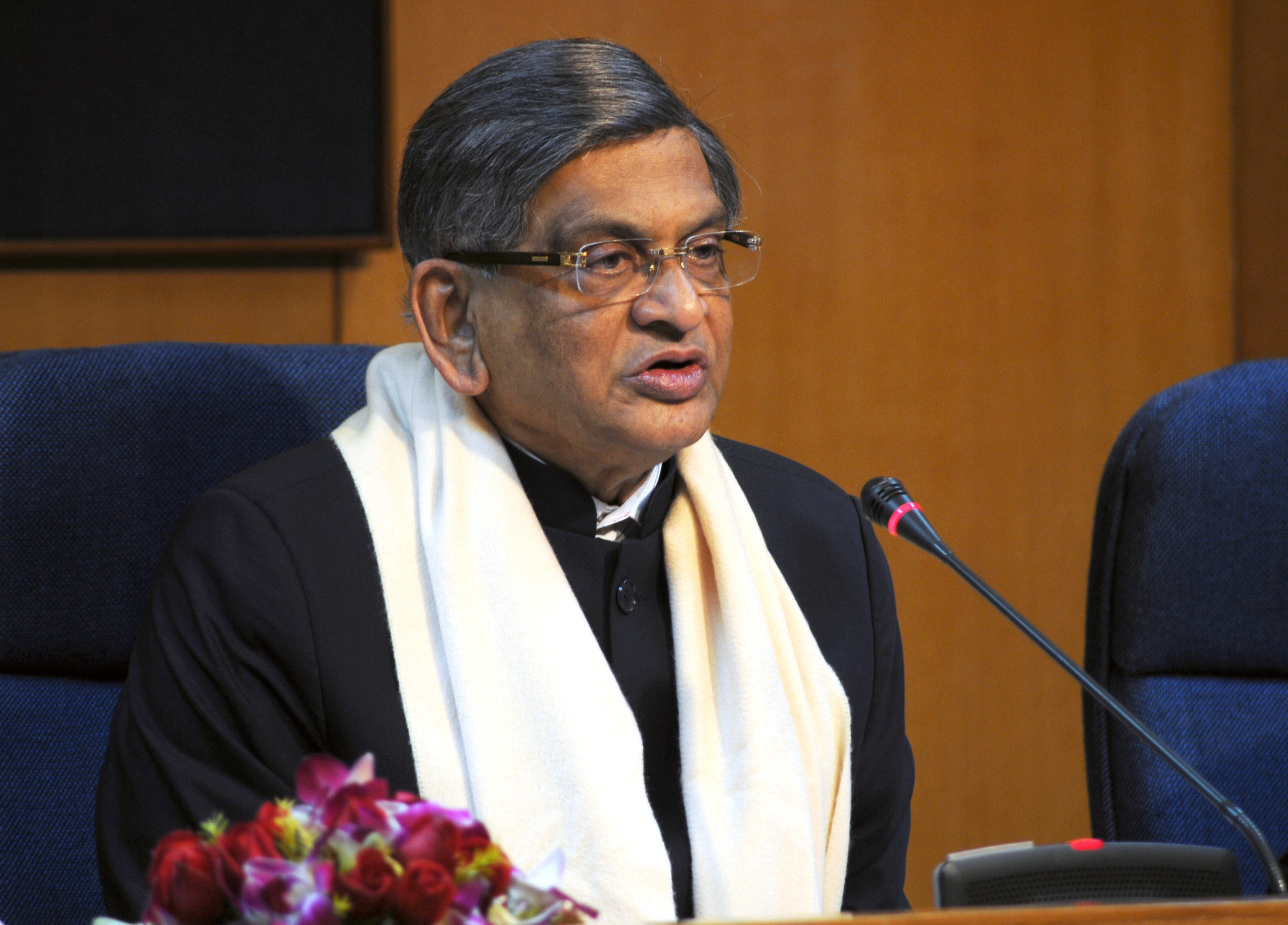
- S. M. Krishna; Hon'ble Chief Minister of Karnataka
- Date formed: 11 October 1999
- Date dissolved: 28 May 2004

People and organisations
- Head of state: Khurshed Alam Khan (6 January 1992 – 2 December 1999); V. S. Ramadevi (2 December 1999 – 20 August 2002); T. N. Chaturvedi (21 August 2002 – 20 August 2007)
- Head of government: S. M. Krishna
- No. of ministers: 48
- Member parties: INC
- Status in legislature: Majority
- Opposition party: BJP
- Opposition leader: Jagadish Shettar (assembly)

History
- Election: 1999
- Outgoing election: 2004
- Legislature term: 4 years 8 months
- Predecessor: J. H. Patel ministry
- Successor: Dharam Singh ministry

The S. M. Krishna ministry was the Council of Ministers in Karnataka, a state in South India headed by S. M. Krishna that was formed after the 1999 Karnataka elections.

In the government headed by Krishna, the Chief Minister was from Indian National Congress. Apart from the Chief Minister, there were other ministers in the government.

== Tenure of the Government ==
In 1999, as Karnataka Pradesh Congress Committee president, S. M. Krishna led the Indian National Congress (INC) to victory in the assembly polls and took over as Chief Minister of Karnataka on 11 October 1999, a post he held until 2004.

On 17 October 1999, Krishna ministry expanded 41 ministers took oath.

On 17 December 2001, mini reshuffle occurred.

On 27 June 2002, major reshuffle occurred.

He was also instrumental in creating power reforms with ESCOMS and digitization of land records (Bhoomi) and many other citizen-friendly initiatives. He encouraged private-public participation and was a forebearer of the Bangalore Advance Task Force.

== Council of Ministers ==
Sr. No.	Name	MLA/MLC	Constituency	Designation	Portfolio(s)	Party	Term of Office	
Sr. No.	Name	MLA/MLC	Constituency	Designation	Portfolio(s)	Party	Took Office	Left Office
Chief Minister
1.	S. M. Krishna	MLA	Maddur	Chief Minister	Finance; Cabinet Affairs; DPAR; BMRDA; Other departments not allocated to a Minister.	INC	11 October 1999	28 May 2004
Cabinet Minister
2.	Mallikarjun Kharge	MLA	Gurmitkal	Cabinet Minister	Home	INC	17 October 1999	28 May 2004
2.	Mallikarjun Kharge	MLA	Gurmitkal	Cabinet Minister	Minor Irrigation	INC	27 June 2002	28 May 2004
3.	Dharam Singh	MLA	Jevargi	Cabinet Minister	Public Works Department	INC	17 October 1999	28 May 2004
4.	M. Y. Ghorpade	MLA	Sandur	Cabinet Minister	Rural Development; Panchayati Raj	INC	17 October 1999	28 May 2004
5.	D. B. Chandregowda	MLA	Shringeri	Cabinet Minister	Law; Parliamentary Affairs	INC	17 October 1999	28 May 2004
6.	T. B. Jayachandra	MLA	Kallambella	Cabinet Minister	Agriculture	INC	17 October 1999	27 June 2002
6.	T. B. Jayachandra	MLA	Kallambella	Cabinet Minister	Food & Civil Supplies	INC	12 December 2003	28 May 2004
7.	Kagodu Thimappa	MLA	Sagar	Cabinet Minister	Social Welfare	INC	17 October 1999	27 June 2002
7.	Kagodu Thimappa	MLA	Sagar	Cabinet Minister	Health and Family Welfare	INC	27 June 2002	28 May 2004
8.	H. C. Srikantaiah	MLA	Shravanabelagola	Cabinet Minister	Revenue	INC	17 October 1999	28 May 2004
9.	H. K. Patil	MLC	West Graduates Constituency	Cabinet Minister	Major and Medium Irrigation	INC	17 October 1999	11 December 2003
9.	H. K. Patil	MLC	West Graduates Constituency	Cabinet Minister	Agriculture	INC	12 December 2003	28 May 2004
10.	R. V. Deshpande	MLA	Haliyal	Cabinet Minister	Large and Medium Industries Industries	INC	17 October 1999	28 May 2004
11.	K. H. Ranganath	MLA	Hiriyur	Cabinet Minister	Forests	INC	17 October 1999	28 May 2004
12.	C. R. Sageer Ahamed	MLA	Chikmagalur	Cabinet Minister	Sugar	INC	17 October 1999	27 June 2002
12.	C. R. Sageer Ahamed	MLA	Chikmagalur	Cabinet Minister	Housing	INC	27 June 2002	28 May 2004
13.	D. K. Shivakumar	MLA	Sathanur	Cabinet Minister	Co-operation	INC	17 October 1999	27 June 2002
13.	D. K. Shivakumar	MLA	Sathanur	Cabinet Minister	Urban Development	INC	27 June 2002	28 May 2004
14.	Adagur H. Vishwanath	MLA	Krishnarajanagara	Cabinet Minister	Primary Education	INC	17 October 1999	27 June 2002
14.	Adagur H. Vishwanath	MLA	Krishnarajanagara	Cabinet Minister	Cooperation	INC	27 June 2002	28 May 2004
15.	R. Roshan Baig	MLA	Jayamahal	Cabinet Minister	Tourism; Haj	INC	17 October 1999	27 June 2002
15.	R. Roshan Baig	MLA	Jayamahal	Cabinet Minister	Small Scale Industries; Haj	INC	27 June 2002	28 May 2004
16.	M. Mahadev	MLA	Nanjangud	Cabinet Minister	Sericulture; Textiles	INC	17 October 1999	27 June 2002
16.	M. Mahadev	MLA	Nanjangud	Cabinet Minister	Animal Husbandary; Sugar	INC	27 June 2002	28 May 2004
17.	Motamma	MLA	Mudigere	Cabinet Minister	Women and Child Welfare	INC	17 October 1999	28 May 2004
18.	Ramanath Rai	MLA	Bantwal	Cabinet Minister	Fisheries; Ports	INC	17 October 1999	27 June 2002
18.	Ramanath Rai	MLA	Bantwal	Cabinet Minister	Transport	INC	27 June 2002	28 May 2004
19.	V. Muniyappa	MLA	Sidlaghatta	Cabinet Minister	Mines; Geology	INC	17 October 1999	28 May 2004
20.	A. B. Malakareddy	MLA	Yadgir	Cabinet Minister	Health and Family Welfare	INC	17 October 1999	27 June 2002
20.	A. B. Malakareddy	MLA	Yadgir	Cabinet Minister	Medical Education	INC	27 June 2002	28 May 2004
21.	Qamar ul Islam	MLA	Gulbarga	Cabinet Minister	Housing	INC	17 October 1999	27 June 2002
21.	Qamar ul Islam	MLA	Gulbarga	Cabinet Minister	Labour	INC	27 June 2002	28 May 2004
22.	A. Krishnappa	MLA	Varthur	Cabinet Minister	Secondary Education	INC	17 October 1999	27 June 2002
22.	A. Krishnappa	MLA	Varthur	Cabinet Minister	Social Welfare	INC	27 June 2002	28 May 2004
23.	B. S. Patil Sasnur	MLA	Huvina Hippargi	Cabinet Minister	Agricultural Marketing	INC	17 October 2001	28 May 2004
24.	R. B. Timmapur	MLA	Mudhol	Minister of State (I/C)	Agricultural Marketing	INC	17 October 1999	17 December 2001
24.	R. B. Timmapur	MLA	Mudhol	Cabinet Minister	Planning	INC	17 December 2001	28 May 2004
25.	Kote M. Shivanna	MLA	Heggadadevankote	Minister of State (I/C)	Kannada and Culture	INC	17 October 1999	17 December 2001
25.	Kote M. Shivanna	MLA	Heggadadevankote	Cabinet Minister	Information	INC	17 December 2001	27 June 2002
25.	Kote M. Shivanna	MLA	Heggadadevankote	Cabinet Minister	Horticulture	INC	27 June 2002	12 December 2003
25.	Kote M. Shivanna	MLA	Heggadadevankote	Cabinet Minister	Cauvery Basin Irrigation	INC	12 December 2003	28 May 2004
26.	V. S. Koujalagi	MLA	Arabhavi	Cabinet Minister	Agriculture	INC	27 June 2002	12 December 2003
26.	V. S. Koujalagi	MLA	Arabhavi	Cabinet Minister	Horticulture	INC	12 December 2003	28 May 2004
27.	H. M. Revanna	MLA	Magadi	Cabinet Minister	Sericulture; Textiles	INC	27 June 2002	28 May 2004
27.	H. M. Revanna	MLA	Magadi	Cabinet Minister	Infrastructure and Civil Aviation	INC	12 December 2003	28 May 2004
28.	Ramalinga Reddy	MLA	Jayanagar	Cabinet Minister	Food and Civil Supplies	INC	27 June 2002	12 December 2003
28.	Ramalinga Reddy	MLA	Jayanagar	Cabinet Minister	Bangalore Development	INC	12 December 2003	28 May 2004
29.	G. Parameshwara	MLA	Madhugiri	Minister of State (I/C)	Higher Education	INC	17 October 1999	27 June 2002
29.	G. Parameshwara	MLA	Madhugiri	Minister of State (I/C)	Science and Technology	INC	17 October 1999	18 August 2001
29.	G. Parameshwara	MLA	Madhugiri	Minister of State (I/C)	Medical Education	INC	18 August 2001	27 June 2002
29.	G. Parameshwara	MLA	Madhugiri	Cabinet Minister	Higher Education	INC	27 June 2002	28 May 2004
29.	G. Parameshwara	MLA	Madhugiri	Cabinet Minister	Information	INC	12 December 2003	28 May 2004
30.	D. B. Inamdar	MLA	Kittur	Minister of State (I/C)	Food and Civil Supplies	INC	17 October 1999	27 June 2002
30.	D. B. Inamdar	MLA	Kittur	Minister of State (I/C)	Information Technology; Tourism	INC	27 June 2002	12 December 2003
30.	D. B. Inamdar	MLA	Kittur	Cabinet Minister	Information Technology and Biotechnology	INC	12 December 2003	28 May 2004
31	J. Alexander	MLA	Bharathinagar	Cabinet Minister	Tourism	INC	12 December 2003	28 May 2004
32.	Raja Amareshwara Naik	MLA	Kalmala	Minister of State	Horticulture	INC	17 December 2001	27 June 2002
32.	Raja Amareshwara Naik	MLA	Kalmala	Minister of State	Home Guards, Civil Defence and Legal Metrology	INC	27 June 2002	12 December 2003
32.	Raja Amareshwara Naik	MLA	Kalmala	Cabinet Minister	Home Guards, Civil Defence and Legal Metrology	INC	12 December 2003	28 May 2004
33.	Kumar Bangarappa	MLA	Nanjangud	Minister of State (I/C)	Minor Irrigation	INC	17 October 1999	27 June 2002
33.	Kumar Bangarappa	MLA	Nanjangud	Minister of State (I/C)	Municipal Administration	INC	27 June 2002	28 May 2004
34.	B. K. Chandrashekhar	MLC	MLAs	Minister of State (I/C)	Information; Publicity	INC	17 October 1999	27 June 2002
34.	B. K. Chandrashekhar	MLC	MLAs	Minister of State (I/C)	Primary and Secondary Education	INC	27 June 2002	28 May 2004
35.	Baburao Chinchansur	MLA	Chittapur	Minister of State (I/C)	Small Savings	INC	17 October 1999	28 May 2004
35.	Baburao Chinchansur	MLA	Chittapur	Minister of State (I/C)	Muzrai	INC	17 October 1999	27 June 2002
35.	Baburao Chinchansur	MLA	Chittapur	Minister of State (I/C)	Lotteries, Insurance & Agro-processing	INC	12 December 2003	28 May 2004
36.	Suma Vasanth	MLA	Virajpet	Minister of State (I/C)	Planning	INC	17 October 1999	27 June 2002
36.	Suma Vasanth	MLA	Virajpet	Minister of State (I/C)	Muzrai	INC	27 June 2002	28 May 2004
37.	S. S. Mallikarjun	MLA	Davanagere	Minister of State (I/C)	Youth affairs; Sports	INC	17 October 1999	28 May 2004
38.	Allum Veerabhadrappa	MLA	Kurugodu	Minister of State	Horticulture; Agriculture	INC	17 October 1999	15 March 2001
38.	Allum Veerabhadrappa	MLA	Kurugodu	Minister of State	Krishna Basin Irrigation	INC	12 December 2003	28 May 2004
39.	M. Diwakar Babu	MLA	Bellary	Minister of State	Rural development; panchayati raj	INC	17 October 1999	27 June 2002
39.	M. Diwakar Babu	MLA	Bellary	Minister of State	Cooperation	INC	27 June 2002	28 May 2004
40.	Nafees Fazal	MLC	MLAs	Minister of State	Medical education	INC	17 October 1999	18 August 2001
40.	Nafees Fazal	MLC	MLAs	Minister of State	Science and Technology	INC	18 August 2001	28 May 2004
41.	M. Malikarjun Nagappa	MLA	Kanakagiri	Minister of State	Urban Development	INC	17 October 1999	27 June 2002
41.	M. Malikarjun Nagappa	MLA	Kanakagiri	Minister of State	Revenue	INC	27 June 2002	28 May 2004
42.	Mundanda M. Nanaiah	MLA	Madikeri	Minister of State	Excise	INC	17 October 1999	28 May 2004
43.	Rani Satish	MLC	MLAs	Minister of State	Parliamentary affairs	INC	17 October 1999	27 June 2002
43.	Rani Satish	MLC	MLAs	Minister of State (I/C)	Kannada and Culture	INC	27 June 2002	28 May 2004
44.	Baburao Chavan	MLA	Shahabad	Minister of State (I/C)	Adult Education, Libraries, printing and Stationery	INC	27 June 2002	28 May 2004
45.	Basavaraj H. Patil	MLC	Bidar Local Authorities	Minister of State (I/C)	Energy	INC	27 June 2002	28 May 2004
46.	M. Ustad	MLA	Bijapur	Minister of State (I/C)	Minorities Welfare; Waqf	INC	27 June 2002	28 May 2004
47.	Vasanth V. Salian	MLA	Kapu	Minister of State (I/C)	Fisheries; Ports	INC	27 June 2002	28 May 2004
48.	K. B. Koliwad	MLA	Ranibennur	Minister of State (I/C)	Rural Water Supply	INC	27 June 2002	28 May 2004
49.	K N Gaddi	MLA	Navalgund	Minister of State	Forests	INC	27 June 2002	28 May 2004

If the office of a Minister is vacant for any length of time, it automatically comes under the charge of the Chief Minister.

== Former Ministers ==
Sr. No.	Name	MLA/MLC	Constituency	Designation	Portfolio(s)	Party	Term of Office		Reason
Sr. No.	Name	MLA/MLC	Constituency	Designation	Portfolio(s)	Party	Took Office	Left Office	Reason
1.	S. R. Kashappanavar	MLA	Hungund	Cabinet Minister	Small Scale Industries	INC	17 October 1999	27 June 2002	Dropped
2.	B. B. Chimmanakatti	MLA	Badami	Cabinet Minister	Urban Development	INC	17 October 1999	27 June 2002	Dropped
3.	Abdulhakim Hindasgari	MLC	Dharwad Local Authorities	Cabinet Minister	Labour; Waqf	INC	17 October 1999	27 June 2002	Dropped
4.	Veerakumar Appaso Patil	MLC	MLAs	Minister of State	Energy	INC	17 October 1999	27 June 2002	Dropped
5.	T. John	MLC	Kodagu Local Authorities	Minister of State	Infrastructure development and civil aviation; Large and Medium Industries	INC	17 October 1999	31 January 2001	Resigned
5.	T. John	MLC	Kodagu Local Authorities	Minister of State	Bangalore Development Authority	INC	17 December 2001	27 June 2002	Resigned
5.	T. John	MLC	Kodagu Local Authorities	Minister of State	Infrastructure Development and Civil Aviation	INC	27 June 2002	12 December 2003	Resigned
6.	G. Raju Gouda	MLA	Hanur	Minister of State (I/C)	Agro Processing	INC	27 June 2002	12 December 2003	Resigned

== See also ==
- Karnataka Legislative Assembly
