= SSIT =

SSIT may refer to:

- Sri Siddhartha Institute of Technology, Tumkur
