= G. Parameshwara =

Indian politician (born 1951)

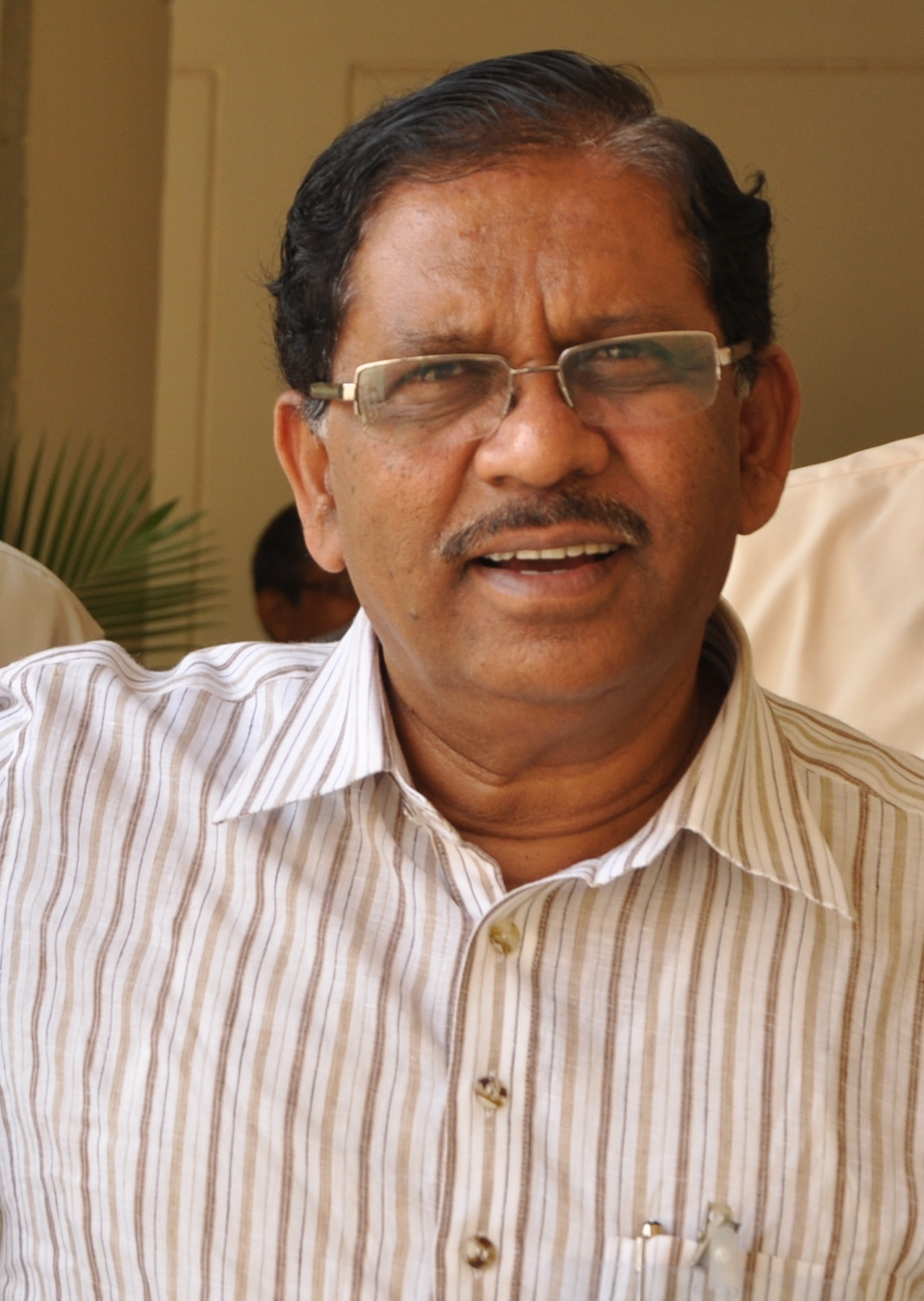

7th Deputy Chief Minister of Karnataka
- Incumbent
- Assumed office 3 June 2026
- Governor: Thawar Chand Gehlot
- Chief Minister: D. K. Shivakumar
- Portfolio(s): Revenue, Youth Empowerment and Sports
- Preceded by: D. K. Shivakumar (Dy. Chief Minister); Krishna Byre Gowda (Revenue); Siddaramaiah (Sports and Youth Affairs)
- In office 23 May 2018 – 23 July 2019
- Governor: Vajubhai Rudabhai Vala
- Chief Minister: H. D. Kumaraswamy
- Preceded by: R. Ashok; K. S. Eshwarappa
- Succeeded by: Govind M. Karjol; C. N. Ashwath Narayan; Laxman Savadi

Minister of Home Affairs of Karnataka
- In office 27 May 2023 – 29 May 2026
- Governor: Thawar Chand Gehlot
- Chief Minister: Siddaramaiah
- Preceded by: Araga Jnanendra
- Succeeded by: Priyank Kharge
- In office 30 October 2015 – 24 June 2017
- Governor: Vajubhai Rudabhai Vala
- Preceded by: K. J. George
- Succeeded by: Ramalinga Reddy

Leader of the House in Karnataka Legislative Council
- In office 1 July 2016 – 24 June 2018
- Governor: Vajubhai Rudabhai Vala
- Preceded by: S. R. Patil
- Succeeded by: Jayamala Ramachandra

President of the Karnataka Pradesh Congress Committee
- In office 27 October 2010 – 4 July 2018
- Preceded by: R. V. Deshapande
- Succeeded by: Dinesh Gundu Rao

Minister of Information & Publicity of Karnataka
- In office 13 December 2003 – 28 May 2004
- Governor: T. N. Chaturvedi
- Chief Minister: S. M. Krishna
- Preceded by: Prof. B.K. Chandrashekar
- Succeeded by: B. Shivaram

Minister of State for Medical Education of Karnataka
- In office 18 August 2001 – 28 May 2004
- Governor: V. S. Ramadevi; T. N. Chaturvedi
- Chief Minister: S. M. Krishna
- Preceded by: Nafees Fazal
- Succeeded by: Iqbal Ansari

Minister of State for Science & Technology of Karnataka
- In office 11 October 1999 – 18 August 2001
- Governor: Khurshed Alam Khan; V. S. Ramadevi
- Chief Minister: S. M. Krishna
- Succeeded by: Nafees Fazal

Minister of State for Higher Education (Independent Charge) of Karnataka
- In office 11 October 1999 – 28 May 2004
- Governor: Khurshed Alam Khan; V. S. Ramadevi; T. N. Chaturvedi
- Chief Minister: S. M. Krishna
- Preceded by: Bajpe Abdul Khader Mohideen
- Succeeded by: D Manjunath

Minister of State for Sericulture of Karnataka
- In office 19 November 1992 – 11 December 1994
- Governor: Khurshed Alam Khan
- Chief Minister: M. Veerappa Moily
- Preceded by: Y. K. Ramaiah
- Succeeded by: D. Nagarajaiah

Personal details
- Born: Parameshwara Gangadharaiah; 6 August 1951 (age 75) Gollahalli, Mysore State, India (present-day Karnataka)
- Party: Indian National Congress (since 1989)
- Spouse: Kannika Parameshwari Parameshwara (m. 1982)
- Children: Shana Parmeshwar (1988)
- Education: Gandhi Krishi Vigyana Kendra UAS (B. Sc.), (M. Sc.).; The Waite Research Institute University of Adelaide (PhD).
- Occupation: Politician; Agricultural scientist
- Website: Official Website

Gangadharaiah Parameshwara (born 6 August 1951) is an Indian politician who is currently serving as the seventh Deputy Chief Minister of Karnataka, as well as the Revenue and Sports Minister of Karnataka. He is the longest-serving President of the Karnataka Pradesh Congress Committee, having served for two consecutive terms.

== Early life and education ==
Parameshwara was born on 6 August 1951, at Gollahalli (now known as Siddartha Nagar) in Tumkur. He was born to Gangamalamma Chikkanna and former MLC H. M. Gangadharaiah. Gangadharaiah hailed from Hebbalalu village in Kothagere hobli of Kunigal taluk, now in Magadi taluk of Ramanagara district, before shifting to Gangamalamma's village Gollahalli in Tumakuru rural, Parameshwara is the third sibling after older brother Dr. G. Shivaprasad.

He studied primary education at Government School in Gollahalli (Siddartha Nagara) and Heggere, Tumkur. He went to Sri Siddhartha High School at Siddartha Nagar, which was established by his father in 1959. He joined Government Pre-University College in Tumkur and after Pre-University College went on to study for a B.Sc. in agriculture in the University of Agricultural Sciences, Bangalore, followed by an M.Sc. in agriculture at the same college. After Post-Graduating, Parameshwara had briefly worked as Research Assistant in Department of Plant Physiology at the University of Agricultural Sciences, Bangalore. Later, Parameshwara went overseas and obtained a PhD from Waite Agricultural Research Centre, the University of Adelaide in Plant Physiology.

He joined the National Cadet Corps (India) at an early age. He was an athlete, has a record 10.9 seconds of 100 metres race in University of Agricultural Sciences, Bangalore. He represented Gandhi Krishi Vignana Kendra College in Inter-College/University and Karnataka state in Indian level.

He stood 4th in the world inter university athletic championship in Belgrade and got selected to train for the Olympics. By then he received national overseas scholarships and decided to pursue academics. Even today Dr. G Parameshwara holds the highest regard for Krishna Hebbar, PhD in physical education from Moscow who trained and encouraged him in his initial days as an athlete.

== Career ==
Parameshwara was an administrative officer in Sri Siddhartha Institute of Technology (SSIT Tumkur) when he came back from Australia. Before this, he briefly worked as a research assistant in the Department of Plant Physiology at UAS, Bangalore.

In mid-1988, he helped his father to establish Sri Siddhartha Medical College, Hospital & Research Centre, which was earlier rejected by Medical Council of India & Ramakrishna Hegde's Government, but Bangalore University had approved and later Supreme Court of India gave permission to sanction the college.

In 1989, for the inauguration of the Sri Siddhartha Medical College, Parameshwara, along with Education Minister S. M. Yahya, and Mallikarjun Kharge who was then president of the Sri Siddhartha Education Society, invited Prime Minister Rajiv Gandhi. When Parameshwara went for the third time with Yahya to meet Gandhi, Gandhi told Parameshwara to enter politics. Eventually S. M. Yahya took Parameshwara to then AICC general secretary Mohsina Kidwai and made him joint secretary of Karnataka Pradesh Congress Committee.

=== Political career ===
G. Parameshwara

Political career

Member of Legislative Assembly
- Incumbent
- Assumed office 15 May 2018
- Preceded by: P. R. Sudhakara Lal
- Constituency: Koratagere
- In office 30 May 2008 – 12 May 2013
- Preceded by: C. Channigappa
- Succeeded by: Sudhakara Lal P. R.
- Constituency: Koratagere
- In office 11 October 1999 – 19 November 2007
- Preceded by: Gangahanumaiah
- Succeeded by: President's rule
- Constituency: Madhugiri
- In office 18 December 1989 – 20 September 1994
- Preceded by: President's rule
- Succeeded by: Gangahanumaiah
- Constituency: Madhugiri

Member of Legislative Council
- In office 1 July 2014 – 24 May 2018
- Constituency: Elected unopposed

- In 1989 Parameshwara won against his nearest rival C. Rajavardhan of Janata Dal in Madhugiri Constituency.
- In 1993, Parameshwara served as Minister of State for Sericulture during Veerappa Moily cabinet.
- In 1999, Parameshwara set a record in the 1999 election to the Assembly from Madhugiri by winning the seat by a margin of 55,802 votes. It was the biggest victory margin in the elections that year. He polled 71,895 votes and his runner up Gangahanumaiah of Janata Dal (Secular) secured only 16,093 votes. Parameshwara's poll was the highest in the state during 1999 election.
- From 1999 to 2004, he has served as Minister of State (Independent Charge) for Higher Education and Science & Technology portfolios also as Tumkur district incharge Minister in S. M. Krishna Cabinet.
- On 18 August 2001, he was inducted as Minister of State for Medical Education (attached to health minister) exchanging Science & Technology for Medical Education with Nafees Fazal.
- On 27 June 2002, Parameshwara was promoted to cabinet rank by then Chief Minister S. M. Krishna citing that they needed younger face in politics.
- On 13 December 2003, he was inducted as Minister of Information & Publicity succeeding Prof. B.K. Chandrashekar.
- In 2004, Parameshwara won against his nearest rival Kenchamaraiah H. of Janata Dal (Secular) in Madhugiri.
- From 2007 to 2009, Dr. G. Parameshwara served as Congress Working Committee Member.
- In 2008, he represented Koratagere as winning against runner up Chandraiah of Janata Dal (Secular).
- On 27 October 2010, he was appointed the President of Karnataka Pradesh Congress Committee replacing R. V. Deshapande.
- On 1 July 2014, he got elected to Legislative Council.
- On 30 October 2015, he was appointed Home Minister of Karnataka replacing K. J. George.
- On 15 January 2016, Dr. G. Parameshwara was appointed Chikmagalur district incharge Minister.
- On 24 June 2017, he resigned as Home Minister along with District incharge Minister of Chikmagalur district to look after state campaign, He also handed over Chairman of Campaign Committee of KPCC to D. K. Shivakumar and remained President of KPCC for the second term.
- On 15 May 2018, Dr. G. Parameshwara won from Koratagere constitution as elected MLA candidate.
- On 23 May 2018, Dr. G. Parameshwara took oath as the Deputy Chief Minister of Karnataka.
- On 8 June 2018, Dr. G. Parameshwara took incharge of "Home Department of Karnataka (excluding Intelligence), Bengaluru Development (BBMP, BDA, BWSSB, BMRDA, Directorate of Town Planning from Urban Development Department) and Youth Empowerment & Sports Department".
- On 31 July 2018, Dr. G. Parameshwara was appointed District-incharge Minister of Bangalore Urban and Tumkur District.
- On 28 December 2018, Dr. G. Parameshwara had to part with The Home Minister portfolio & The Youth Empowerment and Sports portfolio in order to balance the regional wise distribution of Minister Posts, Dr. G. Parameshwara continued to hold the coveted Bengaluru Development ministry alongside three more portfolios "IT, BT, and Science and Technology; Law, Justice and Human Rights; and Parliamentary Affairs and Legislation".
- On 1 August 2022, All-India Congress Committee president Sonia Gandhi appointed Dr. G. Parameshwara as the chairman of the 'Manifesto, Policy and Vision Committee 2023', for the Karnataka Pradesh Congress Committee for preparing the party's manifesto for the 2023 Karnataka Legislative Assembly election.
- On 13 May 2023, Dr. G. Parameshwara won as a Member of the Legislative Assembly against runner-up P R Sudhakar Lal in the Koratagere constituency.

== Ministerial career ==
=== Education Minister (1999–2004) ===
==== Karnataka State Akkamahadevi Women's University ====
As the Higher Education Minister, Parameshwara piloted the amendment to the Karnataka State Universities Bill 2003, which led to the establishment of a separate Women's University in Bijapur. This university will serve as an affiliating university for 12 regions in North Karnataka and will be the seventh women's university in the country, following those in Mumbai, Tirupathi, Kodaikanal, Jammu, Rajasthan, and Coimbatore. Notably, it will be the first affiliating women's university in the country.

==== Tumkur University ====
Parameshwara was chairman on board for Karnataka State Universities Act, 2000 and then he was Higher Education minister in S. M. Krishna Cabinet who piloted a Bill (Amending Act 10 of 2004) in February 2004 for an exclusive University in Tumkur.

This act carved out half of Bangalore University to make Tumkur University at Tumkur for Tumkur, Kolar and Bangalore Rural. In the beginning, they created Dr. Ambedkar Bhavan for office purposes about 3 years as 200 acres land for the university wasn't available in Tumkur. Later vast land of Govt. Science & Arts College was used for University.

On 12 January 2007, Tumkur University was inaugurated by Governor T. N. Chaturvedi and Chief Minister H. D. Kumaraswamy after 3 years of passing Bill. It was delayed due to lack of infrastructure and funds from the successor coalition government and then Chief Minister Dharam Singh who had announced the withdrawal of the government order which froze the setting up of Tumkur university.

==== Reservation for women in teachers recruitment ====
Speaking at the Teachers Day celebration organised by the directorate of collegiate education, Parameshwara said the government had already commenced recruitment of college teachers. "We would like it to be 50 per cent for women. We are considering it," he said. He signed a memorandum of understanding (MoU) with the Australian Government for teachers to undertake an exchange programme for faculty improvement.

==== Madhugiri Regional Education Block ====
In SM Krishna tenure, Parameshwara created a new educational block for Madhugiri which comprised Madhugiri, Koratagere, Sira and Pavagada.

=== Home Minister (2015–2017) ===
==== MoU with Bavaria Police, Germany ====
Parameshwara signed MoU with Germany's Bavaria Police to improve Department of Home Affairs of Karnataka. A detailed study of the Bavarian system of policing was conducted during his visit to Germany. He said, "In Bavaria, top priority is given to the safety of women, children and senior citizens. They have successfully implemented a people-friendly policing system. Over 82% of the population in Bavaria is happy with the system. The same model will be implemented in Bengaluru". As per the MoU, police personnel from Bengaluru will be sent to Bavaria for training. Bavarian officials will also visit Bengaluru for this purpose. Awareness will be raised among schoolchildren on traffic and law and order with the help of Bavarian Police.

==== Karnataka Police (Amendment) Bill, 2016 ====
Sexual harassment incidents involving children occurred frequently, and despite police registering cases, conducting investigations, and submitting final reports to the courts, negligence by both staff and school management was evident in nearly all cases. To address and regulate the activities of school staff and management to ensure the safety and security of children, G. Parameshwara, the then Home Minister, made amendments to the Karnataka Police Act of 1963. The clause now reads, "Regulating, controlling, and monitoring the safety and security of children." Defending its move, the government responded in the assembly that the act would empower the police with more authority for the effective monitoring of situations in schools.

==== Marine Training Academy ====
He set up a coastal police academy over 25 acres in Udupi, and also noted that the regular police currently being appointed to the coastal units were not trained for swimming in the ocean or handling other work specific to their area of operation. "So now we intend to make separate recruitments for the coastal police and train them at the academy," he said.

==== Hi-tech Hoysalas to patrol city roads for Bengaluru ====
Introduced in 1997 during J. H. Patel term, Parameshwara upgraded it during his term as Home Minister in Siddaramaiah cabinet. Upgraded with 222 Maruti Ertiga vehicles, they were monitored and controlled from the Hoysala control room attached to the Command Centre, which works as centralised unit for monitoring complaints received at the control room and social networking sites.

=== Deputy chief minister (2018–2019) ===
==== Science City, Mysore ====
Parameshwara proposed Science City for Mysore, the first in South India, In joint collaboration by the Government of India and Government of Karnataka. The land was given by Suttur Mutt. "The Science City, which will come up at a cost of Rs 200 crore, will emerge as the biggest city in south India." said by Dr. G. Parameshwara, Suttur Mutt offered 25 acres for this project.

==== MoU with SweepSmart, Netherlands ====
On 1 June 2019, Parameshwara signed a MoU with Netherland company SweepSmart to provide better infrastructure to BBMP's 10 existing waste facilities in the city to "Smart Waste Centres" with their smart equipment, site lay-out, processes and KPI dashboard.

==== MoU with 3Wayste SAS, France ====
Parameshwara signed a MoU with 3Wayste SAS, France to improve waste segregation in BBMP, Bangalore.

==== ISRO in Tumkur ====
Parameshwara demanded the loss making HMT's Land to Indian Space Research Organisation when the NDA-led Union government decided to close HMT on 30 April 2016, Parameshwara appealed to hand it over to ISRO instead of private companies. Parameshwara praised S.P. Muddahanumegowda, MP, for succeeding in handing over the land to ISRO. it would later create more than 4,000 jobs in the district and will boost the economy of the district. G. Parameshwara thanked Prime Minister Narendra Modi for establishing ISRO and HAL units in the Tumakuru district.

==== TenderSURE roads for Bangalore ====
Parameshwara got TenderSURE roads to Bangalore Under the CBD project, major roads, including Subedar Chatram Road: from KG Road up to Seshadri Road, Gubbi Totadappa Road: from Khoday Circle via Goods Shed Road junction up to KG Road, Dhanvantari Road: from Upparpet police station to Anand Rao Circle, WH Hanumanthappa Road, roads around Gandhinagar, Bhashyam Road (Cottonpete Main Road) have been developed. A total of 9.73 km have been upgraded under the project.

==== FTVR app ====
Parameshwara launched a Field Traffic Violation Report (FTVR) app in 2017, which greatly helped the cops crack down on violators in some of the major junctions and roads across Hubballi Darwad twin cities. This app became an integral part of their mechanism since August 2019.

=== Home minister (2023–present) ===
==== Karnataka Police (Amendment) Bill, 2024 ====
Parameshwara introduced the Karnataka Police (Amendment) Bill, 2024, which amends the Karnataka Police Act to extend the minimum tenure for police officers in operational roles from one year to two years. This amendment aims to enhance the effectiveness of policing and reduce corruption related to postings. The new rule applies to officers holding the ranks of Additional Director-General of Police on field duty, Inspector General of Police, Superintendents of Police in charge of districts, Additional Superintendents of Police on operational duties, and Circle Inspectors and Sub-Inspectors in charge of police stations. The one-year tenure had previously been a hindrance, especially for officers at the Inspector level, as frequent transfers prevented them from becoming familiar with their jurisdictions, thereby impacting the efficiency of law enforcement, crime detection, and intelligence gathering. However, some officers, particularly in Bengaluru, managed to stay in preferred postings for extended periods, which could lead to the development of vested interests. The amendment aims to strike a balance by providing stability for officers while ensuring that they gain experience in both urban and rural areas. The government is also tasked with addressing the issue of officers who have remained in specific posts for too long, despite the political influence they may wield.

=== Controversial statements ===
He faced criticism after making a controversial remark about a Bengaluru woman's harassment case, saying, 'Incidents like these tend to happen here and there in a big city like this.' However, he later apologised for his statement.

== Positions in political party ==
#	From	To	Position
01	1989	1992	Joint secretary, KPCC
02	1992	1997	General secretary, KPCC
03	1997	1999	Vice-president, KPCC
04	2007	2009	Member, Congress Working Committee
05	2010	2018	President, KPCC
06	2010	2017	Chairperson of Campaign Committee, KPCC
07	2022	present	Chairperson of Manifesto, Policy and Vision Committee 2023, KPCC

== Minister in different ministries ==
No.	Head of the ministry	Period	Portfolio
1	M. Veerappa Moily	19 November 1992 – 11 December 1994	Minister of State for Sericulture
2	S. M. Krishna	11 October 1999 – 28 May 2004; 11 October 1999 – 18 August 2001; 18 August 2001 – 28 May 2004; 13 December 2003 – 28 May 2004	Minister of State for Higher Education (Independent Charge); Minister of State for Science & Technology; Minister of State for Medical Education; Minister of Information & Publicity
3	Siddaramaiah	30 October 2015- 24 June 2017	Home Minister of Karnataka
4	H. D. Kumaraswamy	23 May 2018 - 23 July 2019	Deputy Chief Minister of Karnataka
5	Siddaramaiah	20 May 2023 - 3 June 2026	Home Minister of Karnataka
6	D. K. Shivakumar	3 June 2026 -	Deputy Chief Minister of Karnataka; Revenue; Sports

== Personal life ==
Parameshwara married Kannika Parameshwari, his friend's sister. The two had met while Parameshwara was studying in Gandhi Krishi Vignana Kendra, later married in 1982. They had a daughter Shana who lives in the United Kingdom. He is an Ambedkarite, a follower of BR Ambedkar. Parameshwara believes in Buddhism and its philosophy. Parameshwara is an art collector and artefacts picked up by him on his visits to many places.

== Appointments and fellowships ==
Parameshwara has held various appointments and fellowships. These include:

- Deputy Chief Minister of Karnataka
- Home Minister of Karnataka
- President, Karnataka Athletics Association
- Member, Board of Regent, University of Agriculture Science, Bangalore
- Chairman, Sri Siddhartha University (SAHE), Tumkur
- Honorary Joint Secretary, Sri Siddhartha Education Society.
- Chairman, Karnataka Science & Technology Board, Tumkur
- Member, Karnataka Library Authority
- Member, Committee on Open University
- Member, Price Fixation Committee on Agriculture
- Member, Australian Society of Plant Physiology
- Member, Indian Society of Plant Physiology
- Member, Indian Society of Agricultural Science
- Fellow of the Indian Institute of Agricultural Technologists
- Fellow of the Indian Society of Technical Education

== Awards ==
- Karnataka Game Changer Award 2017(U. K. Karnataka Business Chamber)
- National Unity Award in 1993
- Distinguished Leadership Award
