= Nafees Fazal =

Indian politician (born 1947)

Member of the Karnataka Legislative Council
- In office 1994–2006
- Constituency: Elected by MLAs

Minister of State for Science & Technology
- In office 18 August 2001 – 28 May 2004
- Governor: V. S. Ramadevi; T. N. Chaturvedi
- Chief Minister: S. M. Krishna
- Preceded by: G. Parameshwara

Minister of State for Medical Education
- In office 11 October 1999 – 18 August 2001
- Governor: Khurshed Alam Khan; V. S. Ramadevi
- Chief Minister: S. M. Krishna
- Succeeded by: G. Parameshwara

Personal details
- Born: 4 November 1947 (age 78)
- Citizenship: India
- Party: Indian National Congress
- Spouse: Mohammed Hassan Fazal (m.1964)
- Children: Nooraine Fazal (daughter)
- Profession: Social Worker and Fashion Designer

Nafees Fazal (4 November 1947) is an Indian politician who was the first Muslim woman to hold a ministerial post in South India. She was, at first, the minister of medical education and later became the minister of science & technology during the Krishna ministry in Karnataka. She was elected as a member of the Karnataka Legislative Council for two terms, from 1994 to 2006.

== Early life ==
Nafees Fazal was born on 4 November 1947. She is the granddaughter of Khan Bahadur Mohammed Moosa Sait, a former sheriff of Chennai. She went to a boarding school in Lovedale and Yercaud.

== Political career ==
In 1983, she unsuccessfully contested the Bruhat Bengaluru Mahanagara Palike municipal elections from the Shivajinagar ward on a Congress ticket. Her political mentor was Margaret Alva. She was the president of the Bangalore wing of the Mahila Congress.

In 1994, she was elected to the Karnataka Legislative Council and was an MLC until 2006. During the Krishna ministry, she served as the Minister of Medical Education and the Minister of Science & Technology.

== Personal life ==
In 1964, she married Hassan Fazal, whose family owned the Fazal's clothing store on Commercial Street, Bengaluru. They had 2 daughters. Her daughter, Nooraine Fazal is the CEO and Co-founder of Inventure Academy and a core committee member of the Bangalore Political Action Committee.
