= Siravara =

Sirivara
- village
- Location in Karnataka, India Sirivara (India)
- Coordinates: 13.2190200°N 76.9942400°E
- Country: India
- State: Karnataka
- District: Tumkur
- Talukas: Tumkur

Languages
  - Official: Kannada
- Time zone: UTC+5:30 (IST)
- PIN: 572 120
- Nearest city: Bangalore

Sirivara is a village in the southern state of Karnataka, India. It is located in the Tumkur taluk of Tumkur district in Karnataka.

The village is famous for the temple of Sri Anjaneya Swamy, which was reconstructed during 2009-2010.

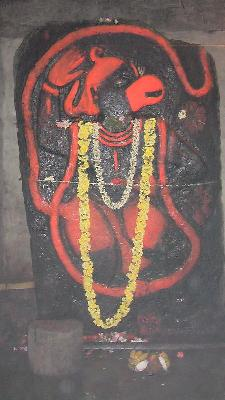
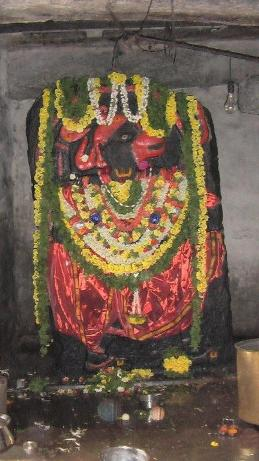
Pictures showing the deity Sri Sirivara Anjaneya Swamy situated at Sirivara

And "Sree lakshmivenkateshwara swamy" Punyaksthra Thimmegowdanapalya

== See also ==
- Tumkur
