= M. R. Manjunath =

Indian politician

Member of Legislative Assembly of Karnataka
- Constituency: Hanur

Personal details
- Party: Janata Dal (Secular) (JDS)

M. R. Manjunath is an Indian Janata Dal (Secular) (JDS) politician from Karnataka, and a member of the Karnataka Legislative Assembly for Hanur Assembly constituency of Hanur, Karnataka.

== Career ==
Mr. Manjunath emerged victorious in the Hanur assembly constituency by defeating his opponent, Narendra, with a margin of 17,654 votes.

== Positions held ==
- 2023: Elected to Karnataka Legislative Assembly
