= Jagdish Chaturvedi =

Indian ENT surgeon and comedian

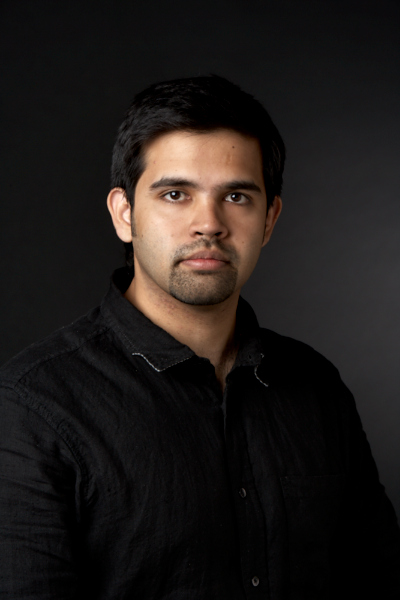
- Jagdish Chaturvedi
- Born: 27 March 1984 (age 42); Bengaluru, Karnataka, India
- Education: St. John's Medical College (DNB ENT); Sri Siddhartha Medical College, Tumakuru (MBBS)
- Occupation: Stand-up Comedy
- Website: jagdishchaturvedi.com

Jagdish Chaturvedi (born 27 March 1984) is an Indian ENT surgeon, actor, and stand-up comedian made popular by his YouTube channel.

== Education and research ==
Chaturvedi received his undergraduate training in medical sciences from Sri Siddhartha Medical College, Tumakuru. He completed his postgraduate training in Ear, nose and throat surgery from St. John's Medical College, Bengaluru.

== Inventions ==
Chaturvedi has contributed to the teams that invented the following:

ENTraview, that has been licensed and commercialised by ICARUS Design.

Sinucare, which has been commercialised by InnAccel Technologies Pvt Ltd.

== Recognition ==
Chaturvedi was one of the 35 innovators under the age of 35 as chosen by the MIT Technology Review in 2016.
