= Kora Amanikere, Tumakuru =

Village in Karnataka, India

Coordinates: 13.4240°N 77.0660°E

Kora Amanikere is a tiny rural village in the Tumakuru (Tumkur) tehsil, Tumakuru district, Karnataka state, India. It is located about 80 km northwest of Bangalore, 12 km northwest of Tumakuru, and about 1.5 km south of the village of Kora in the same district. Its PIN is 572128.

According to the 2011 census, Kora Amanikere (census code 611341) had 24 households and 101 inhabitants (including 13 children aged 0–6), and a 84% literacy rate.

== See also ==
- Kora, Tumkur
