= SSAHE =

SSAHE may refer to:

- Sri Siddhartha Academy of Higher Education, private college in India
- Swiss Society of Anatomy, Histology and Embryology, see Life Sciences Switzerland
