= Hanur Assembly constituency =

Legislative Assembly constituency in Karnataka State, India

Coordinates: 12.09°N 77.3°E

Hanur
- Constituency No. 221 for the Karnataka Legislative Assembly

Constituency details
- Country: India
- Region: South India
- State: Karnataka
- Division: Mysore
- District: Chamarajanagar
- Lok Sabha constituency: Chamarajanagar
- Established: 1967
- Total electors: 221,630 (2023)
- Reservation: None

Member of Legislative Assembly
- 16th Karnataka Legislative Assembly
- Incumbent M. R. Manjunath
- Party: JD(S)
- Alliance: NDA
- Elected year: 2023
- Preceded by: R. Narendra

Hanur Assembly constituency is one of the 224 Legislative Assembly constituencies of Karnataka in India.

It is part of Chamarajanagar district.

== Members of the Legislative Assembly ==
Election	Member	Party
1967	H. Nagappa	Indian National Congress
1972	R. Rache Gowda	Indian National Congress
1978	G. Raju Gouda	Indian National Congress
1983	K. P. Shantamurthy	Indian National Congress
1985	G. Raju Gouda	Independent politician
1989	G. Raju Gouda	Indian National Congress
1994	H. Nagappa	Janata Dal
1999	G. Raju Gouda	Indian National Congress
2004	Parimala Nagappa	Janata Dal
2008	R. Narendra	Indian National Congress
2013	R. Narendra	Indian National Congress
2018	R. Narendra	Indian National Congress
2023	M. R. Manjunath	Janata Dal

== Election results ==
=== Assembly Election 2023 ===
2023 Karnataka Legislative Assembly election : Hanur
Party	Candidate	Votes	%	±%
JD(S)	M. R. Manjunath	75,632	41.93%	▲15.54
INC	R. Narendra	57,978	32.14%	▼3.35
BJP	Dr. Preethan. K. N	35,870	19.89%	▼13.53
AAP	Harish. K	2,515	1.39%	New
RPI	T. John Peter	1,596	0.88%	New
BSP	Madesha. M	1,302	0.72%	New
NOTA	None of the above	602	0.33%	▼0.48
Margin of victory		17,654	9.79%	▲7.73
Turnout		180,401	81.40%	▼0.70
Total valid votes		180,366		
Registered electors		221,630		▲6.73
JD(S) gain from INC		Swing	▲6.44	

=== Assembly Election 2018 ===
2018 Karnataka Legislative Assembly election : Hanur
Party	Candidate	Votes	%	±%
INC	R. Narendra	60,444	35.49%	▼2.45
BJP	Dr. Preethan Nagappa	56,931	33.42%	▲32.52
JD(S)	M. R. Manjunath	44,957	26.39%	▼3.68
NOTA	None of the above	1,373	0.81%	New
Margin of victory		3,513	2.06%	▼5.81
Turnout		170,490	82.10%	▲5.98
Total valid votes		170,333		
Registered electors		207,662		▲14.64
INC hold		Swing	▼2.45	

=== Assembly Election 2013 ===
2013 Karnataka Legislative Assembly election : Hanur
Party	Candidate	Votes	%	±%
INC	R. Narendra	55,684	37.94%	▼9.36
JD(S)	Parimala Nagappa	44,135	30.07%	▲20.97
Independent	S. Dattesh Kumar	13,258	9.03%	New
KJP	Ponnachi Mahadevaswamy	11,629	7.92%	New
BSP	S. Puttaraju	2,981	2.03%	▼26.88
AIADMK	M. Ravi	2,370	1.61%	New
Independent	Siddappa. R	2,369	1.61%	New
BJP	B. K. Shivakumar	1,323	0.90%	▼2.37
Independent	K. Nagaraju	1,076	0.73%	New
Margin of victory		11,549	7.87%	▼10.52
Turnout		137,887	76.12%	▲6.25
Total valid votes		146,760		
Registered electors		181,142		▲0.36
INC hold		Swing	▼9.36	

=== Assembly Election 2008 ===
2008 Karnataka Legislative Assembly election : Hanur
Party	Candidate	Votes	%	±%
INC	R. Narendra	59,523	47.30%	▲5.77
BSP	Parimala Nagappa	36,383	28.91%	New
JD(S)	P. Vishnukumar	11,446	9.10%	▼43.55
Independent	Ponnachi Mahadevaswamy	7,087	5.63%	New
BJP	D. Somanna	4,110	3.27%	New
Independent	S. Selvaraj	2,352	1.87%	New
RPI(A)	K. Nagaraju	1,071	0.85%	New
Independent	Reshmabanu	848	0.67%	New
Independent	M. Rajendra	770	0.61%	New
Margin of victory		23,140	18.39%	▲7.27
Turnout		126,099	69.87%	▼2.27
Total valid votes		125,841		
Registered electors		180,484		▲11.00
INC gain from JD(S)		Swing	▼5.35	

=== Assembly Election 2004 ===
2004 Karnataka Legislative Assembly election : Hanur
Party	Candidate	Votes	%	±%
JD(S)	Parimala Nagappa	61,626	52.65%	New
INC	R. Narendra	48,613	41.53%	▼14.73
JP	Somanaika (Kellambally)	4,319	3.69%	New
Kannada Nadu Party	Mallu. B	2,491	2.13%	New
Margin of victory		13,013	11.12%	▼3.52
Turnout		117,295	72.14%	▼3.96
Total valid votes		117,049		
Registered electors		162,593		▲9.00
JD(S) gain from INC		Swing	▼3.61	

=== Assembly Election 1999 ===
1999 Karnataka Legislative Assembly election : Hanur
Party	Candidate	Votes	%	±%
INC	G. Raju Gouda	62,314	56.26%	▲16.19
JD(U)	H. Nagappa	46,102	41.62%	New
BSP	H. Mohankumar	1,376	1.24%	New
Margin of victory		16,212	14.64%	▼3.65
Turnout		113,512	76.10%	▼0.25
Total valid votes		110,765		
Rejected ballots		2,730	2.41%	▲0.92
Registered electors		149,167		▼0.64
INC gain from JD		Swing	▼2.10	

=== Assembly Election 1994 ===
1994 Karnataka Legislative Assembly election : Hanur
Party	Candidate	Votes	%	±%
JD	H. Nagappa	65,851	58.36%	▲12.38
INC	G. Raju Gouda	45,209	40.07%	▼11.59
Margin of victory		20,642	18.29%	▲12.61
Turnout		114,613	76.35%	▼1.59
Total valid votes		112,834		
Rejected ballots		1,707	1.49%	▼2.36
Registered electors		150,122		▲16.20
JD gain from INC		Swing	▲6.70	

=== Assembly Election 1989 ===
1989 Karnataka Legislative Assembly election : Hanur
Party	Candidate	Votes	%	±%
INC	G. Raju Gouda	50,008	51.66%	▲42.55
JD	H. Nagappa	44,510	45.98%	New
JP	S. Shantamurthy	1,219	1.26%	New
Margin of victory		5,498	5.68%	▲0.94
Turnout		100,691	77.94%	▼1.86
Total valid votes		96,810		
Rejected ballots		3,881	3.85%	▲2.13
Registered electors		129,189		▲27.76
INC gain from Independent		Swing	▲5.04	

=== Assembly Election 1985 ===
1985 Karnataka Legislative Assembly election : Hanur
Party	Candidate	Votes	%	±%
Independent	G. Raju Gouda	36,975	46.62%	New
JP	H. Nagappa	33,213	41.88%	▲31.64
INC	K. Chikkamari Gowda	7,229	9.11%	▼36.80
Independent	C. Mahadeva Swamy	1,301	1.64%	New
Margin of victory		3,762	4.74%	▲2.68
Turnout		80,695	79.80%	▲6.53
Total valid votes		79,310		
Rejected ballots		1,385	1.72%	▼0.54
Registered electors		101,116		▲6.02
Independent gain from INC		Swing	▲0.71	

=== Assembly Election 1983 ===
1983 Karnataka Legislative Assembly election : Hanur
Party	Candidate	Votes	%	±%
INC	K. P. Shantamurthy	31,357	45.91%	▲43.82
Independent	G. Raju Gouda	29,951	43.85%	New
JP	R. Rache Gowda	6,995	10.24%	▼32.20
Margin of victory		1,406	2.06%	▼9.59
Turnout		69,882	73.27%	▼10.53
Total valid votes		68,303		
Rejected ballots		1,579	2.26%	▼0.32
Registered electors		95,378		▲12.22
INC gain from INC(I)		Swing	▼8.18	

=== Assembly Election 1978 ===
1978 Karnataka Legislative Assembly election : Hanur
Party	Candidate	Votes	%	±%
INC(I)	G. Raju Gouda	37,530	54.09%	New
JP	H. Nagappa	29,447	42.44%	New
INC	Venkategowda. S	1,453	2.09%	▼52.05
Independent	Krishna Swamy. H	652	0.94%	New
Margin of victory		8,083	11.65%	▲3.37
Turnout		71,220	83.80%	▲8.96
Total valid votes		69,386		
Rejected ballots		1,834	2.58%	▲2.58
Registered electors		84,991		▲29.20
INC(I) gain from INC		Swing	▼0.05	

=== Assembly Election 1972 ===
1972 Mysore State Legislative Assembly election : Hanur
Party	Candidate	Votes	%	±%
INC	R. Rache Gowda	25,887	54.14%	▲2.07
INC(O)	H. N. A. Appa	21,930	45.86%	New
Margin of victory		3,957	8.28%	▲4.13
Turnout		49,231	74.84%	▼10.51
Total valid votes		47,817		
Registered electors		65,785		▲23.56
INC hold		Swing	▲2.07	

=== Assembly Election 1967 ===
1967 Mysore State Legislative Assembly election : Hanur
Party	Candidate	Votes	%	±%
INC	H. Nagappa	22,939	52.07%	New
Independent	G. Venkategowda	21,113	47.93%	New
Margin of victory		1,826	4.15%	
Turnout		45,443	85.35%	
Total valid votes		44,052		
Registered electors		53,240		
INC win (new seat)				

== See also ==
- List of constituencies of the Karnataka Legislative Assembly
- Chamarajanagar district
