= P. R. Sudhakara Lal =

Indian businessman and political leader (born 1968)

Member of Legislative Assembly
- In office 12 May 2013 – 15 May 2018
- Chief Minister: Siddaramaiah
- Preceded by: Dr. G. Parameshwara
- Succeeded by: Dr. G. Parameshwara
- Constituency: Koratagere

Personal details
- Born: 18 August 1968 (age 58) Tumkuru
- Party: Indian National Congress (until 2004); Janata Dal (Secular) (since 2004; 22 years ago).
- Spouse: Shree Roopa I.A.S
- Children: Sucharith Sudhakar Lal & Sumedha Sudhakar Lal
- Parent: P. T. Roopala Naik & Lakshmi Bai
- Relatives: K. Shivamurthy (Brother in law)
- Education: Siddaganga Institute of Technology(B. E.); (L.L.B.)
- Profession: LPG Distributor & Politician

P. R. Sudhakara Lal is an Indian businessman and political leader, Member of the Legislative Assembly of Koratagere, Tumkur district Karnataka, India. He was elected in the year 2013, defeating G. Parameshwara.

== Early life and education ==
Sudhakar Lal P. R. born (in c. 1965) in Koratagere to P. T. Roopala Naik, he studied Mechanical Engineering at Siddaganga Institute of Technology, Tumkur and has L.L.B. (Law) Degree.

== Political career ==
- In 1989, Sudhakar Lal P. R., joined Congress as District President (NSUI) of Tumkur.
- In 2000, he was elected as ZP Member from Holavana Halli Constitution in Koratagere.
- In 2004, he left Congress for JD(s) along with K. N. Rajanna.
- In 2004, he was elected as ZP Member from Thovinakere in Koratagere as a JD(S) Member.
- In 2009, he was elected as ZP Member from Huli Kunte Constitution in Koratagere.
