= Kora, Tumakuru =

Village in Karnataka, India

Coordinates: 13.4378°N 77.0635°E

Kora is a village in the Tumakuru (Tumkur) tehsil, Tumakuru district, Karnataka state, India. It is located about 84 km northwest of Bangalore, 11 km north of Tumakuru, and 1.5 km north of Kora Amanikere, a smaller hamlet in the same district.

According to the 2011 census, the Kora village (census code 611338) had 557 households and 2379 inhabitants (including 211 children aged 0–6), and 78% literacy level.
