= G. Raju Gouda =

Indian politician

Minister of State for Food Processing, Government of Karnataka
- In office 1999–2003

Member of Karnataka Legislative Assembly from Hanur
- In office 1999–2004
- Preceded by: H. Nagappa
- Succeeded by: Parimala Nagappa
- In office 1985–1994
- Preceded by: K. P. Shantamurthy
- Succeeded by: H. Nagappa
- In office 1978–1983
- Preceded by: R. Rache Gowda
- Succeeded by: K. P. Shantamurthy

Personal details
- Died: 26 March 2006 (aged 72)
- Party: Indian National Congress
- Spouse: Savitramma
- Children: 2

G. Raju Gouda (died 26 March 2004) was an Indian politician from the State of Karnataka. He was a four-term member of the legislative assembly from Hanur, and served as Minister of State for Food Processing between 1999 and 2003 as part of the Krishna ministry. He quit the ministry on health grounds in December 2003, four months before his death, in March 2004.
