= Sri Siddhartha Institute of Technology =

Engineering college in Karnataka, India

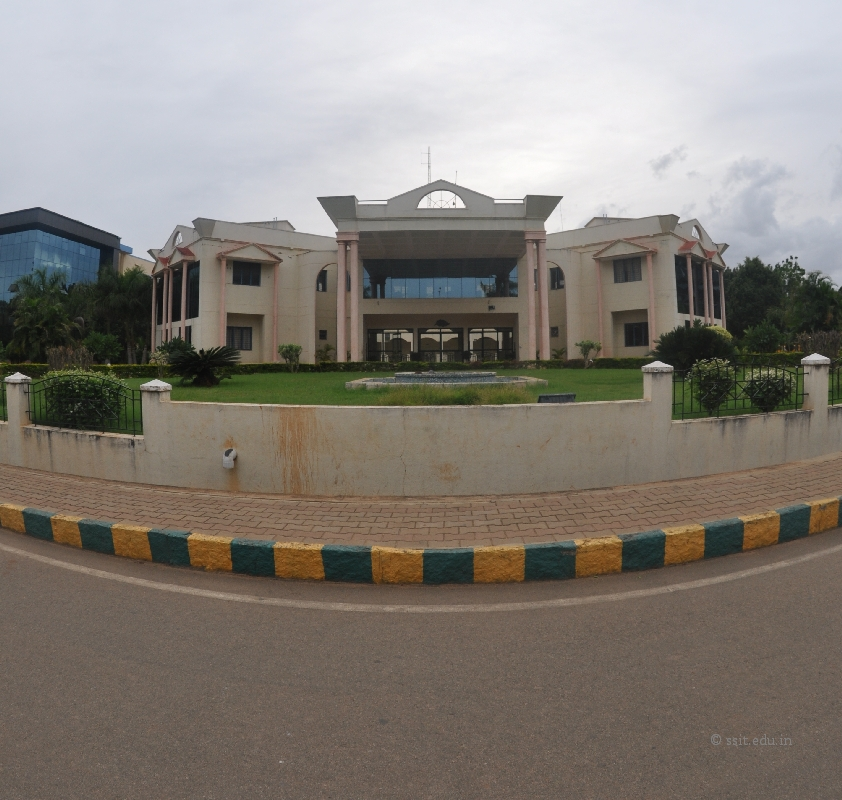
- Type: Private
- Established: 1979; 47 years ago
- Parent institution: Sri Siddhartha Education Society
- Affiliations: Sri Siddhartha Academy of Higher Education
- Principal: Dr. M. M. Nadakatti
- Undergraduates: 9 Departments / 650 Intake
- Postgraduates: 8 Branches / 173 Intake
- Location: Maralur 572105, Tumkuru., Tumkuru, Karnataka, India; 13°32′10.58″N 77°09′04.85″E
- Accreditation: AICTE, NBA
- Website: www.ssit.edu.in

Logo of SSIT college, Tumkuru

Sri Siddhartha Institute of Technology (SSIT) is a university located in Tumkur, Karnataka, India. Sri Siddhartha Institute of Technology was established by the Siddhartha Education Society.

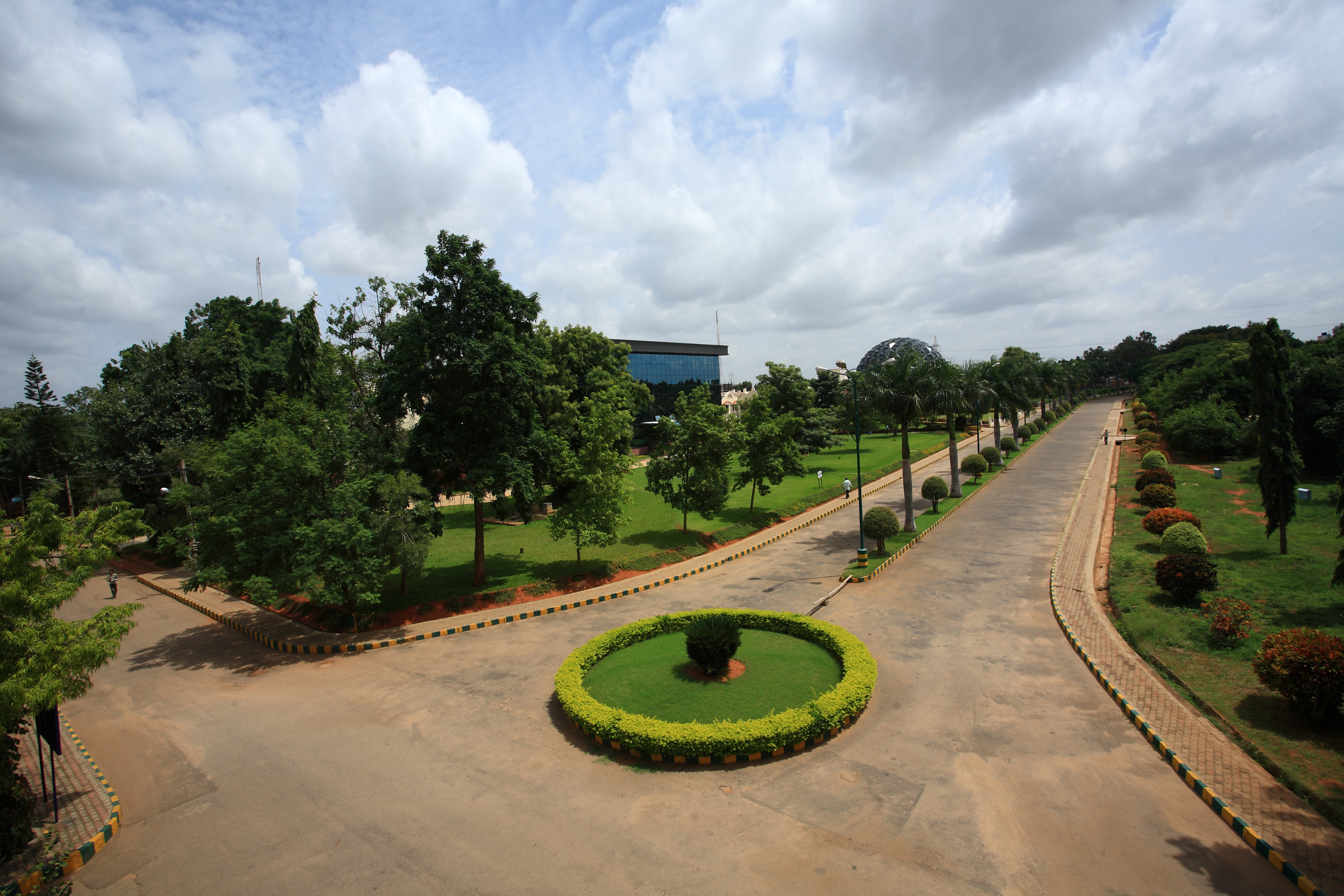
Aerial View of the Campus

== History ==
SSIT is managed by the Sri Siddhartha Education Society, which was founded in 1979.

The late Sri H.M. Gangadharaiah, a staunch Gandhian and Buddhist, established the Sri Siddhartha Education Society in 1979 with the blessings of the father of Bhoodhan movement, "Saint Vinobha Bhave," with the objective of providing education to the student community from rural areas and backward classes. Since then it is led by Dr. G. Shivaprasad, an ophthalmologist and Dr. G. Parameshwara, a doctorate in agriculture from Australia.

SSES has 84 educational establishments under its aegis spread across the southern part of Karnataka, including

- Engineering College - Sri Siddhartha Institute of Technology
- Medical College - Sri Siddhartha Medical College
- Dental College - Sri Siddhartha Dental College
- College of Education
- First grade College, TCH^College
- College of Nursing
- Junior colleges
- Training institutions
- Sanskrit schools
- Pali schools
- High schools in several districts in Karnataka State

Its silver jubilee was celebrated in the year 1984 with the President of India, Sri Giani Zail Singh, as the chief guest.

List of Principals
| Dr. M.S. Raviprakasha | 2018-current |
| Dr. Veeraiah | 2014-2018 |
| K. A. Krishnamurthy | 2005-2014 |
| Y. M. Reddy | 1984-2004 |

== Administration ==
SSIT is maintained by Sri Siddhartha Education Society, Sri.G Parameshwar, President, KPCC is the joint secretary of the institution.

== Affiliations and approvals ==
The institute is an institutional of the ISTE and is recognised by the All India Council for Technical Education.

== Undergraduate programs ==
- Civil Engineering
- Computer Science And Engineering
- Electronics and Communication Engineering
- Electrical And Electronics Engineering
- Industrial Engineering and Management
- Information Science Engineering
- Instrumentation Technology
- Mechanical Engineering
- Telecommunication Engineering
- Medical Electronics

== Postgraduate programs ==
- Master of Computer Applications

Master of Technology

- Thermal Power Engineering
- Digital Electronics
- Computer Science And Engineering
- CADD Structure
- VLSI & Embedded Systems
- Computer Aided Industrial Drives
- Product Design And Manufacturing

== Campus ==
Spread over 65 acres in Kunigal Road, Tumkur. 5 km from Tumkur city bus stand & 4 km from the railway station.

A unique geodesic dome library has more than 200,000 books.

- Central Library
- Post Graduate Block
- Scholar Block
- SSIT STEP - Science & Technology Entrepreneurs Park
- Administrative Block
- Gangadaraih Memorial Park
- Lumbini Boys Hostel
- Rajagruha Boys Hostel

== College Festivals ==
- Kalothsava - College Fest
- YANTRIK-MECHANICAL FEST
- ELECTROTEC-ECE.TCE & ML
- Interface - CS, IS & MCA Fest
- Nirmaan - Civil
- Vidyuth - EEE
- Tantra
- Saamarthya
- Unicorn - IEM
- Technodea - State level project exhibition and competition
