= Kote Anjaneya =

Temple of Hanuman located in Tumkur, Karnataka, India

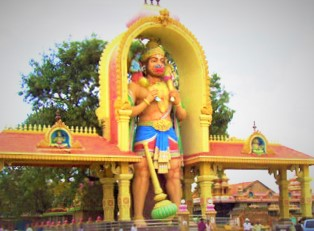
- Kote Anjaneya Temple Hanuman statue.

- Location in Karnataka

Religion
- Affiliation: Hinduism
- District: Tumkur district
- Deity: Hanuman

Location
- Location: Tumkur
- State: Karnataka
- Country: India
- Coordinates: 13.34804°N 77.10216°E

Architecture
- Type: Dravidian

Website
- koteanjaneya.com

Kote Anjaneya is a temple of Hanuman located in Tumkur, Karnataka. The temple has a 75 feet tall Hanuman statue at the entrance which was inaugurated in May 2005.

It is one of the Sri Vyasaraja consecrated idols of Hanuman. Sri Vyasaraja was Rajaguru of historical Vijayanagar Empire. He was also the guru of the likes of Kanakadasa and Purandaradasa. Over five hundred years ago Sri Vyasaraja consecrated 732 idols of Hanuman throughout India.
