= Bajagur =

- village
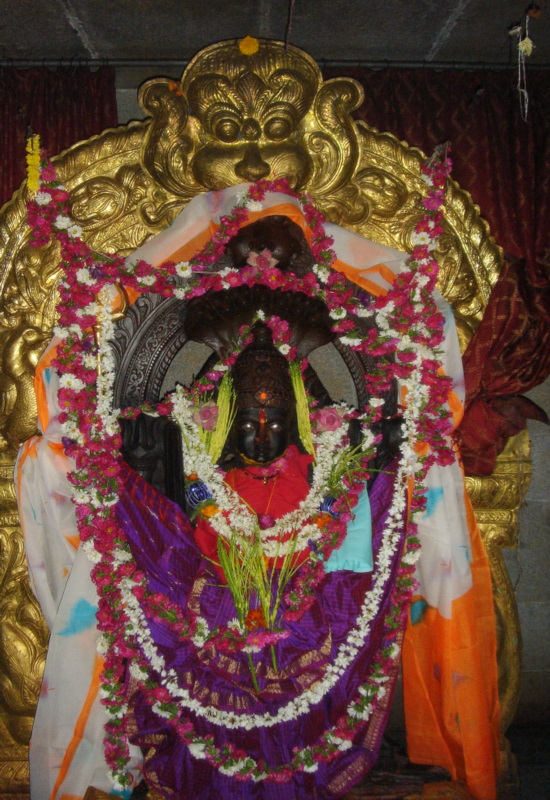
- Kempamma Devi, the village's Goddess
- Country: India
- State: Karnataka
- District: Tumkur

Languages
  - Official: Kannada
- Time zone: UTC+5:30 (IST)
- PIN: 572 224
- Telephone code: 08134
- Vehicle registration: ka 44

Bajagur is a village in Tiptur Taluk in Tumkur district of Karnataka, India. It is situated on the southern side of the state of Karnataka.

== Location and administration ==
The villages is located 78 km towards west from District headquarters Tumakuru, 14 km from Tiptur town in Tumkur district and is 140 km from the state capital Bangalore. It is bordered by Tiptur, Arasikere, Hassan, Tumkur. Bajagur covers the total areas of 469.42 hectares most of which is agricultural area with only 97.99 hectares of non-agricultural area.

Local language of Bajagur is Kannada. Total population of the villages is 1865 with approximately 503 houses. Literacy rate in the village is 68.5% as per the census details from the authorities.

== Agriculture ==
Coconuts, Paddy and Ragi are agricultural commodities grown in this village. Total irrigated area in this village is 153.78 hectares from Boreholes/Tube wells 153.78 hectares is the Source of irrigation.

== Temples ==
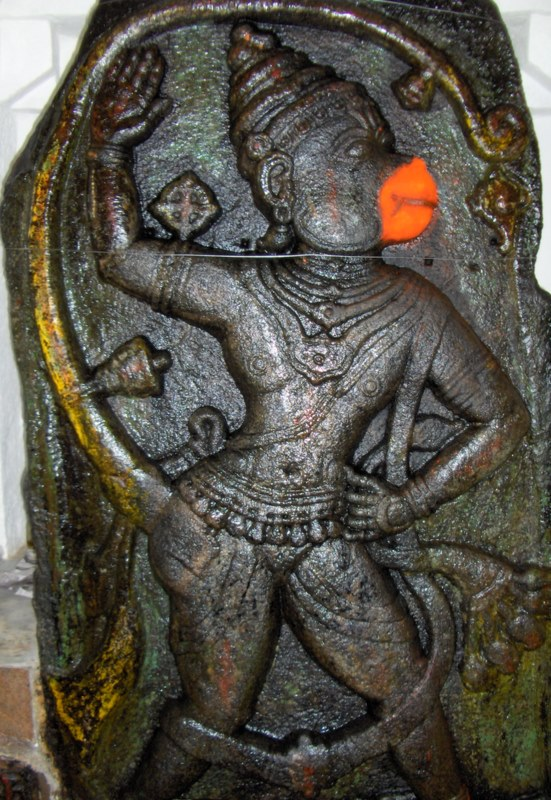
Anjaneya Swamy

The noted temple is the 'Kempamma Devi temple . There is also a Aanjaneya Temple. An annual cart (ತೇರು) festival is held during the month of April.

The nearest railway station is located in Tiptur and is about 140 km from Bangalore.

== See also ==
- Tiptur
- Tumkur
- Tumkur District
- Taluks of Karnataka
