= Koratagere Assembly constituency =

Legislative Assembly constituency in Karnataka, India

Coordinates: 13.52°N 77.23°E

Koratagere
- Constituency No. 134 for the Karnataka Legislative Assembly

Constituency details
- Country: India
- Region: South India
- State: Karnataka
- District: Tumkur
- Lok Sabha constituency: Tumkur
- Established: 1961
- Total electors: 204,692 (2023)
- Reservation: SC

Member of Legislative Assembly
- 16th Karnataka Legislative Assembly
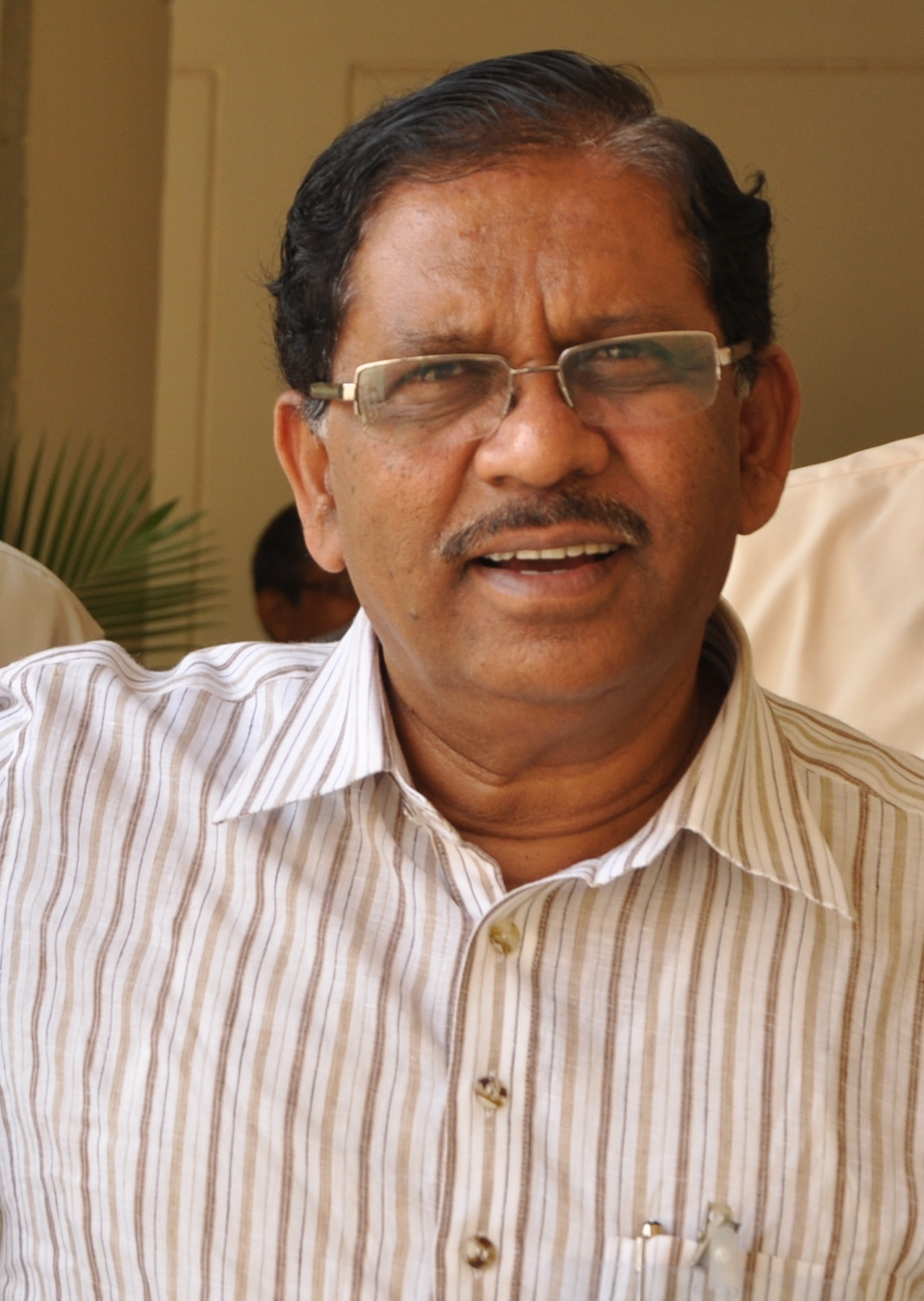
- Incumbent G. Parameshwara
- Party: Indian National Congress
- Elected year: 2023
- Preceded by: P. R. Sudhakara Lal

Koratagere Assembly constituency is one of the 224 constituencies in the Karnataka Legislative Assembly of Karnataka, a southern state of India. It is also part of Tumkur Lok Sabha constituency.

== Members of the Legislative Assembly ==
Election	Member	Party
1962	R. Channigaramaiah	Indian National Congress
1967	T. S. Sivanna	Indian National Congress
1972	Mudduramaiah	Indian National Congress
1978	Mudduramaiah	Indian National Congress
1983	C. Veeranna	Janata Party
1985	C. Veeranna	Janata Party
1989	C. Veerabhadraiah	Indian National Congress
1994	C. Channigappa	Janata Dal
1999	C. Channigappa	Janata Dal
2004	C. Channigappa	Janata Dal
2008	Dr. G. Parameshwara	Indian National Congress
2013	P. R. Sudhakara Lal	Janata Dal
2018	Dr. G. Parameshwara	Indian National Congress
2023	Dr. G. Parameshwara	Indian National Congress

== Election results ==
=== Assembly Election 2023 ===
2023 Karnataka Legislative Assembly election : Koratagere
Party	Candidate	Votes	%	±%
INC	Dr. G. Parameshwara	79,099	45.31%	▼2.33
JD(S)	P. R. Sudhakara Lal	64,752	37.09%	▼6.10
BJP	B. H. Anil Kumar	24,091	13.80%	▲6.68
AAP	D. Hanumantharayappa	1,233	0.71%	New
Independent	Muniyappa. K. M	1,159	0.66%	New
NOTA	None of the above	760	0.44%	▼0.35
Margin of victory		14,347	8.22%	▲3.77
Turnout		174,759	85.38%	▲0.65
Total valid votes		174,578		
Registered electors		204,692		▲1.18
INC hold		Swing	▼2.33	

=== Assembly Election 2018 ===
2018 Karnataka Legislative Assembly election : Koratagere
Party	Candidate	Votes	%	±%
INC	Dr. G. Parameshwara	81,598	47.64%	▲8.92
JD(S)	P. R. Sudhakara Lal	73,979	43.19%	▼8.53
BJP	Y. H. Huchhaiah	12,190	7.12%	▲4.91
NOTA	None of the above	1,351	0.79%	New
Margin of victory		7,619	4.45%	▼8.55
Turnout		171,416	84.73%	▲0.95
Total valid votes		171,297		
Registered electors		202,298		▲11.19
INC gain from JD(S)		Swing	▼4.08	

=== Assembly Election 2013 ===
2013 Karnataka Legislative Assembly election : Koratagere
Party	Candidate	Votes	%	±%
JD(S)	P. R. Sudhakara Lal	72,229	51.72%	▲22.13
INC	Dr. G. Parameshwara	54,074	38.72%	▲0.07
KJP	Chandraiah Vaale Chandraiah	15,738	11.27%	New
BJP	Peddaraju	3,088	2.21%	▼22.69
Independent	M. L. Santhosh	1,388	0.99%	New
BSRCP	Anjaneya	1,265	0.91%	New
Independent	Narasimha Murthy	1,100	0.79%	New
BSP	Bulla Subbarao	989	0.71%	▼1.09
Margin of victory		18,155	13.00%	▲3.93
Turnout		152,421	83.78%	▲6.50
Total valid votes		139,659		
Registered electors		181,932		▲10.25
JD(S) gain from INC		Swing	▲13.07	

=== Assembly Election 2008 ===
2008 Karnataka Legislative Assembly election : Koratagere
Party	Candidate	Votes	%	±%
INC	Dr. G. Parameshwara	49,276	38.65%	▲16.75
JD(S)	Chandraiah	37,719	29.59%	▼5.99
BJP	Gangahanumaiah	31,745	24.90%	New
BSP	Dr. Murlidhara. D	2,297	1.80%	▼1.32
Independent	H. N. Shivagangaiah	2,163	1.70%	New
Independent	Narasimha Murthy	1,669	1.31%	New
SP	Ashok Rajavardhan	1,096	0.86%	New
Independent	N. Manjunatha	780	0.61%	New
Margin of victory		11,557	9.07%	▲6.52
Turnout		127,534	77.28%	▲7.32
Total valid votes		127,477		
Registered electors		165,019		▼1.82
INC gain from JD(S)		Swing	▲3.07	

=== Assembly Election 2004 ===
2004 Karnataka Legislative Assembly election : Koratagere
Party	Candidate	Votes	%	±%
JD(S)	C. Channigappa	41,826	35.58%	▲3.87
JD(U)	C. Veeranna	38,832	33.04%	▲28.70
INC	Rangaswamy. M	25,745	21.90%	▼9.14
BSP	Umesh. R. S	3,670	3.12%	New
JP	N. Sukumar	2,980	2.54%	New
Urs Samyuktha Paksha	Raju. T. K	1,425	1.21%	New
Independent	Prakash. R	1,295	1.10%	New
Kannada Nadu Party	Renuka Paramesh	1,103	0.94%	New
Margin of victory		2,994	2.55%	▲1.88
Turnout		117,582	69.96%	▼4.27
Total valid votes		117,545		
Registered electors		168,071		▲11.57
JD(S) hold		Swing	▲3.87	

=== Assembly Election 1999 ===
1999 Karnataka Legislative Assembly election : Koratagere
Party	Candidate	Votes	%	±%
JD(S)	C. Channigappa	33,558	31.71%	New
INC	C. Veerabhadraiah	32,852	31.04%	▲4.76
BJP	Andanappa	17,075	16.13%	▲1.72
Independent	C. Veeranna	14,230	13.45%	New
JD(U)	Jayanthi	4,590	4.34%	New
Independent	Prakash. R	3,282	3.10%	New
Margin of victory		706	0.67%	▼6.61
Turnout		111,819	74.23%	▼1.41
Total valid votes		105,832		
Rejected ballots		5,882	5.26%	▲3.49
Registered electors		150,645		▲5.29
JD(S) gain from JD		Swing	▼1.85	

=== Assembly Election 1994 ===
1994 Karnataka Legislative Assembly election : Koratagere
Party	Candidate	Votes	%	±%
JD	C. Channigappa	35,672	33.56%	▼0.42
INC	G. Venkatachalaiah	27,937	26.28%	▼11.56
Independent	C. Veeranna	20,259	19.06%	New
BJP	B. N. Shivanna	15,315	14.41%	▲10.83
Independent	Veerakyathaiah. G. C	1,927	1.81%	New
INC	Jayaram. P. H. (Kumar)	1,185	1.11%	New
SP	N. M. Mylappa	1,003	0.94%	New
Independent	Cholaraju	888	0.84%	New
Independent	K. M. Natakumar	705	0.66%	New
Margin of victory		7,735	7.28%	▲3.42
Turnout		108,221	75.64%	▲1.48
Total valid votes		106,302		
Rejected ballots		1,919	1.77%	▼3.08
Registered electors		143,082		▲7.08
JD gain from INC		Swing	▼4.28	

=== Assembly Election 1989 ===
1989 Karnataka Legislative Assembly election : Koratagere
Party	Candidate	Votes	%	±%
INC	C. Veerabhadraiah	35,684	37.84%	▼2.14
JD	C. Veeranna	32,044	33.98%	New
JP	S. L. Cholappa	20,234	21.46%	New
BJP	T. C. Satheeshkumar	3,379	3.58%	▲2.09
Margin of victory		3,640	3.86%	▼14.68
Turnout		99,096	74.16%	▼4.01
Total valid votes		94,291		
Rejected ballots		4,805	4.85%	▲3.36
Registered electors		133,617		▲27.05
INC gain from JP		Swing	▼20.68	

=== Assembly Election 1985 ===
1985 Karnataka Legislative Assembly election : Koratagere
Party	Candidate	Votes	%	±%
JP	C. Veeranna	47,395	58.52%	▲2.07
INC	N. Sukumar	32,379	39.98%	▲3.30
BJP	H. N. Shivakumar	1,209	1.49%	▼2.81
Margin of victory		15,016	18.54%	▼1.22
Turnout		82,211	78.17%	▲7.97
Total valid votes		80,983		
Rejected ballots		1,228	1.49%	▼0.77
Registered electors		105,168		▲9.68
JP hold		Swing	▲2.07	

=== Assembly Election 1983 ===
1983 Karnataka Legislative Assembly election : Koratagere
Party	Candidate	Votes	%	±%
JP	C. Veeranna	37,139	56.45%	▲17.47
INC	Mudduramaiah	24,136	36.68%	▲33.53
BJP	Siddalingappa. S. R	2,832	4.30%	New
Independent	Shiarndraiah	1,686	2.56%	New
Margin of victory		13,003	19.76%	▲11.92
Turnout		67,314	70.20%	▼3.52
Total valid votes		65,793		
Rejected ballots		1,521	2.26%	
Registered electors		95,890		▲8.43
JP gain from INC(I)		Swing	▲9.63	

=== Assembly Election 1978 ===
1978 Karnataka Legislative Assembly election : Koratagere
Party	Candidate	Votes	%	±%
INC(I)	Mudduramaiah	29,833	46.82%	New
JP	C. Veeranna	24,835	38.98%	New
Independent	Rammanna. M	5,285	8.29%	New
INC	Moregowda. H	2,005	3.15%	▼48.15
Independent	Nanjegowda. N	1,195	1.88%	New
Independent	Devaraj. D. A	561	0.88%	New
Margin of victory		4,998	7.84%	▼24.98
Turnout		65,190	73.72%	▲18.07
Total valid votes		63,714		
Rejected ballots		1,476	2.26%	▲2.26
Registered electors		88,432		▲16.64
INC(I) gain from INC		Swing	▼4.48	

=== Assembly Election 1972 ===
1972 Mysore State Legislative Assembly election : Koratagere
Party	Candidate	Votes	%	±%
INC	Mudduramaiah	20,998	51.30%	▲0.35
Independent	T. H. Hanumantharayappa	7,564	18.48%	New
SSP	T. R. Channappa	6,309	15.41%	New
ABJS	C. Veeranna	5,483	13.40%	New
Independent	L. Raju	577	1.41%	New
Margin of victory		13,434	32.82%	▲7.24
Turnout		42,193	55.65%	▲3.84
Total valid votes		40,931		
Registered electors		75,813		▲13.22
INC hold		Swing	▲0.35	

=== Assembly Election 1967 ===
1967 Mysore State Legislative Assembly election : Koratagere
Party	Candidate	Votes	%	±%
INC	T. S. Sivanna	15,938	50.95%	▲4.26
Independent	V. A. Reddy	7,938	25.38%	New
PSP	T. R. Channappa	7,404	23.67%	▼22.15
Margin of victory		8,000	25.58%	▲24.71
Turnout		34,696	51.81%	▲12.46
Total valid votes		31,280		
Registered electors		66,962		▲26.75
INC hold		Swing	▲4.26	

=== Assembly Election 1962 ===
1962 Mysore State Legislative Assembly election : Koratagere
Party	Candidate	Votes	%	±%
INC	R. Channigaramaiah	9,053	46.69%	New
PSP	S. Anjaiah	8,885	45.82%	New
Independent	M. C. Mariyappa	853	4.40%	New
Independent	S. Hanumanthaiah	598	3.08%	New
Margin of victory		168	0.87%	
Turnout		20,788	39.35%	
Total valid votes		19,389		
Registered electors		52,828		
INC win (new seat)				

== See also ==
- List of constituencies of Karnataka Legislative Assembly
- Tumkur district
