= H. Nagappa =

Indian politician

Hanur Nagappa

Member of Karnataka Legislative Assembly
- In office 1994–1999
- Chief Minister: J. H. Patel
- Preceded by: G. Raju Gowda
- Succeeded by: G. Raju Gowda
- Constituency: Hanur

Personal details
- Died: 8 December 2002
- Party: Janata Dal-United
- Spouse: Parimala Nagappa

H. Nagappa was an Indian Janata Dal (United) political leader, two term member of the Karnataka Legislative Assembly and minister for agricultural marketing in the J. H. Patel cabinet.

He was abducted by forest brigand Veerappan and his gang members on 25 August 2002 from the Kamagere village of Chamarajanagar district. On 8 December 2002, Nagappa was killed by Veerappan or his gang. The identity of his killer is a mystery.
