= C. P. Sadashivaiah =

Indian freedom fighter

- Born: Chikkanayakanahalli Prabhanna Sadashivaiah; January 9, 1931; Tumakuru, Karnataka, India
- Died: June 2, 2007 (aged 76)
- Other name: Babuji
- Occupations: Industrialist, Inventor, Freedom Fighter
- Organization: Shiva Industries
- Spouse: C. P. Rathna Sadashivaiah
- Children: 3 Daughters
- Awards: WIPO Gold Medal, NRDC National Award, Deshasnehi Award, Krishi Pandit

C. P. Sadashivaiah (9 January 1931 – 2 June 2007) was an Indian freedom fighter, industrialist, and inventor from Tumakuru, Karnataka. He was known for designing and improving agricultural machinery and for receiving recognition from the World Intellectual Property Organization (WIPO) and the National Research Development Corporation (NRDC) for innovation.

== Early life and independence movement ==
Born in Tumakuru district, Karnataka, Sadashivaiah was influenced by the Indian independence movement, which shaped his ideas of equality, unity, and national service. His early participation in the movement laid the foundation for his lifelong commitment to social progress and innovation.

== Industrial and inventive career ==
After independence, Sadashivaiah founded Shiva Industries, which focused on developing agricultural equipment to modernize and simplify farm work. He created and improved several implements, including the tractor-mounted deep trencher, which earned him the WIPO Gold Medal and the NRDC National Award. His inventions were noted for their affordability and practicality for Indian farmers.

== Beliefs ==
Sadashivaiah believed in the oneness of God, religion, and humanity. Influenced by the ideals of the freedom movement, he viewed all religions as expressions of the same truth. These convictions led him to embrace the Baháʼí Faith, which teaches the unity of humankind and the harmony of science and religion. His faith inspired his work in education, equality, and social service.

== Personal life and philanthropy ==
He was married to C. P. Rathna Sadashivaiah, and the couple had three daughters. Together, they were known for their philanthropic activities, particularly in supporting education, women’s empowerment, and rural development.

== Awards and recognition ==
- WIPO Gold Medal – World Intellectual Property Organization
- NRDC National Award – National Research Development Corporation
- Deshasnehi Award – recognition for national service
- Krishi Pandit – for contributions to agriculture

== Legacy ==
C. P. Sadashivaiah is remembered in Karnataka for his contributions to agricultural innovation, rural upliftment, and his emphasis on moral and scientific progress.

== Sources ==
- "WIPO Medal for Karnataka Inventor". The Hindu. 6 September 2006. Archived from the original on 17 December 2006.
- "World Intellectual Property Organization Awards for Inventors". WIPO. Archived from the original on 28 March 2014.
- "Freedom Fighter and Inventor Honoured". The Hindu. 23 February 2007. Archived from the original on 28 March 2014.

== See also ==
- Baháʼí Faith in India
