= Sri Siddhartha Academy of Higher Education =

College in Karnataka, India

Coordinates: 13°20′43″N 77°03′23″E

- Other name: Sri Siddhartha Academic of Higher Education
- Type: Deemed to be
- Established: 30 May 2008
- Affiliations: UGC
- Chancellor: G. Parameshwara
- Vice-Chancellor: Dr. Lingegowda K. B.
- Location: Tumakuru, Karnataka, India
- Campus: Urban
- Website: www.sahe.in www.sahetumkur.ac.in

Sri Siddhartha Academy of Higher Education (SSAHE) is a collegiate private 'deemed to be university' in Karnataka, India. It was established on 30 May 2008, as per Section 3 of UGC Act 1956 to improve the quality of technical education in southern Karnataka.

The university is named after Sri Siddhartha (Gautama Buddha). It is in Agalakote, Tumkur.

SSAHE has three colleges affiliated to it with an intake capacity of over 800 undergraduate students and 200 postgraduate students. The university encompasses technical fields which offers 11 undergraduate and 10 postgraduate courses. There are more than 100 PhD candidates.

SSAHE has a TEQIP center and is affiliated to Sri Siddhartha Institute of Technology offering post graduate courses. It has many departments recognized as research centers which are spread across its affiliated institutions in Tumkur, Karnataka. One of its affiliated college, Sri Siddhartha Institute of Technology, is recognised by the World Bank for getting assistance in setting up state-of-the-art laboratories, campus facilities, and research centers under the TEQIP (Technical Education Quality Improvement Programme (Phase I & II), a Government of India initiative).

The SSIT Campus, Tumkur campus of SSAHE, offers BE, M.Tech., MCA and PhD programs.

The university has signed MoUs with multinational corporations to improve the industry interactions for students and the teachers.

SSAHE is a member of the Association of Indian Universities.

== Constituent colleges ==
Sri Siddhartha Medical College, the affiliated medical college, has an intake of 250 for MBBS and 12 for MD in microbiology, general medicine, Obstetrics and gynaecology, paediatrics, radiology, general surgery, ENT, ophthalmology; eight for diploma in OBG, child health, ENT, ophthalmology, radiology.

Sri Siddhartha Institute of Medical Sciences and Research Center. Medical college in T.Begur with annual intake of 150 MBBS seats and an associated nursing college with annual intake of 100 seats.

Sri Siddhartha Institute of Technology has an intake of 650 students in undergraduate engineering disciplines, 144 in postgraduate Master of Technology and 60 Master of Computer Applications.

- Electronics and communication engineering
- Industrial engineering and management
- Information science and engineering
- Mechanical engineering
- Medical electronics and engineering
- Tele-communication and engineering

Sri Siddhartha Dental College has 40 BDS undergraduate and 12 MDS postgraduate programmes in orthodontics, periodontics, oral and maxillofacial surgery, pedodontics, prosthodontia, oral pathology.

== Post graduate programmes ==
- Master of Computer Applications
- Master of Technology in Computer Aided Design of Structures; Computer Aided Design of Structures; Computer Aided Industrial Drives; Computer Science and Engineering; Digital Electronics; Product Design and Manufacturing; Thermal Power Engineering; VLSI & Embedded Systems
