= Parimala Nagappa =

Indian politician

Member of Karnataka Legislative Assembly
- In office 2004–2008
- Constituency: Hanur

Personal details
- Party: B.J.P
- Spouse: H. Nagappa

Parimala Nagappa is a politician from the state of Karnataka and wife of Late H. Nagappa. Parimala was elected as M.L.A from Hanur constituency on a Janata Dal (Secular) ticket in the 2004 Karnataka assembly elections. On 16 March 2017, she joined the Bharatiya Janata Party.
