= Sri Siddhartha Medical College =

Medical school in Karnataka, India

- ಶ್ರೀ ಸಿದ್ಧಾರ್ಥ ವೈದ್ಯಕೀಯ ಕಾಲೇಜು
- Motto: Sabbe Loko Hitatthaya
- Motto in English: Let all be Happy and Prosperous
- Type: Private
- Established: 1988; 38 years ago
- Parent institution: Sri Siddhartha Education Society
- Academic affiliations: Sri Siddhartha Academy of Higher Education
- Principal: Dr. M. B. Sanikop
- Academic staff: 223
- Students: 174
- Undergraduates: 130
- Postgraduates: 44
- Location: Tumakuru, Karnataka, 572107, India
- Campus: Agalakote, Tumakuru
- Language: English
- Website: www.ssmctumkur.org

Sri Siddhartha Medical College (SSMC) is a medical college and hospital in Tumakuru, Karnataka, India. The Medical College and Hospital was established in the year 1988 and serves the population of Tumakuru City and surrounding towns. It is ranked 11th among deemed medical colleges.

The college was inaugurated by the then Prime Minister of India, Rajiv Gandhi.

== College campus ==
The Medical College and hospital is located in the outskirts of Tumakuru city – 6 km from the city amidst green field in a vast campus of 350 acres of the side of Bengaluru – Honnavar National highway and it is just 76 km from Bengaluru, well connected by road and railway. The climate is similar to Bengaluru. There are 21 buildings with built-in area of about 73,875 sq. mt at the cost of about Rs. 20 crores, which include furnished quarters for staffs. Separate buildings for Pre and Para-clinical departments, spacious library and information center and SSMC Hospital.

== Hospital ==
SSMC Hospital has separate building for OPD and causality with independent departments of Medicine, Surgery, OBG, Ophthalmology, Orthopedics, Paediatrics, ENT, Dermatology, and Radiology. It is a 1350 bedded hospital, fully equipped with 12 major operation theaters in addition to minor operation theaters. SSMC is catering the needs of rural population. There are skilled doctors with specially trained nurses to give a healing touch to the patients. The hospital building also has a post office and a bank to serve the needs of staff, students and the public. There is a canteen, hospital mess, fruit stall and a phone booth to cater the needs of the public.

== Ongoing research programs ==
The college is set under the Sri Siddhartha University, Tumakuru. The college has also produced gold medalists in past. Dr. Yahya Siddiqui, MBBS former teacher in Psychiatry and Forensics has researched on positive effects of Aripiprazole and Ziprasidone in the treatment of depression in bipolar I and bipolar II disorder.

Biochemistry

- Ant carcinogenic effects of natural & synthetic disulphide in induced Hepatoma in rats.
- New Biochemical markers in Critical care in coronary heart disease.
- Hypoglycemic effect of disulfides in experimental diabetes mellitus.
- Anti-atherosclerotic effect of disulphide in rats fed atherogenic diet
- Biochemical aspects of malaria.

Micro Biology

- Anaerobic infections in and around Tumkur.
- Neonatal sepsis.
- Bacterial Vaginosis
- Mycotic Keratitis.
- Enter pathogens in Children.

Orthopedics

- Clinical Study – Management of fracture shaft of tibia by closed interlocking intramedullary nailing in adults.

Pediatrics

- PEFR in lower respiratory disorders in Children.
- Rapid diagnosis of neonatal sepsis by Buffy coat examination.
- Risk factor for preterm delivery and their mortality and morbidity.

Obstetrics & Gynecology

- Clinical Study of magnesium sulfate intramuscular v/s intravenous in patients with eclampsia.

ENT

- Study of osskular defects in csom and its managements
- CT correlated study of Anatomic variations of Para nasal sinuses
- CT Study of Sin nasal inflammatory diseases

Medicine

- Profile and Clinic radiological correlation in patients with stroke score and Guy's Hospital Score
- Evidence of silent myocardial ischemia in type-l diabetics evaluation by tread mill test.
- Profile of patients with organ phosphorus compound poisoning : Special reference to Pseudo Cholinesterase and morality.
- Lung function test in asymptomatic smokers.
- Fructosamine assay as a marker of glycemic control in Diabetics.

Radio Diagnosis

- High resolution computed tomography in pulmonary tuberculosis

Ophthalmology

- Isolation of common fungus in corneal ulcer patients as reported at SSMCH.
- Post operative astigmatism following cataract surgery.
- Causes of decreased vision after cataract surgery ( < 6/24 ).

Surgery

- Acute abdomen – correlation between clinical radiological and operative findings.
- Clinical study of Post-Operative wound infections.
- Comparative study of incisional hernia repair between anatomical and mesh

== Admissions ==
Admissions to U.G and P.G courses shall be made on an All India basis to the identical courses in all deemed-to-be universities through a Common Entrance Test conducted by UGC or by an Institution / Agency identified and approved by the UGC. This shall also apply to those institutions which have already been given the deemed-to-be university status. Total number of under-graduate seats (M.B.B.S) at Sri Siddhartha Medical College: 130 Total number of under-graduate seats (B.D.S) at Sri Siddhartha Dental college : 40 The admissions in the college for 2006 were done based on the Under Graduate Entrance Test (UGET) held by Consortium of Medical, Engineering and Dental Colleges of Karnataka (COMED-K).

== Annual events ==
- MedEX

Medical Exhibition cum Health Awareness program started by Panther batch (2007–08) which is to teach about medical related education to public in all kinds of field, Synapsis batch (SAHE 2010–2011) holds highest visitors record of 60000 held on year of 2013

- FootPrintz

a cultural programme started by Panther batch continued until Synapsis batch. this event usually held on evening during MedEX event

- YouthFest
- Euphoria

=== Other events ===
- HelMethon

Helmethon is helmet awareness campaign initiated and led by Dr. Pallavi Sarji Uthkarsh, Dr. M. S. Rajanna & Dr. Ashok Jayaram, This campaign was designed with the inputs from youth, so that more youth would be part of this. Results of Campaign was successful in bringing the stakeholders together with good community participation and Helmet law was enforced in Tumkur district in less than a fortnight following the campaign. Now helmet usage rate among riders has increased to 80%.

== Notable alumni ==
- Jagdish Chaturvedi
- K. Sudhakar
