= T. N. Chaturvedi =

Indian bureaucrat and politician (1928–2020)

Tirlok Chaturvedi
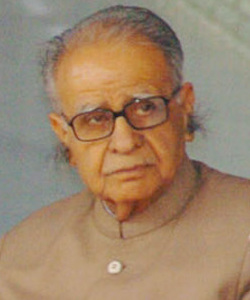

7th Comptroller and Auditor General of India
- In office 1984–1990
- Preceded by: Gyan Prakash
- Succeeded by: C. G. Somiah

9th Governor of Karnataka
- In office 21 August 2002 – 20 August 2007
- Preceded by: V. S. Ramadevi
- Succeeded by: Rameshwar Thakur

Personal details
- Born: Tirlok Nath Chaturvedi; 18 January 1928 Kannauj, United Provinces of Agra and Oudh, British India
- Died: 5 January 2020 (aged 91) Noida, Uttar Pradesh, India
- Education: University of Allahabad
- Awards: Padma Vibhushan (1991)

Triloki Nath Chaturvedi (18 January 1928 – 5 January 2020) was an Indian politician and Indian Administrative Service (IAS) officer of 1950 batch from Rajasthan cadre and served as the 7th Comptroller and Auditor General of India from 1984 to 1990. He was an elected member of the Indian Parliament, and was appointed by the President of India as the Governor of Karnataka and Kerala. He was honored with the Padma Vibushan for public service in 1991. He was associated with numerous academic, research, literary and philanthropic institutions as a member and in various leadership capacities.

== Early life and education ==
Triloki Nath Chaturvedi was born in the village of Tirwa, in the Kannauj area of Uttar Pradesh on January 18, 1928. His father, Pandit Kamta Nath Chaturvedi, was a lawyer and homeopath. He lost his mother, Vidyavati, when he was less than a year old.

After studying at the local village school and college he joined Christ Church College, Kanpur and subsequently Allahabad University, from where he obtained an M.A & LLB degree. He stood First Class throughout in MA, and was presented the University Gold Medal for Economics and Political Science. He sat for the Provincial Civil Service (PCS) examination and stood first in the entire nation. He also sat for the new Indian Administrative Service examination and was selected.

He married Prakashvati Dubey (1933–89) in 1952. They had one daughter and three sons.

== Civil service (1950–84) ==
In 1950, Triloki Nath Chaturvedi was inducted into the first batch of the IAS after the commencement of the Constitution of India. He trained at Metcalfe House in Delhi, and received in-service training in Allahabad and Moradabad.

He was then allotted to the Rajasthan cadre of the IAS service, and served there in various capacities, such as private secretary to the chief minister of Rajasthan, collector and district magistrate of Ajmer, and secretary in the departments of Industries, Mines, Town Planning, and Tourism. He was also chairman of the Jaipur Development Authority. During his stay in Ajmer, he was responsible for clearing the area around the historic dargah of Moinuddin Chisthi. After the slum and encroachments were cleared, a wide road was built as well as a market nearby.

As a fellow of the International Bank for Reconstruction and Development (an arm of the World Bank), he studied in the US in the 1950s. He visited Columbia University, Harvard University, and the University of Chicago. He met scholars and administrators such as Henry Kissinger, George F Kennan, and John Kenneth Galbraith. Chaturvedi was sent on deputation to the Central Government in 1967 by the Government of Rajasthan, after 17 years of service in the state administration. He was appointed Joint Director, National Academy of Administration (later Lal Bahadur Shastri National Academy of Administration), Mussoorie, and served there from 1967 to 1971. The academy is the training centre for newly-inducted members of all Central Administrative Services such as the Indian Administrative Service, Indian Foreign Service, Indian Police Service etc. Some of his illustrious trainees during this period were Gopal Gandhi, Wajahat Habibullah and Aruna Roy.

He was posted as Chief Secretary of Delhi Administration, where he served from 1971 to 1973. He then served as director, India Investment Centre, from 1973 to 1976. He was appointed chief commissioner, Chandigarh in 1976, and was there till 1978, during the period of internal emergency. As chief commissioner, he was the administrative head of Chandigarh. During his tenure, among his achievements was the construction of quarters for the employees of Chandigarh Administration, thus fulfilling a long-standing demand. He also gave Nek Chand, an employee of the Chandigarh Administration, the founder of the Rock Garden, the full-time job of expanding and maintaining the garden. During this period he was made a member of a three-man committee to review the working of the Indian Institute of Advanced Study, Shimla. While the majority report recommended that the institute be shut down as a waste of public money, Chaturvedi put in a minority report, in which he insisted that it was an institute of national importance, and should continue its work. He suggested ways and means by which reforms could improve its effectiveness. The minority report ensured that the Institute was not closed down. At the end of the emergency period, he was transferred back to Rajasthan in 1978 as chairman, Rajasthan Industrial and Minerals Development Corporation (RMIDC). A few months later, the executive council of the Indian Institute of Public Administration (IIPA) in Delhi requested the Central Government for his services as director of the institute. The institute is a centre for academic research in administration. Chaturvedi recruited new staff, and encouraged the implementation of academic programs which served as mid-career refresher courses for administrators. Under his editorship, the Indian Journal of Public Administration became an internationally-recognized journal in its field.

Chaturvedi joined the IIPA as a member in 1959. He was elected a member of the Executive Council of IIPA from 1970 to 2002. He was editor of the prestigious Indian Journal of Public Administration from 1971 to 1997. He was elected chairman of the standing committee from 1990 to 2002. He was elected vice-president, IIPA, from 1994 to 2004. He was elected chairman, IIPA in 2004 and served till his death in 2020. He was appointed Union Education Secretary in the Ministry of Education in 1982 for a brief period. The Education Ministry at the time incorporated the subsequent ministries of sports, women and child welfare, culture, and education. At the instance of the prime minister, Mrs. Indira Gandhi, he was appointed as Union Home Secretary of India in the Ministry of Home Affairs, and remained in this position until 1984. As home secretary, he dealt with numerous issues of national importance, such as the insurgencies in Kashmir and Punjab, and the students’ movement against infiltrators in Assam.

== Comptroller and Auditor General of India ==
He was deemed retired from the IAS upon his appointment as Comptroller and Auditor General of India (CAG, 1984–90). The CAG is a constitutional position, and the holder is appointed by the president.

Chaturvedi began the process of modernization of the office of the CAG. He made the first changes in the administrative structure of the office since independence, which led to expansion of opportunities for officers of the CAG, and making it more efficient. New concepts, such as scientific audit, concurrent audit, and internal audit were introduced. Efforts were made at the international level to connect with the audit institutions of other countries which culminated in India offering training to audit officers of many countries, and being empanelled as a United Nations auditor. An effort was also made to make the audit reports more understandable to the layman. The traditionally low-key profile of the CAG was suddenly raised as these reports were brought into the public realm by media. The institution of the CAG, and Chaturvedi personally, came under attack inside and outside Parliament by the government and the Congress Party in 1989 after the release of an audit report of the purchase of the Swedish Bofors gun by the army, which pointed out lapses in the procurement process.

== Political career ==
Chaturvedi joined the Bharatiya Janata Party (BJP) in 1991, at the request of party leaders Murli Manohar Joshi and Atal Bihari Vajpayee. He unsuccessfully contested the Lok Sabha election from Kannauaj. He was twice elected to the Rajya Sabha from Uttar Pradesh in 1992 and 1998. He was a member of the National Council of the BJP, its highest policy-making body. An active parliamentarian, he was on the panel of vice-chairmen of the Rajya Sabha. He was chairman of the Committee on Industry and of the Delhi Public Library. He was also a member of the Committees on external affairs, defence, public accounts, money laundering, patents, and on the securities scam. He was a member of Indian Council of Social Science Research, Indian Council of Historical Research, National Book Trust, and Asiatic Society (Kolkata). He was also Chancellor of the Rashtriya Sanskrit Vidyapith. He was vice-chairman, Nehru Memorial Museum and Library (NMML) Society (now renamed Prime Mimisters’ Museum and Library) and the chairman of its Executive Council (2001–04), He was elected as India’s representative on the Executive Board of UNESCO in 2001.

He was the first pathak prahari (ombudsman) of the Hindi newspaper Navbharat Times in 1990. Prime Minister Chandrasekhar was the chief guest at the inaugural function.

== Governor ==
Chaturvedi was appointed Governor of Karnataka by President APJ Abdul Kalam in August 2002. In 2004, he was also briefly Governor of Kerala. Chaturvedi was praised for the manner in which he handled the situation when the coalition government in Karnataka of the Congress and the Janata Dal (S) broke down, and the Janata Dal (S) partnered with the BJP. He won the trust and respect of all political parties in the state. The historian Ramchandra Guha described him as one of the best governors that Karnataka had seen.

== Publications ==
He published two books, Transfer of Technology, and Comparative Public Administration (in Hindi and English). He edited or co-edited over 30 books. Academically inclined, he wrote articles and gave lectures on subjects as varied as public administration, ethics in public life, accountability, good governance, the Renaissance in India, Sri Sarda Devi, etc. He was an accomplished writer and speaker in both English and Hindi. His editorials in Sahitya Amrit evoked great interest, with readers sending letters praising them, or asking further questions on the issues discussed.

== Awards ==
He was awarded the Padma Vibhushan for public service in 1991. Among his many other awards were the Magsaysay Plaque for Distinguished Contributions to Public Service and Public Audit by EROPA, Manila (1987), and the first DAV Award for Lifetime Achievement in 2017.

== Personal life ==
Chaturvedi had been interested in spiritual subjects since childhood. While open to all paths, he was particularly interested in Sai Baba, Sathya Sai Baba, Ramana Maharishi, Sri Ramakrishna, Swami Vivekananda, and Sri Aurobindo. A life-long lover of books, and a voracious reader, he amassed an immense collection of 1,20,000 books in Hindi and English. These cover all aspects of world history, and specifically Indian history and religion, spirituality, the Nationalist Movement, Indian Renaissance, public administration, economics, management. He had many rare books, including a first edition of Hind Swaraj by Mahatma Gandhi. After his death, his family donated them to the Prime Ministers’ Museum and Library, where an annual lecture in his memory is also held. The first lecture was delivered by His Holiness the Dalai Lama of Tibet in January, 2023.

He was fond of dogs, having kept eight dogs at his house since 1984. He also walked and fed stray dogs in his neighbourhood.

== Last years ==
Chaturvedi led an active retirement. At the time of his death he was chairman, IIPA; chairman, Hindi Bhawan; chairman, Institute for Studies in Industrial development, chairman, Lala Diwan Chand Trust; vice-chairman, Rajendra Prasad Bhawan Trust. He was also vice-president, DAV Managing Committee, and the Chairman of PGDAV College, Delhi. He was editor of the Hindi monthly Sahitya Amrit from 2007 till his death. He was chairman of the Finance Committee of NMML at the time of his death.

== Death ==
He died suddenly but peacefully on 5 January 2020 in Noida. He was described by the jurist Fali Nariman as one of the finest civil servants that independent India had seen.

Political offices
Preceded by V. S. Ramadevi	Governor of Karnataka; 2002 – 2007	Succeeded by Rameshwar Thakur
Preceded by Sikander Bakht	Governor of Kerala; 25 February 2004 - 23 June 2004	Succeeded by R. L. Bhatia
