= V. S. Ramadevi =

Indian politician (1934–2013)

8th Governor of Karnataka
- In office 2 December 1999 – 20 August 2002
- Preceded by: Khurshed Alam Khan
- Succeeded by: T.N. Chaturvedi

12th Governor of Himachal Pradesh
- In office 26 July 1997 – 1 December 1999
- Preceded by: Mahabir Prasad
- Succeeded by: Vishnu Kant Shastri

Secretary General of the Rajya Sabha
- In office 1 July 1993 – 25 July 1997
- Preceded by: Sudarshan Agarwal
- Succeeded by: S. S. Sohoni

Chief Election Commissioner of India
- In office 26 November 1990 – 12 December 1990
- Preceded by: R. V. S. Peri Sastri
- Succeeded by: T. N. Seshan

Personal details
- Born: 15 January 1934 Chebrolu, Madras Presidency, British India
- Died: 17 April 2013 (aged 79) Bengaluru, Karnataka, India
- Cause of death: Cardiac arrest
- Occupation: Civil servant

V. S. Ramadevi (15 January 1934 – 17 April 2013) was an Indian politician who was the first lady to become the 8th Governor of Karnataka and 9th Chief Election Commissioner of India from 26 November 1990 to 11 December 1990. She was the first woman to become Chief Election Commissioner of India. She was succeeded by T. N. Seshan. Ramadevi was the first (and to date, only) woman to serve as Secretary General of the Rajya Sabha, from 1 July 1993 to 25 September 1997. She was also the first and to date, the only female Governor of Karnataka, from 2 December 1999 to 20 August 2002.

== Career ==
Ramadevi was born in Chebrolu of West Godavari District, Andhra Pradesh, India on 15 January 1934 (which happens to be the date of the Sankranti harvest festival). She was educated in Eluru. She registered her name as advocate after completing M.A. LLB in the Andhra Pradesh High Court. She served as the Governor of Himachal Pradesh from 26 July 1997 to 1 December 1999 and as the Governor of Karnataka from 2 December 1999 to 20 August 2002.

She died on 17 April 2013 in her residence in HSR Layout Bangalore.
