= Hanur =

- Town
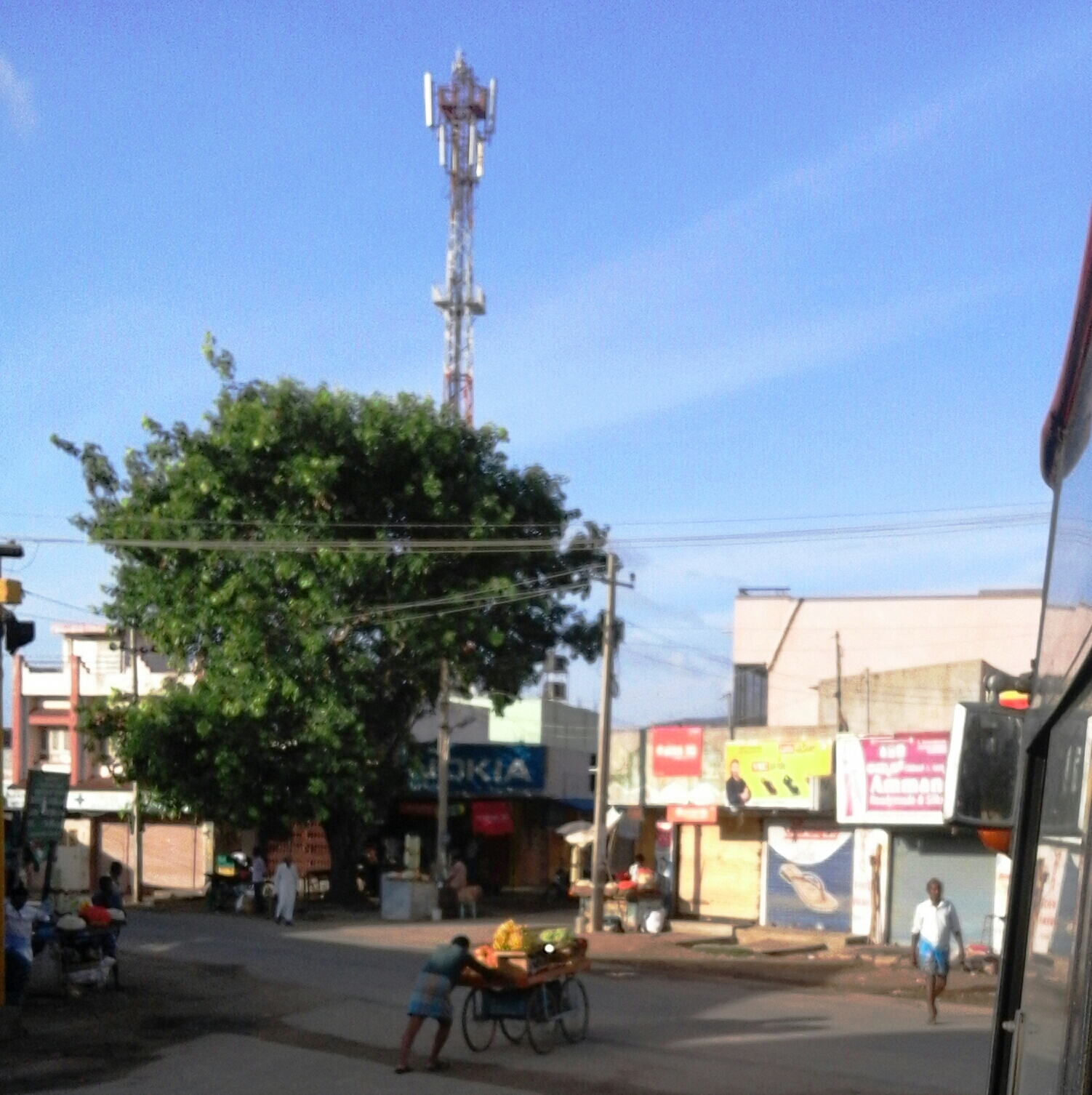
- Hanur Town
- Nickname: Town of Hills
- Interactive map of Hanur
- Coordinates: 12.083°N 77.283°E
- Country: India
- State: Karnataka
- District: Chamarajanagar

Government
  - Body: Town Panchayath

Area
  - Total: 11.02 km^{2} (4.25 sq mi)
- Elevation: 655 m (2,149 ft)

Population (2011)
  - Total: 11,066
  - Density: 1,004/km^{2} (2,601/sq mi)

Languages
  - Official: Kannada
- Time zone: UTC+5:30 (IST)
- PIN: 571 439
- Telephone code: 08224
- Vehicle registration: KA-10
- Website: www.hanurtown.mrc.gov.in

Hanur is a major taluk in Chamrajnagar district of Karnataka State, India.
