= Tumkur =

City in Karnataka, India

- City
- Tumakuru
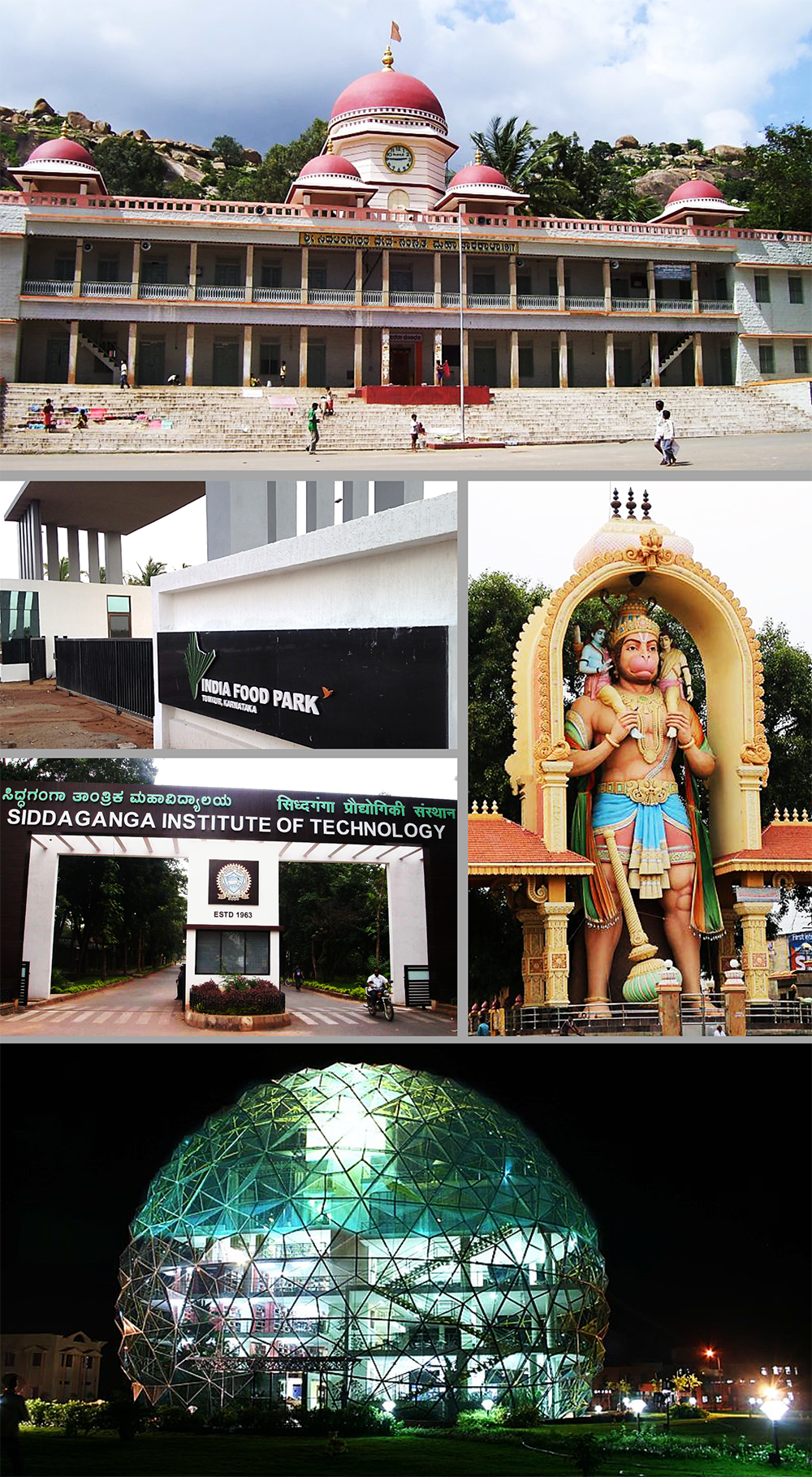
- Clockwise from top: Siddaganga Matha, Kote Anjaneya Swami Statue, Globe Library of SSIT, SIT, India Food Park
- Nickname: Kalpatharu Nadu (land of coconut trees)
- Tumkur in Karnataka
- Coordinates: 13.34°N 77.1°E
- Country: India
- State: Karnataka
- District: Tumkur

Government
  - Type: Mayor–Council
  - Body: Tumakuru City Corporation
  - Mayor: Prabhavathi M
  - Commissioner: Ashwija B V (IAS)

Area
  - City: 102.9 km^{2} (39.7 sq mi)
  - Rank: 2nd largest district
- Elevation: 822 m (2,697 ft)

Population (2011)
  - City: 305,821
  - Rank: India : 150; Karnataka : 10
  - Density: 2,972/km^{2} (7,698/sq mi)
  - Metro: 400,442
- Demonym: Tumkurian
- Time zone: UTC+5:30 (IST)
- Pincode(s): 572101-107
- Telephone code: +91-(0)816
- Vehicle registration: KA-06
- Official language: Kannada
- Website: www.tumkurcity.mrc.gov.in

Tumkur, officially Tumakuru, is a city and the headquarters of Tumkur district in Karnataka state, India. It is known for the Siddaganga Matha Lingayat monastery. Tumkur hosts India's first mega food park, a project of the ministry of food processing. The India Food Park was inaugurated by Prime Minister of India in September 2014. It is also included in the Smart Cities Mission list and is among the 100 smart cities to be developed in India. Since 28 August 2010, Tumkur has been accorded the status of a city corporation.

Tumkur is an emerging industrial hub in India, and has a large upcoming industrial corridor as well as a Japanese township. A new International stadium is expected to be completed in Tumkur by 2028, where international cricket tournaments can be hosted. The Green Line of the Bengaluru Namma Metro extension is planned to connect with Tumkur after 2030.

== Etymology ==
Etymologically, the name of the city is believed to have been mutated possibly from "Tumbe ooru" because of the abundance of thumbe hoovu, a kind of flower, or thamate ooru because of the folk musical percussion instrument thamate, that might have been used most here. It is also called Kalpatharu Nadu (land of coconut trees), due to the abundance of coconut trees in the area.

Another story says that during the rule of cholas Gulur was their capital. Since Tumkur is at high elevation the guards used to be there on any hill with tumaki (a kind of drum) and used to make sound in case of any alerts, hence the name. The Indian central government approved the request to officially rename the Tumkur and 12 other cities in October 2014. The city officially became "Tumakuru" on 1 November 2014.

== Geography ==
Tumkur is located at 13.34°N 77.1°E. Tumkur is a city located in the southern state of Karnataka, India. It is situated at an altitude of around 800 meters above sea level and is located about 70 kilometres northwest of the state capital, Bengaluru.

The surrounding district features elevated terrain intersected by river valleys. The region also contains hilly and forested areas, including the scenic Devarayanadurga hill range, The river Shimsha originates in the Southern part of the Devarayanadurga hill.

Agriculture in Tumakuru district is supported by monsoon rainfall and favourable terrain. Major crops cultivated include coconut, areca nut, rice, ragi, groundnut, and several oilseeds.

=== Climate ===
Climate data for Tumkur (1981–2010, extremes 1972–1999)
Month	Jan	Feb	Mar	Apr	May	Jun	Jul	Aug	Sep	Oct	Nov	Dec	Year
Record high °C (°F)	32.5 (90.5)	35.0 (95.0)	37.4 (99.3)	38.9 (102.0)	38.1 (100.6)	39.0 (102.2)	36.1 (97.0)	36.1 (97.0)	32.5 (90.5)	33.0 (91.4)	31.2 (88.2)	31.0 (87.8)	39.0 (102.2)
Mean daily maximum °C (°F)	28.6 (83.5)	31.3 (88.3)	33.9 (93.0)	35.0 (95.0)	34.5 (94.1)	30.5 (86.9)	28.9 (84.0)	28.4 (83.1)	29.2 (84.6)	28.9 (84.0)	27.8 (82.0)	27.3 (81.1)	30.4 (86.7)
Mean daily minimum °C (°F)	16.2 (61.2)	17.9 (64.2)	20.1 (68.2)	21.5 (70.7)	21.2 (70.2)	20.3 (68.5)	19.6 (67.3)	19.3 (66.7)	19.3 (66.7)	19.1 (66.4)	17.8 (64.0)	16.3 (61.3)	19.1 (66.4)
Record low °C (°F)	10.6 (51.1)	12.1 (53.8)	13.0 (55.4)	6.0 (42.8)	14.5 (58.1)	14.5 (58.1)	13.0 (55.4)	15.6 (60.1)	11.8 (53.2)	10.0 (50.0)	10.6 (51.1)	10.4 (50.7)	6.0 (42.8)
Average rainfall mm (inches)	7.2 (0.28)	2.4 (0.09)	8.4 (0.33)	31.9 (1.26)	60.5 (2.38)	91.9 (3.62)	124.5 (4.90)	119.7 (4.71)	158.2 (6.23)	137.3 (5.41)	52.2 (2.06)	15.2 (0.60)	809.5 (31.87)
Average rainy days	0.3	0.2	0.5	1.9	4.2	6.3	8.1	8.5	7.6	6.8	3.2	1.0	48.8
Average relative humidity (%) (at 17:30 IST)	35	27	24	29	40	61	67	68	62	60	57	47	48
Source: India Meteorological Department

== Demographics ==
As per the 2011 India census, the population of Tumkur was approximately 542,000. The city has a population density of 3,100 people per square kilometre. The majority of the population belongs to the Hindu religion, with a small minority of Muslims and Christians.

=== Languages ===
Languages of Tumkur City (2011 census)
1. Kannada (67.5%)
2. Urdu (24.4%)
3. Telugu (2.30%)
4. Tamil (2.02%)
5. Hindi (1.81%)
6. Others (1.99%)

Kannada is the language of the majority in Tumkur, which is also the state's official language. The city has a significant number of Urdu speakers, and small populations of Telugu, Tamil and Hindi speakers.

=== Religion ===
Religions in Tumkur City (2011)
Religion	Percent
Hinduism	71.83%
Islam	24.76%
Christianity	1.84%
Jainism	0.88%
Other or not stated	0.69%

Hindus form the majority of the population, with a significant Muslim minority.

== Transportation ==
The city's railway station comes under the South Western Railway Zone (India), and has been renovated recently. It is on the Bangalore-Hubli main line, and is located in the centre of the city, close to the bus stand and the town hall.

City buses are available for transportation within the city, and are run by KSRTC. The service is known as Sri Siddaganga Nagara Sarige, named after the holy place, Siddaganga.

There is a BMTC bus service from here to Kempegowda Bus Station and Electronic city wipro gate operated on Vajra Vistara bus.

The nearest airport to Tumkur is Kempegowda International Airport in Bangalore which is around 90 km from the city.

The state government has plans to expand Bengaluru's Namma Metro rail to Tumkur to enhance connectivity between city & the state capital.

== Educational institutes ==
- Sri Siddhartha Medical College

The Siddaganga Matha provides free education and accommodation for more than 9000 children. Karnataka Rathna Shivakumara Swami was the president of this matha.

== Media ==
Tumkur has a private FM radio channel, Siddhartha, situated at SSIT campus, broadcasting in Kannada language. Amogha local channel is Amogha Networks.

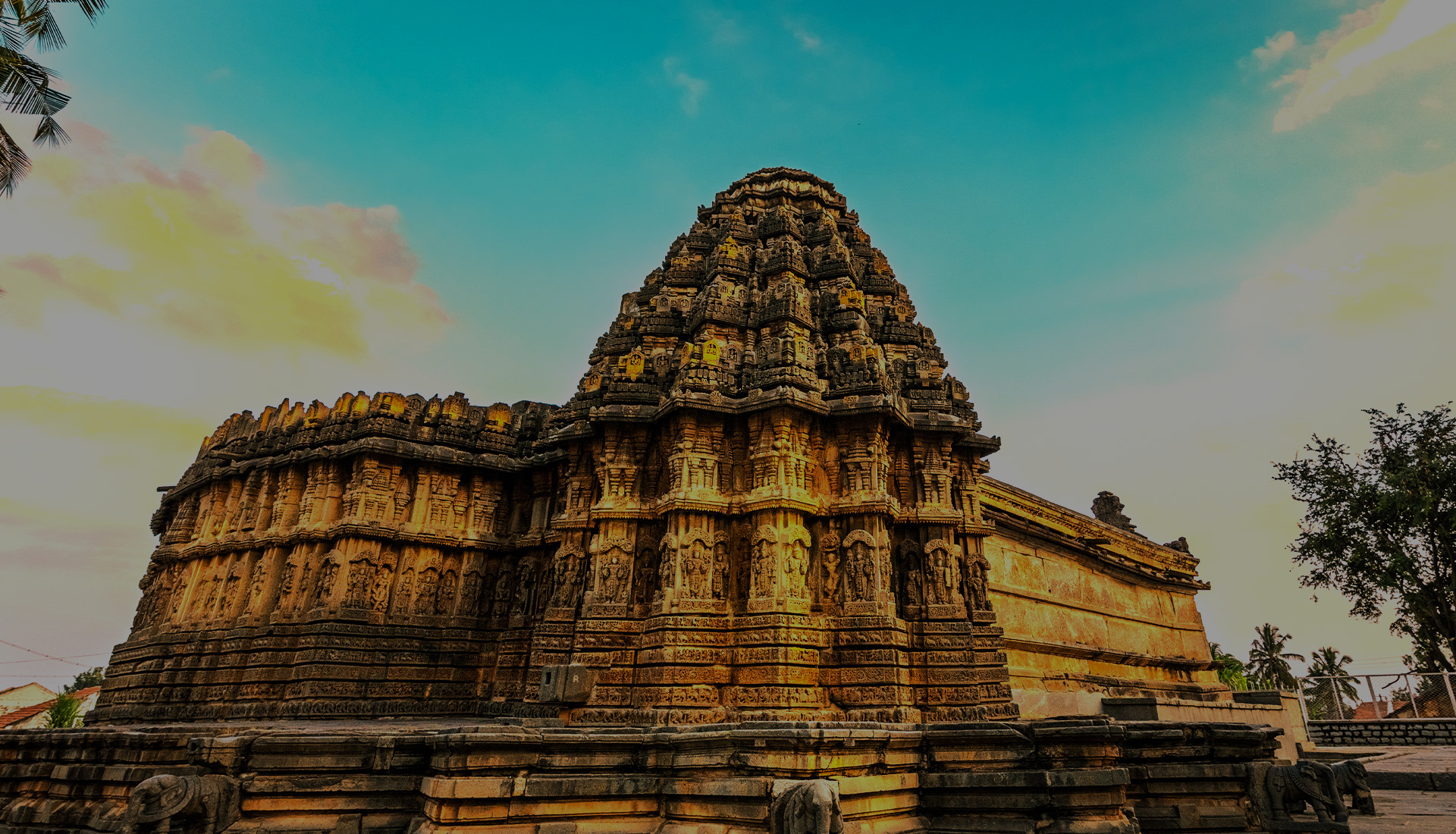
Aralaguppe temple

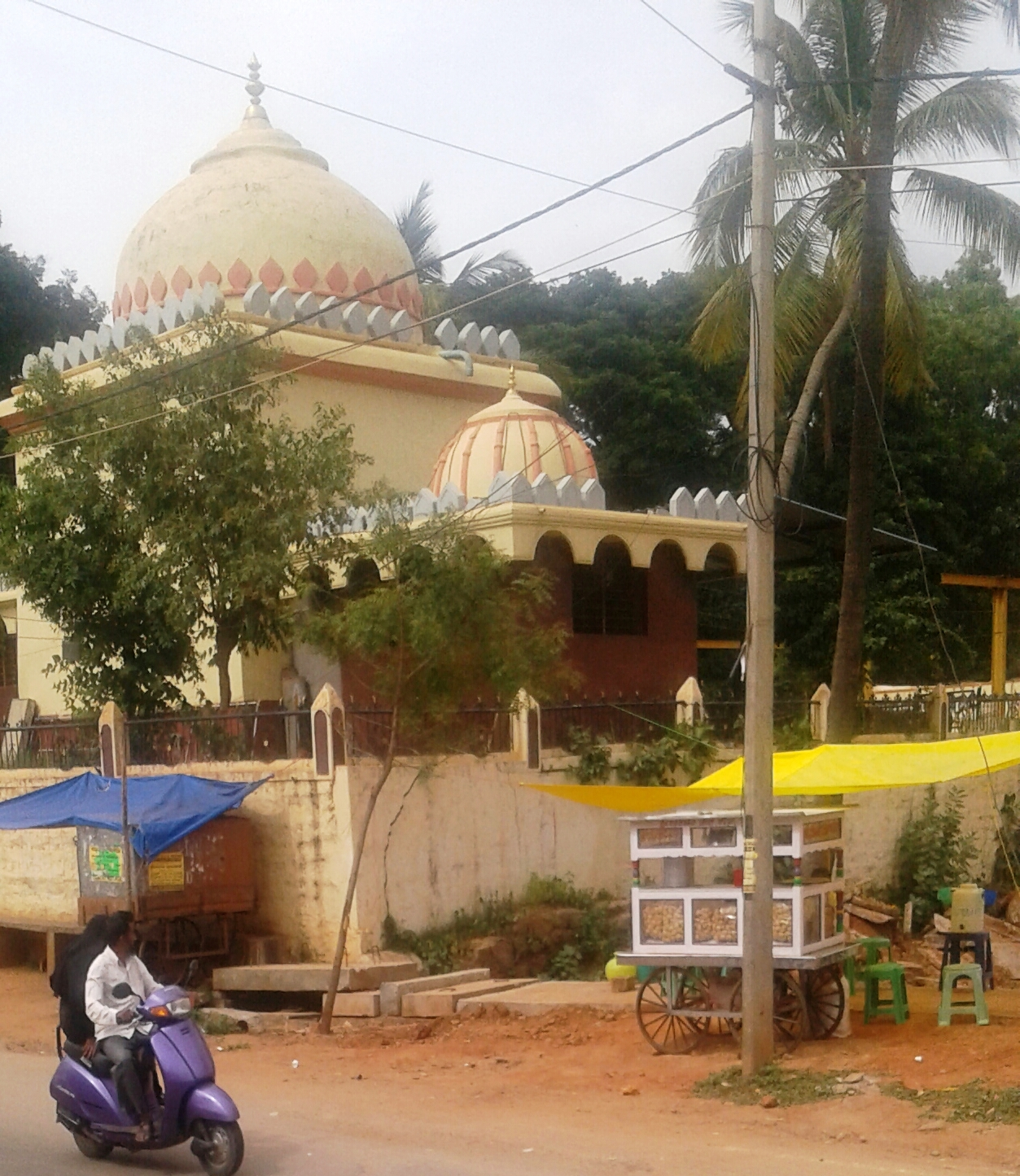
Bhanasankari Temple

City Entrance

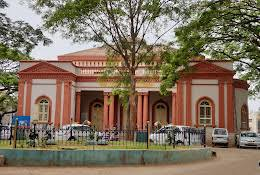
Townhall building tumkur

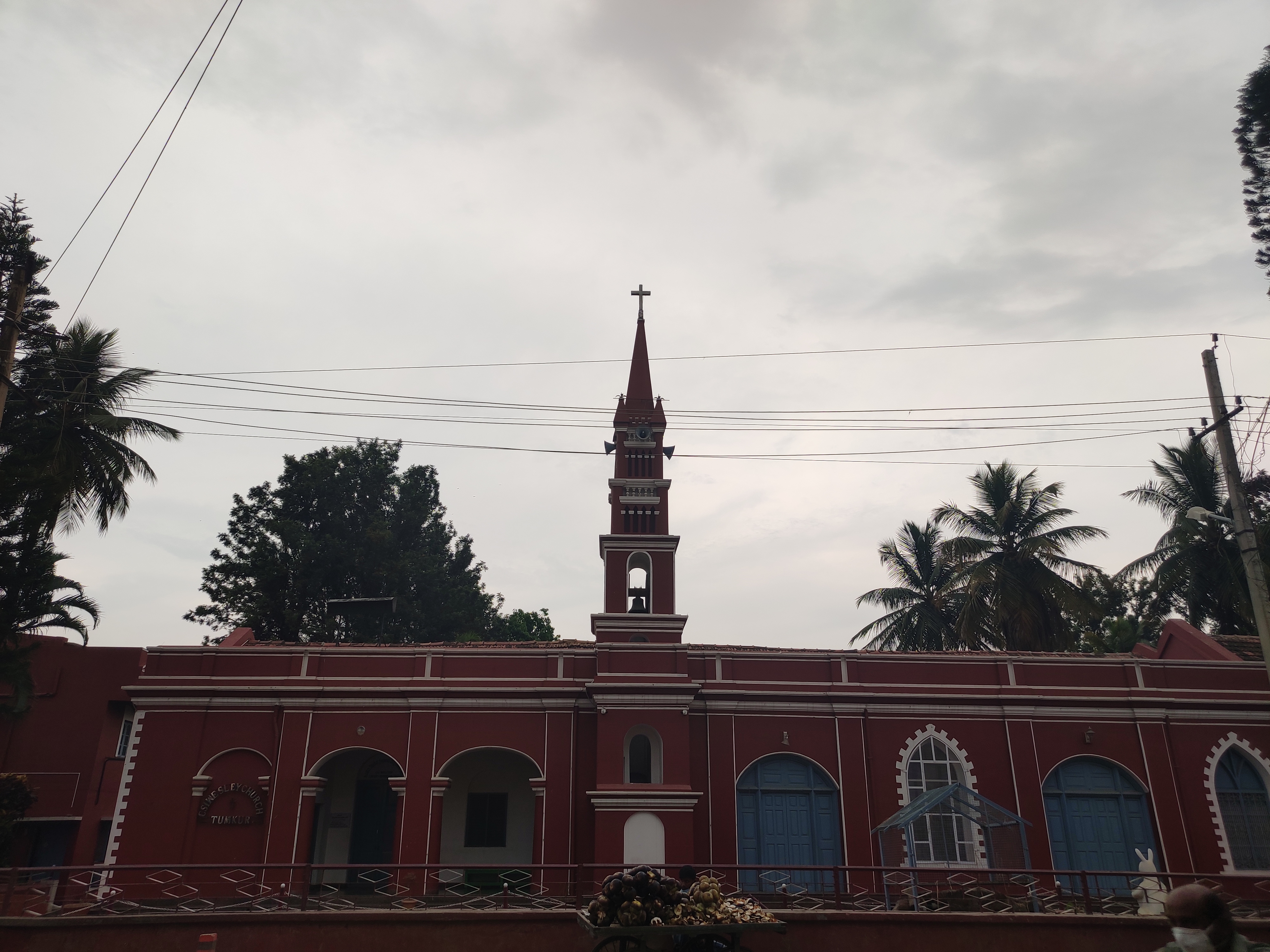
CSI Wesley Church

== Notable people ==
=== Actors ===
- Achyuth Kumar, actor
- Arjun Sarja, actor
- Ashika Ranganath, actress
- Jaggesh, actor
- Komal Kumar, actor and comedian
- Lohithaswa T.S actor, writer
- Manjula, actress
- Narasimharaju, Indian theatre and film actor
- Rangayana Raghu, Actor and Comedian
- Tabla Nani, actor and Comedian
- Sharath Lohithaswa, actor
- Siddhanth, actor
- Sudha Rani, actress
- Suman Ranganath, actress
- Umang Jain, actress
- Umashree, actress

=== Arts ===
- Doddarange Gowda, poet
- Chandrika Gururaj - playback singer
- Amarashilpi Jakanachari, sculptor
- Renuka Kesaramadu, painter and sculptor
- Kunigal Nagabhushan, writer
- T. Sunandamma, writer and humorist
- B. M. Srikantaiah, writer known as Kannadada Kanva
- T. N. Srikantaiah, poet, linguist and teacher
- Chi. Udayashankar, lyricist
- Gubbi Veeranna, theatre director

=== Politicians ===
- Rank Nazeer Ahmed, politician
- G. S. Basavaraj, politician
- K. Lakkappa, politician
- S. Mallikarjunaiah, politician
- G. Parameshwara, former Deputy Chief Minister of Karnataka, former KPCC President

=== Sports ===
- Poll Ashokanand, cricketer
- Poll Shyamsunder, cricketer

=== Others ===
- C. P. Sadashivaiah, Indian freedom fighter
- Shivakumara Swami, supercentenarian, humanitarian, spiritual leader and educator
- Saalumarada Thimmakka, Indian environmentalist
- Raja Ramanna, Indian nuclear physicist

== See also ==
- Tumkur City Assembly constituency
- Ajjappanahalli, Tumkur
- Bajagur
- Narasimha Swamy Temple, Seebi
