= Holavanahalli =

- village
- Location in Karnataka, India Holavanahalli (India)
- Coordinates: 13°32′N 77°18′E
- Country: India
- State: Karnataka
- District: Tumkur
- Talukas: Koratagere

Population (2001)
  - Total: 6,332

Languages
  - Official: Kannada
- Time zone: UTC+5:30 (IST)

Holavanahalli is a village located in the southern state of Karnataka, India. It is located in the Koratagere taluk of Tumkur district in Karnataka.

== Demographics ==
=== Population of Holavanahalli (According to India Census 2001) ===
Particulars	Total	Male	Female
Total Population	7,034	3,524	3,510
Literate Population	5,010	2,676	2,334
Illiterate Population	2,024	848	1,176

== See also ==
- Tumkur
- Districts of Karnataka
