= Brachystelma tumakurense =

Scientific classification
- Kingdom: Plantae
- Clade: Tracheophytes
- Clade: Angiosperms
- Clade: Eudicots
- Clade: Asterids
- Order: Gentianales
- Family: Apocynaceae
- Genus: Brachystelma
- Species: B. tumakurense

Binomial name
- Brachystelma tumakurense Gundappa, Sringesw., Vishwan. & Venu

Species of flowering plant

Brachystelma tumakurense is a species of tuberous flowering plant in the dogbane family Apocynaceae. It is found in Tumakuru district, Karnataka, India, for which it is named.

== Description ==
Brachystelma tumakurense is a perennial herb. It has an unbranched, erect and delicate stem that grows up to a height of 1 m (3 ft). The long and narrow leaves, which are curled such that they appear cylindrical, are about 13 cm (5.1 in) long and are separated by internodular spaces of 6–7 cm (2.4–2.8 in). The stem is weak and sometimes bends under the weight of the leaves and flowers.

The plant bears 3–6 drooping flowers. The flowers' pedicels are thread-like and measure about 5 mm (0.2 in) in length. Flower buds are about 5 mm long when mature. The flowers have five sepals, which measure 2.5–3 mm (0.10–0.12 in) in length, are green on the underside and maroon above. Five hairy-looking petals, each measuring 9–10 mm (0.35–0.39 in) long, are borne. The petals' lobes are light green; the bases are greenish, with maroon spots.

=== Phenology ===
The plant itself grows from May to August, after which it withers. The oblong underground tuber, which is edible, persists for up to a year. Flowers are borne from June to July, and fruits from August to September.

== Taxonomy ==
Brachystelma tumakurense was identified from a moist mixed forest in Tumakuru district, Karnataka, in 2017, when deficient rainfall caused grasses surrounding the plant to grow shorter than usual. The plant is named for Tumakuru district.

Brachystelma tumakurense is closely related to B. bourneae, B. maculatum and B. rangacharii; the plants all have oblong tubers, erect stems, long and narrow leaves, and bear 3–6 flowers. B. tumakurense is differentiated from the other three species by having green petals spotted with maroon—the other plants have differently-coloured flowers.

== Distribution and habitat ==
Brachystelma tumakurense is known only from the locality from where it was first described—Devarayanadurga in Karnataka's Tumakuru district. It is found growing among grasses in moist mixed forests.
