= South Karnataka =

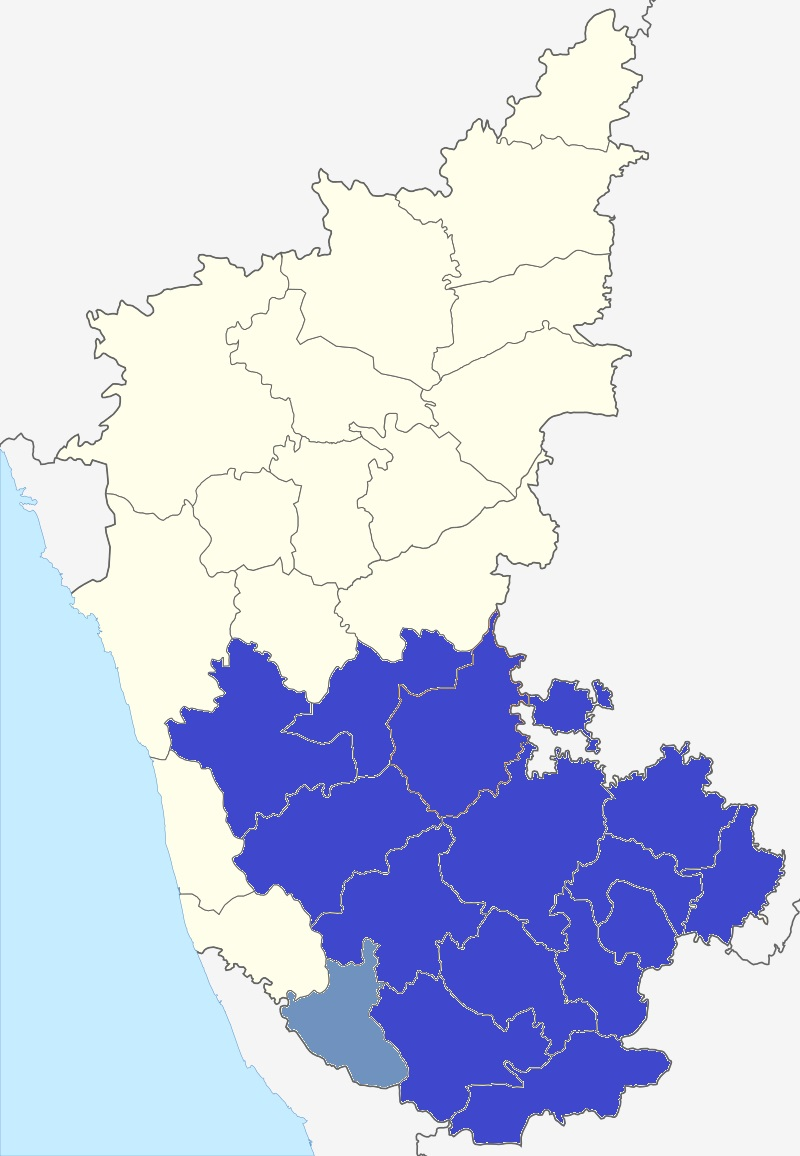
- South Karnataka in Blue, Kodagu in Light blue
- Country: India
- State: Karnataka
- Region: Old Mysore Region
- Largest city: Bengaluru
- Headquarter: Bengaluru

Area
  - Total: 84,969 km^{2} (32,807 sq mi)
  - Rank: 2nd:Karnataka

Population (2011)
  - Total: 31,819,889
  - Rank: 1st:Karnataka
  - Density: 374.49/km^{2} (969.92/sq mi)
- Demonym: Dakshina Kannadiga

Languages
  - Official: Kannada
- Time zone: UTC+5:30 (IST)
- Vehicle registration: KA
- Sex ratio: 965 ♂/♀
- Literacy: 76%

South Karnataka generally refers to the southern part of Karnataka state, excluding the coastal areas. It generally corresponds to former Mysore state. It is generally referred as Hale Mysuru Region in Kannada which translates to Old Mysore Region or OMR . Kannada dialect of South Karnataka is slightly different as compared to North Karnataka.

== Districts ==
There are 15 districts in South Karnataka:

- Bengaluru Urban
- Bengaluru Rural
- Chikkaballapur
- Kolar
- Mysuru
- Mandya
- Kodagu
- Hassan
- Chikmagalur
- Shivamogga
- Tumakuru
- Chitradurga
- Davanagere
- Chamarajanagar
- Ramanagara

== See also ==
- Bangalore Division
- Bayalu Seeme
- North Karnataka
- Coastal Karnataka
