= Akkajihalli =

Coordinates: 13°30′N 77°22′E

- village
- Akkajihalli is in Tumkur district
- Interactive map of Akkajihalli
- Country: India
- State: Karnataka
- District: Tumkur
- Talukas: Koratagere

Government
  - Body: Village Panchayat

Languages
  - Official: Kannada
- Time zone: UTC+5:30 (IST)
- Nearest city: Tumkur
- Civic agency: Village Panchayat

Akkajihalli is a village in the southern state of Karnataka, India. It is located in the Koratagere taluk of Tumkur district in Karnataka.

== See also ==
- Tumkur
- Districts of Karnataka
