= A. Venkatapura =

- village
- Location in Karnataka, India A. Venkatapura (India)
- Coordinates: 13.521697°N 77.231333°E
- Country: India
- State: Karnataka
- District: Tumkur
- Talukas: Koratagere

Government
  - Body: Village Panchayat

Languages
  - Official: Kannada
- Time zone: UTC+5:30 (IST)
- Nearest city: Tumkur
- Civic agency: Village Panchayat

A. Venkatapura is a village in the southern state of Karnataka, India. It is located in the Koratagere taluk of Tumkur district in Karnataka.

a venkatapura is a village in grama devathe Sri adhishakthi Kolagadammadevi And Sri Vadasalammadevi Sisters In Village Temple

== See also ==
- Tumkur
- Districts of Karnataka
