= Yoganarasimha Temple, Devarayanadurga =

Yoganarasimha Temple
- Temple
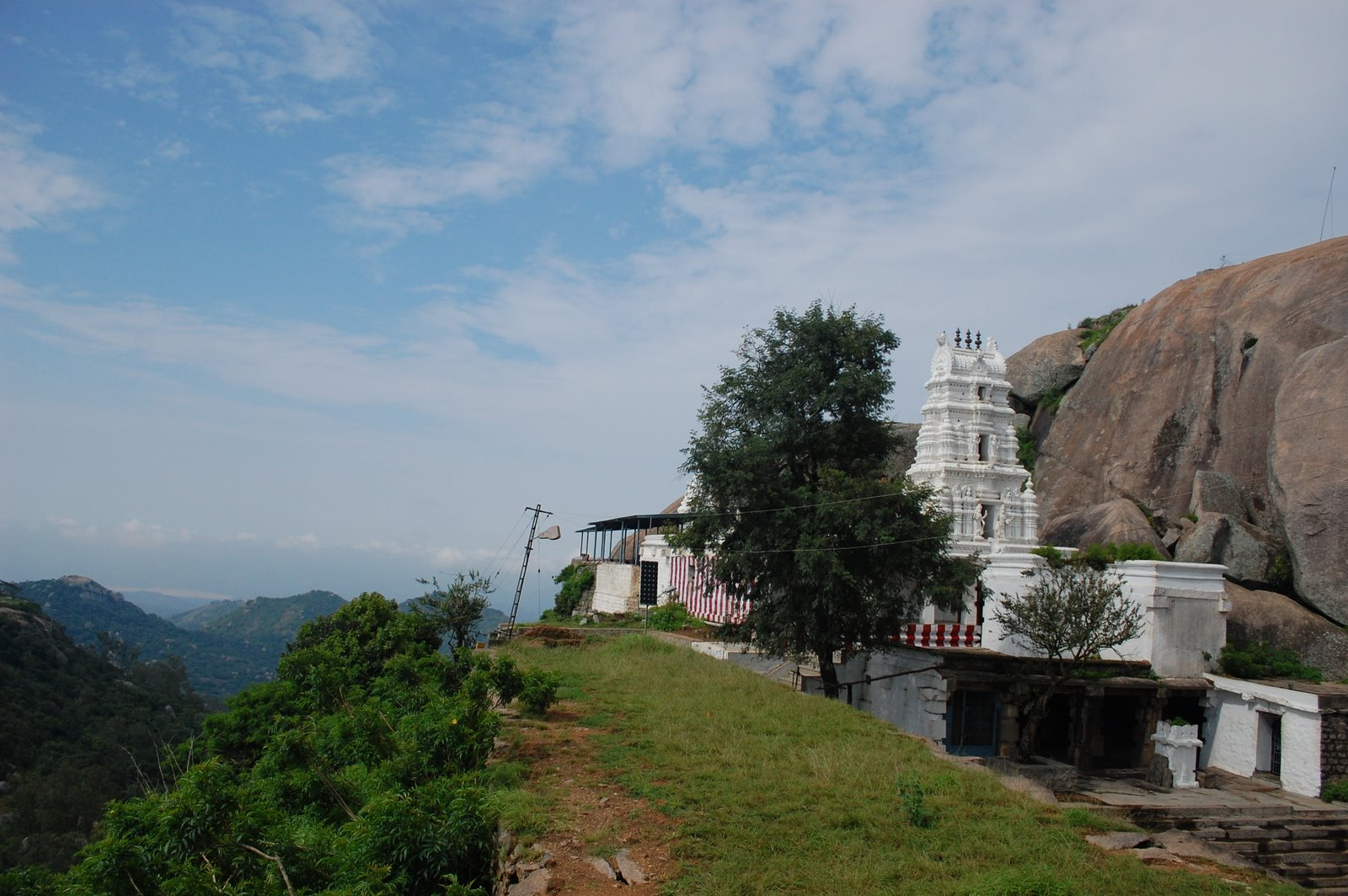
- Yoganarasimha Temple in Devarayanadurga

- Location in Karnataka, India
- Coordinates: 13.375°N 77.213°E
- Country: India
- State: Karnataka
- District: Tumkur

Languages
  - Official: Kannada
- Time zone: UTC+5:30 (IST)
- PIN: 572 146
- Telephone code: 0816
- Vehicle registration: KA-06

Yoganarsimha Temple is a Hindu Temple located in hill station Devarayanadurga near Tumkur in the state of Karnataka in India. Situated on the hilltop, surrounded by other hills and forests, the temple is dedicated to God Narsimha and Lakshmi. There is a Kalyani (well) near the temple.
