= Bengaluru division =

Coordinates: 12.9667°N 77.5667°E

Bangalore Division Bengaluru Division
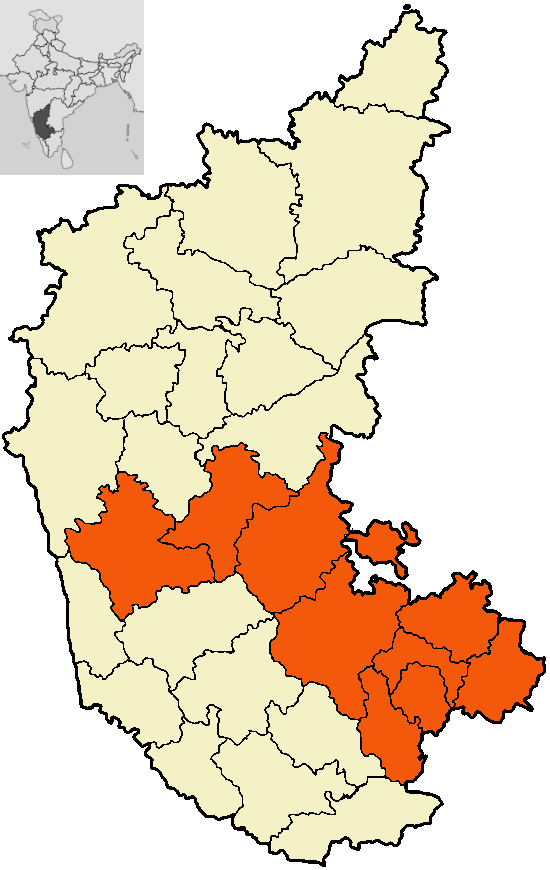
- Bangalore Division in Karnataka
- Country: India
- State: Karnataka
- Region: Malenadu; Bayalu Seeme
- Headquarters: Bangalore
- District: Bangalore Urban; Bengaluru South; Bengaluru North; Chikkaballapur; Chitradurga; Davanagere; Kolar; Shimoga; Tumakuru

Government
  - Type: Divisional Administration
  - Body: Bangalore Divisional Commissioner

Area
  - Total: 49,936 km^{2} (19,280 sq mi)
  - Rank: 1

Population (2011)
  - Total: 22,523,301
  - Rank: 1
  - Density: 451.04/km^{2} (1,168.2/sq mi)

Languages
  - Official: Kannada
- Time zone: UTC+5:30 (IST)
- Website: www.karnataka.gov.in/english

Bangalore Division, officially Bengaluru division, is one of the four divisions of the Indian state Karnataka. The division comprises the districts of Bengaluru Urban, Bengaluru South, Bengaluru North, Chikkaballapur, Chitradurga, Davanagere, Kolar, Shimoga, and Tumakuru.The total area of the division is 49,936 km^{2}. The total population as of 2011 census is 22,523,301, making it the world's fifth most populous sub-division.

== See also ==
- Bayalu Seeme
- Cauvery Wildlife Sanctuary
- Deccan Plateau
- Deccan thorn scrub forests
- Districts of Karnataka
- South Karnataka

=== People ===
- Kenneth Anderson (writer)
- Major General Richard Stewart Dobbs
