= Akkirampura =

- village
- Country: India
- State: Karnataka

Languages
  - Official: Kannada
- Time zone: UTC+5:30 (IST)

Akkirampura is a small village in the district of Tumkur and the taluk of Koratagere in Karnataka, India. Housing some 500-600 families, it is a valley in between the Madhugiri hill range and the Jayamangali River which feeds the farms in this village.

Village has three ancient monuments which are recognised by the archaeological department of the Indian government. Kari Timappa temple and Mylara Linga temple and a well beside the temple is always full whatever the season.

== Etymology ==
The village was like a rice bowl in the previous centuries for the surrounding towns. The quality of the mud and the abundance of available water has made the lands fertile to grow paddy which is called as "Akki" in Kannada, the regional language.

The main temple at the entrance of the village was built by a person called Rama so the village get its name as "Akki-ramapura".

== Governance ==
It is a Karnataka government recognised grama panchayat.

The village has a middle school and a high school.

Muslims are almost 1/4 of the total population. Sante is held in the village every Saturday.

== Sources ==
- Govt of India: National Population Register - Akkirampura, Tumkur
- Jain Heritage Centres: Akkirampura
