= Kadaba, Tumkur =

Kadaba
- Village
- Country: India
- State: Karnataka
- District: Tumkur

Languages
  - Official: Kannada
- Time zone: UTC+5:30 (IST)

Kadaba is a village in Tumkur district, Karnataka, India.

== Demographics ==
Per the 2011 Census of India, Kadaba has a total population of 3573; of whom 1759 are male and 1814 female.
