= Amruthur =

Amurthur amruthuru
- Town
- Location in Karnataka, India Amurthur (India)
- Coordinates: 12.92°N 76.93°E
- Country: India
- State: Karnataka
- District: Tumkur district

Government
  - Body: Panchayath
- Elevation: 670 m (2,200 ft)

Population (2011)
  - Total: 11,201

Languages
  - Official: Kannada
- Time zone: UTC+5:30 (IST)
- PIN: 572 111
- Telephone code: 08132

Amruthur is a town (hobli) in Kunigal taluk, Tumkur district, Karnataka, India. It is situated in a valley created by the rivers Shimsha, Veera-vaishnavi and Nagini. It is irrigated by the Markonhalli and Mangala reservoirs and a series of tanks. Amruthur is surrounded by paddy fields and areca-nut gardens. To the south of the village are two lakes that also serve as a source of irrigation.

Amruthur is at a distance of 73 km from the state capital, Bangalore. Its climate is similar to that of Bangalore. It is well connected through the National Highway NH-48 (Bangalore - Mangalore highway). There are many ancient temples in Amruthur, like the Sri Rameshwara temple, Sri Channakeshava temple, Sri Anjaneya temple, Sri Srinivasa temple, Sri Kanyaka Parameswari and the temple of the village deity, Pattaladamma Hosapalya.

== Freedom struggle ==
Amruthur was involved in India's freedom struggle from the British empire. Even before Mysore State Congress was formed, delegates from Amruthur attended the 1924 Belgaum Session of the Indian National Congress where Mahatma Gandhi was also present. Many people from Amruthur had participated in the 1942 Quit India Movement and had been arrested by the British government. Shri Obedulla Khan Shirani, Shri. Ramurti Inoor, Shri. Ramanna Gowda and Shri. Gulli Gowda, had a key role in developing the village.

== Cooperative and banking movement ==
In 1911, Sri Rama Mandiram Cooperative Society was started. This provided banking and credit facilities to the people of Amruthur. It is managed by an elected body. In the 1960s, the Ryots Cooperative Society and the Housing Cooperative Society were formed to help the farmer community of the area. Also, in the 1960s, Canara Bank opened a branch in Amruthur. In the 1970s, as a part of the White Revolution, the Milk Producers Cooperative Society was started. Many local farmers took up to dairy as a profession.

== Healthcare facilities ==
A hospital was established in Amruthur in 1930. The hospital was upgraded in accordance with the plan of the Government of India in the 1960s and more staff was posted. Private wards were added with the donations of philanthropists of Amruthur. In the 1960s a veterinary hospital was established.

== Electricity and drinking water supply ==
Amruthur received the benefits of water supply and electricity from the 1950s. A Section Office for the Karnataka Electricity Board is also present in Amruthur. With the aid of the World Bank, it has been further improved.

== Education facilities ==
Amruthur had educational facilities since the 1920s. There were separate schools for girls and boys up to Lower Secondary levels (this translates to 7th standard or 7th grade). A private high school (Nehru High School) was started in the 1950s. The Government Junior College was started in the 1970s offering PUC (Pre-University College) courses in science, arts and commerce. Educational institutions from kindergarten up to 10th standard were started in 1982 under the auspices of the Amruthur Education Institution. In 2008, this was expanded to include a junior college offering Commerce and Arts courses.

== Other facilities ==
A Post office was established in the 1930s. This was converted to a sub-office in 1960 with telegraphy facility. In the 1960s, Amruthur got telephone services with a Public Call Office (PCO) which later became an automatic telephone exchange. Amruthur has STD (national calling) and ISD (international calling) services, and different Telecom operators provide cellphone services. Two gas stations are also present in the village.

== State Highways ==
Amruthur is well connected to other parts of Karnataka through the following state highway: SH-84 : Highway connecting Sira with Nanjangud via Gubbi, Kallur, Yadayur, Amruthur, Mandya, Kirugaval, Hosavatti and T. Narsipura.
