= Richard Stewart Dobbs =

- Born: 10 May 1808
- Died: 26 September 1888 (aged 80)
- Occupations: British civil servant; major-general, 9th Regiment of the Madras Native Infantry
- Known for: First Superintendent of the Chittledroog (Chitradurga) Division, princely state of Mysore; namesake of Dobbspet
- Spouse: Jane Margaret Cathcart
- Children: 11

Richard Stewart Dobbs (10 May 1808 – 26 September 1888), son of Richard Stewart Dobbs and Harriet Macauley, was a British civil servant. He served as the first Superintendent of Chittledroog (Chitradurga) Division, in the princely state of Mysuru (Mysore), British India, from 1834 to 1861. Tumakuru was the then headquarters of this division. He later became a Major-General in the 9th Regiment of the Madras Native Infantry. A small town, Dobbspet, located in the Nelamangala taluk of Bengaluru district, is named after him.

He said a major success during his administration was in nabbing most of the professional robbers (Lambanis, Koramas and Korachas) in the Chitradurga – Tumakuru region.

He was a shikari and would hunt in and around Devarayanadurga hill and forests. He wrote of the presence of sambur (which the British of that time referred to as elk) near the Devarayanadurga hill top, apart from tigers in the forests around the hill. According to Dobbs, an entire dead blackbuck would be available at the Tumakuru market for four annas (approximately 25 paise or 1/4 of an Indian Rupee). This common antelope was so abundant in the areas surrounding Devarayanadurga, that one British officer shot 200 of them within a few days.

He devised a new method of trapping tigers of which there plenty in the region those days. British officers also indulged in ‘pig-sticking’ or spear hunting of wild boar as well as shooting sloth bears in the division. He narrates that the reduction of tigers and leopards in the division due to hunting led to an increase in wild boar which damaged sugarcane plantations. A tiger that was killed about four miles from Tumakuru city was skinned and the skin was gifted to a family friend in Scotland.

The bungalow he built atop the hill is used as a police wireless communication centre.

== Personal life ==
He was married to Jane Margaret Cathcart (15 April 1811–24 January 1892) on 18 April 1834. The couple had eleven children, eight sons and three daughters.

His body is buried in the Redford Cemetery, Greystones, County Wicklow, Ireland.

== See also ==
- Bangalore Division
- Bayalu Seeme
- Kenneth Anderson (writer)
