= Buchanahalli =

Village in Tumakuru district, Karnataka

Buchanahalli is a village in Tumkur district, Karnataka, India. At the 2011 census it had a population of 154 in 40 households.
