= Korahalli =

Korhalli Koralli
- Village
- Location in Karnataka, India Korhalli (India)
- Coordinates: 17.02°N 76.21°E
- Country: India
- State: Karnataka
- Region: Bayalu Seeme
- District: Bijapur District
- Taluk: Almel
- Elevation: 516 m (1,693 ft)

Population (2011)
  - Total: 2,803

Languages
  - Official language: Kannada
- Time zone: UTC+5:30 (IST)
- PIN: 586202
- Telephone code: +91-8488
- ISO 3166 code: IN-KA
- Vehicle registration: KA:28
- Nearest City: Sindagi
- Lok Sabha constituency: Bijapur
- Vidhan Sabha constituency: Sindagi

Korhalli is a large village located in Almel Taluk in Bijapur District of Karnataka State, India.

== Geography ==
Korhalli or Koralli is located at 17.02°N 76.21°E, with an average elevation of 516 meters (1693 feet) about 74 kilometres (46 mi) towards East from District headquarters Bijapur, 13 kilometres (8.1 mi) from Sindagi and 554 kilometres (344 mi) from State capital Bengaluru. It comes under Korhalli Panchayath. It belongs to Belgaum Division. Karnataka with total 494 families residing. The Korhalli village has population of 2803 of which 1470 are males while 1333 are females as per Population Census 2011.

== Demographics ==
As of 2001 India census, Korhalli had a population of 2,803 with 1,470 Males and 1,333 Females. In Korhalli village population of children with age 0-6 is 391 which makes up 13.95% of total population of village. Average Sex Ratio of Korhalli village is 907 which is lower than Karnataka state average of 973. Child Sex Ratio for the Korhalli as per census is 917, lower than Karnataka average of 948. Korhalli village has lower literacy rate compared to Karnataka. In 2011, literacy rate of Korhalli village was 62.35% compared to 75.36% of Karnataka. In Korhalli Male literacy stands at 73.38% while female literacy rate was 50.17%.

As per constitution of India and Panchyati Raaj Act, Korhalli village is administrated by Sarpanch (Head of Village) who is elected representative of village.

== See also ==
- Bijapur
- Districts of Karnataka
- Sindagi
- Bengaluru
- Muddebihal
- Almel
