= Kottanahalli =

Coordinates: 12°38′N 77°02′E

- Village
- Location in Karnataka, India Kottanahalli (India)
- Country: India
- State: Karnataka
- District: Tumkur
- Taluk: Tumkur

Government
  - Type: Panchayat Raj
  - Body: Gram Panchayat

Languages
  - Official: Kannada
- Time zone: UTC+5:30 (IST)
- PIN: 572107
- Telephone code: 91-(0)816
- Vehicle registration: KA-06
- Nearest city: Tumkur
- Lok Sabha constituency: Tumkur
- Vidhan Sabha Constituency: Tumkur Rural

Kottanahalli is a small village situated in Doddanaravangala Panchayat of Tumkur District, Karnataka. It is approximately 10 km from the city of Tumkur and 0.9 miles (1.4 km) from Mallasandra on NH73 between Tumkur-Gubbi. It is a tribal village; along with Doranakatte and Chilakahalli, it was cut off from supplies during the COVID-19 pandemic.

== See also ==
- Mallasandra
- Tumkur
