= Marconahalli =

Marconahalli is in the Tumkur district in India.

Located near Amruturu, a dam has been built across the Shimsha river forming the biggest reservoir in the district. The dam was completed in 1939.
