= Halnoor =

- village
- Country: India
- State: Karnataka
- District: Tumkur

Languages
  - Official: Kannada
- Time zone: UTC+5:30 (IST)
- PIN: 572107
- Vehicle registration: ka 06
- Nearest city: Tumkur
- Lok Sabha constituency: Tumkur

Halnoor is a village in Tumkur taluk, Karnataka, 13 km from Tumkur and 3.2 km (2.0 mi) from Mallasandra.

== Economy ==
Agriculture is the primary industry in Halnoor; crops include coconut, areca, paddy, jowar, vegetables, flowers, tamarind, mango and sapota. There are also some small scale Industries.

Irrigation needs are supplied by two area lakes, one of which is fed with Hemavathi channel water.

== Tourism ==
Malleshwara Swamy Temple which is in Halnoor is a major religious place for the Hindus around Halnoor, it has Jathra Mahothsava every year after one week of Ugadi festival. Halanuru has temples like Kashi Eshwara, Basavanna temple, Maruthi, and Gramadevathe Maramma.

== Politics ==
Halnoor votes to elect MLA for Tumkur rural constituency, MP for Tumkur constituency and also elects around 7 members for the Mallasandra grama panchayati.

== Education ==
Halnoor has educational institutes which help students for education up to 12th std./2nd P.U.C.and Sanskrit education.
