= Yalachigere =

- Village
- Location in Karnataka, India Yalachigere (India)
- Coordinates: 13.334672°N 77.318172°E
- Country: India
- State: Karnataka

Languages
  - Official: Kannada
- Time zone: UTC+5:30 (IST)

Yalachigere is a village in Tumakuru district, Karnataka, India. It about 20 km (12 mi) from Tumkur and 50 km (31 mi) from Bangalore. Most of the people here are farmers or teachers. Raagi, groundnut and mango are grown here. The village primarily relies on farming as its economic foundation, with many local residents engaged in cultivating crops like ragi (finger millet), groundnuts, and mangoes, which are staples in Karnataka's rural agriculture. Karnataka's government supports these farmers in villages like Yalachigere through various schemes to enhance agricultural productivity and ensure fair pricing for their produce. Programs such as the Raitha Sanjivini insurance scheme and the Support Price Scheme offer financial security and support for farmers by setting minimum prices to prevent distress sales and providing compensation in case of accidents during agricultural activities.
