= Namada Chilume =

Namada chilume
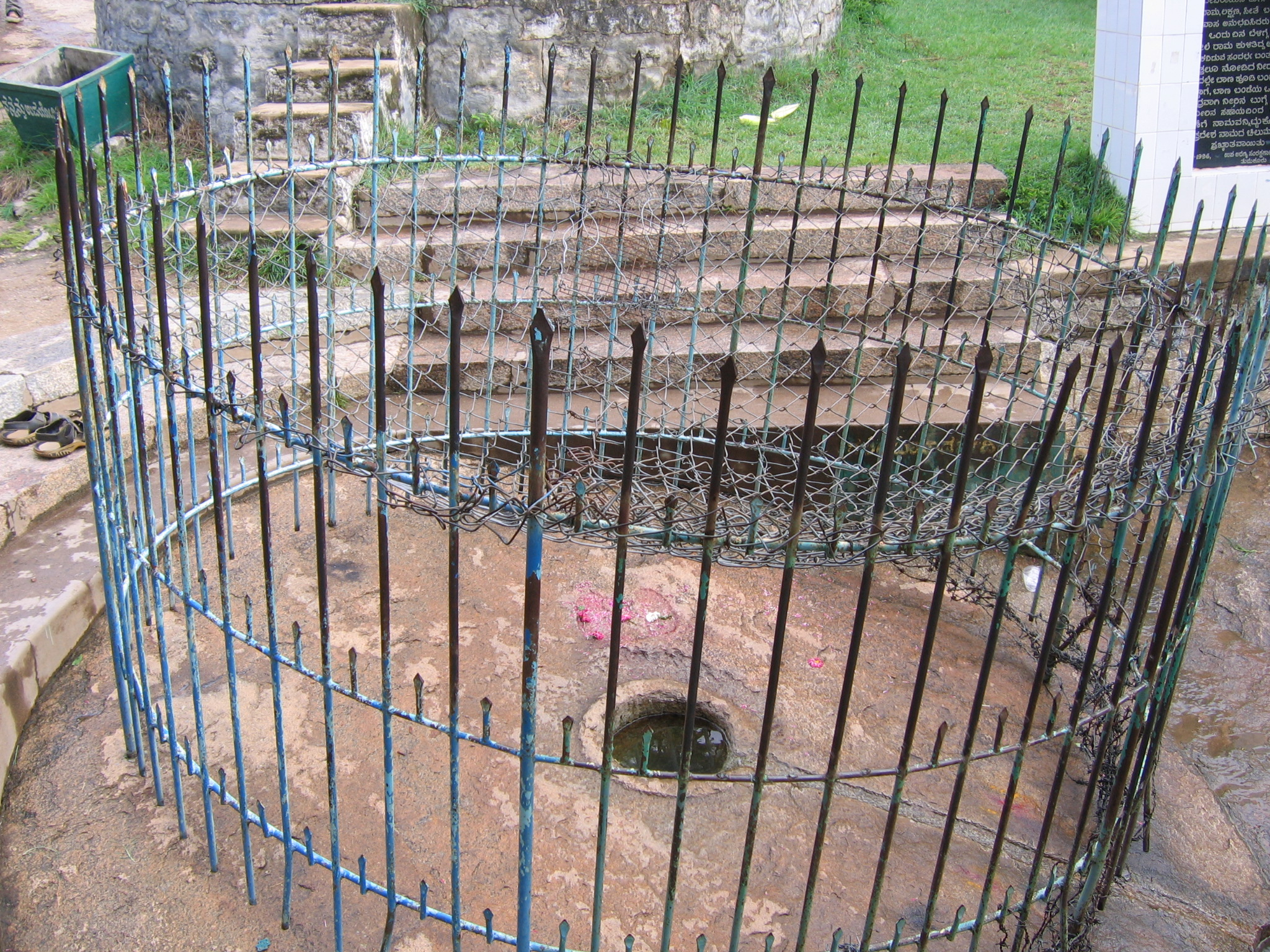
- Country: India
- State: Karnataka
- District: Tumkuru

Languages
  - Official: Kannada
- Time zone: UTC+5:30 (IST)
- PIN: 572 146
- Telephone code: 0816
- ISO 3166 code: IN-KA
- Vehicle registration: KA-06
- Website: karnataka.gov.in

Namada Chilume (pronounced naamada chilume' in Kannada) is a natural spring situated by Devarayanadurga, near Tumkur in the state of Karnataka in India. The spring issues from the surface of the rock. It is believed that Rama, along with Sita and Lakshmana, stayed here during their exile in the forest. Rama searched for water to apply tilaka to his forehead. When he could not find any water, he shot an arrow at the rock. The arrow penetrated the rock, made a hole, and the water came out. Henceforth, this place was called Namada Chilume, meaning "Spring of Tilak". (naama = tilak and chilume' = spring, in Kannada) As shown in the picture, the water comes out from a small hole throughout the year and never dries up. The water that comes out is considered as sacred water (tirtha). It is approximately 14 km from Tumkur and 80 km from Bengaluru.
