= Jayamangali Blackbuck Reserve =

Conservation reserve in Karnataka, India

- Interactive map of Jayamangali Blackbuck Reserve
- Location: Tumkur District, Karnataka, India
- Coordinates: 13°44′20″N 77°19′20″E
- Area: 3.23 km^{2} (1.25 sq mi)

Jayamangali Blackbuck Conservation Reserve is Tumkur district's only notified protected area. It neighbours Talekere, a small village in Madhugiri Taluk, at the north-eastern tip of Tumkur district of Karnataka state, India. This area is a part of the plains of Deccan plateau and borders Anantapur district of Andhra Pradesh. It is a 798-acre (3.23 km^{2}) patch of grassland with Eucalyptus and Acacia auriculiformis. It has the largest contiguous population of blackbuck (Antilope cervicapra) in Karnataka, apart from Ranibennur Blackbuck Sanctuary.

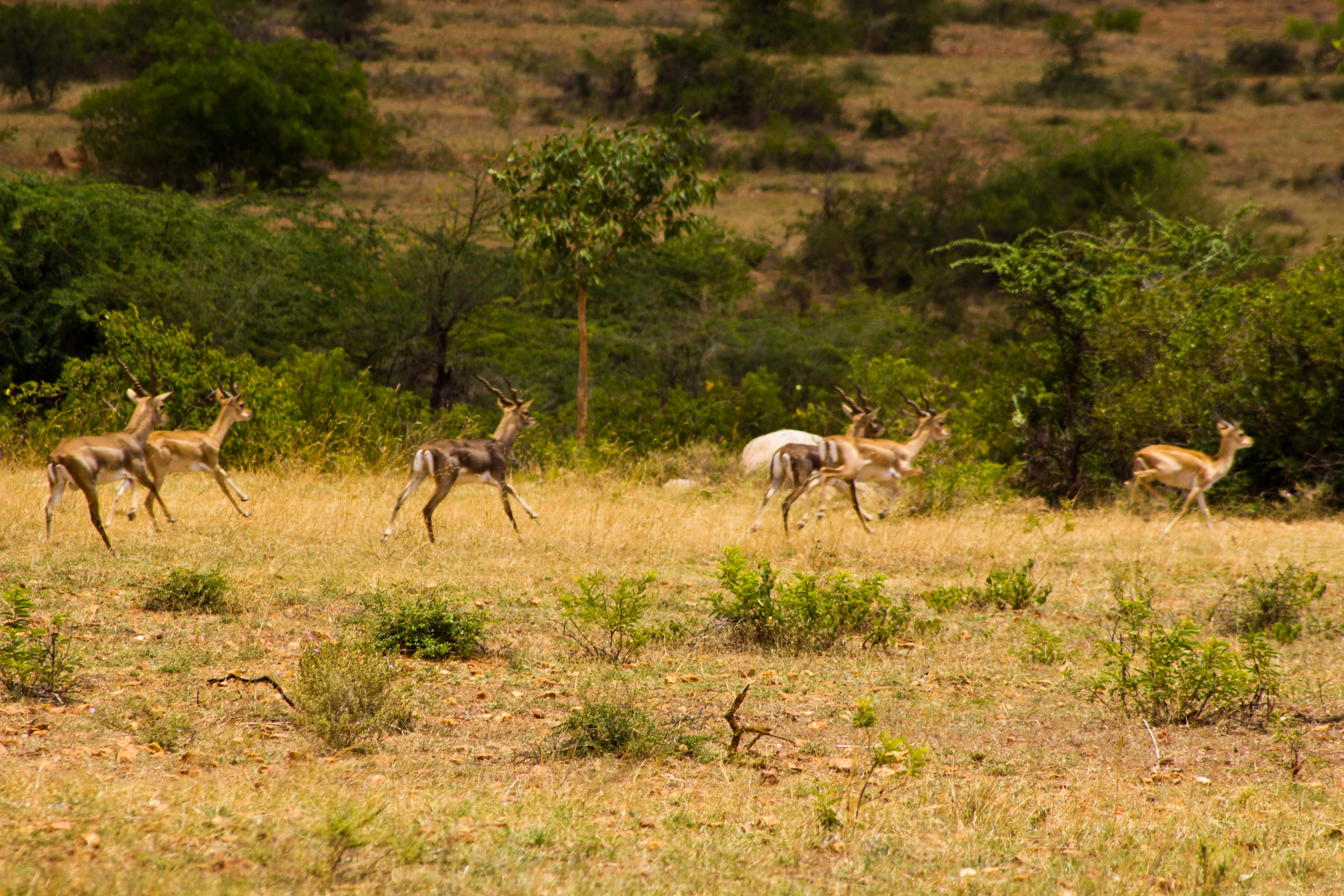
Blackbucks at Jayamangali Blackbuck Reserve

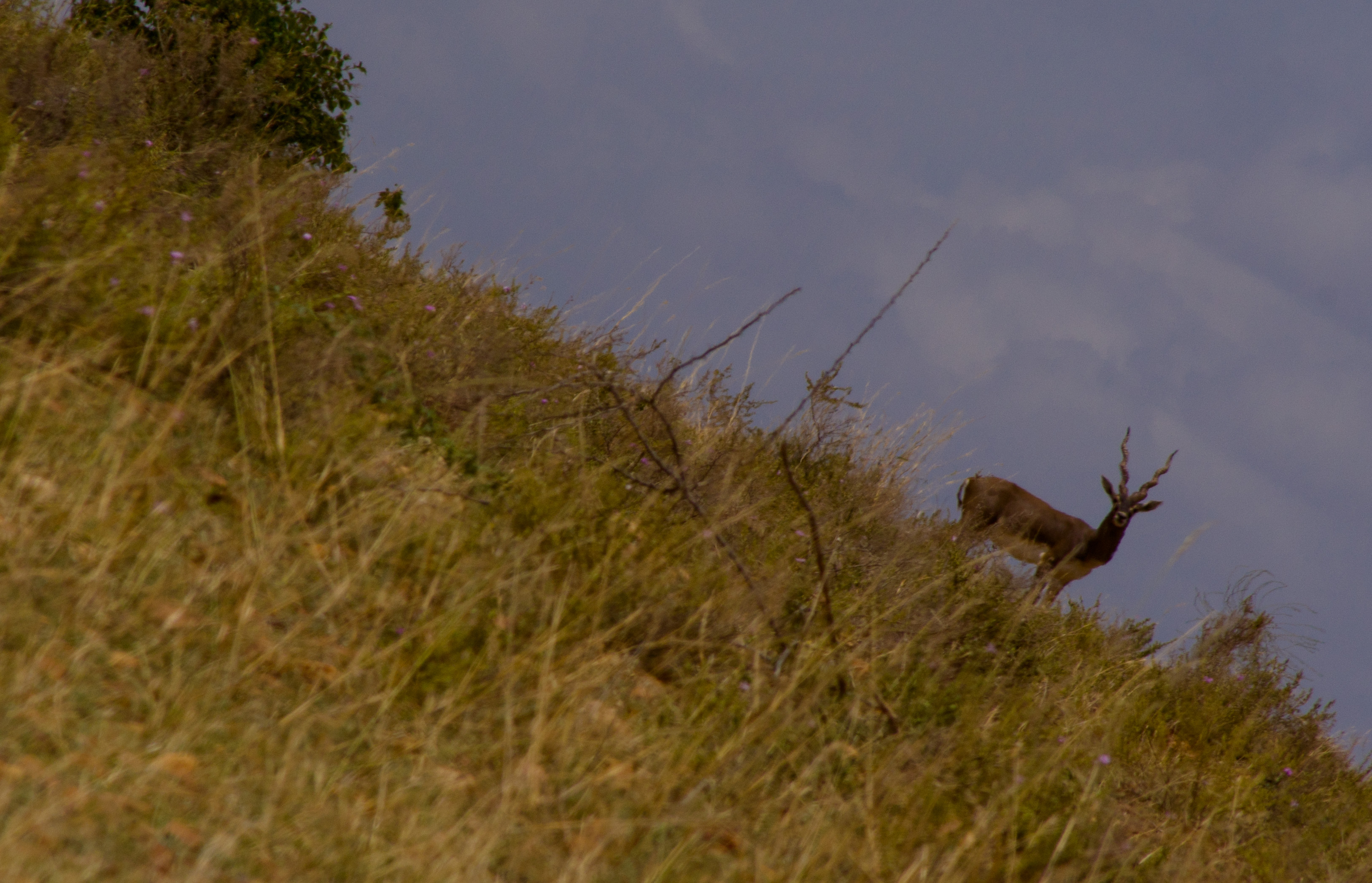
Blackbuck at Jayamangali Conservation, Karnataka

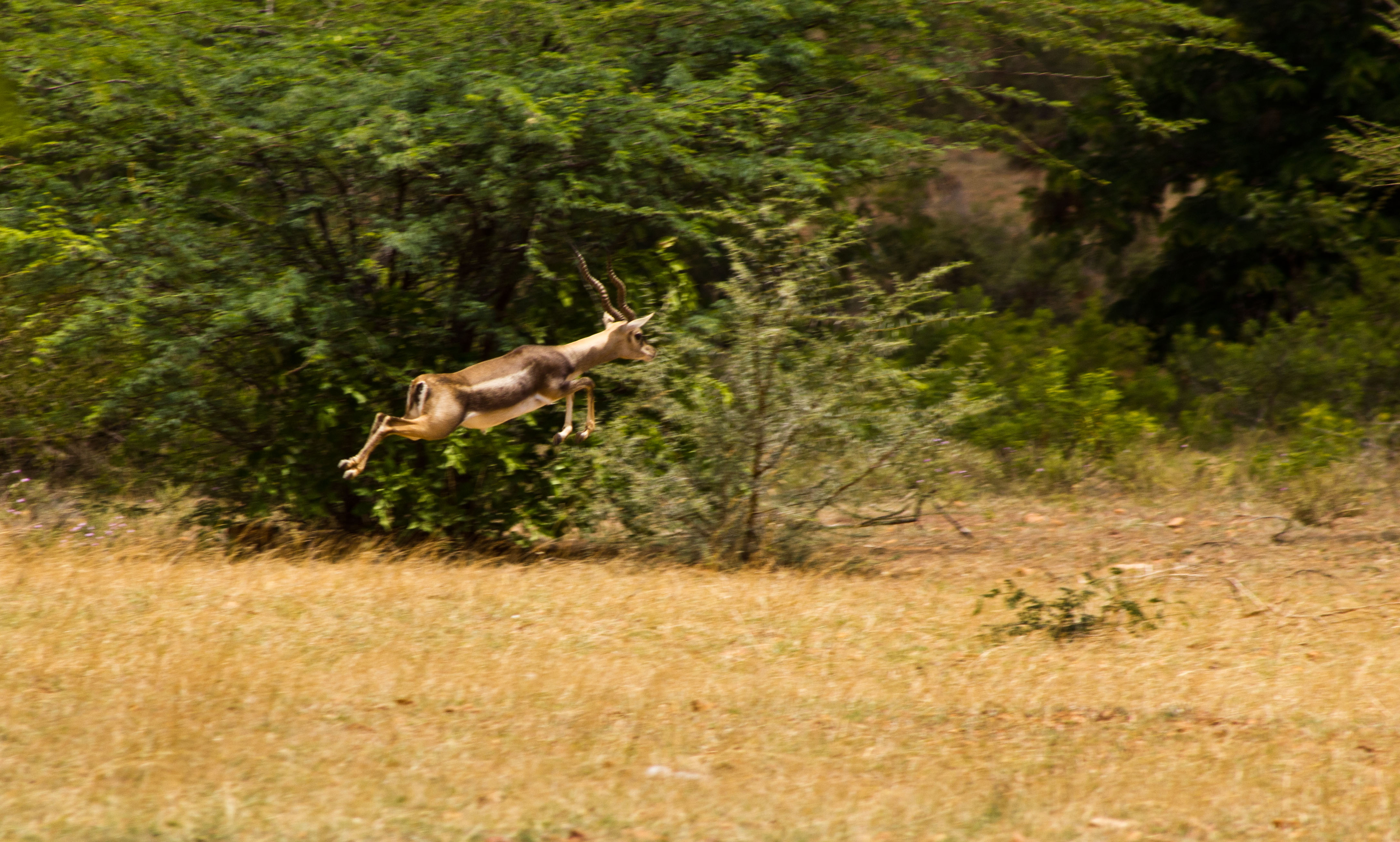
Blackbuck running away is it spots human intervention

== Brief history ==
The open grasslands of peninsular India were once widespread across the Deccan Plateau. Post- independence, however, they have shrunk to isolated patches thanks to immense pressure for cultivation, human habitation and other reasons that also include industrialisation. In 1987, the forest department of Tumakuru Division began protecting the area when the blackbuck’s presence was brought to their notice. In 1992, after sustained efforts by the forest department, the jurisdiction of the area was handed over from the Revenue Department to the Forest Department. The Forest Department then fenced a portion of the area and raised a nursery. A concrete watchtower was erected along with two wood houses and watchmen sheds. But, the ownership of the land still rested with the revenue department.

Tumakuru’s nature lovers worked hard to have the area granted the status of a Protected Area, like a wildlife sanctuary. The first ever Status Survey report on the area was published by Tumakuru-based Wildlife Aware Nature Club (WANC) in 1997. This helped the wildlife wing of Karnataka Forest Department to source data on this area and recommend it be declared a 'Conservation Reserve'. The Government of Karnataka accepted this proposal. In February 2007, vide Government Order No: FEE 342 FWL 05, 798.33 acres (3.2307 km^{2}) of the area was finally notified as Jayamangali Blackbuck Conservation Reserve, (though the original area proposed to be included in this Conservation Reserve was 893 acres). Thus, Tumkur District's first protected area was born.

== Location ==
This area is located 23 km to the north east of Madhugiri town (Karnataka) and about 20 km to the west of Hindupur town (Andhra Pradesh). The geographical co-ordinates of the forest watch tower inside this area are 13 44’ 20" N and 7 19’ 41" E. It is located 4 km away from the Jayamangali Blackbuck Conservation Reserve.

== Climate and vegetation ==
The climate varies greatly according to the seasons- from a minimum of 8 °C (46 °F) in winter to a maximum of 43 °C (109 °F) in summer. The rainy season is from late June to mid-October. The average rainfall is approximately 300–350 mm (12–14 in).

The vegetation is mainly plains grassland.

== Flora and fauna ==
More than 80 species of plants have been recorded from this area. Many of these plants have medicinal value.

=== Butterflies ===
Sixty-seven species of butterflies belonging to seven families have been sighted in the area. Most of the species recorded are common throughout the Indian Peninsula and some are typical of the arid regions.

=== Mammals ===
Jayamangali Blackbuck Conservation Reserve has the second largest contiguous population of blackbuck in Karnataka, after Ranibennur Blackbuck Sanctuary. In total, 19 species of mammals belonging to 11 families have been recorded in the area, including the near threatened blackbuck. The first ever census of Jayamangali blackbuck reserve was jointly conducted by the members of WANC and Karnataka Forest Department in the area on 15–16 November 1997, during which a population of 408 blackbuck was recorded. A subsequent census was held by the above on 1–2 October 2002, which revealed a population of over 600 blackbuck.

Apart from the blackbuck, other mammals present in the area includes Indian wolf, bonnet macaque, jungle cat, small Indian civet, Indian gray mongoose, two species of bats, the Indian fox, the Indian hare, and six species of rodents.

Nearby villager shepherds narrate incidents of a leopard attacking their dog. Sloth bear and Wild boar are also noted by these shepherds. Mongrel [dogs] have started hunting in packs.

=== Avifauna ===
About 125 species of birds belonging to 37 families have been recorded in the area, of which 22 are migratory. As expected of grasslands, the area is rich in ground birds, shrikes, larks and raptors. This is one of the few habitats in Tumkur District where the Indian courser and painted sandgrouse have been seen. The Montagu's harrier also winters here between the months of November and January. Some of the surrounding villagers claim to have seen the Great Indian bustard in the past. Although none of the authors nor any birdwatchers have seen the bird in the area, efforts are on to sight this highly threatened species.

=== Reptiles ===
Since it is a grassland, it has a large number of reptiles typical of dry areas/plains. About 26 species have been recorded in the area, including 14 different species of snakes.
