= Kunigal Stud Farm =

Horse stud farm in India

Kunigal Stud Farm is a stud farm located in the town of Kunigal in the Indian state of Karnataka. This farm is used for breeding horses mainly for racing and is the oldest stud farm in India. The history of this farm can be traced back to the times of Tipu Sultan, the ruler of Srirangapatna who used it to breed horses for his cavalry to fight against the British.

== History ==
The farm was created by Tipu Sultan for breeding horses for his wars in the 1790s. After his death, the farm was used by the British Army to breed horses, mainly Arabian horses for their cavalry regiments. In 1886, the farm also housed Pero Gomez, the first-ever thoroughbred stallion to be imported into India. Subsequently, the horses were also bred for racing and these horses started to challenge the supremacy of horses imported from United Kingdom and Australia as well. The imperial government held control of the farm during the period under the superintendence of Colonel Hay, General Stewart, Colonel McIntire, Colonel A. A. Jones and Colonel R. J. Jones among others. It was then transferred to the Military Department of the Kingdom of Mysore before transferring to the government of Mysore state in 1948. In 1992, the Government of Karnataka leased the farm to the industrialist Vijay Mallya's race horse division of United Racing and Bloodstock Breeders (URBB).

== Stud Farm ==
The farm is spread across 400 acres (1.6 km^{2}) and is divided into 25 paddocks of different sizes. Good pasture is maintained and plants needed for fodder like Alfalfa, Green oats and Rhodes grass are grown here. Training facilities for horses including a riding school is present in the farm. The farm also contains a water purification plant and medical care for horses are provided by veterinarians.

== Horses ==
Vijay Mallya has imported many stallions from abroad which are housed in the farm. The first stallion to be imported was Bold Russian who had won many races in the United Kingdom and the U.S. Brave Act and Tejano are other prominent stallions that were imported. Probably, the most famous Indian thoroughbred to emerge from this farm was Adler who remained undefeated in all the nine races that he competed in India. Adler is also the first Indian thoroughbred to win a race in the U.S. The farm also houses some winning broodmares like Littleover, Starfire Girl and Supervite. Saddle Up, a thoroughbred from this farm has won many races in India and also in Singapore and Malaysia. Another famous horse bred in this farm has been Burden of Proof whose progeny has won many races.

== Achievements ==
Kunigal Stud Farm has been awarded the Leading Stud Farm award in the Bangalore race season held in the year 2006 with 31 winners and also in the year 2007 with 39 winners.
