= Kallur, Tumkur =

Kallur
- Village
- Interactive map of Kallur
- Country: India
- State: Karnataka
- District: Tumkur

Government
  - Type: Panchayati raj (India)
  - Body: Gram panchayat

Languages
  - Official: Kannada
- Time zone: UTC+5:30 (IST)
- ISO 3166 code: IN-KA
- Vehicle registration: KA
- Nearest city: Gubbi
- Lok Sabha constituency: Tumkur
- Vidhan Sabha constituency: Turuvekere
- Website: karnataka.gov.in

Kallur is a village in the Gubbi subdistrict of the Tumkur district of Karnataka state in India. It has a Gram Panchayat. The village is located on the bank of the Shimsha river. It is mainly known for its handloom silk sarees. The handloom work is performed traditionally, using a technique passed down from their ancestors (called Vamshya parampare). The major caste in this village is Hindu Devanga and (lingayatha).

== Attractions ==
Major attractions in this village are Sri Rama Mandira (Temple), Sri Rudra muni Swamy temple, Vasudeva Temple and Doddamma temple and Kallur Lake. In the Rama Mandira temple the deities are made of white stone (called Amrutha shile). Panduranga (Vijaya Vittal) temple built in recent days in 2009 is also of interest.

== Festivals ==
The village is also famous for an annual Festival called Doddaammana Habba (festival) which is celebrated 21 days after the festival of ugadi. People from all over Karnataka gather to seek the blessing of Goddess Doddamma. A major attraction of the festival used to be a bull sacrifice for the Goddess, which has now been stopped.

== Institutions ==
A Pre-University College called SVS Gangothri Pre University College (with management at Chikkakallur), Siddaganga High School (Siddaganga mutt's school) and Pragathi Schools are major private educational institutions in the village.

== Notable residents ==
K G Nagarajappa, is poet and literary figure from this village. He received the Rajyotsava award in the year 2015.

Nataraj K G, is a social server who has donated his agricultural land for the construction of a hospital, built roads, and ensured mobile connectivity for the village.

Shankara Shetty K N, also known as "Parisara Premi", is a Karnataka environmentalist from the district of Tumkur, noted for his work in planting and tending thousands of trees with the support of his students along with a huge number of campaigns to save trees. His work has been honoured with the Rashtrapati Award of India for Best Teacher(2014). His work was also recognized by the Government of India and he was conferred with Vinayak Damodar Savarkar Award in 2013(Andaman & Nicobar) and Bhagavan Budha National Fellowship Award from Chaitanya Academy New Delhi in 2012, Best Teacher Award from the Karnataka State Government and he continues to plant trees with the help of the villagers.
