= Mallasandra =

- Village
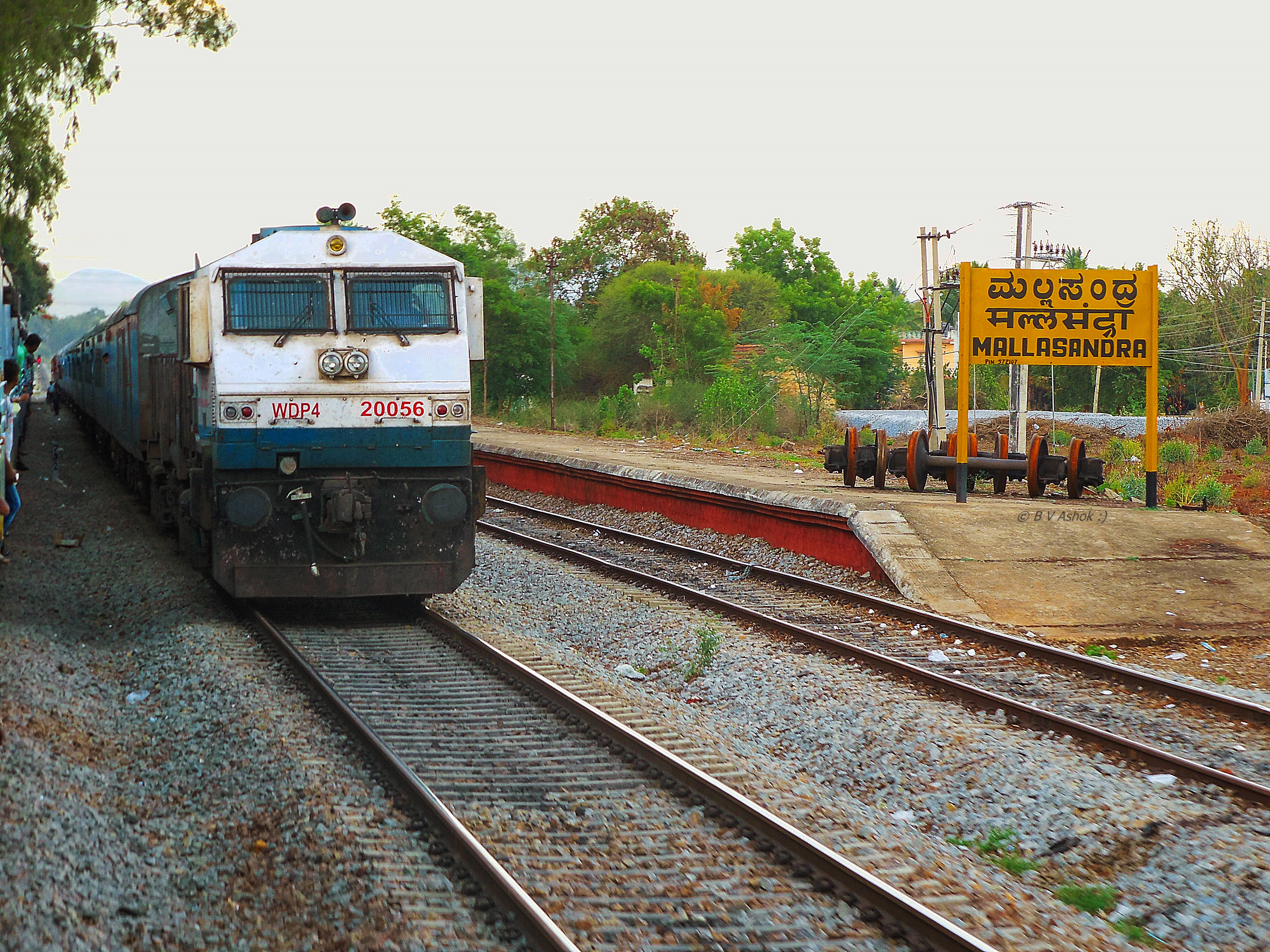
- Mallasandra Train Station
- Interactive map of Mallasandra
- Country: India
- State: Karnataka
- District: Tumkur
- Talukas: Tumkur

Government
  - Type: Panchayat raj
  - Body: Gram panchayat

Languages
  - Official: Kannada
- Time zone: UTC+5:30 (IST)
- PIN: 572107
- Telephone code: 91-(0)816
- ISO 3166 code: IN-KA
- Vehicle registration: KA-06
- Nearest city: Tumkur
- Lok Sabha constituency: Tumkur
- Vidhana Sabha constituency: Tumkur Rural
- Website: karnataka.gov.in

Mallasandra is a village in Tumkur Taluk, Karnataka, 10 km from Tumkur City on NH-73 (BH Road) towards Gubbi.

== Economy ==
Due to good transport infrastructure, it is a major business hub for neighboring small villages. It has both rail station and National Highway 73 alongside which is a major attraction for people to settle or look for accommodation. Karnataka Milk Federation also known as Nandhini is one of the source of employment for local people.

== Education ==
Mallasandra has educational institutes which help students for education up to bachelor's degree.

Major educational institutions are Vishwa Bharathi School and St.Joseph's Public School

== St.Joseph's School and College ==
St.Joseph's Group was founded in the Year 1996. The Trust runs in all about 10 educational institutions from kinder garten to postgraduate courses.

- St.Joseph's Public School
- St.Joseph's English Medium High school
- St.Joseph's International Science & Techno School
- St.Joseph's PU College
- St.Joseph's D.Ed(TCH) College

== Tumkur Co-operative Milk Producers' Societies' Union Limited. ==
The Tumkur District known for historical temples and Educational Institutions is known for its coconut, a major commercial crop apart from groundnut, adopting Dairying as one of the main occupations with initiation of Dairy activities in 1975 today has more than 927 functioning DCS covering 10 talukas.

It has chilling centers at yediur-20 TLPD, sira-20 TLPD, kibbanahalli-60 TLPD and madhugira-60 TLPD.Total chilling capacity 160 TLPD. There is Bulk Milk Collars -20, Automatic Milk Collection-264 in the union

The union procures on an AVG3.89lac kg/day of milk and sales 1.84lac litres/per

Speciality of the Union: First milk union to turn around after availing the financial assistance under rehabilitation scheme.

Halnoor
