= Devarayanadurga =

Devarayanadurga Jadakanadurga
- Village
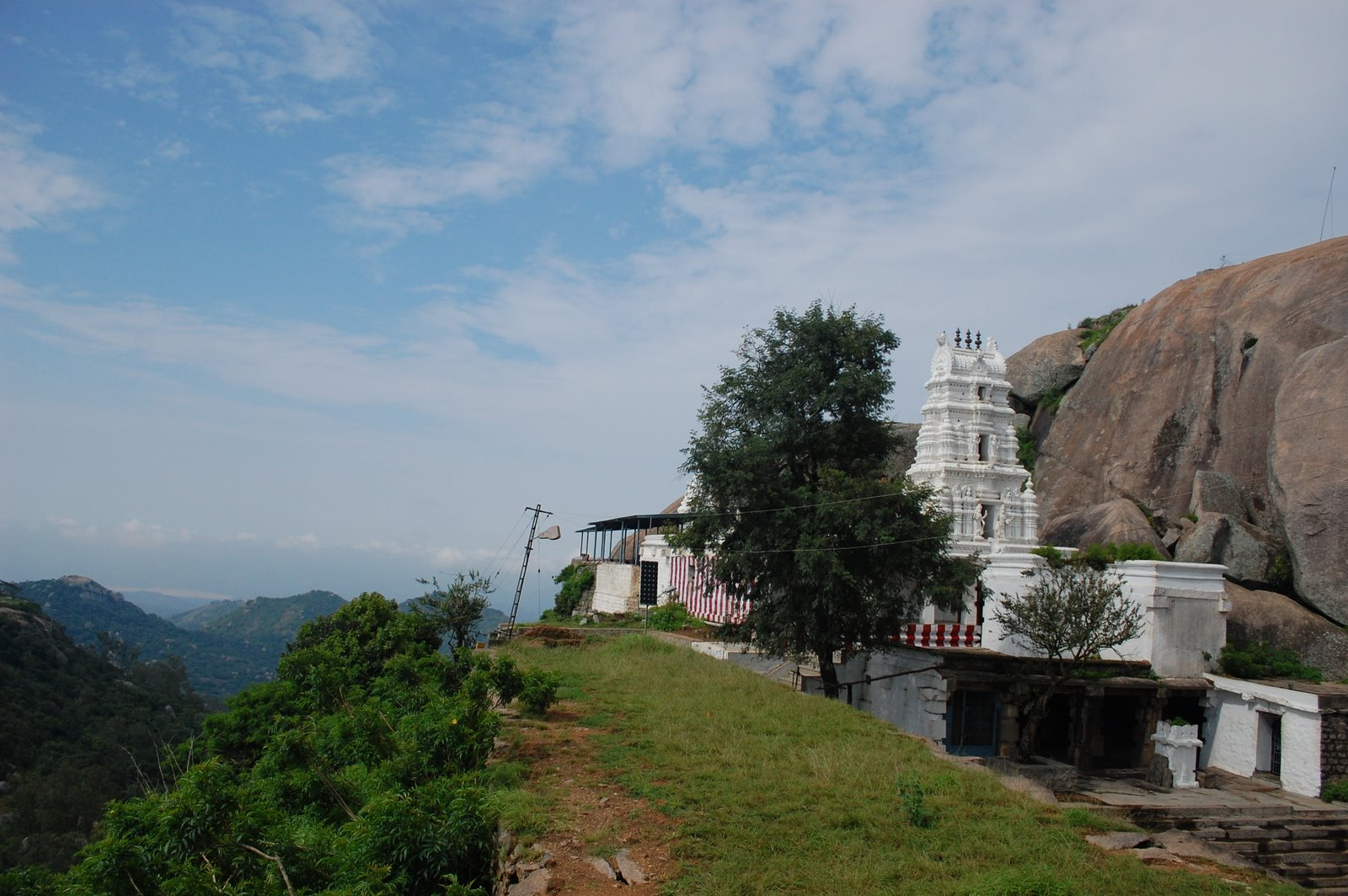
- Devarayanadurga
- Nickname: Devarayanadurga
- Location in Karnataka, India
- Coordinates: 13.375°N 77.213°E
- Country: India
- State: Karnataka
- District: Tumkuru

Government
  - Type: Gram
  - Body: Panchayat of Aregujjanahalli

Area
  - Total: 2.3 km^{2} (0.89 sq mi)
  - Rank: 69th:Tumakuru

Population (2011)
  - Total: 219
  - Rank: 174th:Tumakuru
  - Density: 95/km^{2} (250/sq mi)

Languages
  - Official: Kannada
- Time zone: UTC+5:30 (IST)
- PIN CODE: 572 146
- Telephone code: 0816
- ISO 3166 code: IN-KA
- Vehicle registration: KA-06
- Website: karnataka.gov.in

Devarayanadurga is a temple town and hill station located in the district of Tumakuru in the state of Karnataka in India. The rocky hills are surrounded by forest and the hilltops are dotted with several temples including the Yoganarasimha and the Bhoganarasimha temples.It has an altitude of 1204 metres.

Devarayanadurga translates to "Devaraya's fort" in Kannada; the town got its current name after the Mysore ruler Chikka Devaraja Wodeyar captured it in one of his victories. The place is thought by many to be haunted.

== Location ==
Devarayanadurga is located 15 kilometers (9 mi) from Tumakuru city and at an altitude of 3,940 feet, and about 73 kilometres (45 mi) from Bengaluru city, the capital of Karnataka.

== See also ==
Namada Chilume
