= Bayalu Seeme =

Region in Karnataka, India

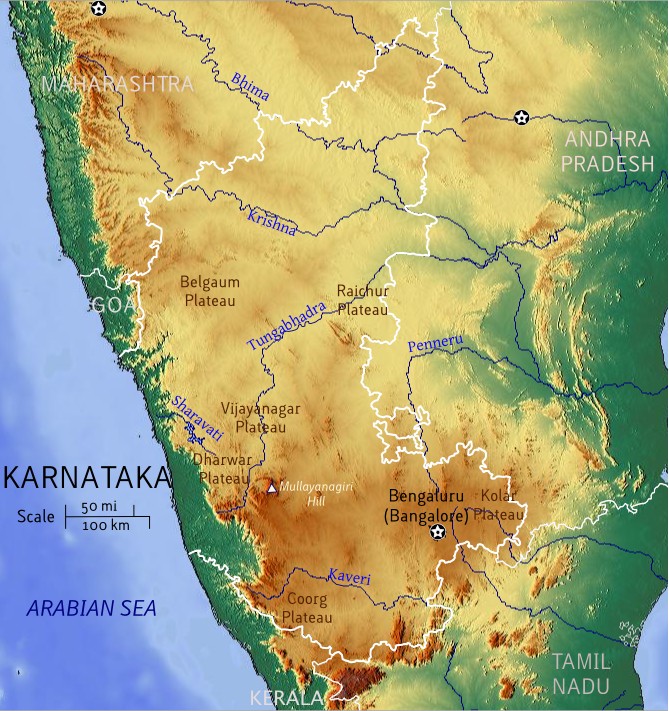
Bayalu Seeme comprises the plains of the southern Deccan Plateau in Karnataka

Bayaluseemé or Bayalu Seemé is the area lying to the east of Malenadu, a region of Karnataka state in India. The area is largely open plain, with few hillocks. It includes the districts of Bengaluru, Bengaluru Rural, Ramanagara, Bagalkot, Vijayapura, Chitradurga, Davanagere, Vijayanagara, Ballari, Kalaburagi, Dharwad, Koppal, Kolar, Gadag, Hassan, Bidar, Haveri, Belagavi, Mandya, Chikkaballapur, Chamarajanagar, Mysuru, Yadgir, Raichur and Tumakuru.

== Topography ==
Bayalu Seeme has a gently rolling surface, punctuated by several of the large rivers that rise in the Western Ghats and flow eastward to empty into the Bay of Bengal.

== Vegetation ==
Bayalu Seeme lies in the rain shadow of the Western Ghats, and is generally much drier than Coastal Karnataka (Karavali) and the Western Ghats. The region was originally covered by extensive, open-canopied Tropical dry deciduous forests, characterized by the trees Acacia, Albizia and Hardwickia. But much of the original forest has been cleared for agriculture, timber, grazing and firewood.

Overexploitation of the forests for fuelwood and fodder has resulted in much of the original forest being degraded into thickets and scrublands. Canthium parriflorum, Cassia auriculata, Dodonaea viscosa, Erythroxylum monogynum, Pterolobium hexapetalum and Euphorbia antiquorum are species typical of the thicket and scrubland vegetation.

== See also ==
- Bangalore Division
- Cauvery Wildlife Sanctuary
- Kaveri River
