= Koratagere =

- Town panchayat
- Location in Karnataka, India
- Coordinates: 13.52°N 77.23°E
- Country: India
- State: Karnataka
- District: Tumkur
- Elevation: 750 m (2,460 ft)

Population (2011)
  - Total: 15,265

Languages
  - Official: Kannada
- Time zone: UTC+5:30 (IST)
- ISO 3166 code: IN-KA
- Vehicle registration: KA64
- Website: karnataka.gov.in

Koratagere is a panchayat town and taluka in Tumkur district in the Indian state of Karnataka.

== Geography ==
Koratagere is a town in Koratagere Taluk in Tumkur District in Karnataka State. 13.52°N 77.23°E. It has an average elevation of 750 metres (2460 feet).

== Demographics ==
2011 India census, Koratagere had a population of15,265. Males constitute 51% of the population and females 49%. Koratagere has an average literacy rate of 71%, higher than the national average of 59.5%: male literacy is 77%, and female literacy is 65%. In Koratagere, 11% of the population is under 6 years of age.
