= Tumakuru district =

Tumakuru District
- District of Karnataka
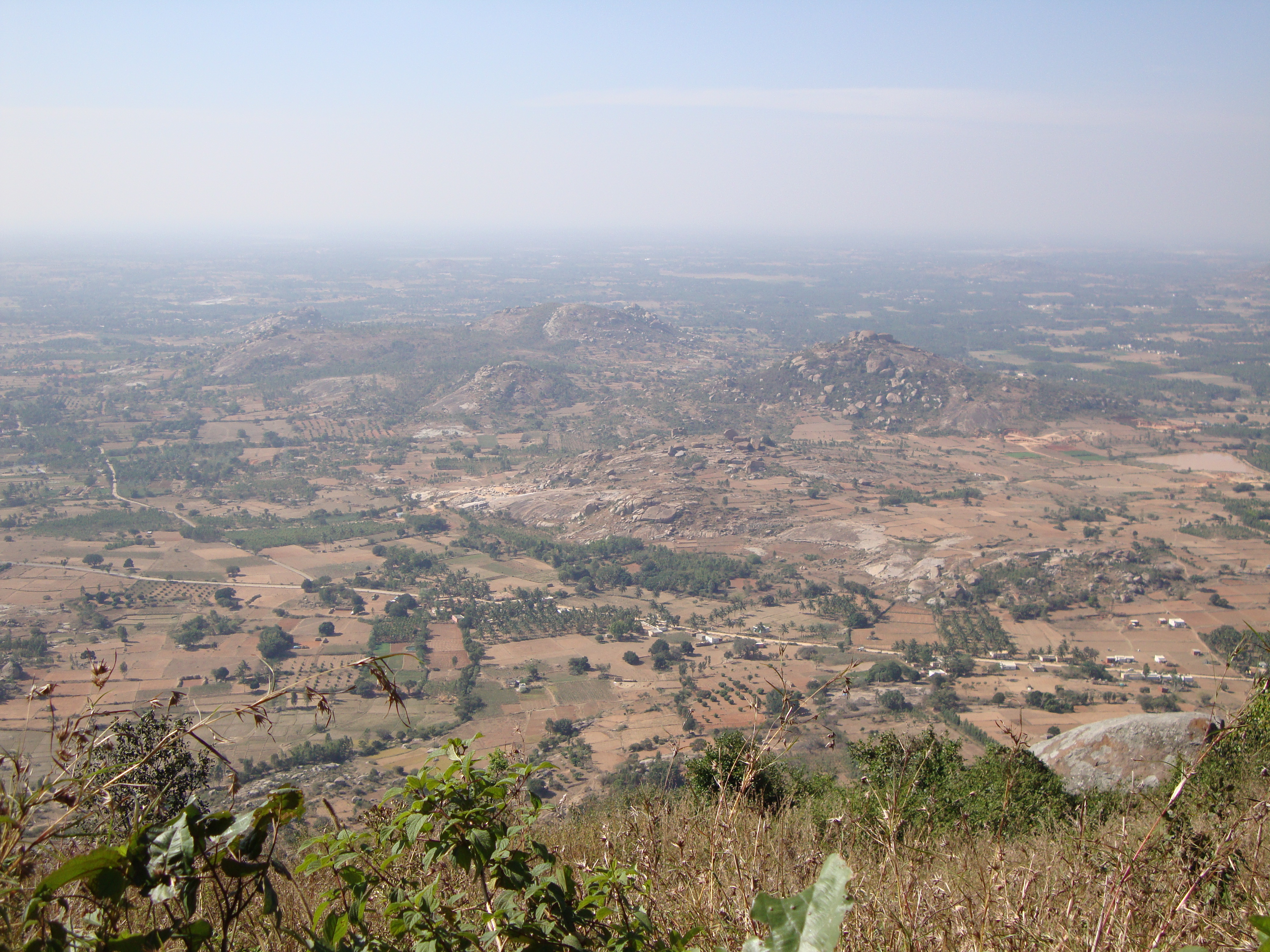
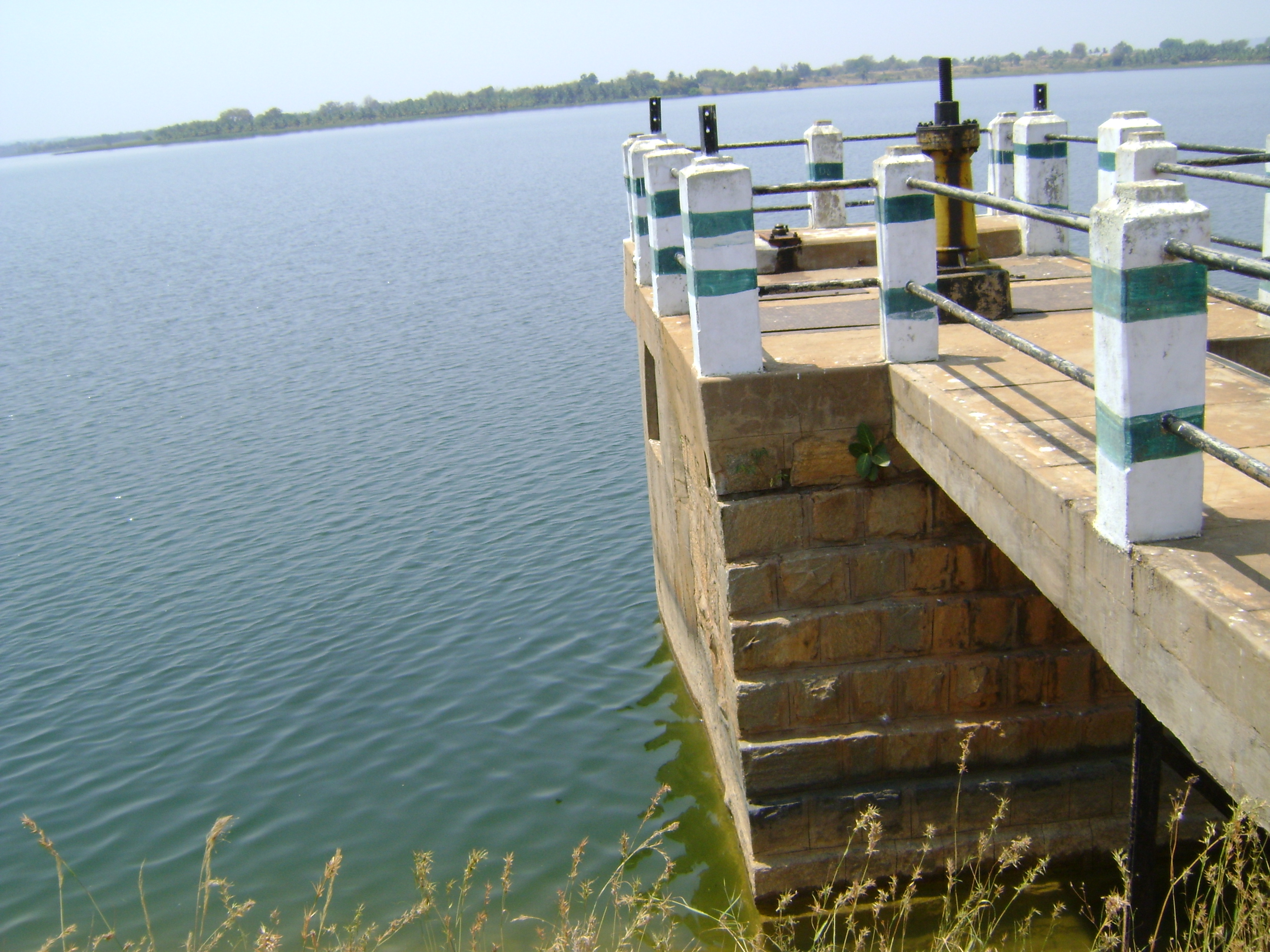
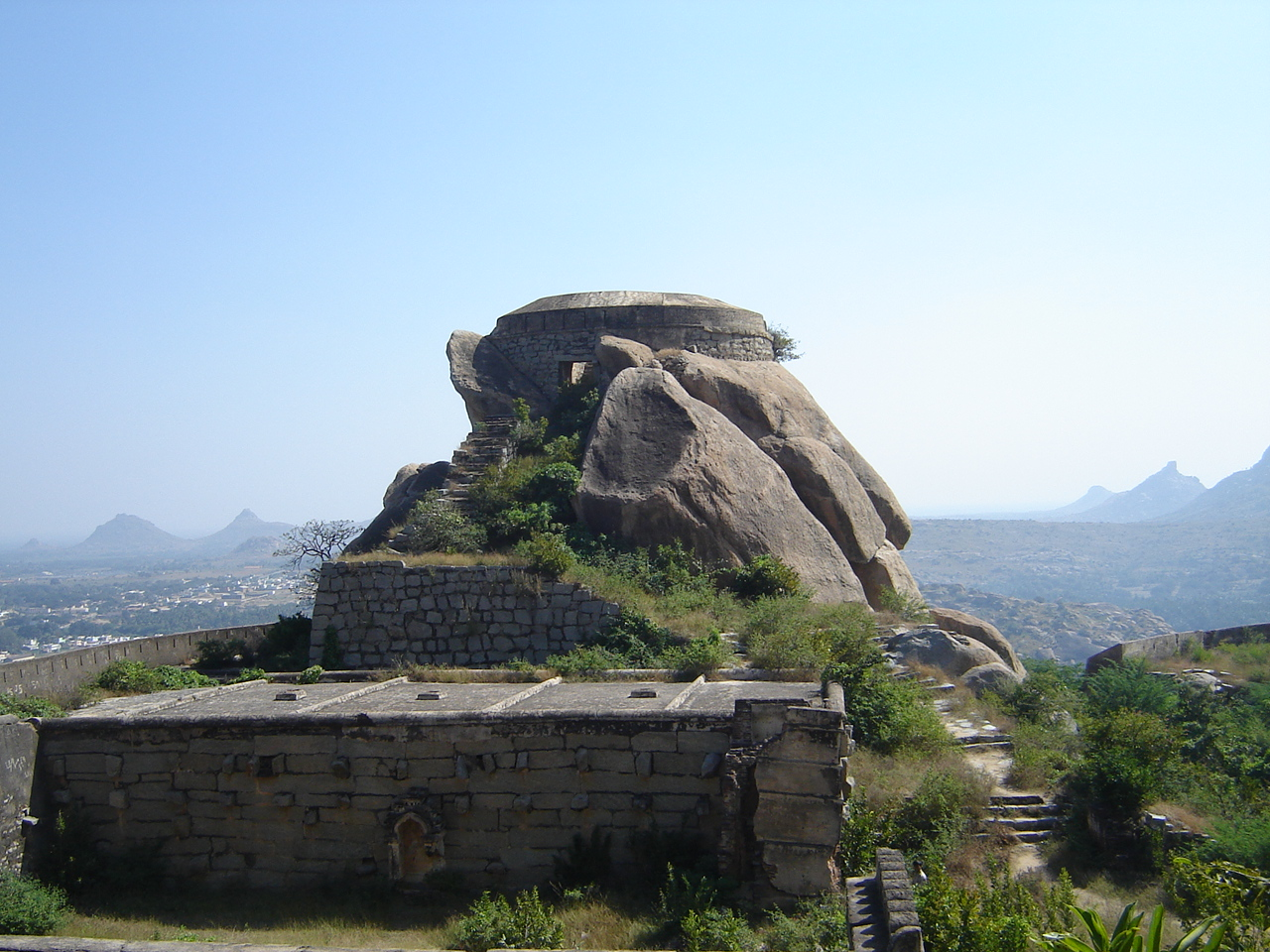
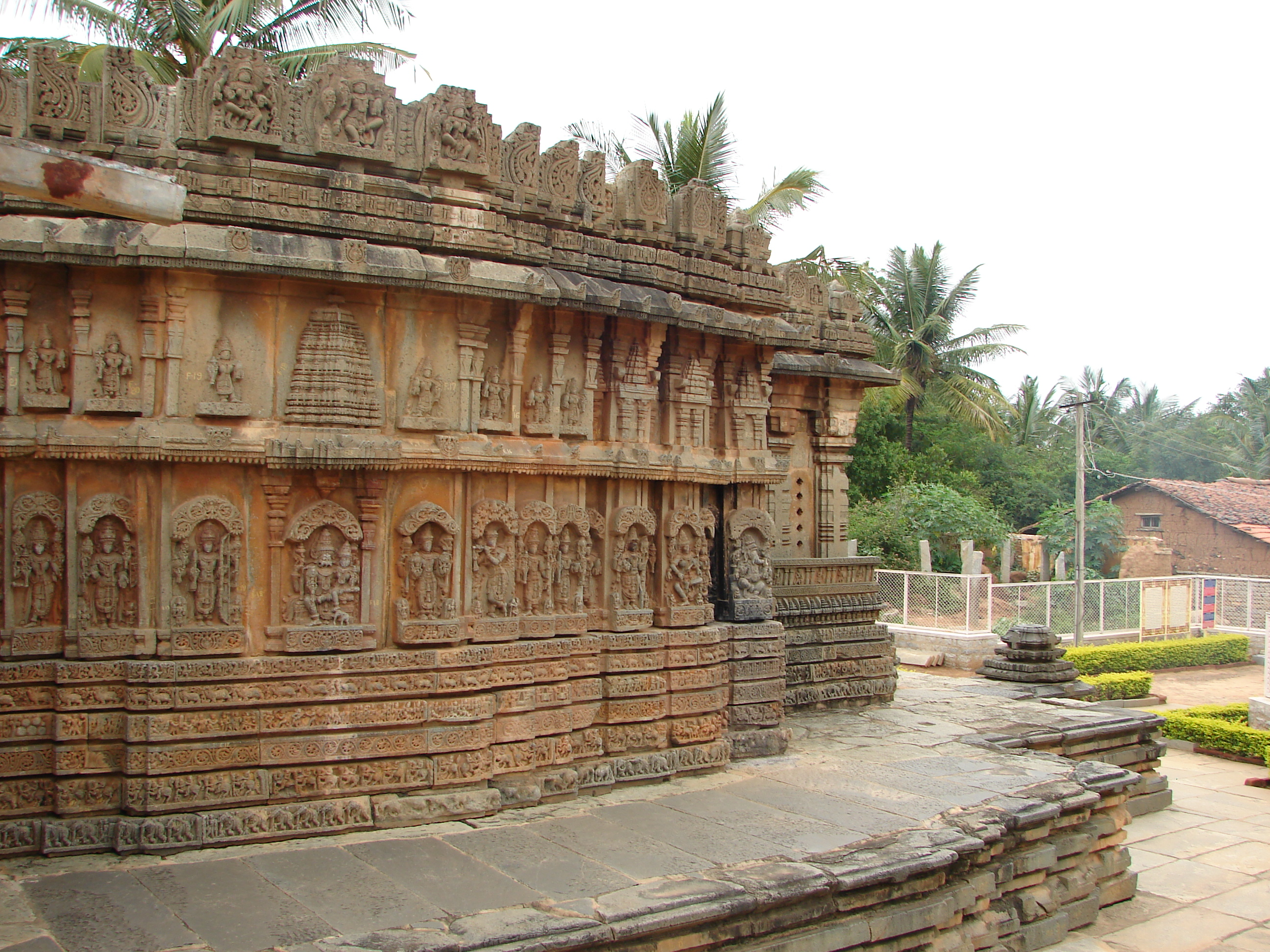
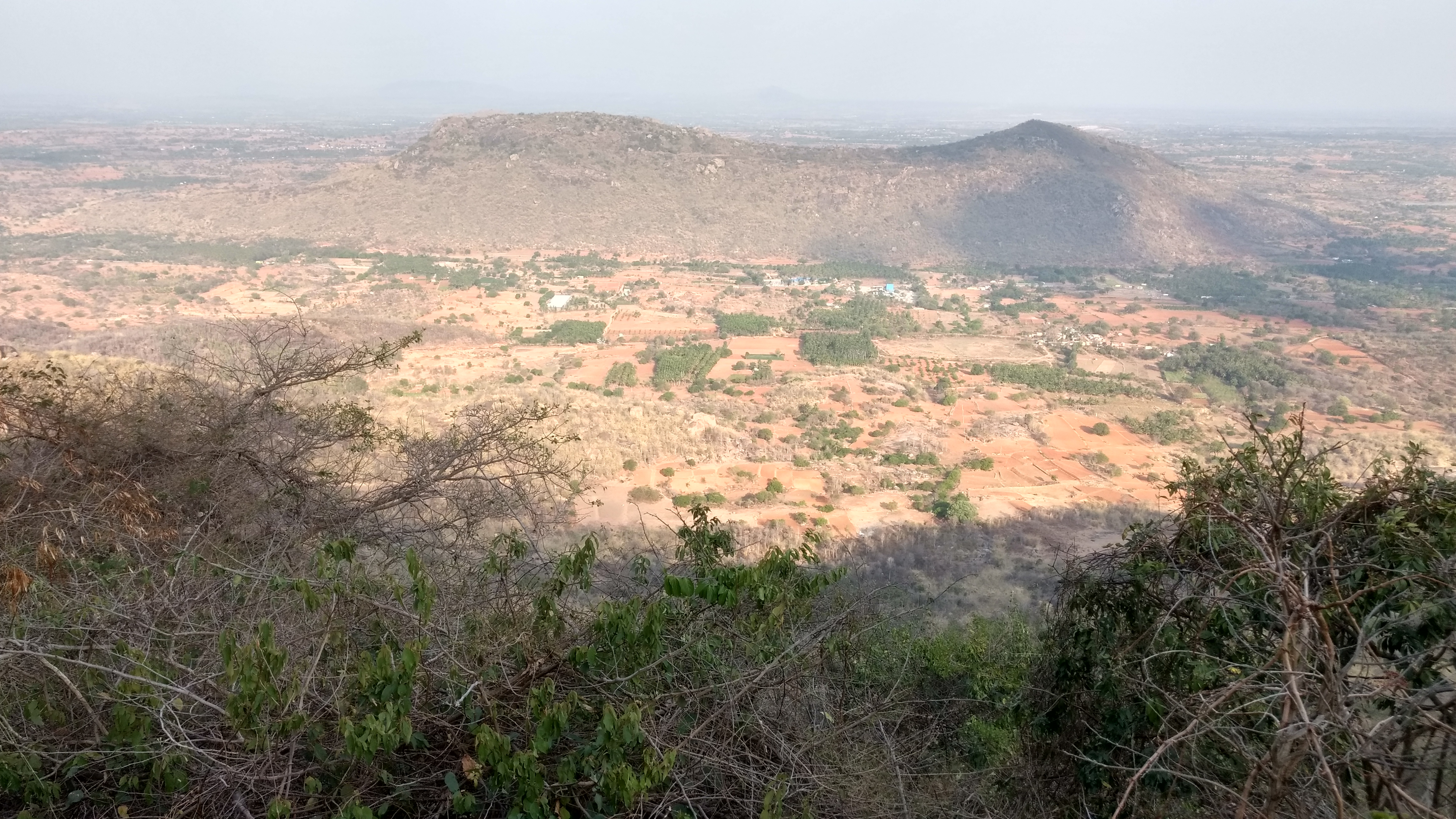
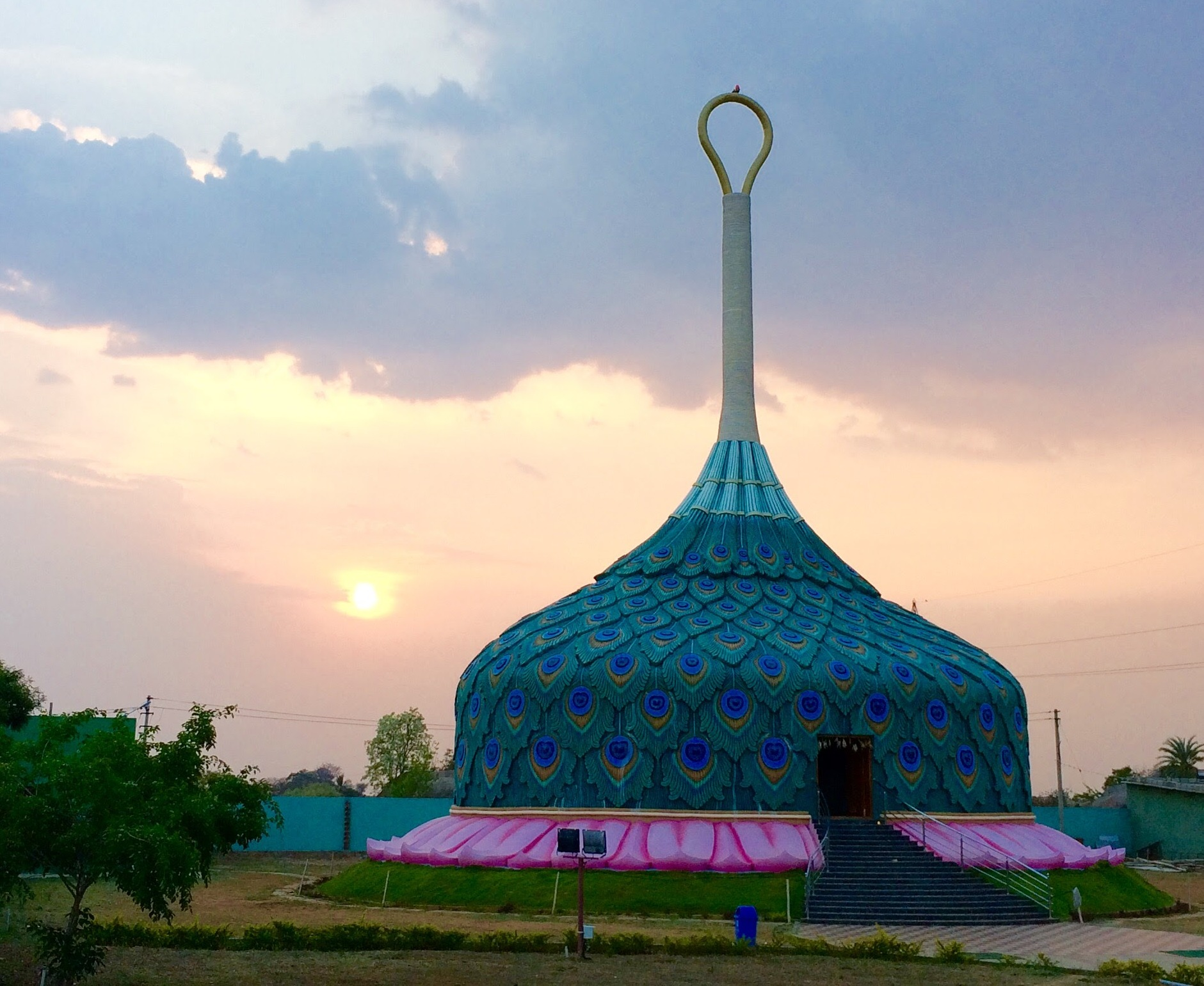
- Clockwise from top-left: View from Shivagange, Markonahalli Reservoir, Chennakeshava Temple at Arlaguppe, Guru Mandir, Mandaragiri, View from Devarayanadurga Hill, Madhugiri Fort
- Nicknames: Kalpataru Nadu (Coconut Country), Shikshanika Nagari (City of Educational Institutions)
- Location in Karnataka
- Coordinates: 13.34°N 77.1°E
- Country: India
- State: Karnataka
- Headquarters: Tumakuru
- Talukas: Tumakuru, Sira, Gubbi, Tipaturu, Turuvekere, Kunigal, Madhugiri, Pavagada, Koratagere, Chikkanayakanahalli.

Government
  - Deputy Commissioner and District Magistrate: Subha Kalyan, I.A.S
  - District In-charge Minister: G. Parameshwara (INC)
  - President, Zilla Panchayat: Latha Ravikumar (JDS)
  - Superintendent of police: Ashok K V, I.P.S

Area
  - Total: 10,597 km^{2} (4,092 sq mi)

Population (2011)
  - Total: 2,678,980
  - Rank: 150 in India
  - Density: 252.81/km^{2} (654.76/sq mi)

Languages
  - Official: Kannada
- Time zone: UTC+5:30 (IST)
- PIN: 572xxx
- Vehicle registration: Tumakuru KA 06; Tipaturu KA 44; Madhugiri KA 64
- Website: tumkur.nic.in

Tumakuru district is an administrative district in the state of Karnataka in India. It is the second largest district in Karnataka by land area with an area of 10,598 km^{2}, and fourth largest by Population. It is a one-and-a-half-hour drive from Bengaluru, the state capital. The district is known for the production of coconuts and is also called as 'Kalpataru Nadu'. It is the only discontiguous district in Karnataka (Pavagada Taluk has no geographical continuity with the rest of the district).

As of census of 2011, the district has a population of 2,678,980, with a population density of 253 people /km^{2}, the district has the literary rate of 75.14% and a sex ratio of 984 women/ 1000 men. Tumakuru district is surrounded by Chikkaballapura district and Bengaluru Rural in East, Ramanagara district in South-East, Mandya and Hassan districts in South-West, Chikmagalur district in west, Chitradurga district in north-west and Sri Sathya Sai district and Anantapur district of Andhra Pradesh in North.

== Transport ==
Tumkur provides connectivity to Banglore, Hassan, Chitradurga and Many more cities. The RTO Code of Tumkur is KA06

== History ==
Nidugal Cholas were ruled this region between 8th to 13th century.

The district was formed in 1832 during the days of British commissioner of Mysuru Sir Mark Cubbon as Chitaldroog Division including the area of present Chitradurga and Tumakuru districts headquartered at Tumakuru. Major General Richard Stewart Dobbs was the first collector of the district (term of office 1835–1861), who was key responsible for the establishment of Munro system of administration. In the year 1862 Chitaldroog division was abolished and Tumakuru (Nandidroog division) and Chitradurga (Nagar Division) established as separate districts by Lewin Bentham Bowring. The district occupies an area of 10,598 km^{2} and had a population of 2,678,980, of which 19.62% were urban as of 2011. The district is known for the production of coconuts, called as 'Kalpataru Nadu'. It is the only discontiguous district in Karnataka (Pavagada Taluk has no geographical continuity with the rest of the district).

== Geography ==
Tumakuru district has ten talukas, eleven Assembly constituencies and the district is shared among three Parliamentary constituencies. Tumakuru district shares border with ten districts, which is the highest in the state. The districts that share the border are Districts of Chitradurga towards north, Hassan and Chikkamagaluru towards west, Mandya towards south-west, Ramanagara and Bengaluru Rural towards south, Chikkaballapura towards east and Sri Sathya Sai district and Anantapur district (Andhra Pradesh) towards north-east.

It consists chiefly of elevated land intersected by river valleys. A range of hills rising to nearly 4,000 feet (1,200 m) crosses it from north to south, forming the watershed between the systems of the Krishna and the Kaveri. The principal streams are the Jayamangali and the Shimsha. The mineral wealth of Tumakuru is considerable; iron is obtained in large quantities from the hillsides; and excellent building-stone is quarried. The slopes of the Devarayanadurga hills are clothed with forests. Wildlife such as leopards, dhole, bears and wild boar have been recorded here. Although, tigers have been recorded from these forests as late as the 1950s, most recent reports are of stray sightings and need confirmation. The annual rainfall averages 39 inches.

== Demographics ==
Historical population
Year	Pop.	±% p.a.
1901	671,801	—
1911	738,786	+0.95%
1921	776,825	+0.50%
1931	863,227	+1.06%
1941	955,809	+1.02%
1951	1,151,362	+1.88%
1961	1,367,402	+1.73%
1971	1,627,721	+1.76%
1981	1,977,854	+1.97%
1991	2,305,819	+1.55%
2001	2,584,711	+1.15%
2011	2,678,980	+0.36%

Religion in Tumakuru district (2011)
Religion	Percent
Hinduism	90.10%
Islam	9.18%
Other or not stated	0.72%

According to the 2011 census Tumakuru district has a population of 2,678,980, roughly equal to the nation of Kuwait or the US state of Nevada. The district ranked 4th place in terms of population in Karnataka after Bengaluru, Belagavi and Mysuru. The district has a population density of 253 per square km. Its population growth rate over the decade 2001–2011 was 3.74%. Tumkur has a sex ratio of 984 females for every 1000 males, and a literacy rate of 75.14%. 22.36% of the population lives in urban areas. Scheduled Castes and Scheduled Tribes make up 18.92% and 7.82% of the population respectively.

=== Language ===
Languages of Tumakuru district (2011)
1. Kannada (85.0%)
2. Urdu (9.03%)
3. Telugu (3.38%)
4. Lambadi (1.07%)
5. Others (1.57%)

At the time of the 2011 census, 84.95% of the population spoke Kannada, 9.03% Urdu, 3.38% Telugu and 1.07% Lambadi, 1.57% other languages as their first language.

== Description ==
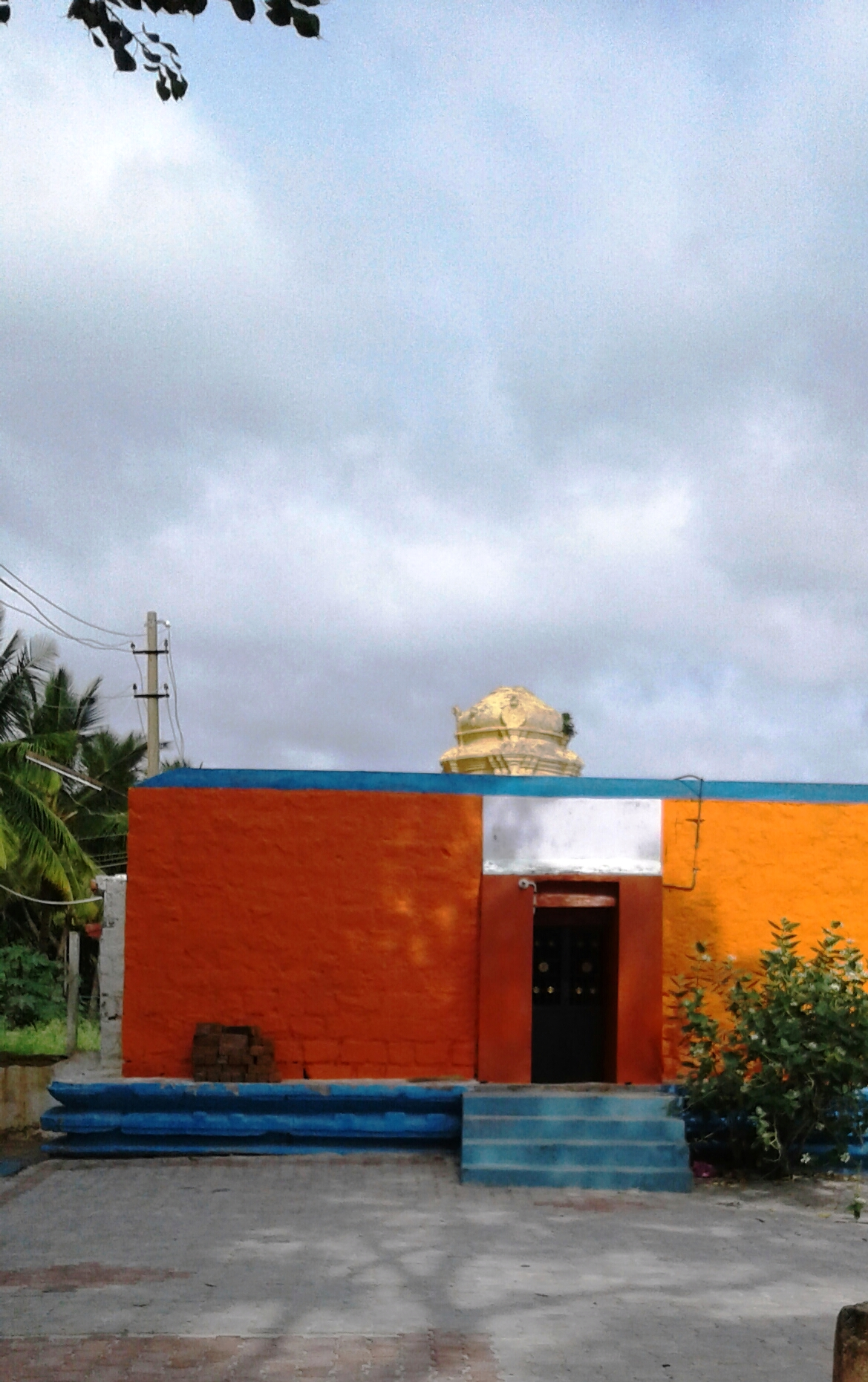
Kunigal Temple

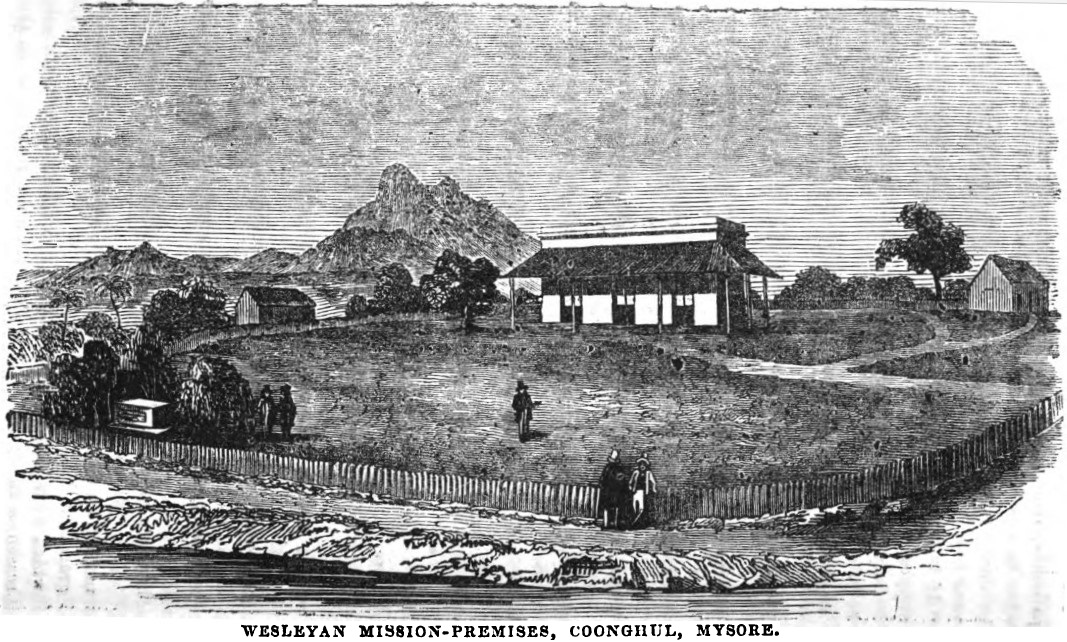
Tumkur in History

The known history of Tumakuru district begins with the Gangas. The Ganga family ruled over the southern and eastern districts of the State from early in the Christian era to 1025 A.D. The earliest record of the Ganga family found in this district belongs to about 400 A.D. After the Gangas, Tumkur was ruled by the Rastrakutas and the Chalukyas. The Nolambas under these rulers ruled the area for a long time. The Cholas also ruled some parts of the district. The Vijayanagara Empire ruled supreme for the later part of the 13th to 17th century. During the 18th and 19th century, Tumkur was ruled by the Wodeyars of Mysore until Independence.

The Tumakuru Town Municipality was set up by the British and Mysore Wodeyars in the 1916. Self-rule of the residents started after the setting up of the municipality. It was converted into a City Corporation only in 2010 by adding 22 villages adjoining the city. The population is 305,877 as per the 2011 census.

== Economy ==
Tumakuru is now a middle class majority city, with a literacy rate of 80%, mainly traders, government employees, small and medium industrialists, self-employed individuals etc. The GDP of Tumkur is around 6045184 Rs lakh (2019–20) and the total collection of income tax in the last financial year was approximately 800 million. The aspirational level of the citizens is very high. Being an agrarian economy, the major plantation crops of Tumkur are coconuts and areca nuts. The major cash crops are paddy, ragi and groundnuts. Iron ore, manganese and granite are the major minerals found in Tumkur district.

Owing to its proximity to Bangalore, besides being the gateway to Karnataka, being on the Chennai – Mumbai Industrial Corridor and the infrastructure that Tumkur provides, Tumkur has the potential to be the satellite city to decongest the State Capital of Bangalore. And also has been identified as National Investment and Manufacturing Zone (NIMZ). NIMZ of approx. 13500 acres and the HAL Helicopter manufacturing facility (Nr Gubbi) 610 acres will be developed as integrated industrial townships with state-of-the art infrastructure and land use on the basis of zoning; clean and energy efficient technology; necessary social infrastructure; skill development facilities, etc., for promoting world class manufacturing activity. Tumkur is home to 24 large scale industries with an investment of 9114.2 million and generating an employment for 6445 persons. The existing 15 medium scale industries and 23804 micro and small Industries employ 132994 persons and account for an investment of close to 7.90 billion. Also 2000 MW of Solar power plant on 11000 acres in Pavagada to cater to the power needs of Tumkur and adjoining districts.

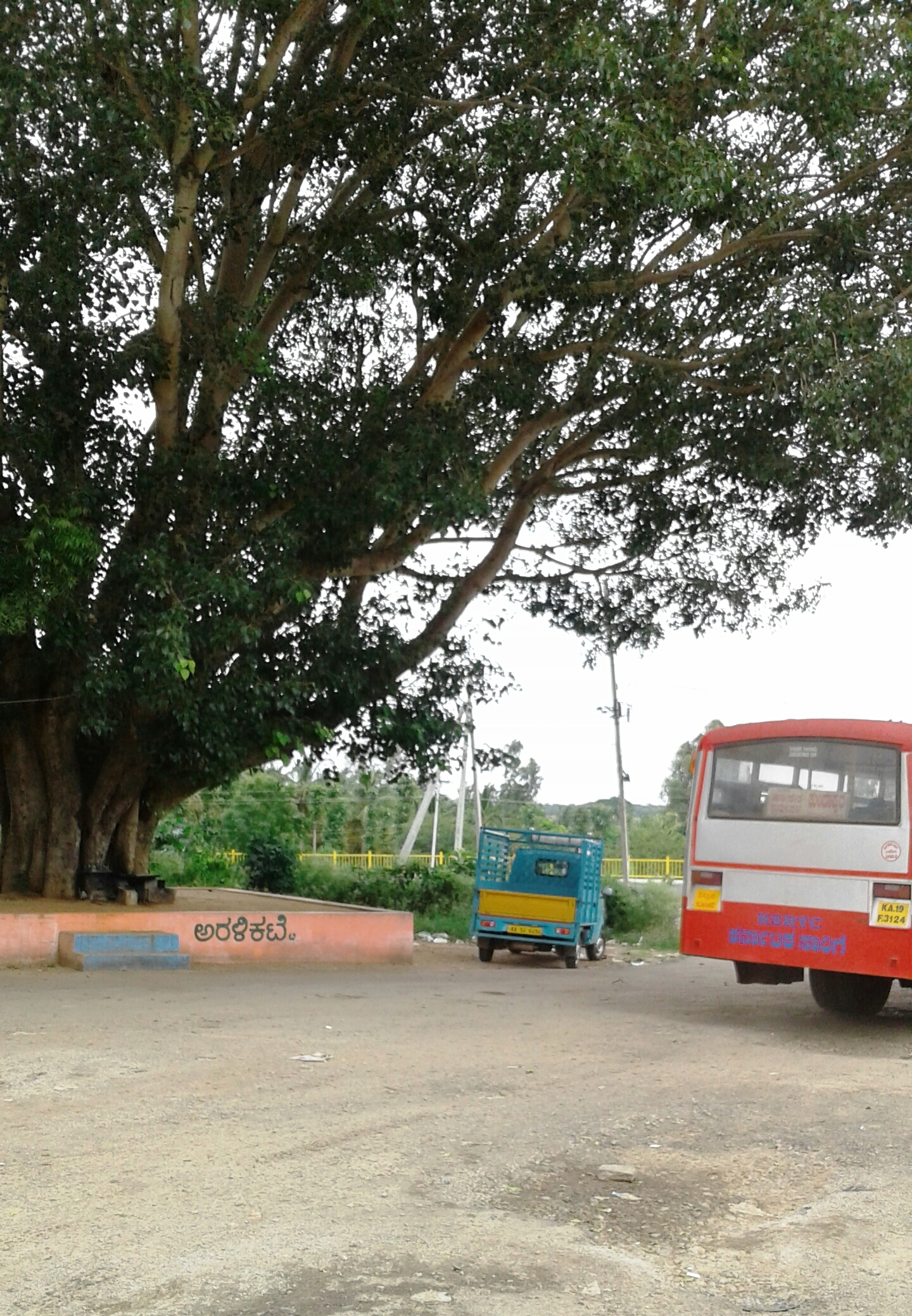
Siddapura, Yadiyur

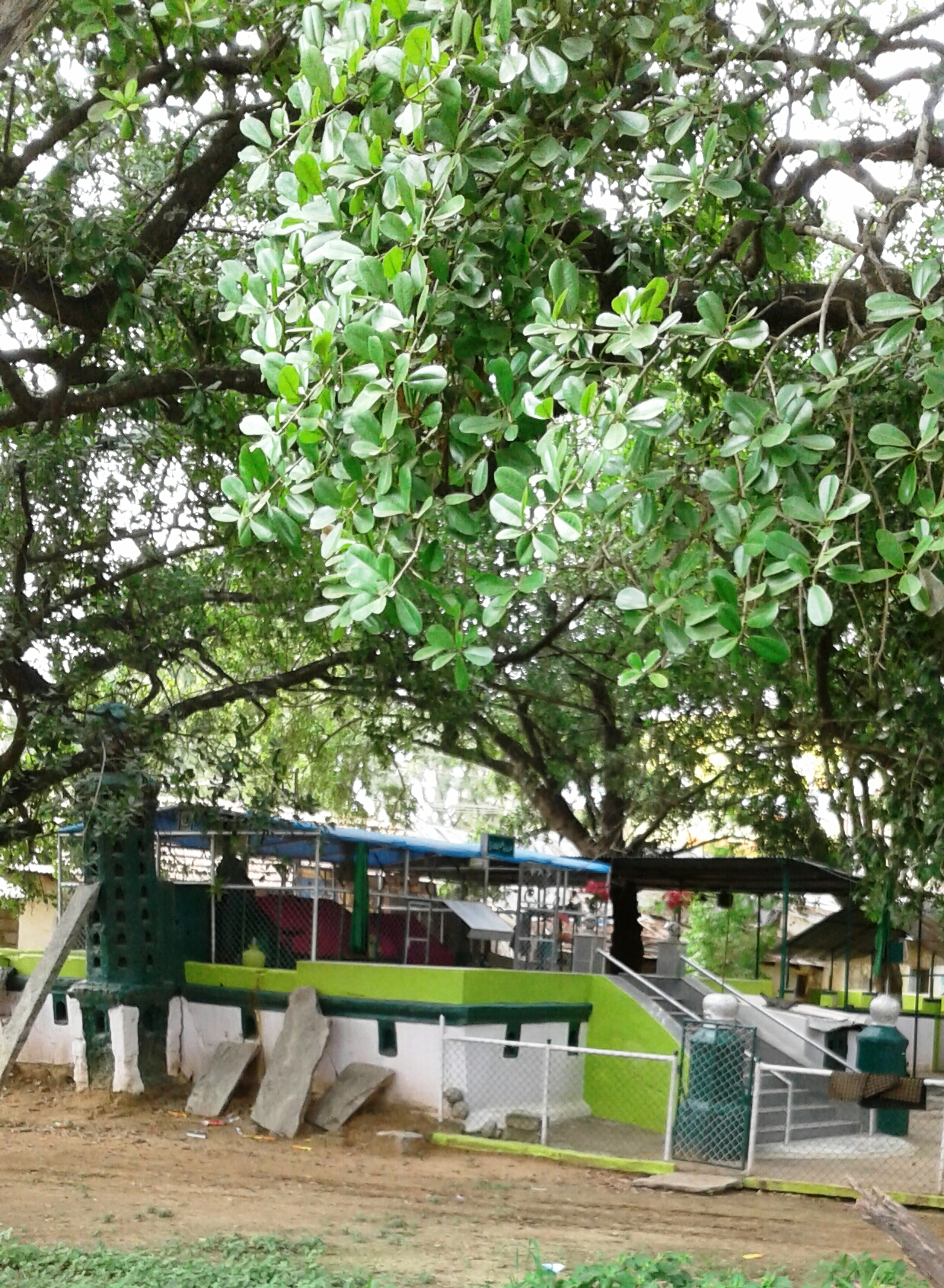
Bangalore-Hassan Road

Tumkur is a knowledge hub in the south interior Karnataka and boasts of its own Tumkur University, two medical colleges, five engineering colleges, 38-degree and post-graduate colleges, one dental college and many polytechnics, high schools and primary schools imparting top-level education to all classes of citizens.

The Indian budget for 2014–15 held on 10 July 2014 had announced that Tumkur is one of the cities in south India to be developed as an "Industrial Smart" city. The city was selected as one among the 100 in the country shortlisted for the Smart City project. Tumkur is competing now to be one among the 20 to be taken up for development. The government of India has promised 1 billion each as a matching grant for five years and the local Body with assistance from the state government has to match another 1 billion. Thus, in five years development to the tune of 10 billion will happen in Smart City. The Tumkur District Chamber of Commerce and Industry under the leadership of Surendra Shah, President 2014–16 is striving for the district to be developed as a "Knowledge Industry New Destination city" (KIND).

== Taluks ==
- Chikkanayakanahalli
- Gubbi
- Koratagere
- Kunigal
- Madhugiri
- Pavagada
- Sira
- Tiptur
- Tumakuru
- Turuvekere

== Education ==
It has educational institutions from primary to higher education. It has its own university. Within this town, there are seven technology institutions, two medical institutions and one dental institution.

The district is divided as two Educational district. i.e. Tumakuru (south) and other one is Tumakuru (north) Madhugiri Educational district. Where as Tumakuru (south) includes 6 taluks as Chikkanayakanahalli, Gubbi, Kunigal, Tiptur, Tumakuru and Turuvekere.And Tumkur (north) Madhugiri district includes 4 taluks namely koratagere, Madhugiri, Pavagada and Sira.Tumkur(south) considered as education hub nowadays.

It consists 2085 Govt.Primary schools, 63 aided Primary schools, 267 unaided Primary schools and 1 kendriya vidyalaya, and total 2,417 primary schools, there are 147 Govt. High schools, 205 aided High schools, 123 unaided High schools, and 2 central govt. High schools in the Tumkur south dist.Tumkur north dist, there are 1291 Govt. primary, 9 aided Primary schools, 123 unaided Primary schools exists.Vice versa there are 113 Govt. high schools, 109 aided High schools, 57 unaided high schools facility available.

=== Educational institutions in Tumakuru ===
- Sri Udaya Bharathi Educational and Charitable Institutions
- Akshaya Group of Educational Institutions
- Aryabharathi group of Educational Institutions
- Channabasaveshwara Group of Educational Institutions
- HMS Group of Educational Institutions
- Jain Group of Institutions
- Kalpataru Group of Educational Institutions
- Maruthi Group of Educational Institutions
- Sacred Heart Group of Educational Institutions
- Sarvodaya Group of Educational Institutions
- Shridevi Group of Educational Institutions
- Siddaganga Group of Educational Institutions
- Sri Siddharatha Group of Educational Institutions
- Sri Vidyodaya Foundation Trust
- St.Joseph's Group of Educational Institutions
- Varadaraja Group of Institutions
- Vidya Group of Educational Institutions (managed by AspireTechno)
- Vidyanikethan Group of Institutions
- Vidyanidhi Group of Institutions
- Vidyavahini Group of Educational Institutions
- Global Educational And Charitable Trust- Global Shaheen College
- Seshadripuram Pre-University College

== Image gallery ==
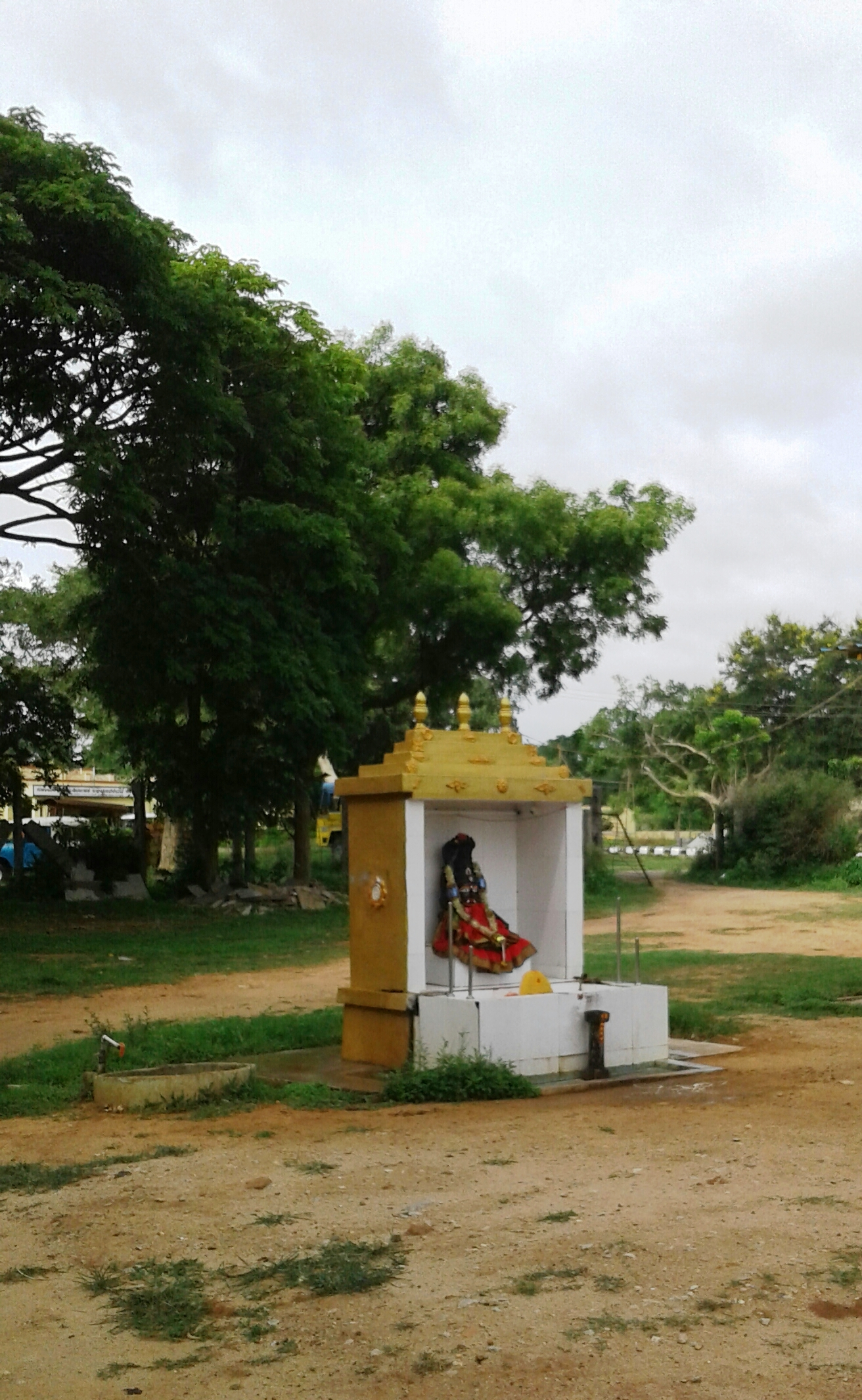
Kunigal Temple

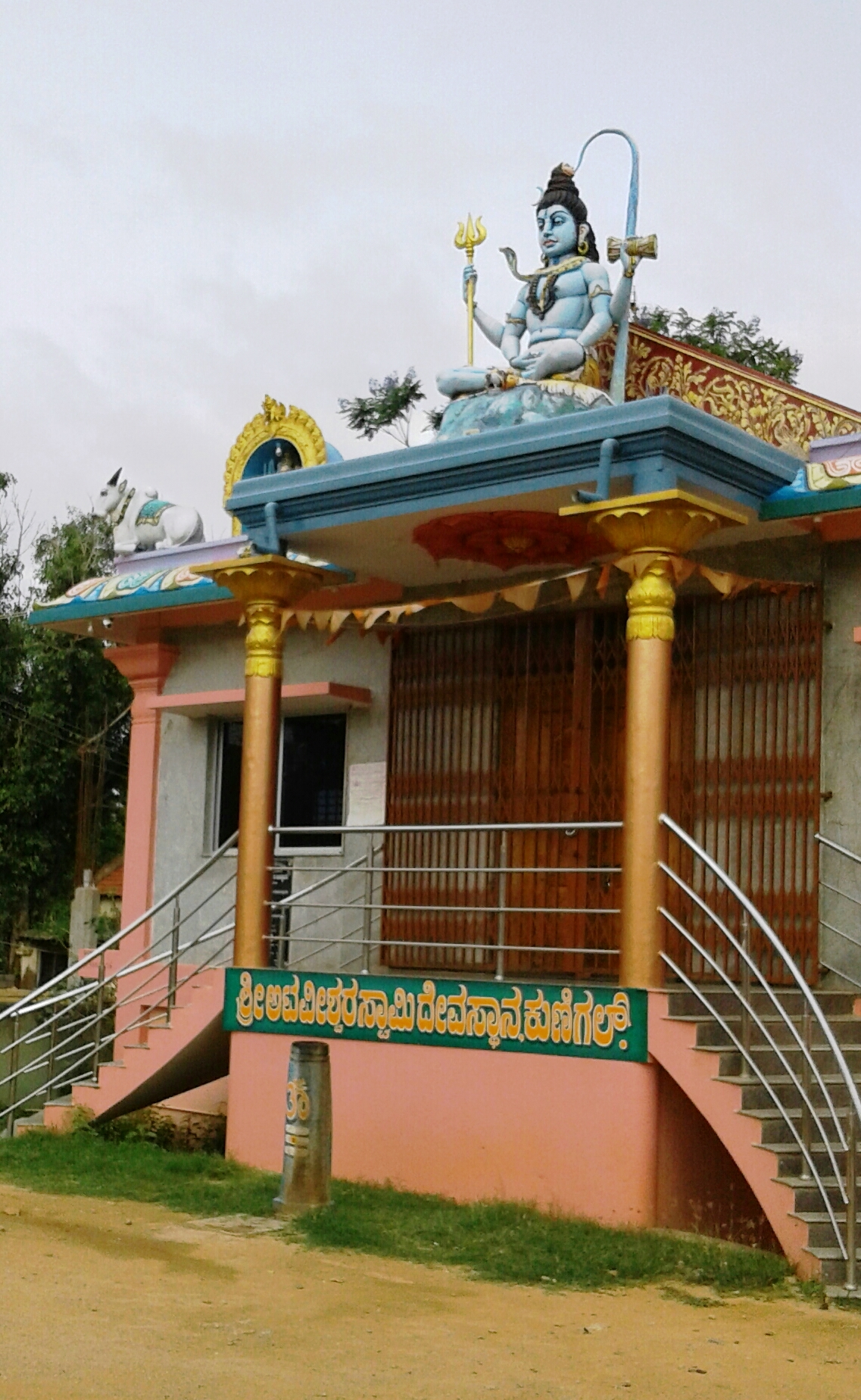
Shiva temple

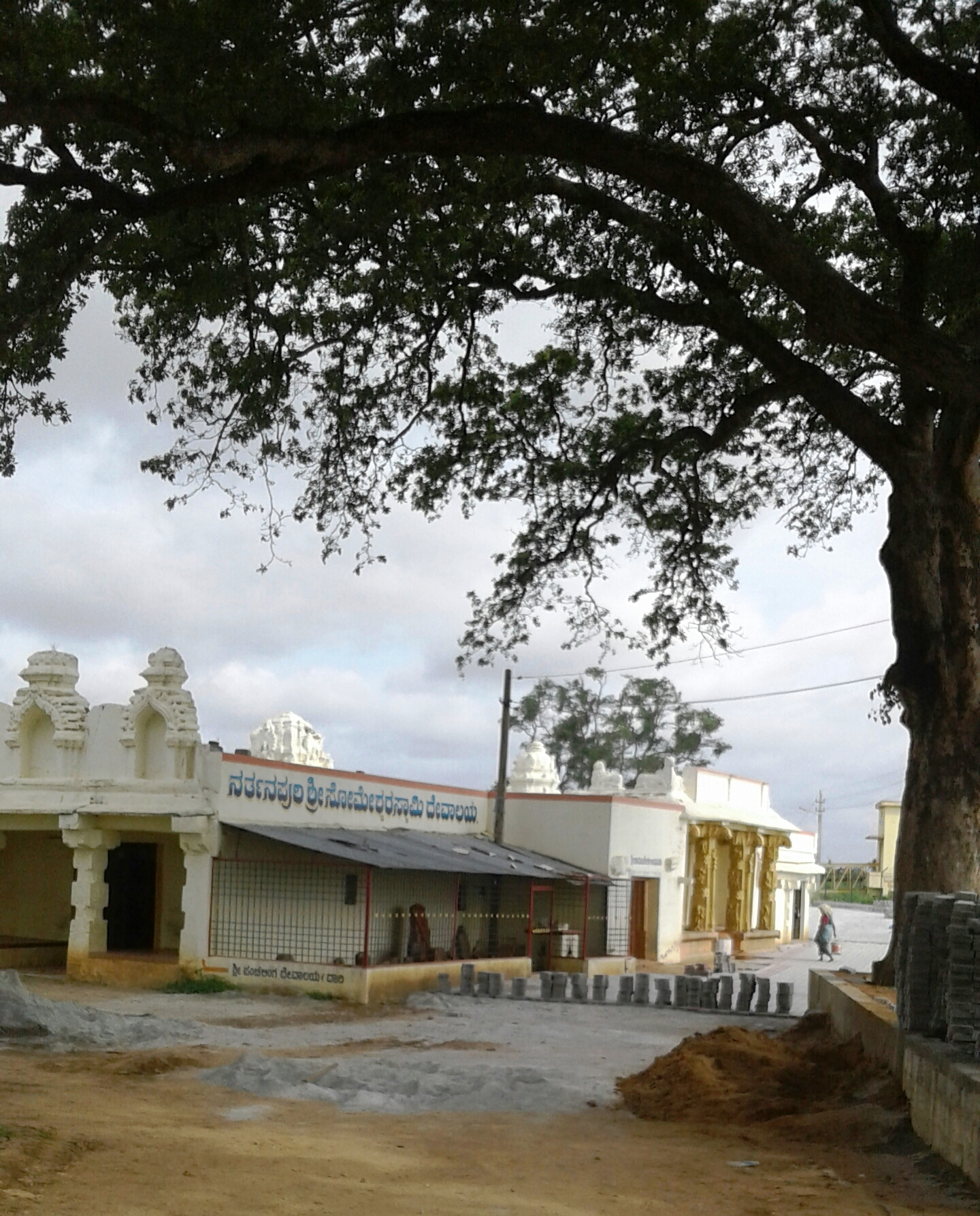
Kunigal promenade

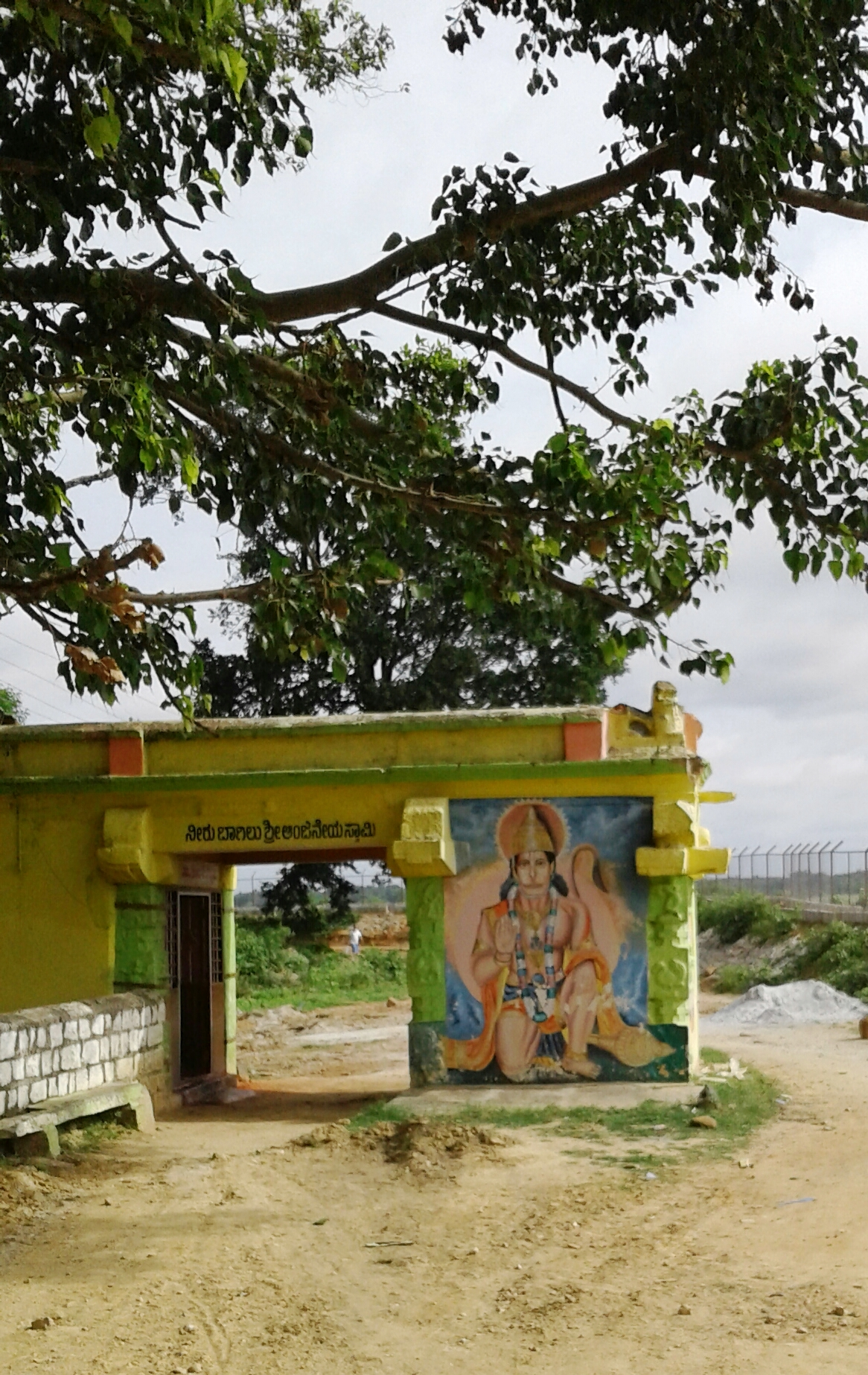
Kunigal Lake

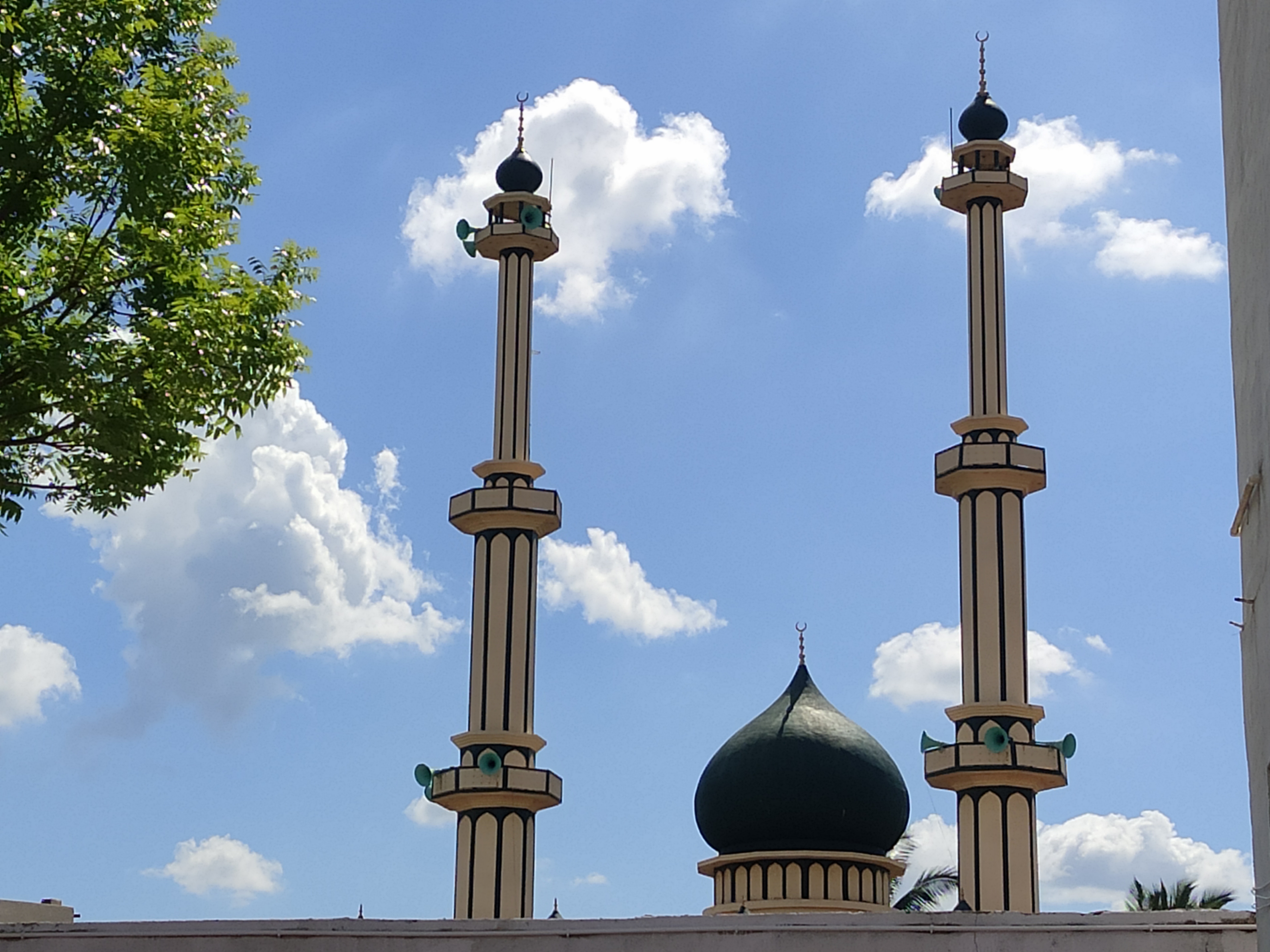
Masjid Al Rayyan, Ring Road Tumkur City

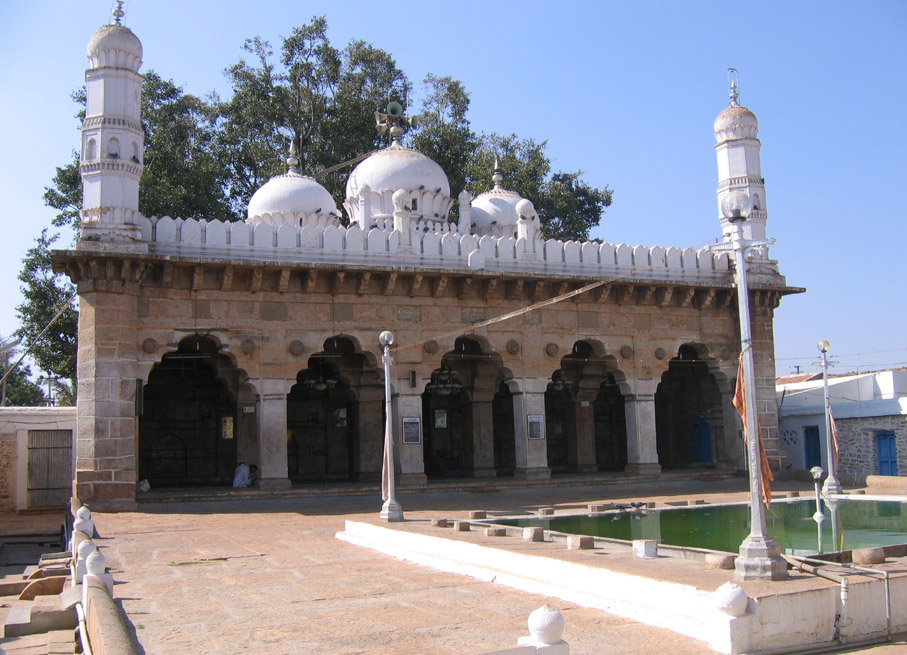
Jamia Masjid Sira

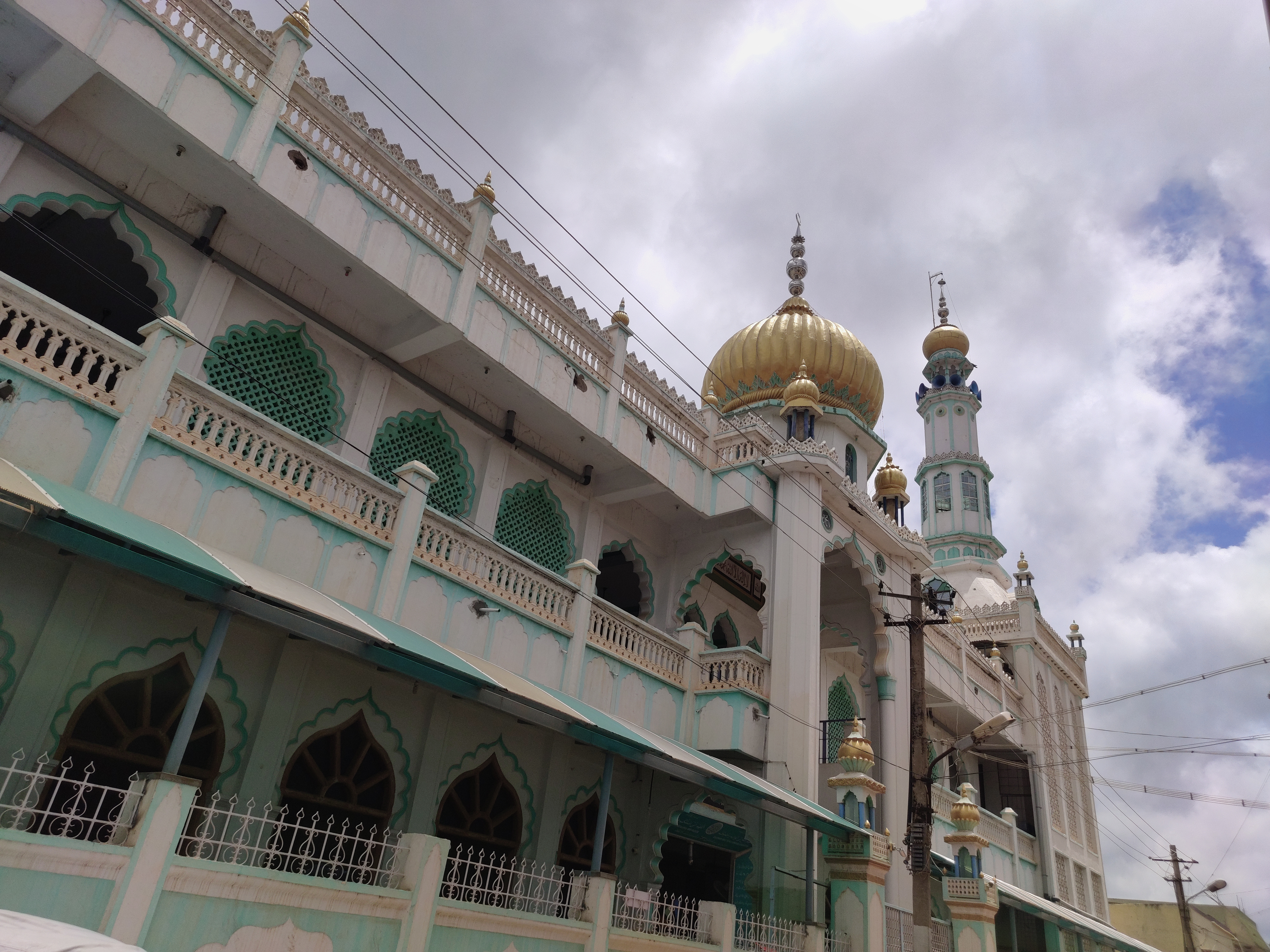
Masjid e Aqsa, Tumkur City

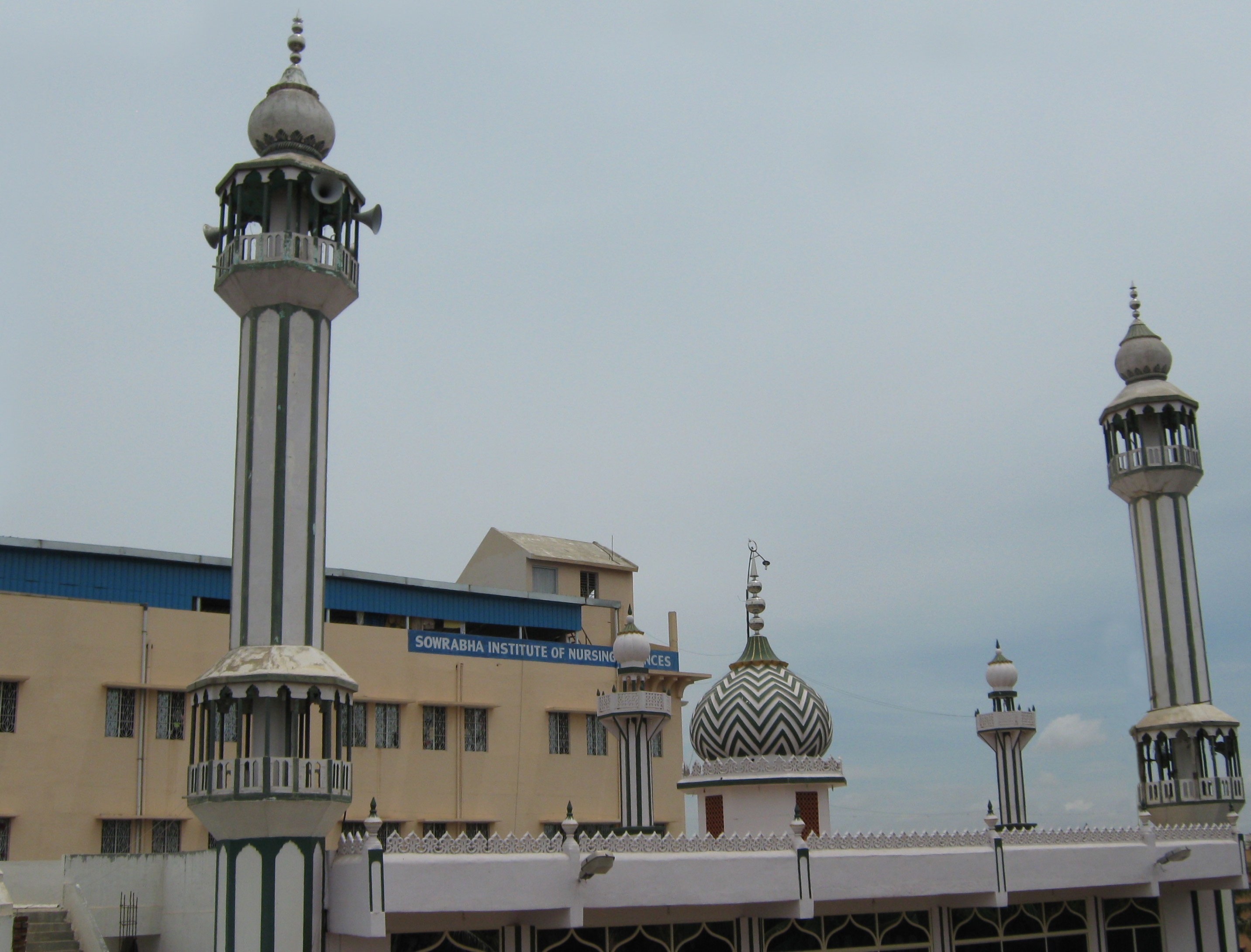
Makka Masjid, Barlane Tumkur City

== Top Tourist spots ==
- Mandaragiri
- Siddaganga Matha
- Devarayanadurga
- Namada Chilume
- Shimsha Markonahalli Dam
- Madhugiri - Monolithic Hill, Fort
- Pavagada Solar Park
- Kunigal Stud Farm
- Yedeyur
- Goravanahalli Mahalakshmi Temple
- Kasturi Rangappa Nayaka Fort
- Kaidala Sree channakeshava temple
- Nijagal Fort
- Jayamangali Blackbuck Conservation Reserve
- Siddara betta
- Huliyurdurga
- Borana kanive dam, Chikkanayakanahalli
- Hutridurga, Kunigal

== Notable people ==
=== Social service ===
- Sree Sree Shivakumara Swamiji

=== Actors ===
- Achyuth Kumar, actor
- Arjun Sarja, actor
- Ashika Ranganath, actress
- Jaggesh, actor
- Komal Kumar, actor and comedian
- Lohithaswa T.S actor, writer
- Manjula, actress
- Narasimharaju, Indian theatre and film actor
- Pavan Wadeyar, Kannada movie Director
- Rangayana Raghu, Actor and Comedian
- Tabla Nani, actor and Comedian
- Sharath Lohithaswa, actor
- Siddhanth, actor
- Sudha Rani, actress
- Suman Ranganath, actress
- Umang Jain, actress
- Umashree, actress

=== Arts ===
- Gubbi Veeranna, theater director
- T. Sunandamma, writer and humorist
- Renuka Kesaramadu, painter and sculptor
- Amarashilpi Jakanachari, sculptor
- Baraguru Ramachandrappa, film director and writer
- Chandrika Gururaj, playback singer

=== Writers ===
- K. B. Siddaiah, professor, poet, and social activist

=== Athletes ===
- Poll Shyamsunder, cricketer
- Poll Ashokanand, cricketer

=== Politicians ===
- G. Parameshwara, former Deputy Chief Minister of Karnataka
- T. B. Jayachandra, former Law Minister of Karnataka
- G. S. Basavaraj, Indian politician
- S. Mallikarjunaiah, Indian politician
- K. Lakkappa, Indian politician

=== Others ===
- C. P. Sadashivaiah, agriculture scientist
- Raja Ramanna, physicist
- M. S. Ramaiah, founder of MSR group of institutions

== Towns and villages ==
- Amruthur
- Bajagur
- Hagalavadi
- Kenkere
- Kottanahalli
- Mallasandra
- Marconahalli
- Shravandanahalli
- Yalachigere

== See also ==
- Tumkur Lok Sabha constituency
- Tumkur Rural Assembly constituency
