= B. Suresh Gowda =

Indian politician from Tumkur Rural Constituency

Member of Karnataka Legislative Assembly
- Incumbent
- Assumed office 13 May 2023
- Preceded by: D. C. Gowrishankar
- Constituency: Tumkur Rural
- In office 17 May 2008 – 23 May 2018
- Succeeded by: D. C. Gowrishankar
- Constituency: Tumkur Rural

Personal details
- Born: 15 May 1965 (age 61) Hutridurga, Kunigal, Karnataka, India
- Party: Bharatiya Janata Party
- Education: RC College Bengaluru
- Occupation: Politician

B. Suresh Gowda (born 15 May 1965) is an Indian politician from Karnataka. He won the 2023 Karnataka Legislative Assembly election and became a Member of Karnataka Legislative Assembly from Tumkur Rural Assembly constituency for the third time representing Bharatiya Janata Party.

== Early life and education ==
Suresh was born in Hutridurga Hobli, Kunigal Taluk, Tumkur district. He completed his PUC from Government Junior College, Malleshwaram, Bangalore. He did his Bachelor of Commerce degree at R.C. College of Commerce, Bangalore, Karnataka.

== Career ==
Suresh is a former BJP district president from Tumkur. He won the Tumkur Rural Assembly constituency representing Bharatiya Janata Party in the 2023 Karnataka Legislative Assembly election. He polled 89,191 votes and defeated his nearest rival, D. C. Gowri Shankar of Janata Dal (Secular) by a margin of 4,594 votes. He lost the 2018 Karnataka Legislative Assembly election. He became an MLA for the first time winning the 2008 Karnataka Legislative Assembly election and retained it in the 2013 Karnataka Legislative Assembly election.
