= Kamanahalli =

Village in Karnataka, India

Coordinates: 13°21′42.84″N 77°4′36.99″E

Kammanahalli is a small village located in Tumkur District, Turuvekere Taluk, Mayasandra Hobli and Vittalapura Post in India's Karnataka State.

The village is about 12 km from Yadiyur which is famous for the Lord Siddalingeshwara Temple and is about 100 km from Bangalore.

The village is having around 150 populations (around 30 families). The average literacy rate is 70% though village is deprived from basic amenities.

Kamanahalli have lord Sri Ranganatha Swamy temple and lord Lakshmi named by lord Sri Muttinamma temple hereby. The festival will be celebrated during the month of March or April, generally the festival will be held for 9 days with cultural programs.

The village main occupation is agriculture, the farmers follow the innovative methods of growing Coconut, Paddy, Raagi, Vegetables and many other crops as required themselves according to seasons and also dairying some of them. There are may coconut trees found around the village. The village is small lake near Sri Muttinamma temple, the lake will be main water source for agriculture. The villagers are also depending on the bore well water for drinking and agriculture as well.

The Shimsha river flows from the north to the south nearby village in the east. The part of water source will be lifted from the river for agriculture, supporting the villagers and their fields.
