= Tumkur Rural Assembly constituency =

Legislative Assembly constituency in Karnataka, India

Coordinates: 13.31°N 76.95°E

Tumkur Rural
- Constituency No. 133 for the Karnataka Legislative Assembly

Constituency details
- Country: India
- Region: South India
- State: Karnataka
- District: Tumkur
- Lok Sabha constituency: Tumkur
- Established: 2008
- Total electors: 208,826 (2023)
- Reservation: None

Member of Legislative Assembly
- 16th Karnataka Legislative Assembly
- Incumbent B. Suresh Gowda
- Party: Bharatiya Janata Party
- Elected year: 2023
- Preceded by: D. C. Gowri Shankar

Tumkur Rural Assembly constituency is one of the 224 constituencies in the Karnataka Legislative Assembly of Karnataka, a southern state of India. It is also part of Tumkur Lok Sabha constituency.

== Members of the Legislative Assembly ==
Election	Member	Party
2008	B. Suresh Gowda	Bharatiya Janata Party
2013	B. Suresh Gowda	Bharatiya Janata Party
2018	D. C. Gowri Shankar	Janata Dal
2023	B. Suresh Gowda	Bharatiya Janata Party

== Election results ==
=== Assembly Election 2023 ===
2023 Karnataka Legislative Assembly election : Tumkur Rural
Party	Candidate	Votes	%	±%
BJP	B. Suresh Gowda	89,191	48.90%	▲4.16
JD(S)	D. C. Gowrishankar Swamy	84,597	46.38%	▼1.63
INC	G. H. Shanmukhappa	4,066	2.23%	▼2.20
NOTA	None of the above	1,200	0.66%	▼0.23
Margin of victory		4,594	2.52%	▼0.75
Turnout		183,039	87.65%	▲2.21
Total valid votes		182,389		
Registered electors		208,826		▲3.50
BJP gain from JD(S)		Swing	▲0.89	

=== Assembly Election 2018 ===
2018 Karnataka Legislative Assembly election : Tumkur Rural
Party	Candidate	Votes	%	±%
JD(S)	D. C. Gowri Shankar	82,740	48.01%	▲12.90
BJP	B. Suresh Gowda	77,100	44.74%	▲8.59
INC	Rayasandra Ravikumar	7,633	4.43%	▼1.22
NOTA	None of the above	1,530	0.89%	New
Margin of victory		5,640	3.27%	▲2.24
Turnout		172,386	85.44%	▲1.73
Total valid votes		172,332		
Registered electors		201,767		▲15.05
JD(S) gain from BJP		Swing	▲11.86	

=== Assembly Election 2013 ===
2013 Karnataka Legislative Assembly election : Tumkur Rural
Party	Candidate	Votes	%	±%
BJP	B. Suresh Gowda	55,029	36.15%	▼13.93
JD(S)	D. C. Gowri Shankar	53,457	35.11%	▲8.38
KJP	H. Ningappa	22,709	14.92%	New
INC	Auditor Nagaraju Yalachavadi	8,599	5.65%	▼12.15
BSP	N. Gangaiah	1,060	0.70%	▼0.47
Independent	Siddaramegowda. T. B	1,041	0.68%	New
JD(U)	B. H. Kalaiah	935	0.61%	New
Margin of victory		1,572	1.03%	▼22.32
Turnout		146,803	83.71%	▲5.64
Total valid votes		152,242		
Registered electors		175,376		▲12.46
BJP hold		Swing	▼13.93	

=== Assembly Election 2008 ===
2008 Karnataka Legislative Assembly election : Tumkur Rural
Party	Candidate	Votes	%	±%
BJP	B. Suresh Gowda	60,904	50.08%	New
JD(S)	H. Ningappa	32,512	26.73%	New
INC	Arakere Rudresh	21,642	17.80%	New
Independent	Syed Imthiyaz Pasha	1,463	1.20%	New
BSP	Syed Mukbul Ahamed	1,419	1.17%	New
Independent	Siddaramegowda. T. B	1,111	0.91%	New
Independent	K. V. Sreenivasaiah	1,063	0.87%	New
Margin of victory		28,392	23.35%	
Turnout		121,751	78.07%	
Total valid votes		121,617		
Registered electors		155,943		
BJP win (new seat)				

== See also ==
- List of constituencies of Karnataka Legislative Assembly
- Tumkur district
