= Huliyurdurga =

- Village
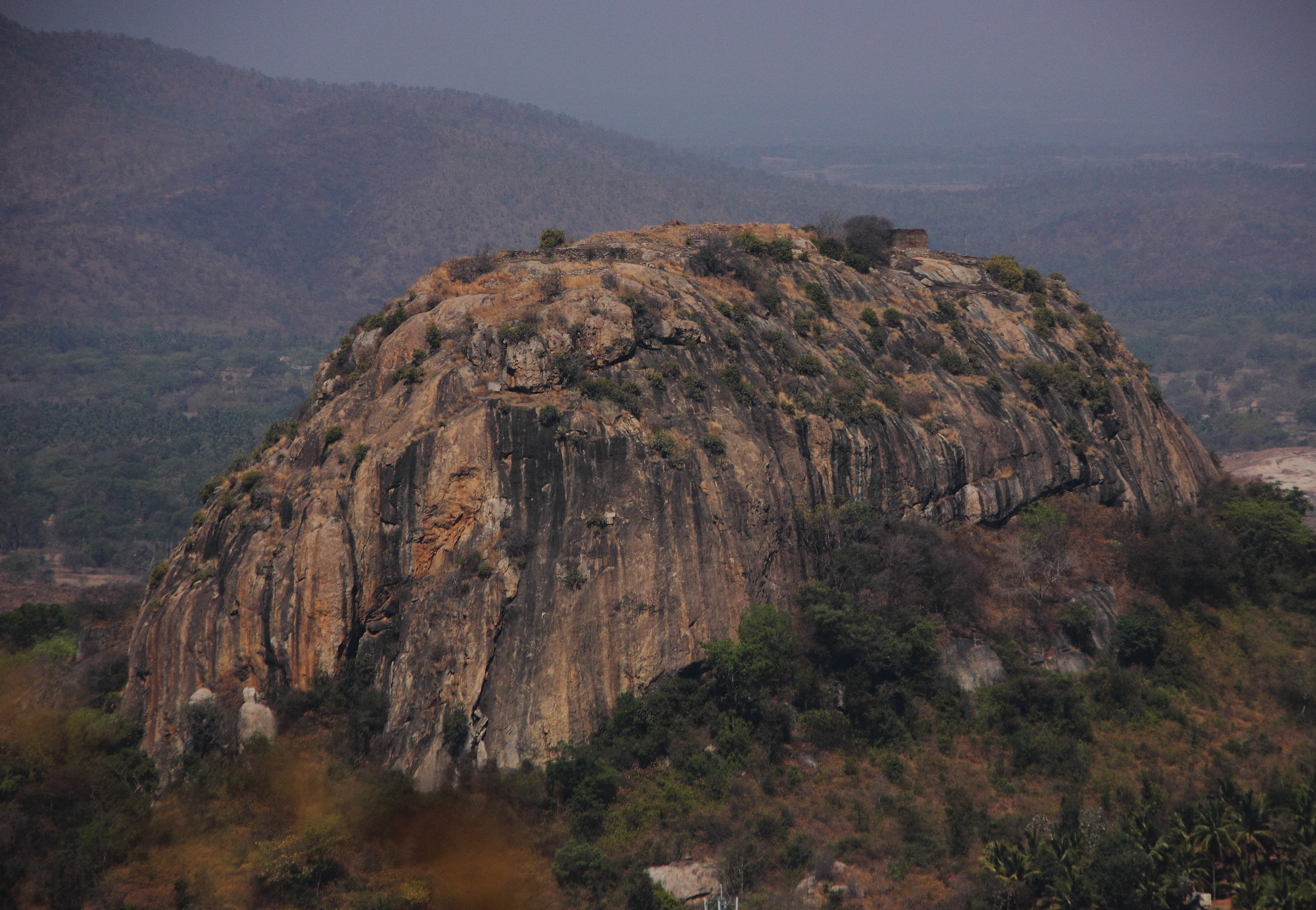
- Kumbi Betta

- Location in Karnataka, India Huliyurdurga (India)
- Coordinates: 12°49′N 77°02′E
- Country: India
- State: Karnataka
- District: Tumkur
- Talukas: Kunigal

Population (2001)
  - Total: 8,399

Languages
  - Official: Kannada
- Time zone: UTC+5:30 (IST)

Huliyurdurga is a village in the state of Karnataka, India. It is located in the Kunigal taluk of Tumakuru District of Karnataka.

== Demographics ==
As of 2011 India census, Huliyurdurga had a population of 7989 with 4034 males and 3955 females.

== Geography ==
Huliyurdurga is:

- 60 km south of Tumkur,
- 22 km south of Kunigal and
- 30 km from Ramanagara.

It is now the headquarters of the hobli of the same name. It was the headquarters of the taluk of the same name till 1873. It is situated at the foot of the hill of the same name. The Huliyurdurga hill is shaped like an inverted cup.

The fort on the hill is 845 meters above mean sea level and is said to have been erected by Kempe Gowda, the Magadi chief. The fort has ruins of:

- Springs,
- Houses,
- Gunpowder magazines,
- Granaries,
- A Durbar Hall

and other structures (remains of).

A temple close to this hill is said to have been built by 'Chikkadevaraya Wodeyar'. It has carved granite pillars in the Navaranga. The temple of Mallikarjuna is situated on the summit of Hemagiri hill, which is beside Huliyurdurga. A shrine of Varadaraja, locally known as Hemagiriyappa, where the object of worship is a round stone, is on the eastern slope of Hemagiri. The southern slope has a shrine of Bhairava. Hemagiri hill is higher than Huliyurdurga but has no fort.

== Gallery ==
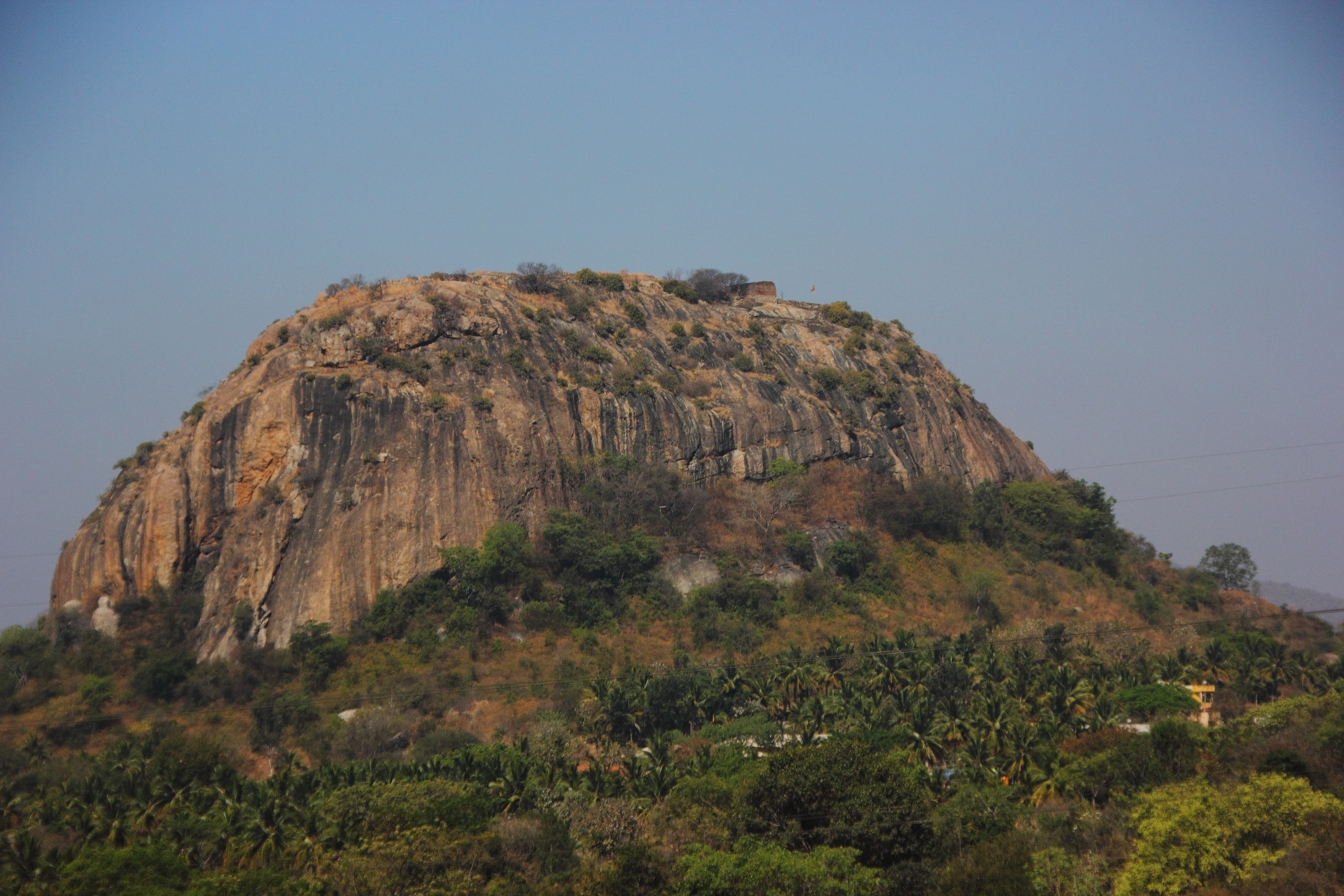
Kumbi Betta - A view from Hemagiri

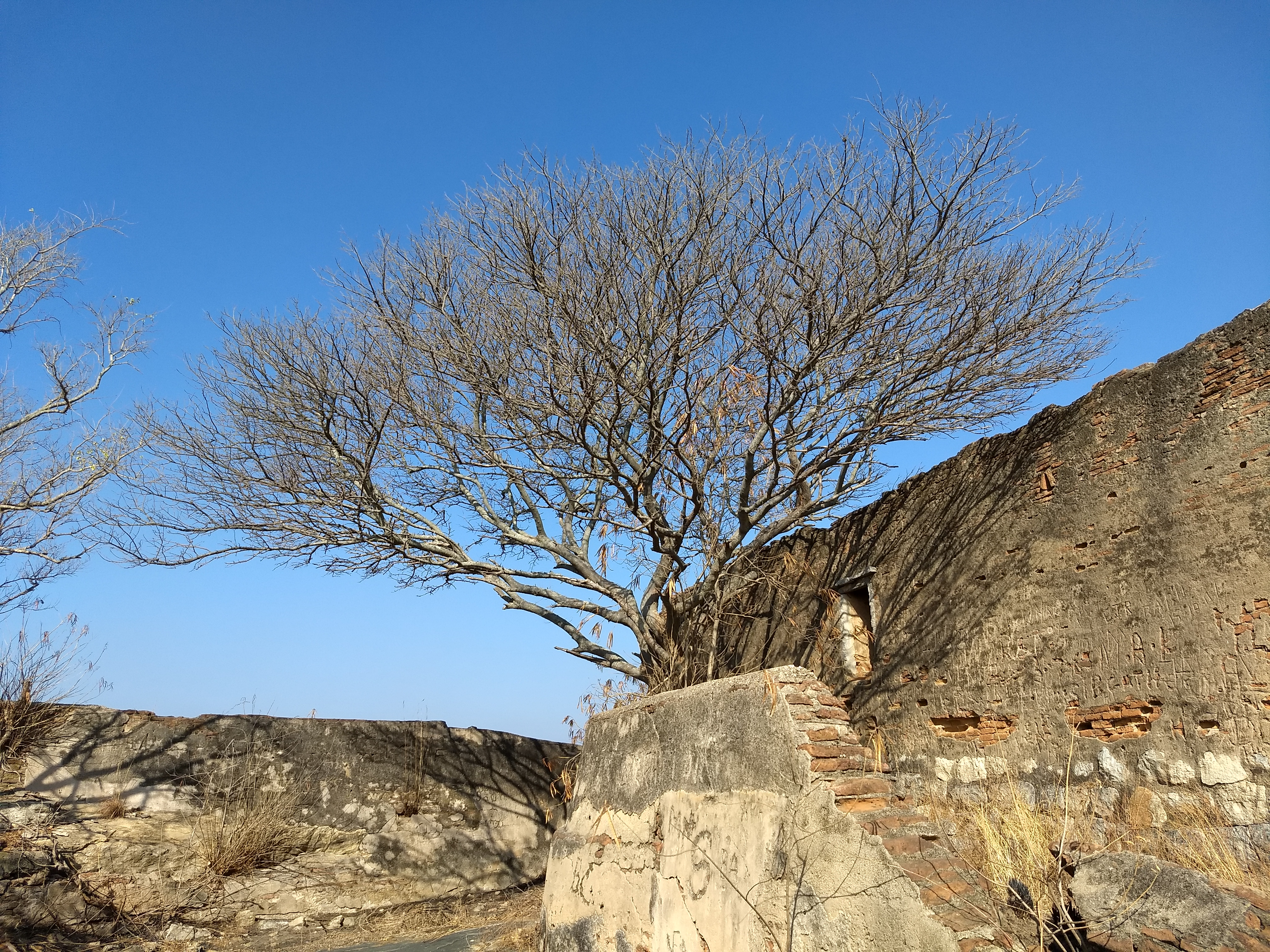
Ruins of fort on top of Kumbi Betta

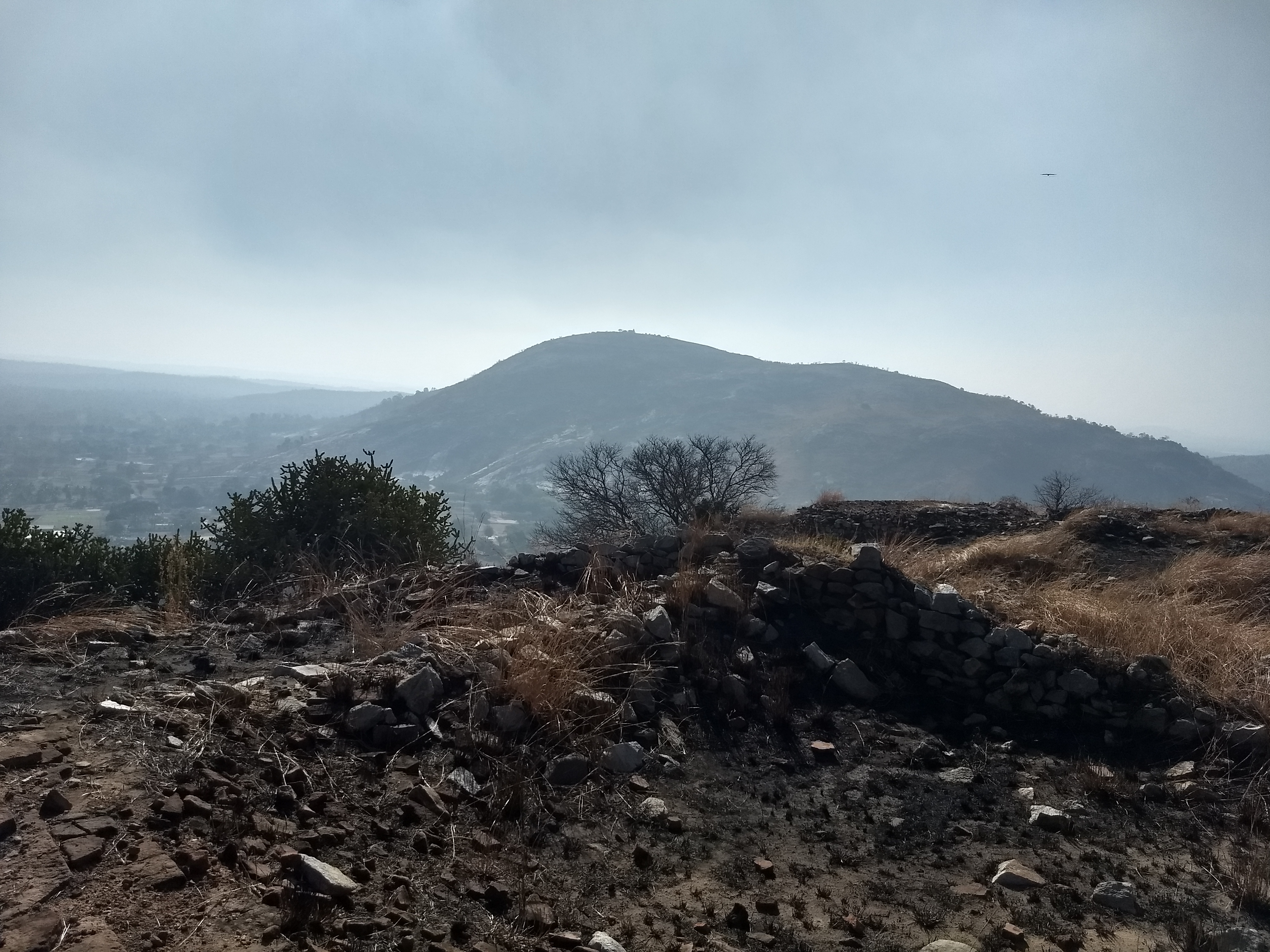
A view of Hemagiri Hill from Kumbi Betta

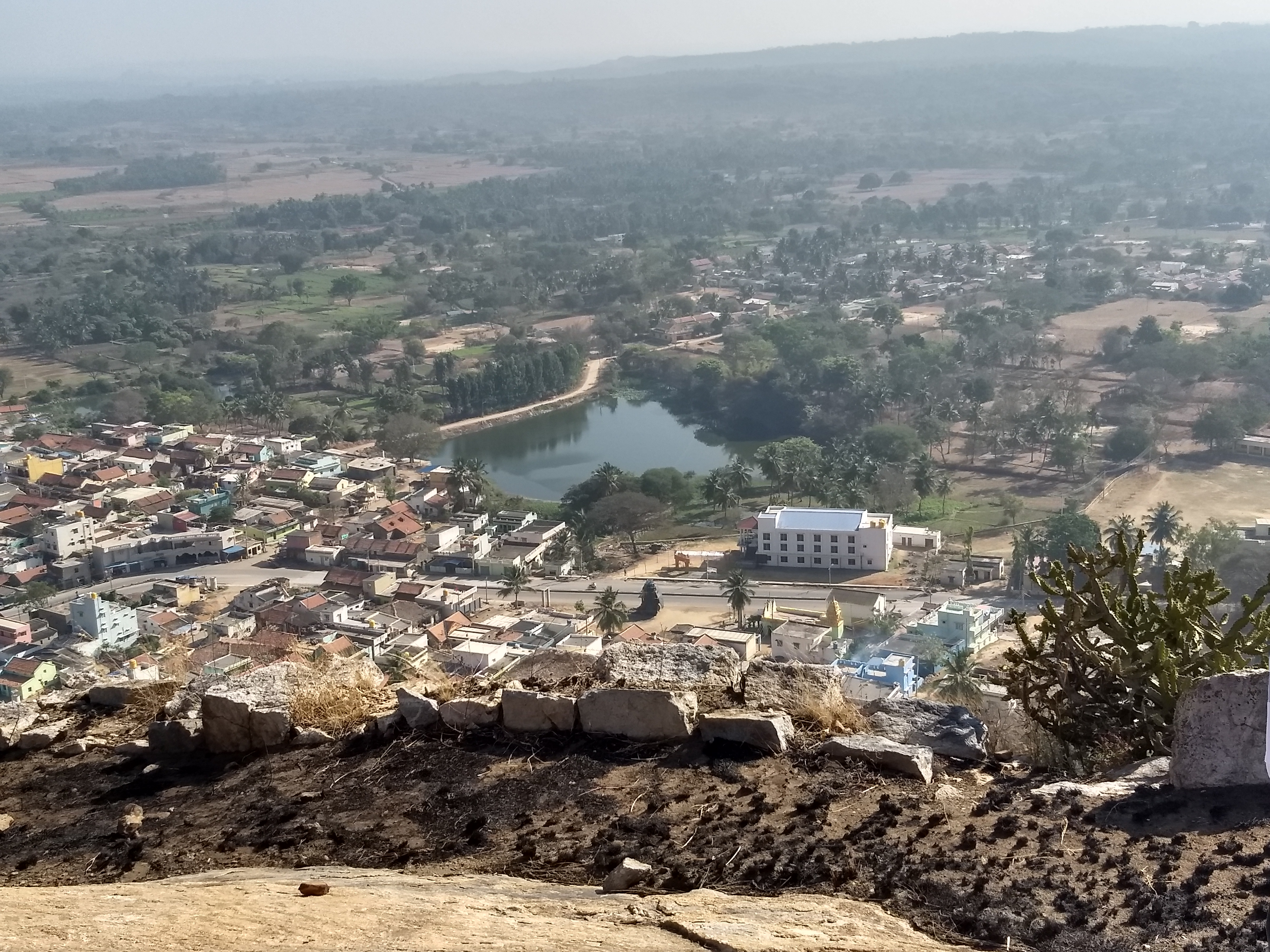
A View of Huliyur Durga City from top of Kumbi Betta

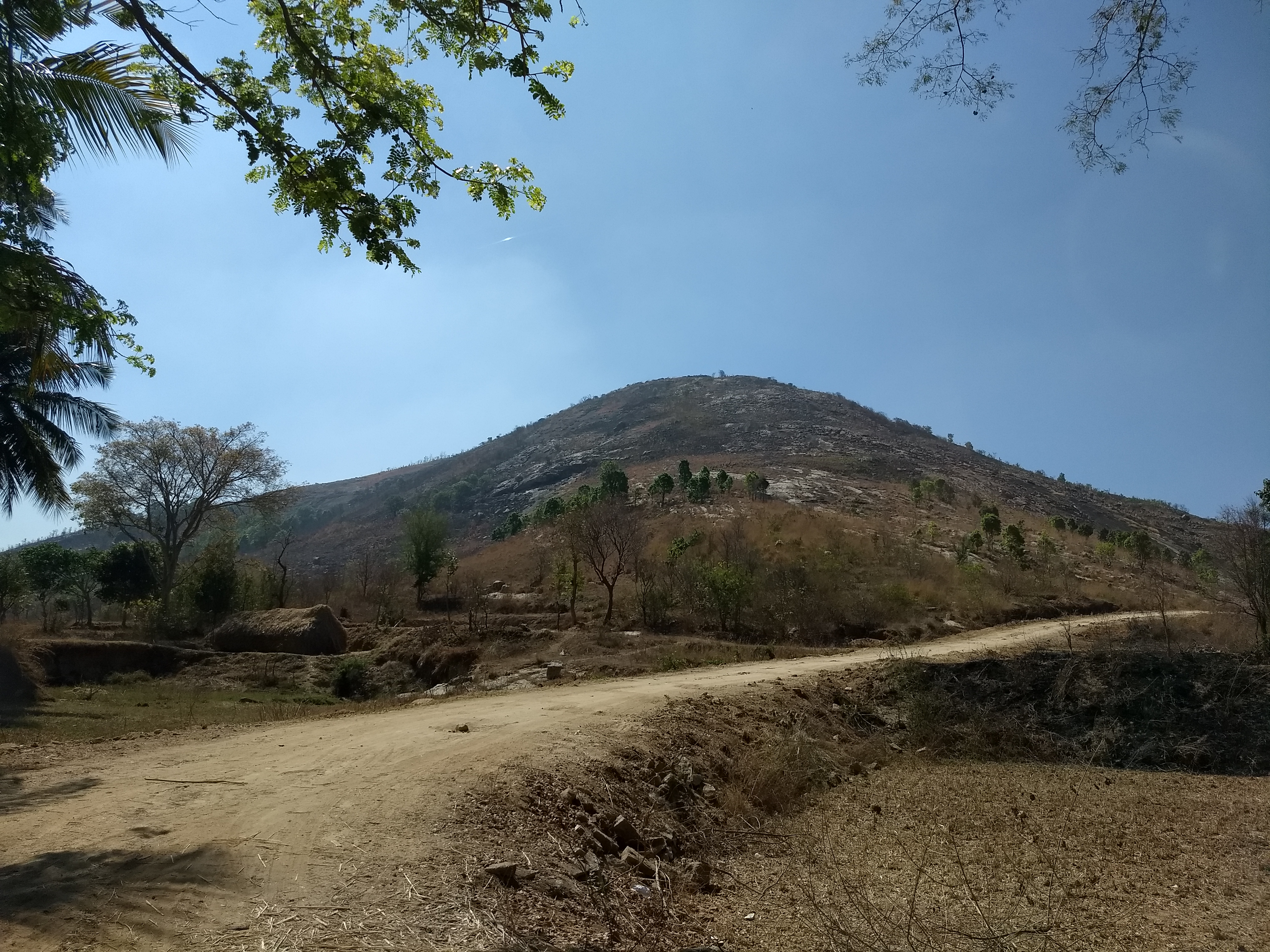
Hemagiri Hill

== See also ==
- Tumkur
- Districts of Karnataka
