= Kunigal =

Town in Karnataka, India

- Town
- Nickname: Horse town
- Location in Karnataka, India
- Coordinates: 13.02°N 77.03°E
- Country: India
- State: Karnataka
- District: Tumakuru

Government
  - Body: Town Municipal Council

Area
  - Town: 8 km^{2} (3.1 sq mi)
  - Rural: 974.75 km^{2} (376.35 sq mi)
- Elevation: 773 m (2,536 ft)

Population (2011)
  - Town: 34,155
  - Density: 4,300/km^{2} (11,000/sq mi)
  - Rural: 191,628

Languages
  - Official: Kannada
- Time zone: UTC+5:30 (IST)
- PIN: 572130
- Telephone code: 91/08132
- Vehicle registration: KA-06
- Website: kunigaltown.mrc.gov.in

Kunigal is a town in Tumakuru District in the Indian state of Karnataka. It is the headquarters of Kunigal taluk. As of 2011 census, the town has a population of 34,155.

Kunigal is famous for stud farm established by Hyderali and Tippu Sulthan for training war horses. After them this stud farm was maintained by Mysore wodeyars. Now this stud farm is leased to Vijayamalya for breeding Race Horses. Kunigal lake is the second largest lake in karnataka.

Nartanapuri is another name of Kunigal.

== Geography and Nearby Places of Interest ==
Kunigal is located at 13.02°N 77.03°E. It has an average elevation of 773 metres (2536 feet). It is situated on the National Highway 75 (India) connecting Bengaluru and Mangaluru and State Highway 33 (Karnataka) connecting Tumakuru and Madduru. Kunigal is situated 70 kilometres west of Bengaluru and 115 kilometres north of Mysuru. Recently opened Hassan-Bangalore railway line transverses through Kunigal.

This place is also referred as Kunuglu or Kuningalu in inscriptions. Kunigal is situated at a distance of about 35 km south of Tumakuru on the Bengaluru -Hassan road, and 70 km from Bengaluru

- The derivation of the name is said to be from Kuniyuva-Kallu (dancing stone). When Kunigal Tank discharges, due to the force of the flowing water, boulders at the lake bund used to jump up and down, Natives might have exclaimed as Kuniyuva Kallu. Later this has changed into Kuni Kallu and to the present farm Kunigal. According to a legend Shiva had danced here along with Parvathi during his Loka Sanchara
- Three streams rising in Shivaganga, namely, Nalini, Nagini and Kamala are said to unite their waters here.
- It is said that the Ganga King Shivarama was the governor of this place. In 785 A.D. one Veera Kambala Raya is said to have laid the foundation for the fort here. The place which was an agrahara during the Hoysalas came into the possession of the Magadi chief who enlarged the town and the fort. Up to 1873 this place was a village. and Huliyurudurga was the Taluk Administration Headquarter. Later in 1873 Kunigal was given the Status of Taluk Headquarter.
- The Narasimha temple here is a large structure of the Hoysala period altered during the Vijayanagara days. But it contains a figure of Janardana said to have been brought from Huliyurdurga.
- The large Someshvara temple has a mahadwara in the south and an udbhava linga. The Padmeshvara temple in the Hoysala style consists of a garbhagriha, a shukanasi and a navaranga.
- The three-celled Venkataramana temple has a good figure of Shrinivasa.
- The Shivarameshwara temple, a new one, has a figure of Mahishasuramardini made in the Ganga style and is said to have been brought from Kortagere.
- Sri Bettada Ranganathaswamy Temple, surrounded by the forest (approximate 1400 hectares) is among beautiful tourist attractions located 5 km away from Kunigal city and also can have a good view of kunigal kere (the famed lake of Kunigal) and city from this temple.
- The place has a stud farm, continuing to exist from the days of Hyderali and is famous for sericulture and also beedi rolling.
- Other notable places in the taluk are as follows:
- Huliyurdurga: is about 64 km south of Tumkur town and about 38 km south of Kunigal.

It is now the headquarters of the hobli of the same name was once the headquarters of the taluk of the same name till 1873. It is situated on the foot of the hill of the same name. The hill is a solid mass of rock and has the peculiar appearance of an inverted cup. The fortification of the hill commanding the place is about 845 metres above the sea level and were said to have been erected by Kempe Gowda, the Magadi chief. There are springs, ruined houses, powder magazines granaries, durbar hall and other remains. •The Gopalakrishna temple close to this hill is said to have been built by Kempe Gowda or by Chikkadeveraya Wodeyar. It has well worked granite pillars in the navaranga.The temple of Mallikarjuna is situated on the summit of Hemagiri hill which is by the side of Huliyurudurga.A shrine of Vadirajaru locally known as Hemagiriyappa is on the eastern slope of Hemagiri where the object of worship is a round stone and on the southern slope is a shrine of Bhairava. The hill is loftier than Huliyurudurga but not fortified.

- Hutridurga, also known as Doddabetta, is a fortified hill in the south-east of Kunigal taluk, rising to 3708 feet above the sea level.

The hill has eight gateways from the foot to the summit in addition to several outer gates. On the summit known as Sankarakumbhi is situated a small Shankareshvara temple with a spring called Dodda done or big spring in front of it From the summit, we get an extensive view of the surrounding landscape dotted by a large number of tanks and hills.

Hutridurga derives its name from Hutri, a village situated about 3 km from the foot of the hill. The village immediately at the foot of the hill is known as Santhepet and that situated on the first elevation as Hutridurga. The Hutridurga village has several temples of Adinarayana, Veerabhadra and Anjaneya etc.

Near Hutridurga is the village of Sondalagere, famous for Kambada Narasimha Swamy temple. The village is situated on Kunigal - Magadi road via Kempanahalli at a distance of 12 km from Kunigal town and well connected by bus service. The village provides a picturesque view of Hutidurga hill.

- The Harivayu farm: located in the south of Kunigal and about 6 kms from Amruturu, known for its practice of organic farming and solar utilisation for agriculture.Headed by the company ener-g-kid india with a collaboration of top agricultural scientists
- Amruturu - at a distance of about 11 km south-west of Kunigal town is the headquarters of the hobli of the same name. In ancient period this place was an agrahara and was popularly called Atakur and Veera-Narasimhapur.

•The Chennakeshava temple here is a representation of Dravidian style of architecture of the 16th century A.D. The Someshvara temple also called Chandramaulishwara near the tank at this place is of the 16th century A.D.The Pattalamma temple (the village goddess) has several painted stucco figures of which Pattalamma and Lakshmi are canopied by a seven-hooded serpent. The leelas (divine play) of Shiva and 10 incarnations of Vishnu have been painted on the walls and beams of the temple.

- Very near to this place at Marconahalli, a dam has been built across the Shimsha River forming the biggest reservoir in the district. The dam was completed in 1939.
- Sri Daithamaramma Devi temple, located at Kadashettahalli village near-by Marconahalli dam is one of the major shakthi forms which has an history prevailing to the ancient times.
- 'Yedeyur- the headquarters of the hobli of the same name, is about 19 km south-west of Kunigal.

•The Siddalingeshvara temple here, a celebrated pilgrim centre, faces north and is a large structure of Dravidian style of architecture.It has the gaddige of Tontada Siddhalinga, who lived in the 16th century A.D. a highly venerated Veerashiva teacher and author of many works. He is believed to have traveled in the whole country with a huge band of followers preaching Veerashaivism and principles of love, compassion and brotherhood. The ceiling of the mukhamantapa of the temple and the hall in the lower level have painted on them scenes from the life of Siddhalinga and the incarnations of Shiva.There is a managing committee constituted by the State Government.Pilgrims are fed free here. The car festival (Rathotsava) in honour of Siddhalingeshvara is held during March–April. There is also a temple of Varadaraja here and two other Veerashaiva mathas. (Source: Karnataka State Gazetteer 1983)

== Matthew Male's Description of Coonghul, 1850 ==
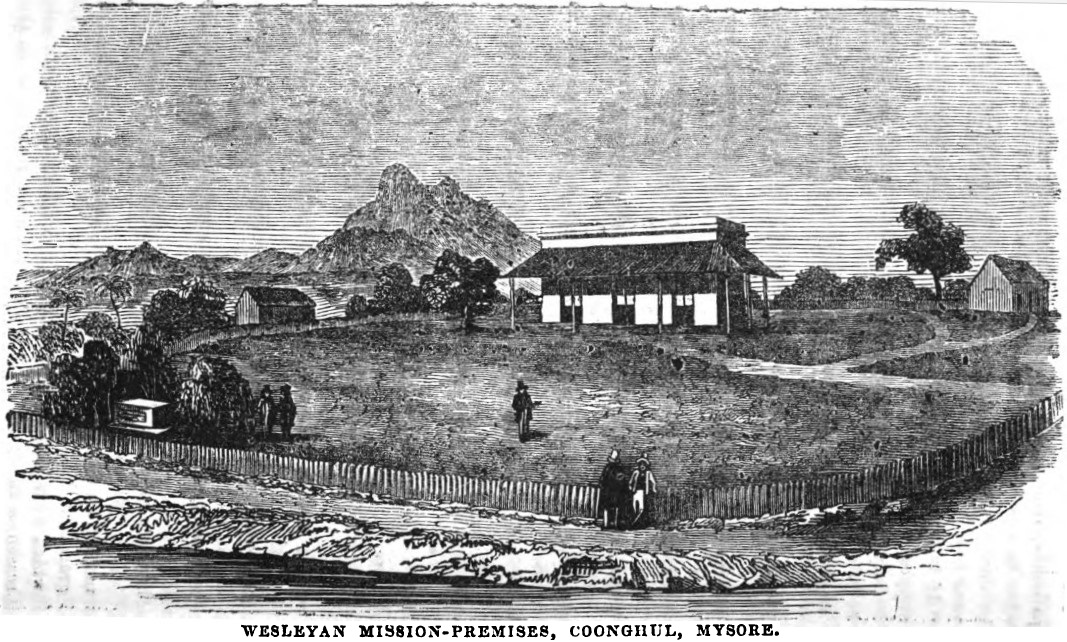
Wesleyan-Mission Premises, Coonghul, Mysore (1850)

Description of the Kunigal Town in the mid 19th century is narrated by Matthew T Male, a Wesleyan Missionary, in his article in the magazine The Wesleyan Juvenile Offering, published by the Wesleyan Methodist Missionary Society in October 1850.

Coonghul (Kunigal) is a town in the Mysore Kingdom, located at about 50 miles west of Bangalore. A mission house was set up in Coonghul, consisting of 2 small rooms, which were later enlarged after some funds were received from England. The mission house is located on high ground, a short distance from the town. A stream which flows into a valley had been stopped to form a small artificial lake. During Monsoon, the lake was about 10 miles round. There were groves of coconut and other trees. There were also some hills, which gave the place variety and beauty. The population of the town was mainly Hindu. However, there were also a considerable population of Muslims. A few Roman Catholics also lived in the town.

A Mission Chapel was built in Coonghul in 1844, which also served as the school room. The missionaries preached their sermons on Sundays in this building. In 1850, besides, Matthew Male, there was only one other European living in Coonghul.

== Demographics ==
As of 2001 India census, Kunigal had a population of 30,291. Males constitute 51% of the population and females 49%. Kunigal has an average literacy rate of 69%, higher than the national average of 59.5%: male literacy is 74%, and female literacy is 64%. In Kunigal, 12% of the population is under 6 years of age.

== Transport ==
=== Road ===
Kunigal lies on NH 75. Another highway SH-33 pass through this town, connecting it to Tumkur and Mysuru.

=== Rail ===
Kunigal has a railway station (Station Code:KIGL). It lies on Bangalore - Hassan line.

== Image gallery ==
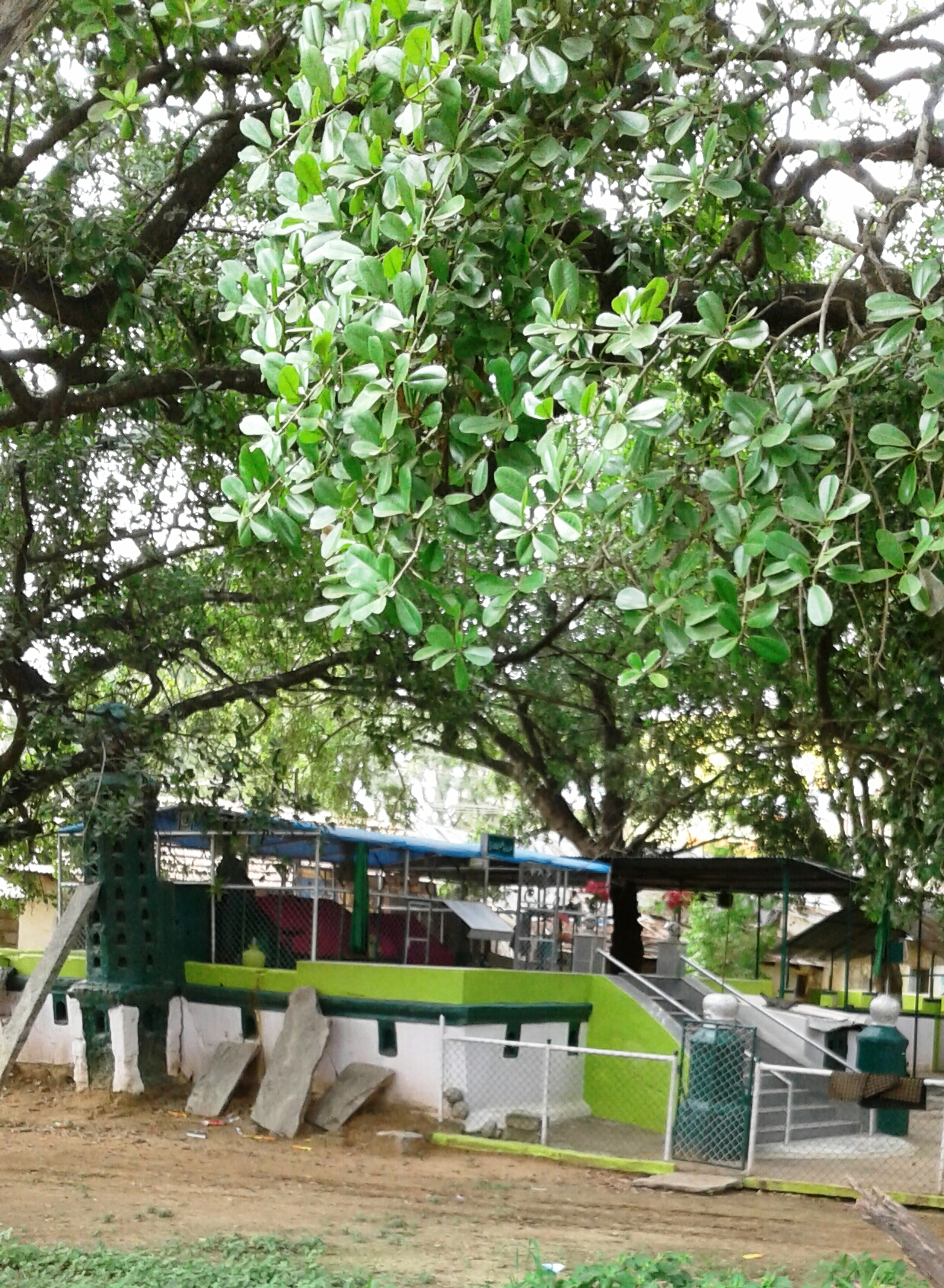
Shrine on Bangalore Road

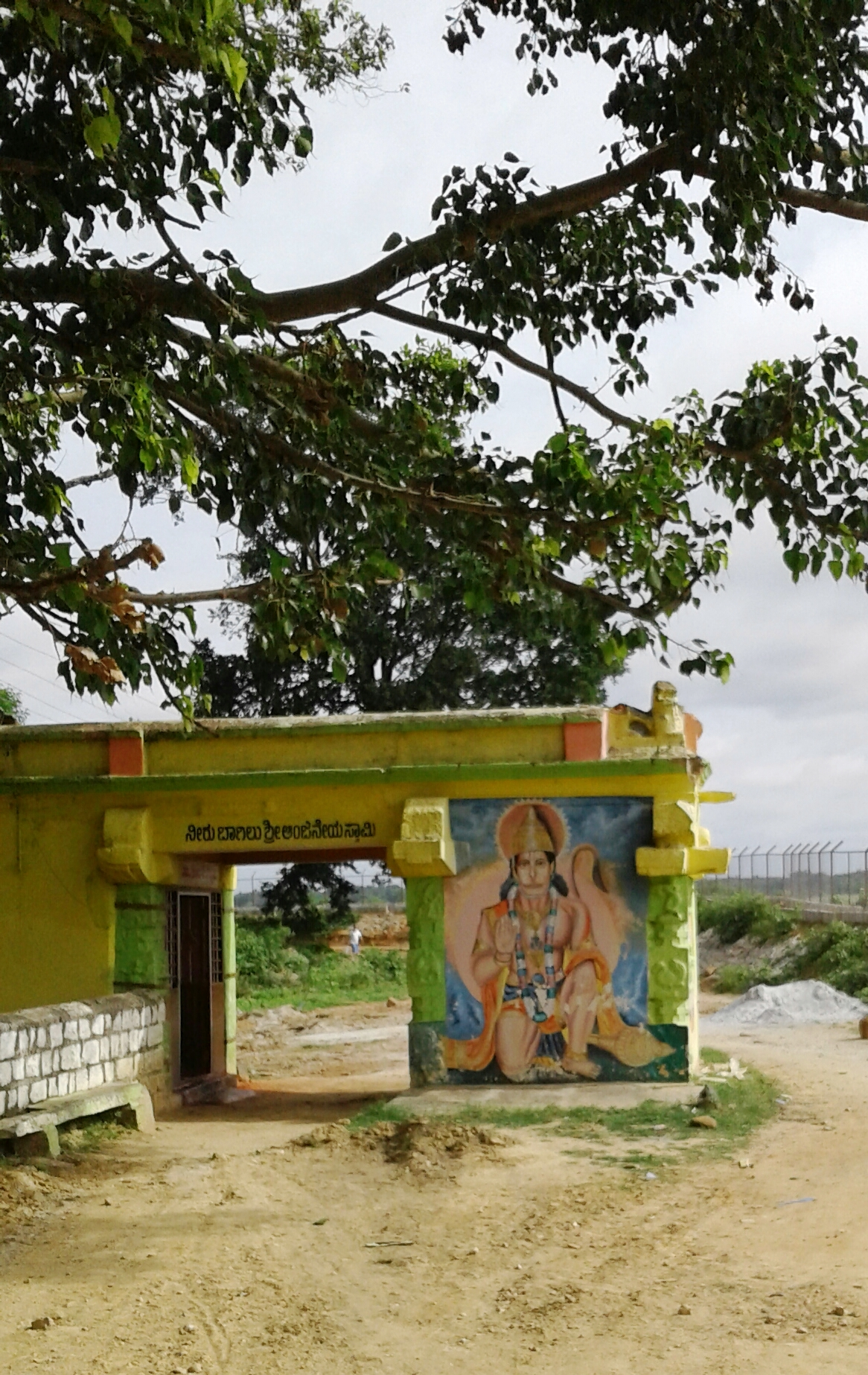
Lake Road

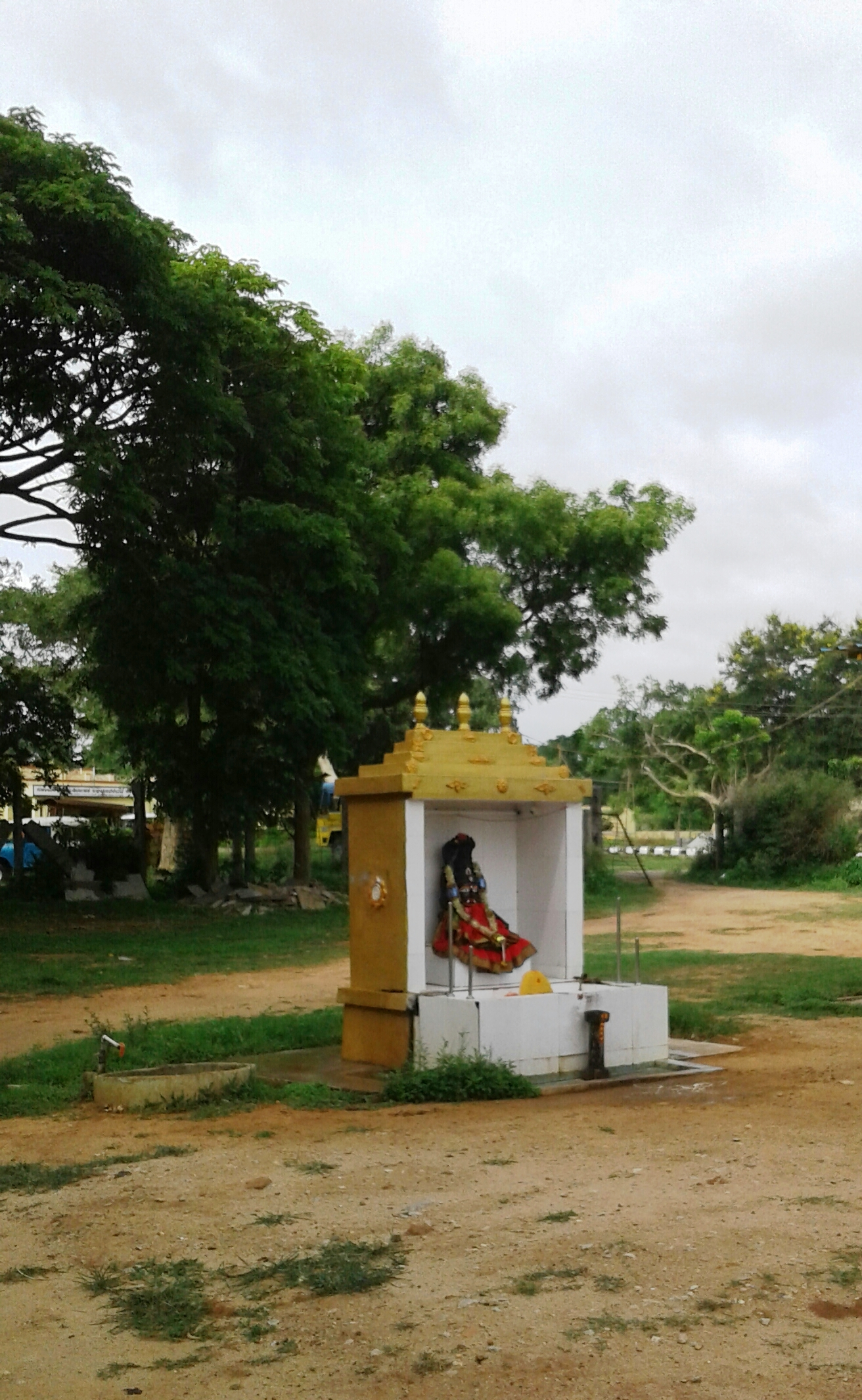
Forest Temple

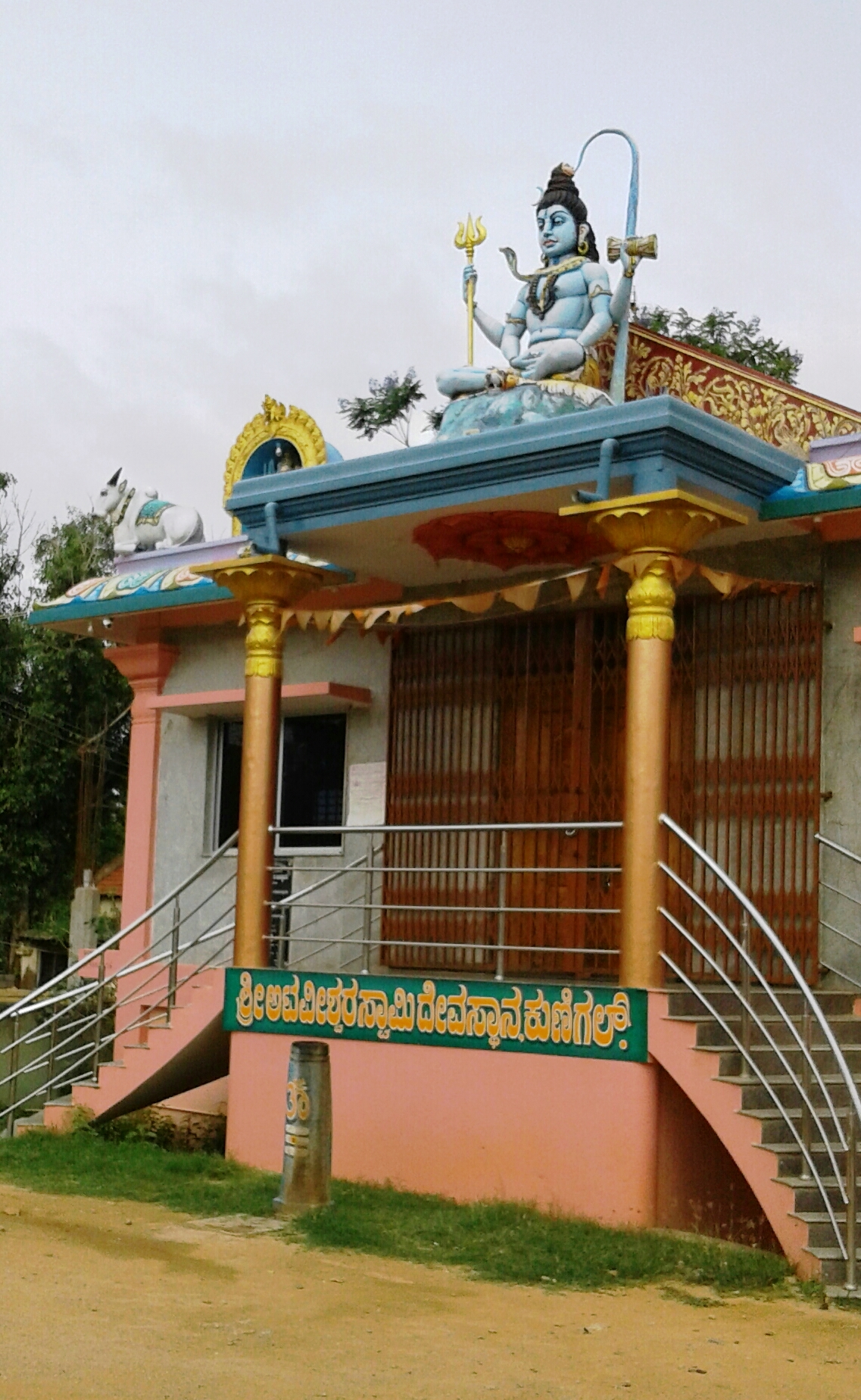
Town Temple
