= D. C. Gowri Shankar =

Indian politician

D. C. Gowri Shankar is an Indian politician and former Member of the Legislative Assembly (India) in Karnataka. He was elected to the Karnataka Legislative Assembly from Madhugiri in the 2008 Karnataka Legislative Assembly election as a member of the Janata Dal (Secular).

After 2008 elections he contested as a JDS candidate for Tumkur Rural Assembly constituency and lost by a small margin of 1500 votes and then again contested 2018 elections and won by a margin of 5640 votes and became the MLA for second time and entered the assembly. Under the coalition government of JDS and Congress he chaired the MSIL foundation for 6 months.

In March 2023, Gowri Shankar was disqualified by the Karnataka High Court as an MLA for the Tumkur Rural assembly constituency. Justice S. Sunil Dutt Yadav ruled that Gowri Shankar had used unauthorized means in campaigning for his election in 2018.
