= Yedeyur =

Yedeyur Yediyur, Yedeyuru
- Town
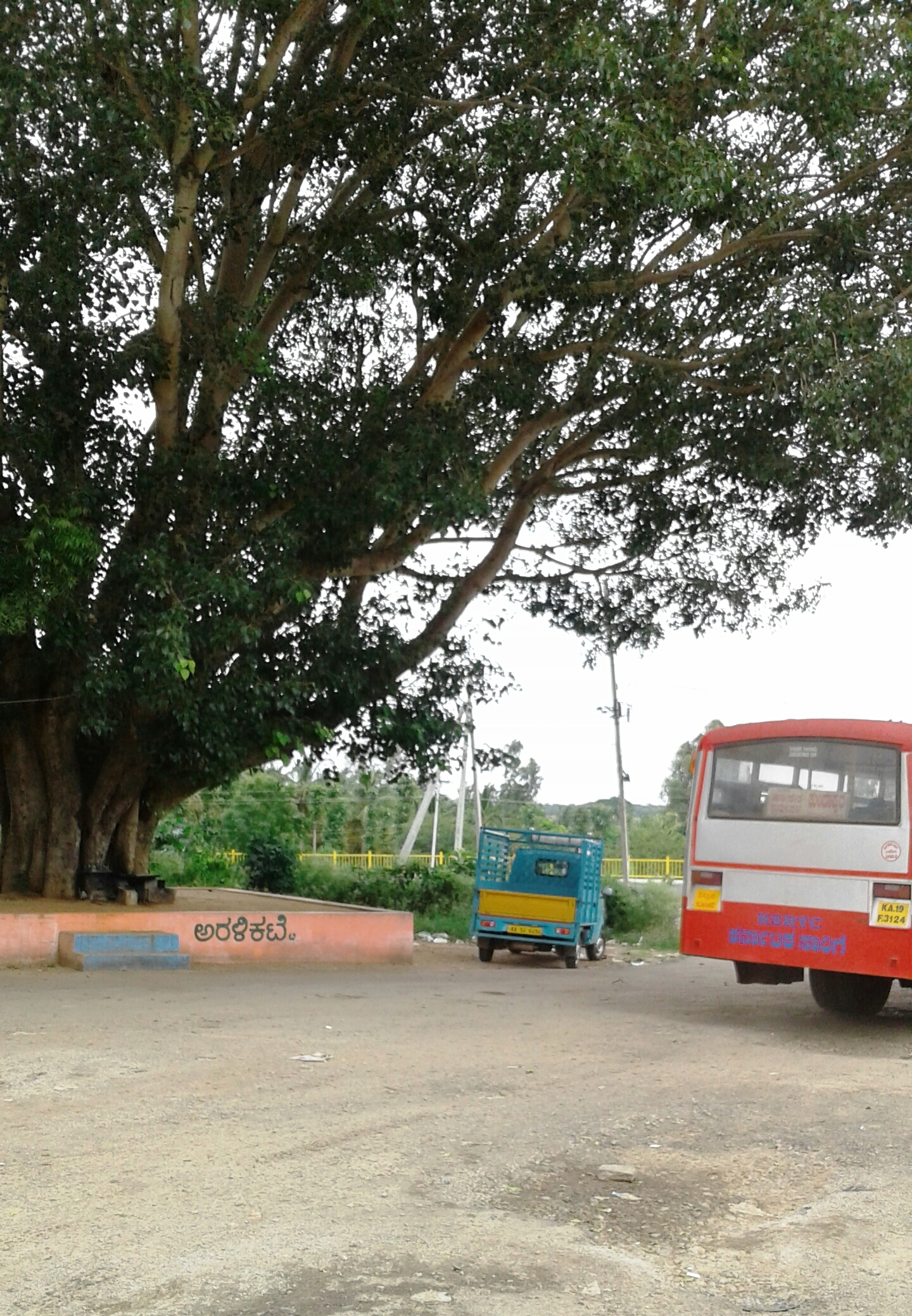
- Siddapura, Yadiyur

- Location in Karnataka, India
- Coordinates: 12°58′22″N 76°51′34″E
- Country: India
- State: Karnataka
- District: Tumakuru

Area
  - Total: 9 km^{2} (3.5 sq mi)
- Elevation: 743 m (2,438 ft)

Languages
  - Official: Kannada
- Time zone: UTC+5:30 (IST)
- Postal code: 572142
- Vehicle registration: KA-44
- Nearest city: Kunigal

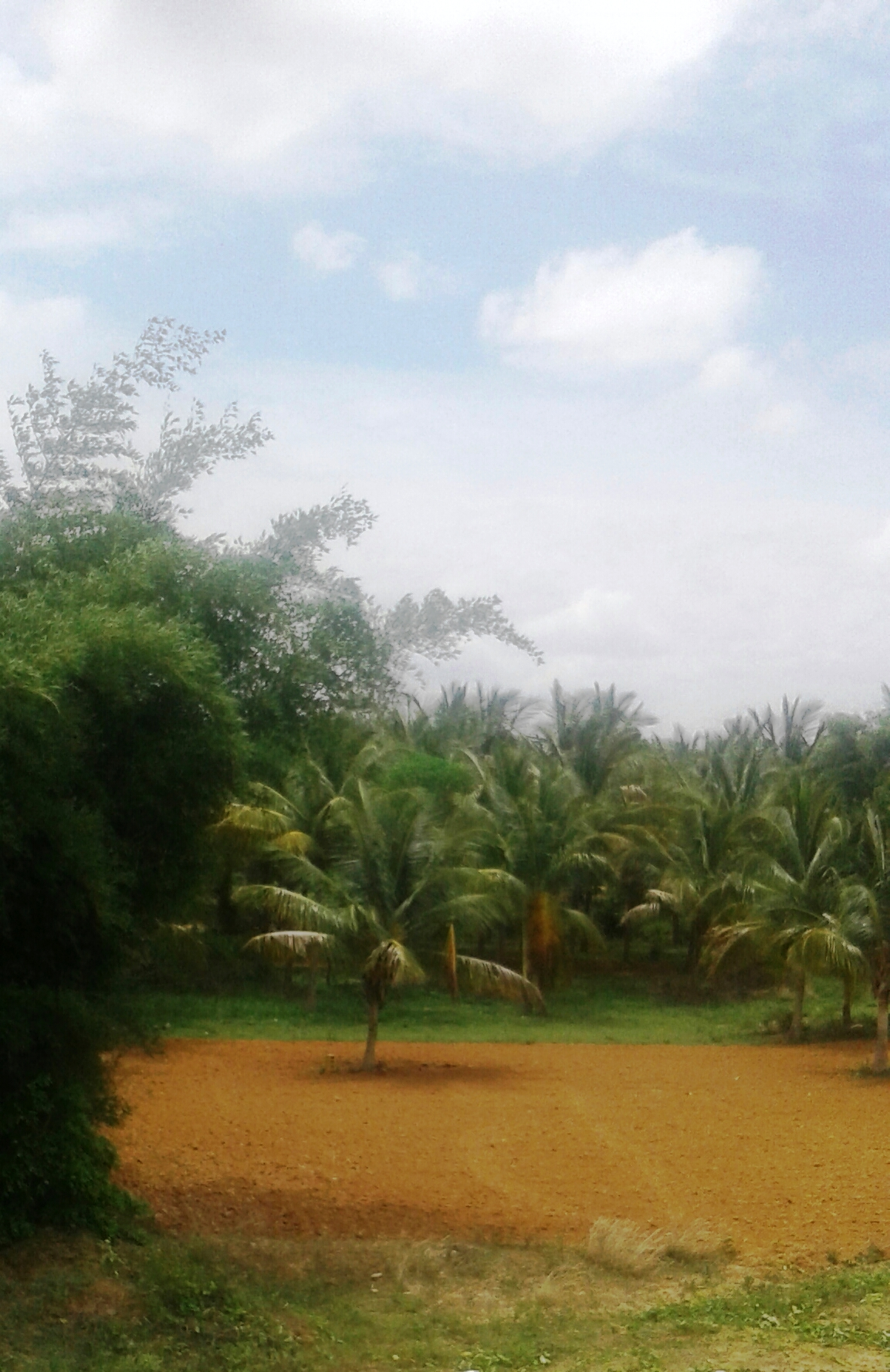
Siddapura, Yediyur

Yedeyur (variant spellings include: Yediyur; Yadiyur; Yadiyūr) is a town in the Kunigal talluk, Tumkur district of Karnataka state, India. It is an important center of pilgrimage for people of the Lingayat faith. It serves as both a temple to and tomb of Siddalinga Shivayogi, a great Lingayat saint of the 15th century.

Yedeyur is situated about 19 km from Kunigal taluk and about 20 km before the cross on the Bangalore-Mangalore Highway.

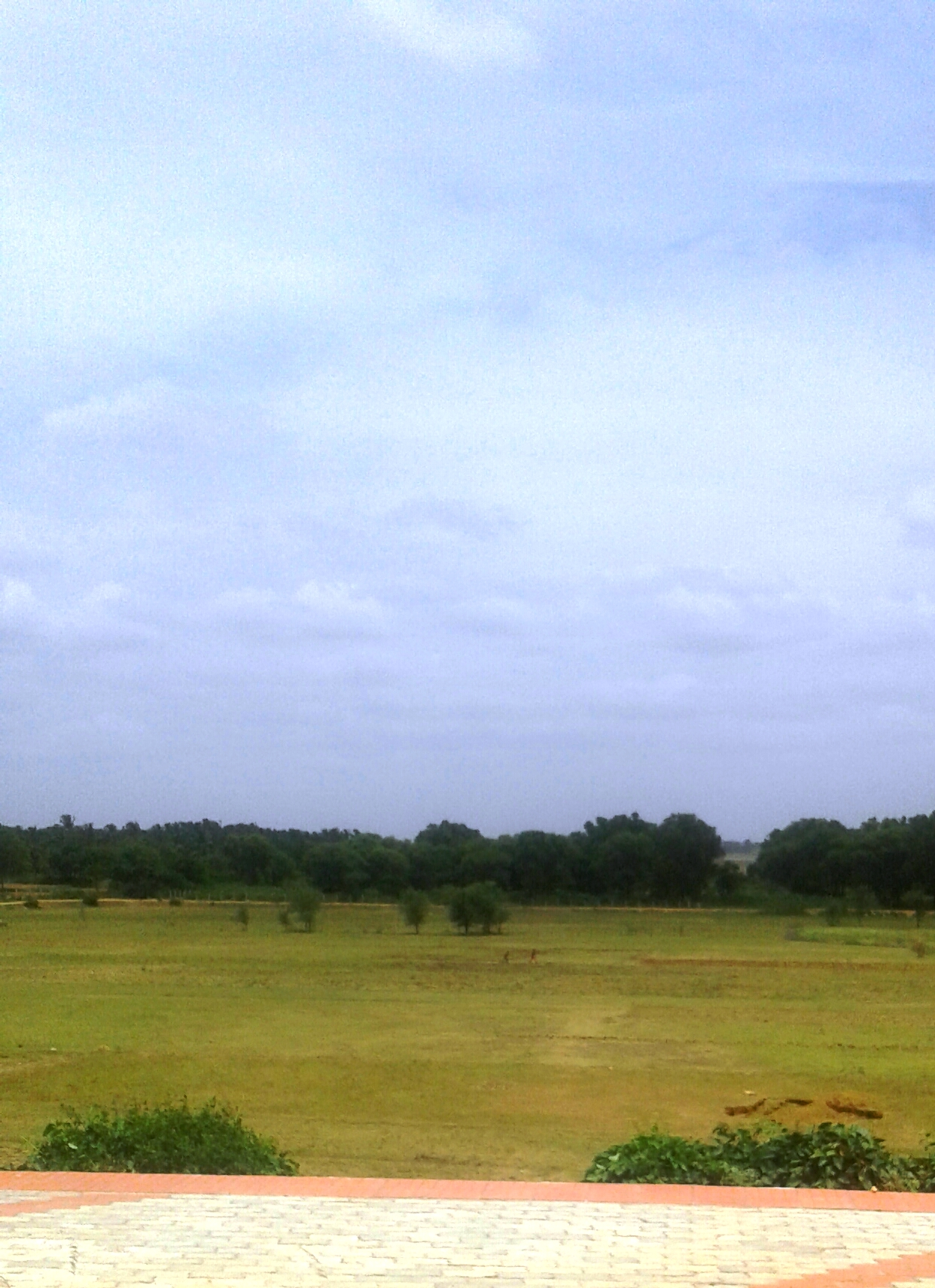
Yediyur Railway Station
