= Hutridurga =

Huthridurga Uttari Betta
- Hobli and Village
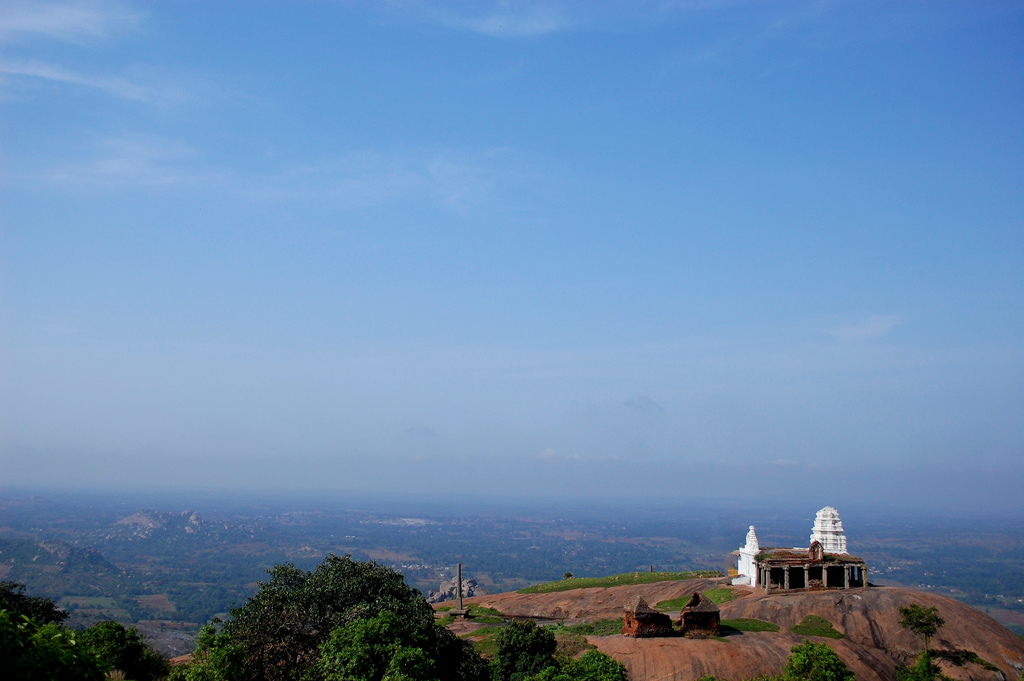
- Nickname: Uttari Betta
- Location in Karnataka, India
- Coordinates: 12°57′21″N 77°7′15″E
- Country: India
- State: Karnataka
- District tumkur: Tumkur
- Founder: Kempegowda I

Government
  - Type: Democracy
  - Body: Grama panchayath

Area
  - Total: 5.51 km^{2} (2.13 sq mi)
- Elevation: 860 m (2,820 ft)

Population (2011)
  - Total: 953
  - Density: 173/km^{2} (448/sq mi)

Languages
  - Official: Kannada
- Time zone: UTC+5:30 (IST)
- PIN: 572126
- Vehicle registration: KA-06

Hutridurga, also known as Uttari Betta, is a village and also a fortified hill in the south-east of Kunigal taluk. The hill is 1,142 metres (3,747 ft) above mean sea level that is located 15 km south-east of Kunigal. Hutridurga is situated about 65 km west of Bengaluru. It is situated off the Kunigal-Magadi State Highway 94 (Karnataka), at a distance of about 7 km from it and 10 km from the Anchepalya industrial area on the Bengaluru-Mangalore National Highway (India) near Kunigal.

The hill fort has eight gateways from the foot to the summit in addition to several outer gates. On the summit known as Sankarakumbhi is situated a small Shankareshwara temple with a spring called Dodda done or big spring in front of it. From the summit, we get an extensive view of the surrounding landscape dotted by a large number of tanks and hills. Hutridurga derives its name from Hutri, a village situated about 3 km from the foot of the hill. The village immediately at the foot of the hill is known as Santhepet and that situated on the first elevation as Hutridurga. The Hutridurga village has several temples of Adinarayana, Veerabhadra and Anjaneya etc.

Near Hutridurga is the village of Sondalagere, home to the Kambada Narasimha Swamy (Pillar Narasimha Swamy) temple. The village is situated on Kunigal - Magadi road via Kempanahalli at a distance of 12 km from Kunigal town and connected by bus service. The village has views of Hutidurga hill.

== History ==
Hutridurga was built by Kempegowda in the 16th century. Ruined fortifications are still visible on the two hillocks surrounding the village. Historically, Huthridurga Fort was the military bastion of Tipu Sultan against British, which was conquered by the latter in 1791. It is believed to have been a seven tiered fort and is considered one among the nine "Durgas" (fortified hills) around Bengaluru ("Nava Durgas"). It has a small temple dedicated to Shiva known as the Shankareshwara temple, a Nandi idol on the top of the hill and an Anjaneya temple, midway. Aadi Narayanaswamy and Veerabhadra temples are situated in the village.

== Gallery ==
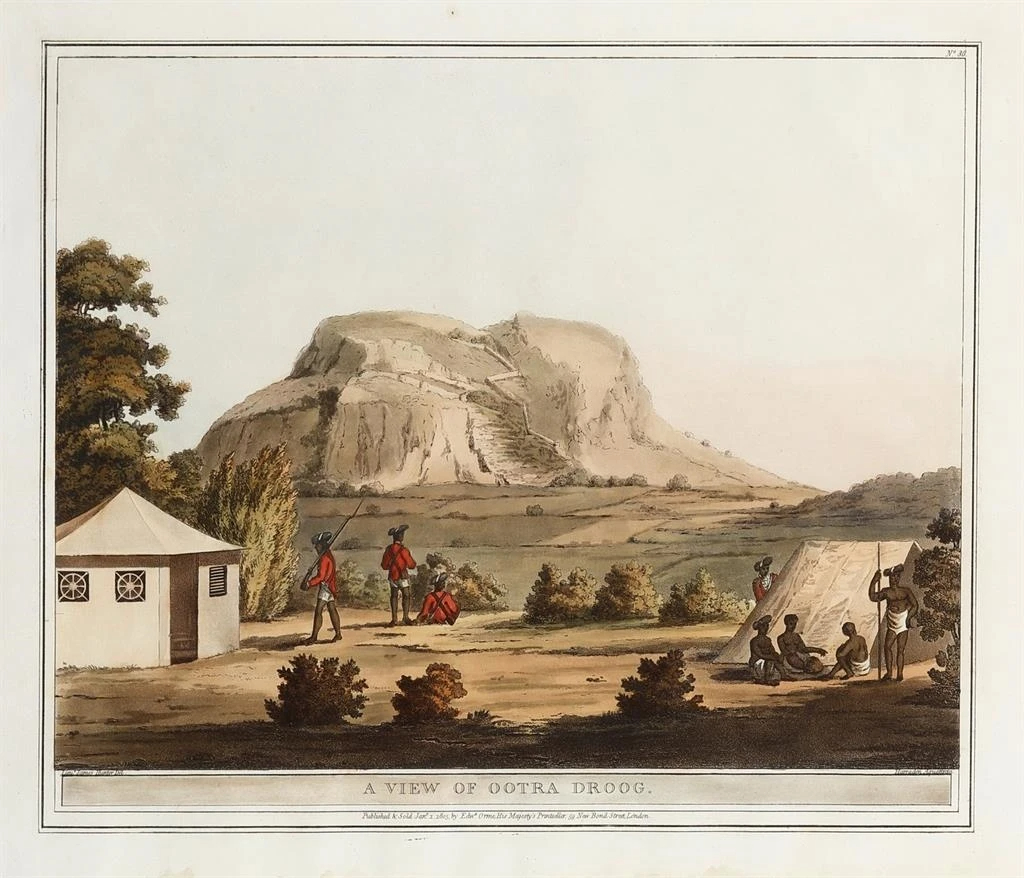
A view of Ootra Droog, ca. 1792 by James Hunter

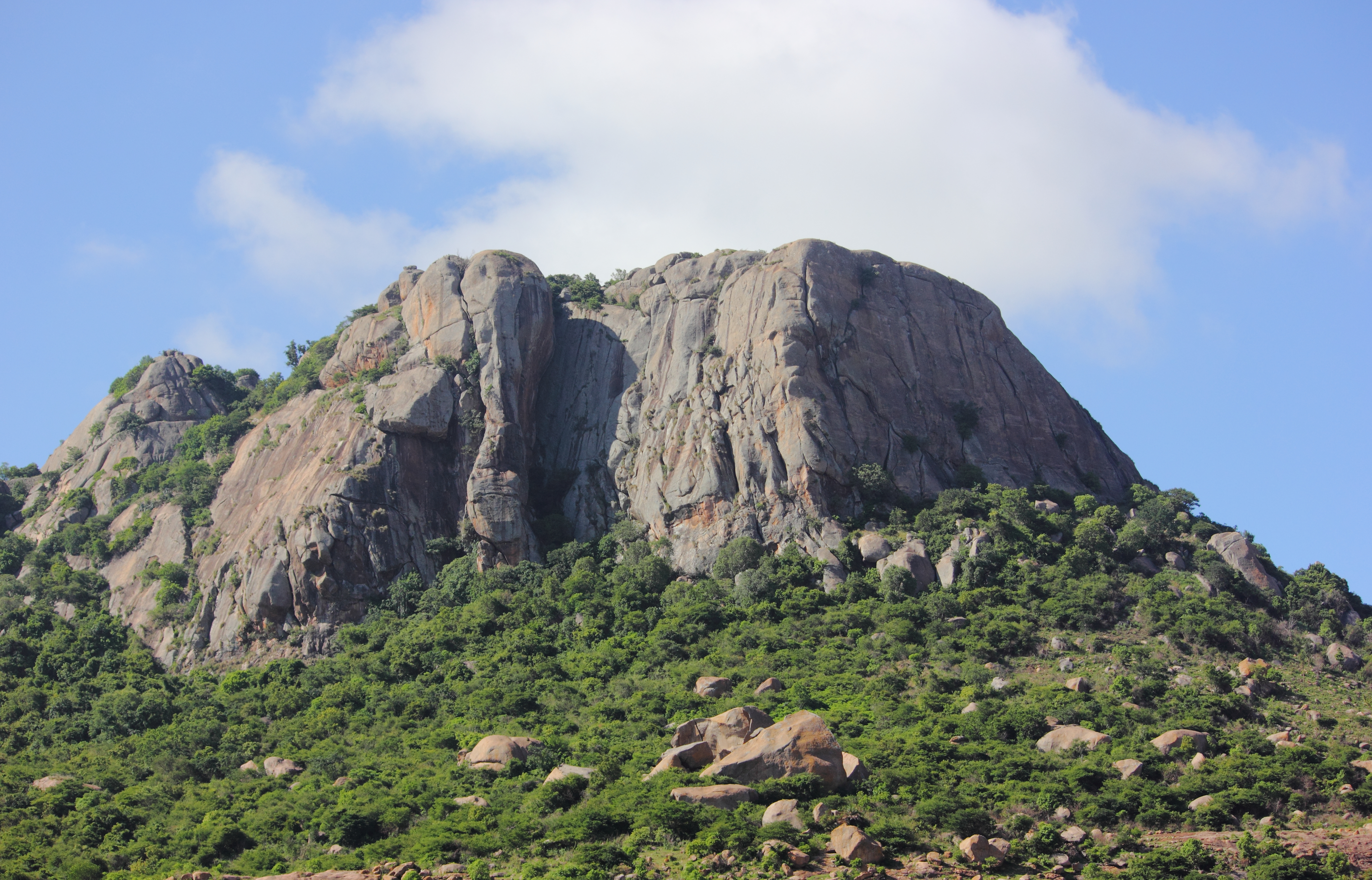
Hutridurga - long view

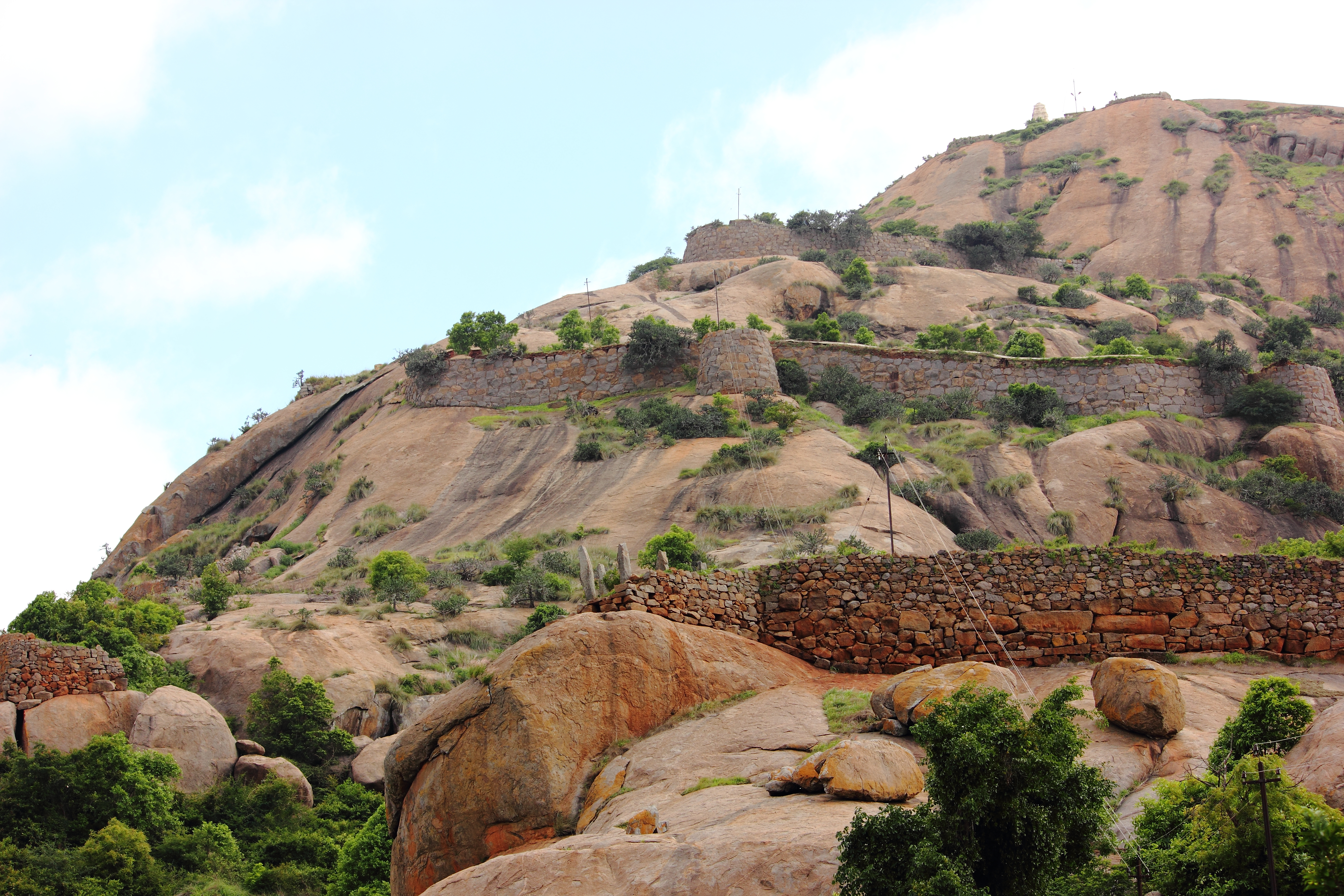
Uttari Betta

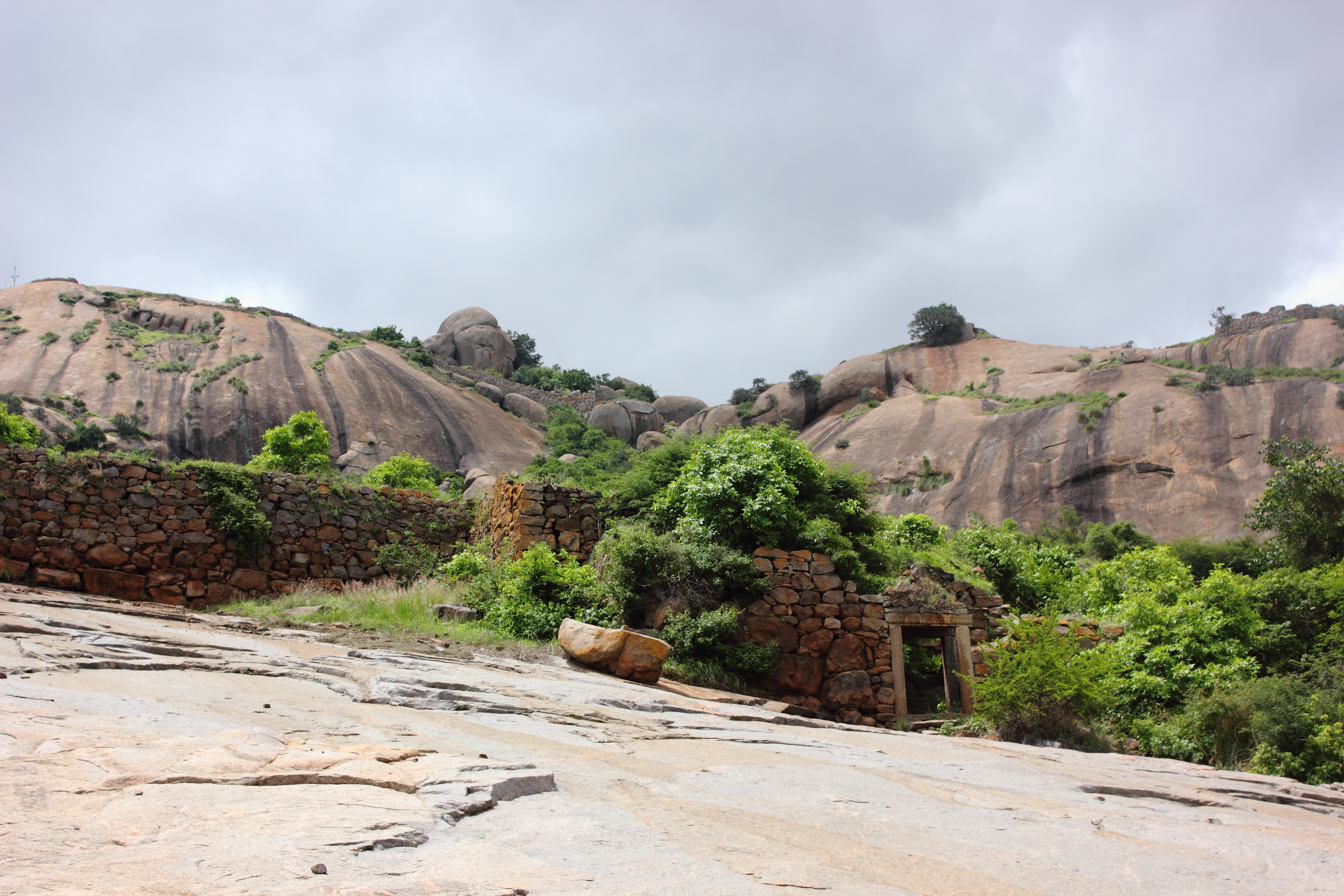
Hutridurga

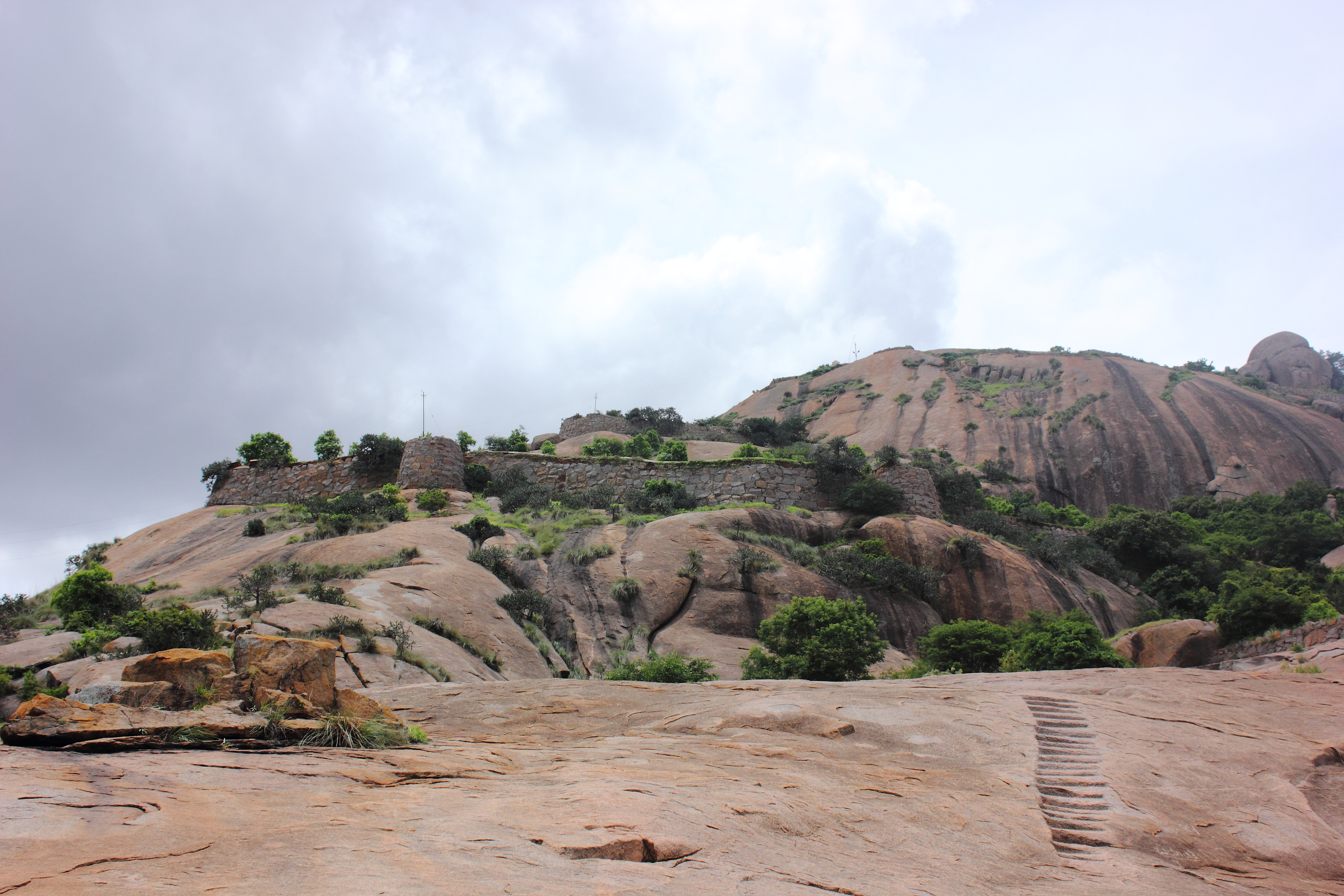
Uttari Betta

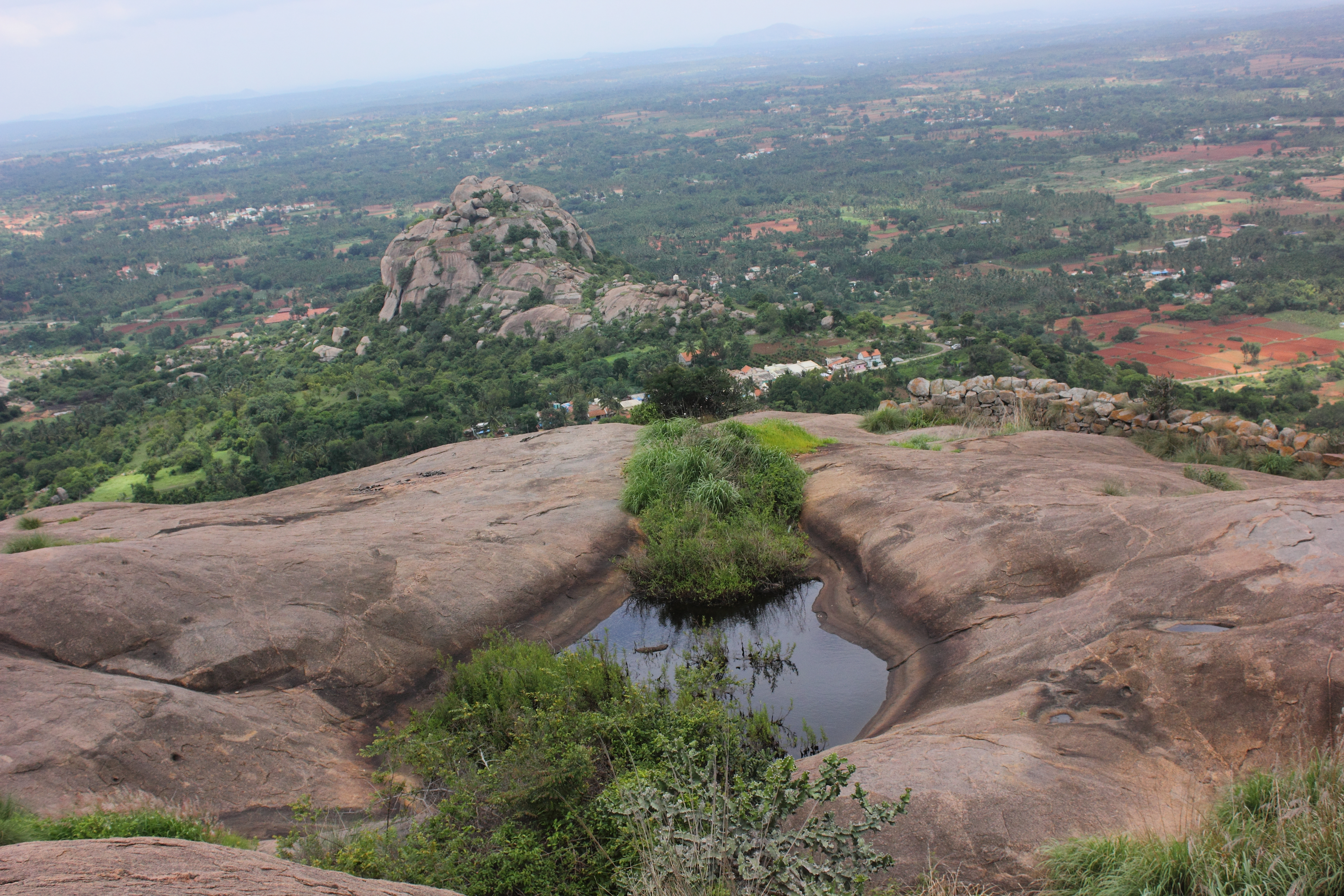
Hutridurga

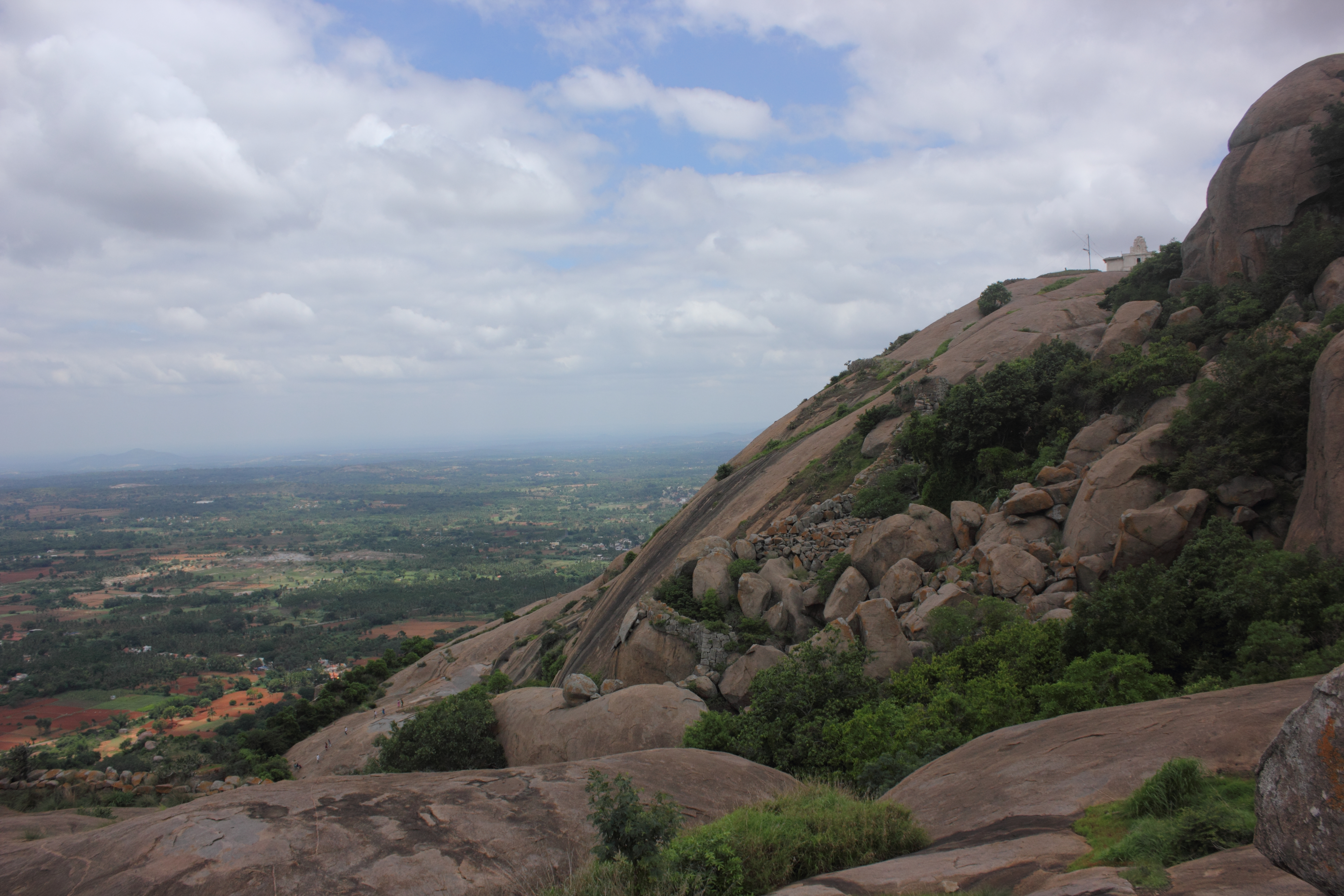
Hutridurga

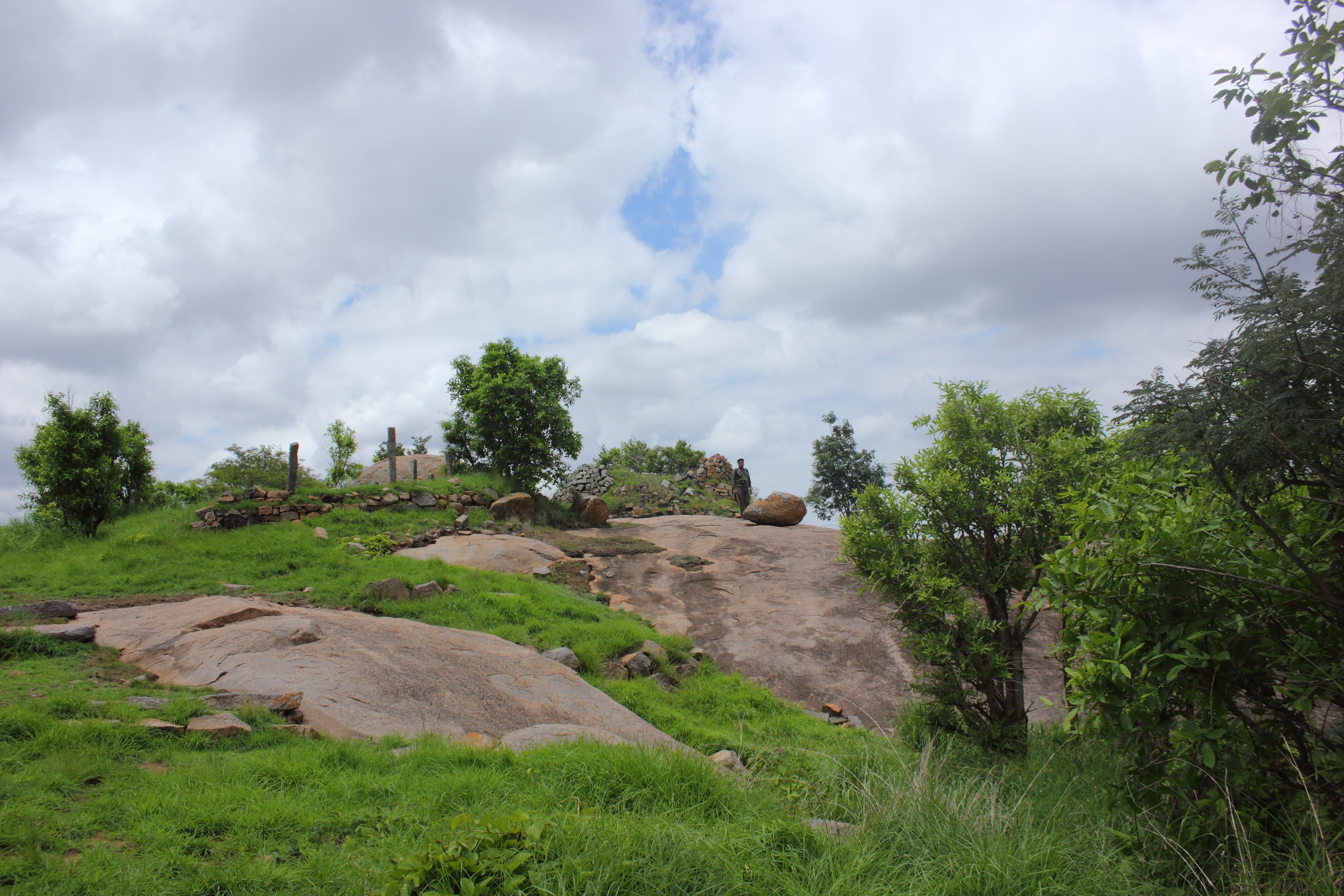
Hutridurga

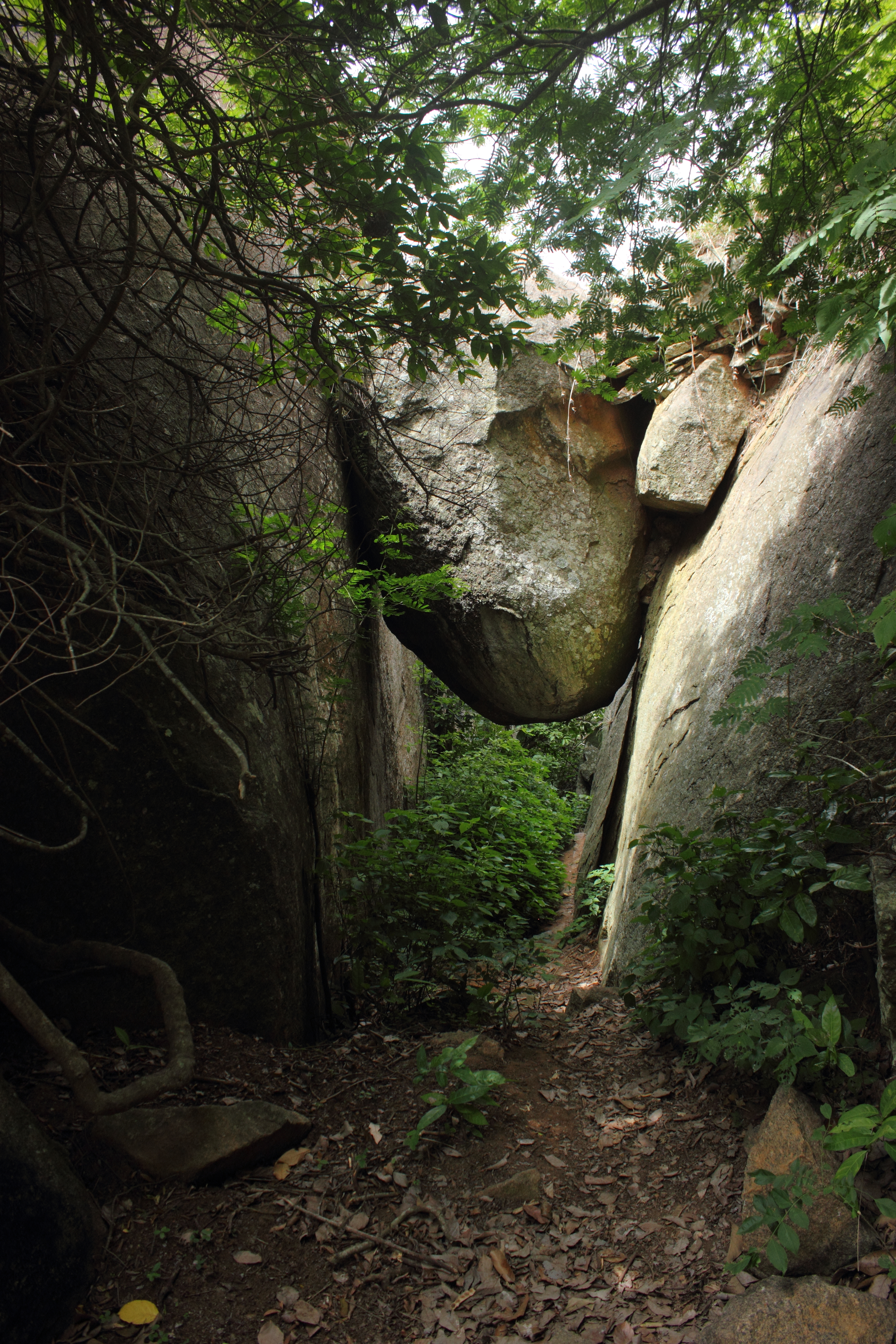
Uttari Betta

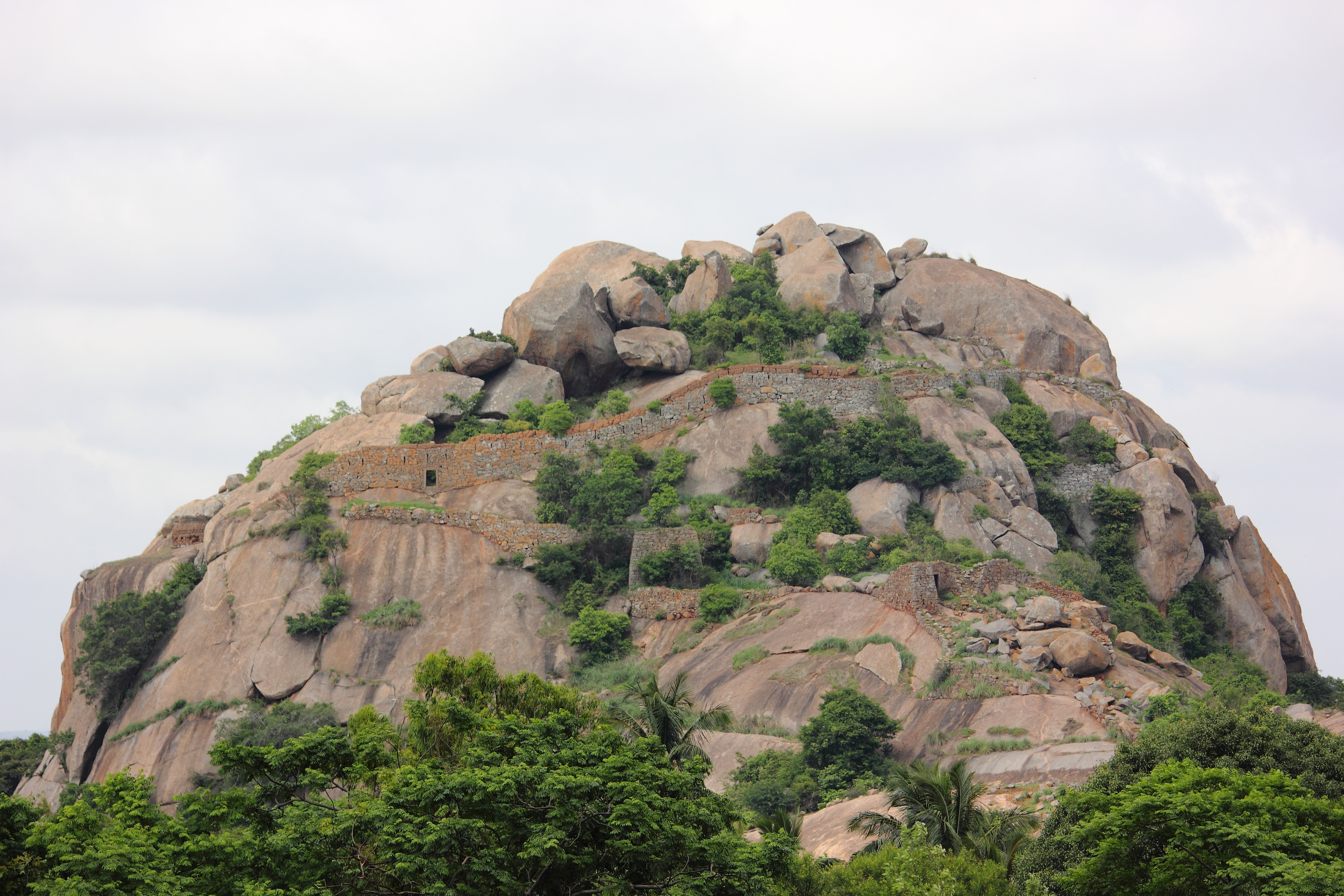
view of nearby fortified hill from Hutridurga

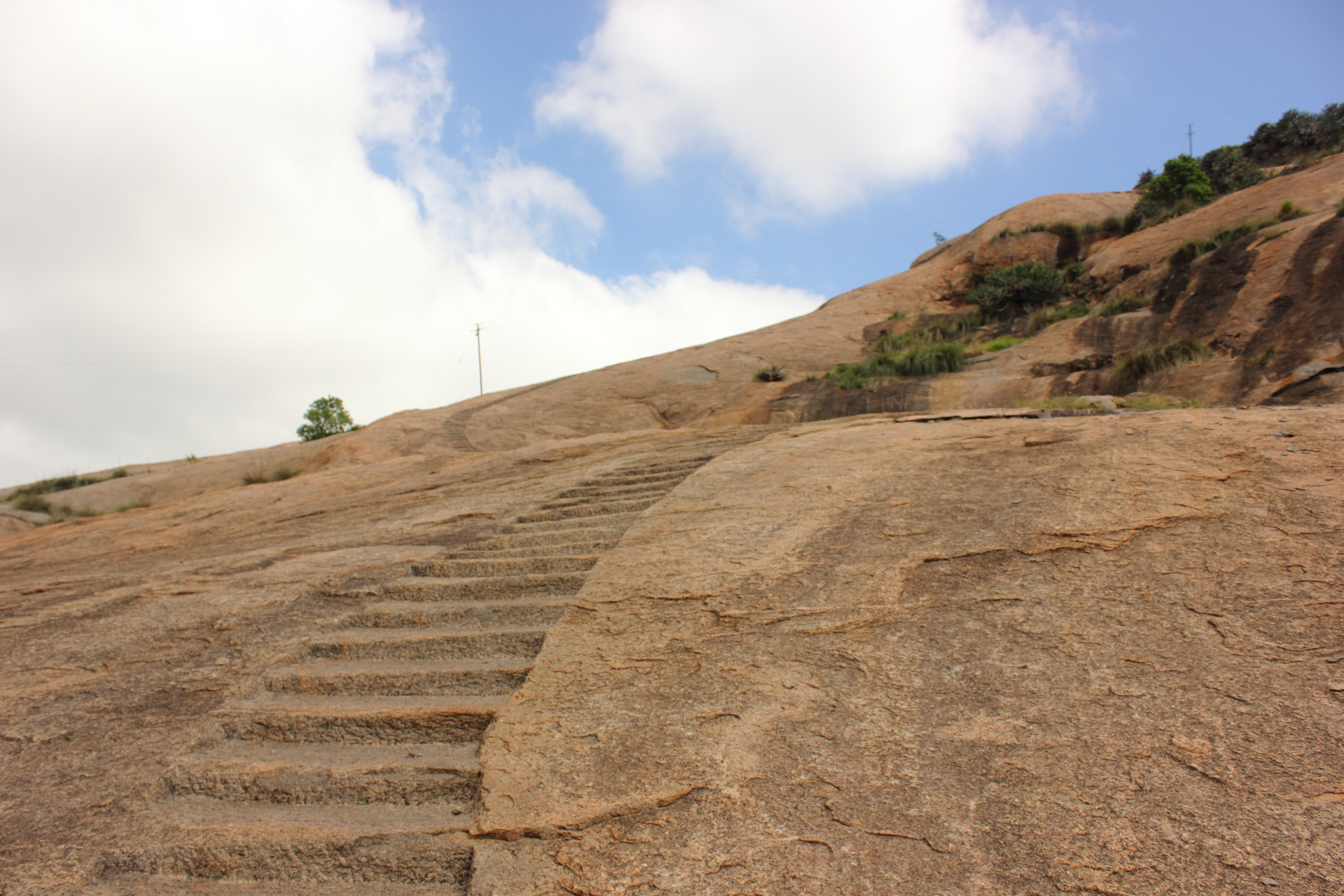
Uttari Betta

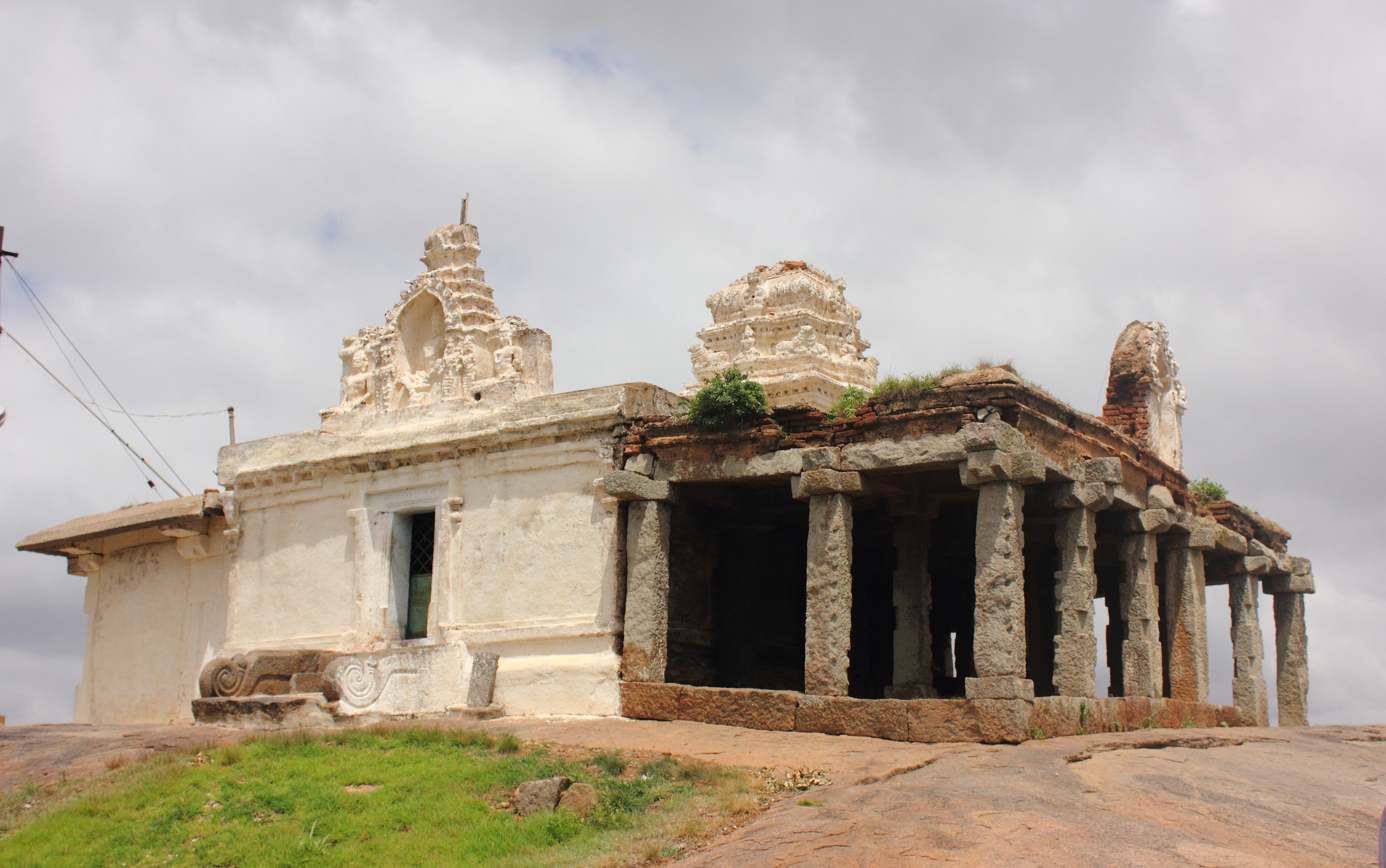
Hutridurga

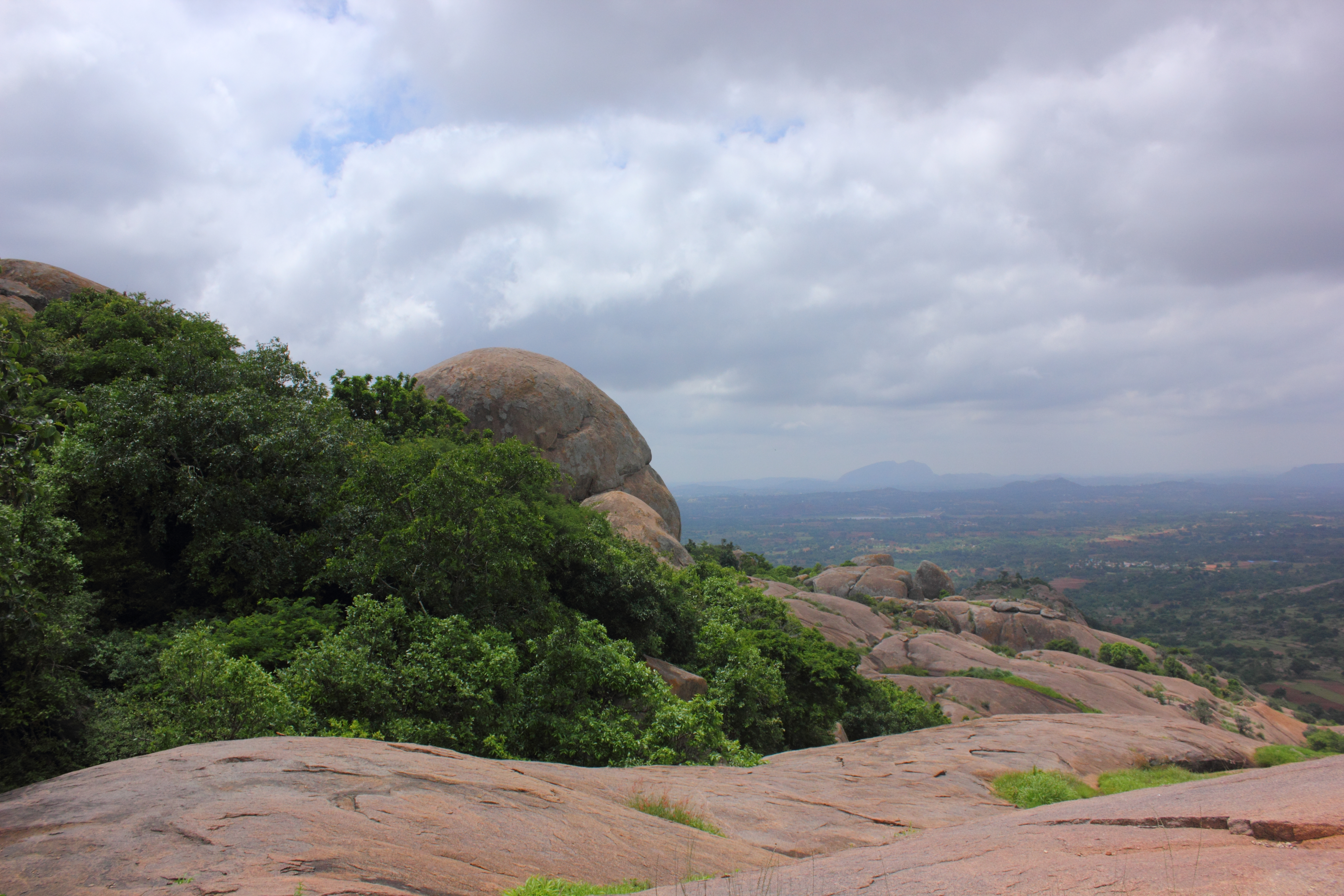
Hutridurga

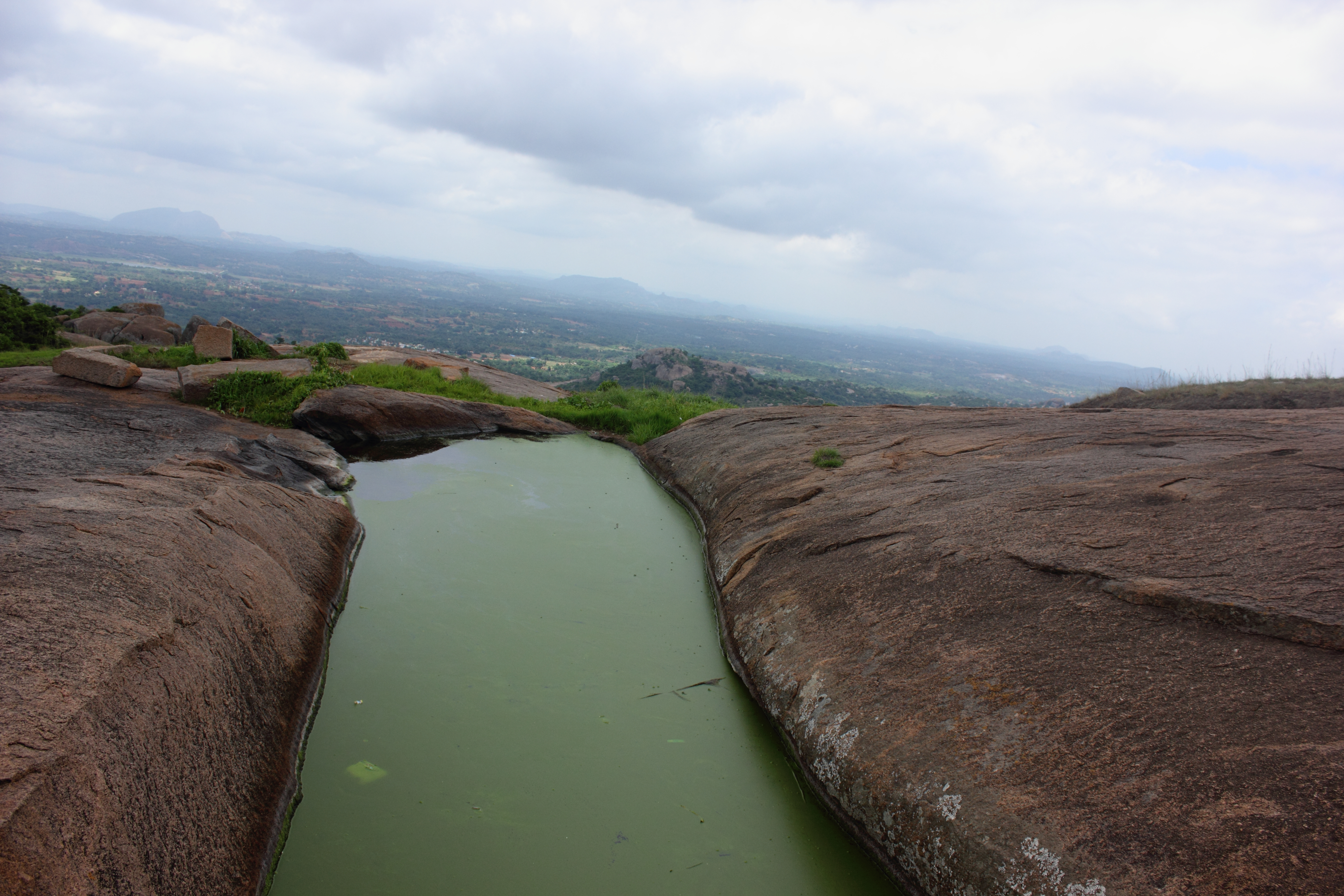
Uttari Betta

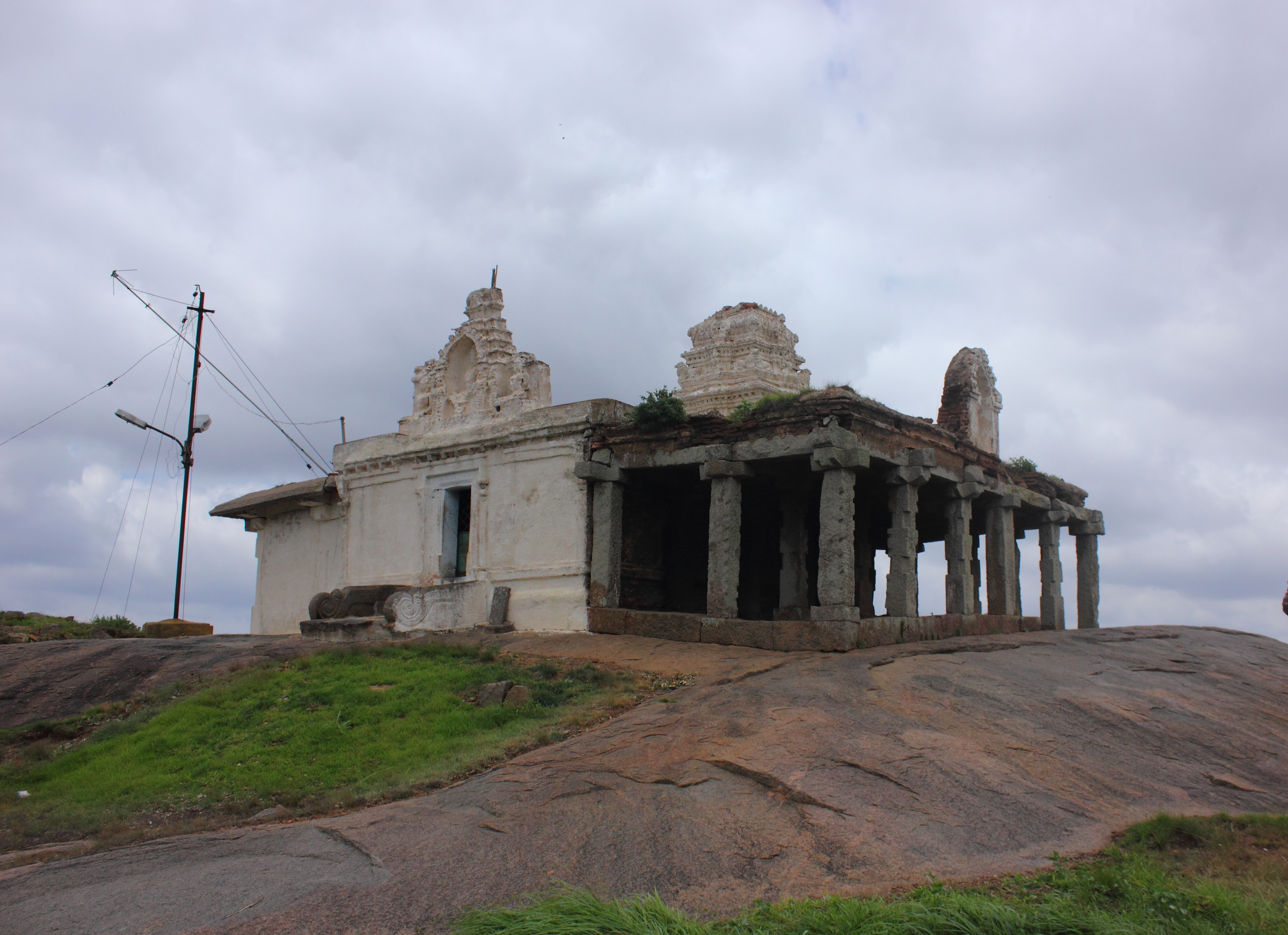
Hutridurga

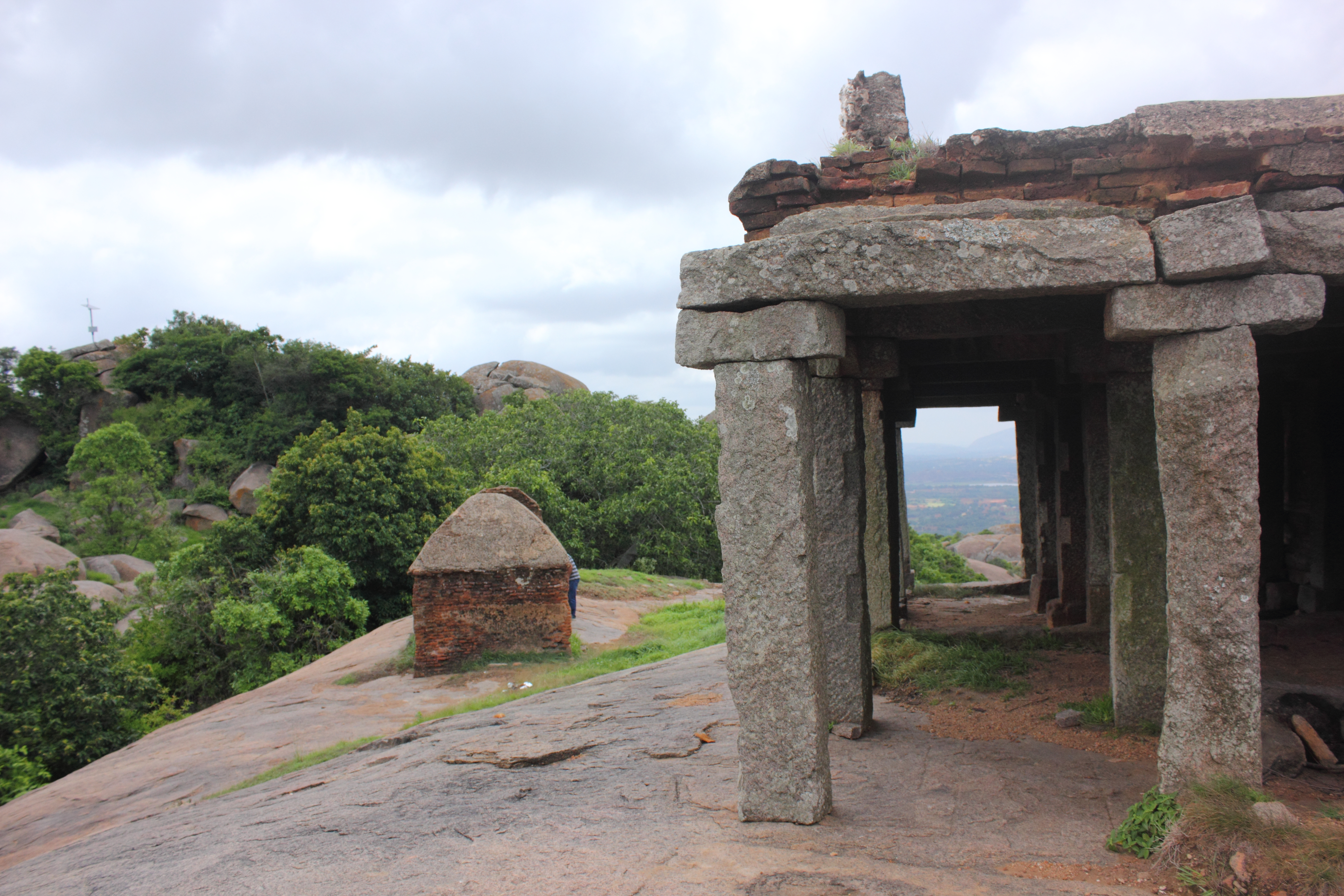
Uttari Betta

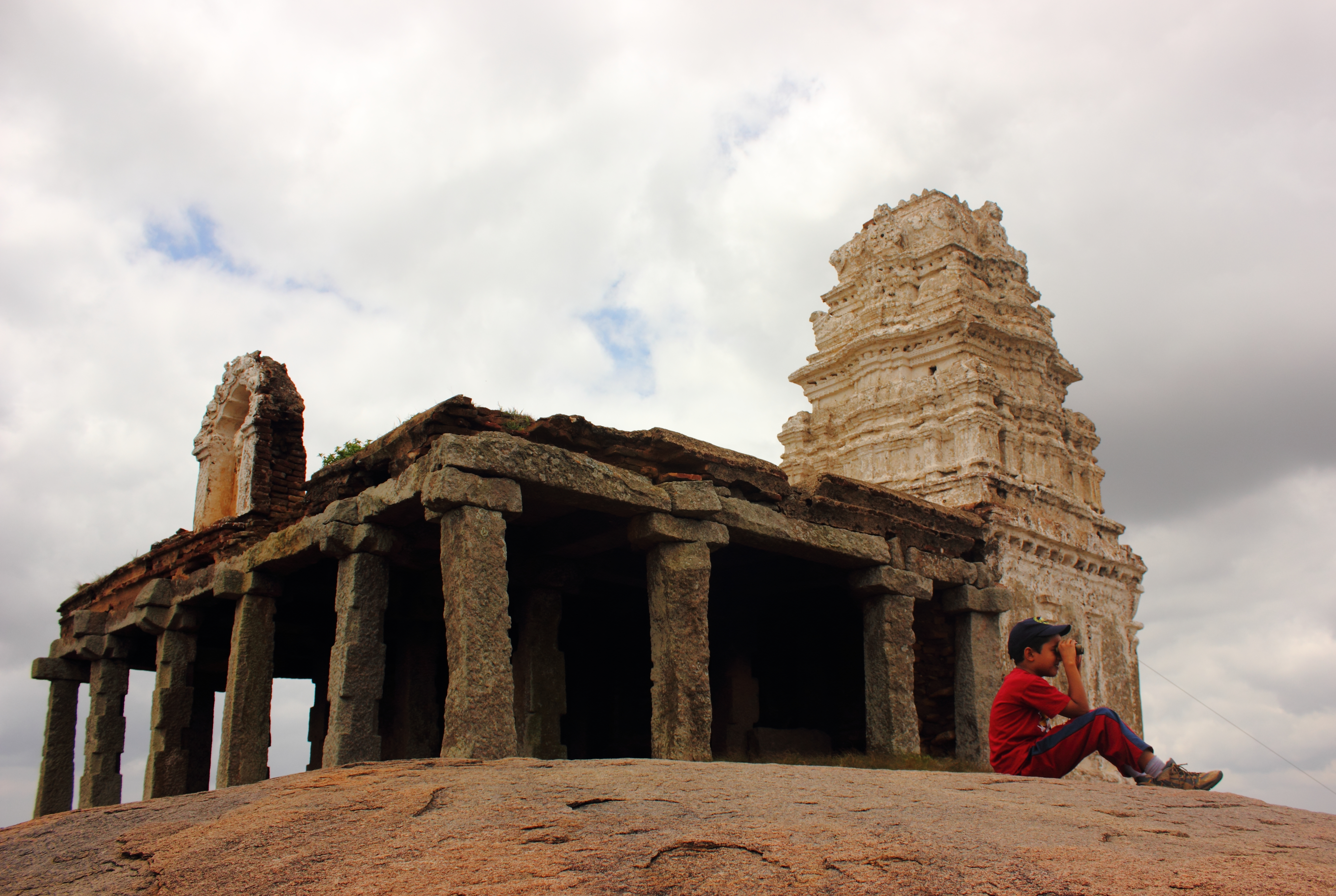
Hutridurga

== Bloglinks ==
Huthridurga Trek - Loapers

Save Huthridurga Fortress - by Summiters Adventures
