= Yediyur Siddhalingeshwara Swamy Temple =

Pilgrimage centre situated in Yedeyuru Village, India

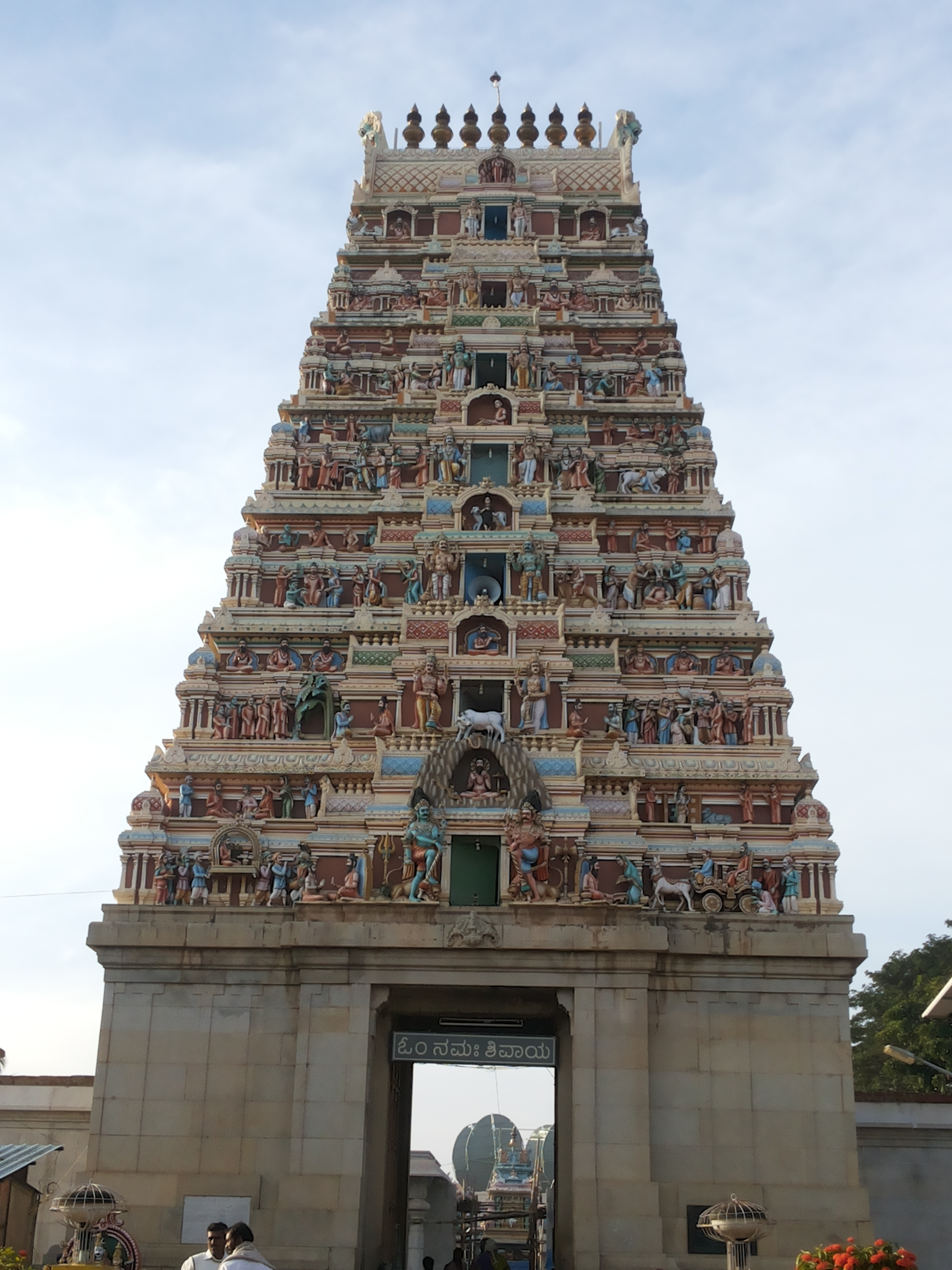
Yediyur Siddhalingeshwara Swamy Temple

Yediyuru Siddhalingeshwara Temple is a pilgrimage centre situated in Yedeyuru Village, Kunigal Town of the Indian state of Karnataka State.

It contains Nirvikalpa Shivayoga Samadhi of Tontada Siddalinga, a revered Lingayata Saint who flourished late in the 15th century.

The temple holds annual festivals during Maha Shivaratri and Ugadi.

On the 7th day of the Hindu calendar (Ugadi) Chaitra bahula saptami, jathre is performed to mark the attainment of the Samadhi of Sri Siddhalingeshwara. Every year on Maha Shivarathri, Sahasra Rudrabhisheka is performed. The Sahasra Kamala Pooja, Laksha Bilvarchane pooja is performed in the month of Shravana and Kumbhabhisheka is performed on each new moon day. During the annual festival of Deepavali (festival of lights) Laksha Deepotsava is performed by illuminating the temple with oil lamps as per Hindu tradition. The temple has a large wooden chariot (ratha). The festival is held on the 7th lunar day of the bright fortnight of Chaitra Masa (March–April).

== Sources ==
- Yediyur Temples :Yediyur Temples
- Website
- Karnataka Tourist Paradise (A handbook of Karnataka) gazetteer.kar.nic.in/data/gazetteer/postind/Kar_Handbook_2005_Chapter14.Pdf -
- South India Handbook, The Travel Guide books.google.co.in/books?ISBN 1900949814...
