= List of conservation reserves in India =

List

Conservation Reserves are the legally protected areas which act as a buffer zone or connectors or migratory corridors between two ecologically separated wildlife habitats to avoid fragmentation. The wildlife conserves are declared by the state government in official gazette. The state government after consultation with the local communities can declare any land adjacent to National Park or sanctuaries or linking two protected areas which is owned by the government as conservation reserve under the section 36A of The Wildlife Protection Act, 1972.

== Bihar ==
Name	Declared	Area (km²)	District
Gogabil	2019	0.30	Katihar
Bhaluni Dham	2021	0.12	Rohtas

== Gujarat ==
Name	Declared	Area (km²)	District
Chharidhandh Conservation Reserve	2008	227	Kutch district

== Haryana ==
Name	Declared	Area (km²)	District
Bir Bara Ban Conservation Reserve	2007	4.19	Jind district
Saraswati Plantation Conservation Reserve	2007	44.53	Kaithal district

== Himachal Pradesh ==
Name	Declared	Area (km²)	District
Darlaghat Conservation Reserve	2013	0.67	Solan
Naina Devi Conservation Reserve	2013	17.01	Bilaspur
Potter Hill Conservation Reserve	2008	2.24	Shimla
Shilli Conservation Reserve	2013	1.49	Solan

== Karnataka ==
Name	Declared	Area (km²)	District
Ankasamudra Birds conservation reserve	2017	0.99	Vijayanagara
Banakapur Peacock conservation reserve	9 June 2006	0.56	Haveri
Basur Amrut Mahal Kaval conservation reserve	2011	7.36	Chikkamagaluru
Bedthi conservation reserve	31 May 2011	57.307	Uttara Kannada
Bonal Bird conservation reserve	2011	2.738	Yadgir
Chikkasangama Bird conservation reserve	2022	116.38	Bagalkot
Hornbill conservation reserve	31 May 2011	52.50	Uttara Kannada
Kolara Leaf Nosed Bat conservation reserve	2019	0.9	Kolar
Mydhanahalli (Jayamangali BlackBuck) conservation reserve	February 2007	3.23	Tumkur
Magadikere conservation reserve	2015	0.50	Gadag
Melapura Bee Eater Bird conservation reserve	2015	0.03	Mandya
Mundige Lake and Bird conservation reserve	2022	1.66	Uttara Kannada
Puttenahalli Lake Birds conservation reserve	2015	0.15	Bengaluru Urban
Shalmale Riparian Biosystem conservation reserve	June 2012	4.89	Uttara Kannada
Thimalpura conservation reserve	2016	17.38	Tumkur
Thungabhadra Otter conservation reserve	2015	20	Ballari, Koppal
Ummanthur conservation reserve	2017	6.08	Chamarajanagar
Greater Hesaraghatta Conservation Reserve	25 February 2025	22.98	Bengaluru Urban

== Jammu & Kashmir ==
Name	Declared	Area (km²)	District
Achabal	2008	0.5	Anantnag district
Ajas			Bandipore district
Bahu			Jammu district
Brain-Nishat			Srinagar district
Chatlam Pampore Wetland			Pulwama district
Freshkhori Wetland			Pulwama district
Gambhir Mughlan Goral			Rajouri district
Gharana Wetland			
Hokera(Ramsar site) Wetland			
Hygam Wetland			
Jawahar Tunnel (Chakore Reserve)			
Khanagund/Hajin			
Kheri			
Khimber/Dara/Sharazbal			
Khonmoh			
Khrew			
Kranchoo Wetland			
Kukarian Wetland			
Kulian			
Malgam Wetland			
Manibaugh Wetland			
Mirgund Wetland			
Naganari			
Nanga Wetland			
Narkara Wetland			
Pargwal Wetland			
Sangral-Asachak Wetland			
Shallabaugh Wetland			
Sudhmahadev			
Thein Wetland			
Wangat/Chatrgul or Wangath			
Zaloora Harwan			

== Ladakh ==
Name	Declared	Area (km²)	District
Boodh Karbu conservation reserve	2008	12	Kargil
Kanji conservation reserve	2008	100	Leh
Norrichain Wetland (Tsokar) conservation reserve	2008	2	Leh
Sabu conservation reserve	2008	15	Leh
Tsomoriri Wetland conservation reserve	2008	120	Leh

== Lakshadweep ==
Name	Declared	Area (km²)	District
Attakoya Thangal Marine Reserve	February 2020	344	Lakshadweep
Dr. K. K. Mohammed Koya Sea Cucumber Conservation Reserve	27 February 2020	239	Lakshadweep
P.M. Sayeed Marine Birds Conservation Reserve	2020	62	Lakshadweep

== Maharashtra ==
Name	Declared	Area (km²)
Alaldari	2022	100.56
Amboli–Dodamarg	2021	56.92
Anjneri	2017	5.69
Atpadi	2023	9.49
Bhor	2022	28.44
Bhorgad	2008	3.49
Chandgad	2021	225.24
Chivatibari	2022	66.04
Dare Khurd (Mahadare)	2022	1.07
Igatpuri	2022	88.49
Jor–Jambhali	2021	65.11
Kalwan	2022	84.12
Kolamarka	2013	180.72
Mahendri	2021	67.82
Mamdapur	2014	54.46
Masai Pathar	2022	5.34
Mayani Bird	2021	8.67
Mogarkasa–Mangarli	2022	103.92
Muktai Bhavani	2014	122.74
Muniya	2021	96.01
Muragad	2022	42.87
Panhalgad	2021	72.90
Raigad	2022	47.62
Roha	2023	27.30
Tilari	2020	29.53
Toranmal	2016	93.42
Trimbakeshwar	2022	96.97
Vishalgad	2021	92.96

== Punjab ==
Name	Declared	Area (km²)	District
Beas River Conservation Reserve	2017	64.289	Hoshiarpur, Amritsar, Gurdaspur
Kali Bein Conservation Reserve	2019	2.10	Kapurthala
Rakh Sarai Amanat Khan Conservation Reserve	2010	4.95	Amritsar
Ranjit Sagar Dam Conservation Reserve	2017	18.45	Gurdaspur
Ropar Wetland Conservation Reserve	2017	2.108	Rupnagar

== Rajasthan ==
Conservation reserves in Rajasthan
Sanctuary	Declared	Area (km^{2})	District	Primary species
Aasop conservation reserve	2024	1.18	Bhilwara district	Blackbuck
Amrakh Mahadev Leopad conservation reserve	2023	71.47	Udaipur	Indian leopard
Baghdarrah Crocodile conservation reserve	2022	3.69	Udaipur district	Mugger crocodile
Baleshwar conservation reserve	2023	22.17	Sikar district	Indian leopard
Banjh Amli conservation reserve	2023	14.63	Baran district	
Bansiyal Khetri Bagore conservation reserve	2018	39.66	Jhunjhunu district	
Bansiyal Khetri conservation reserve	2017	70.18	Jhunjhunu district	Indian leopard
Beed Fatehpur conservation reserve	2023	30.34	Sikar district	
Beed Jhunjhunu conservation reserve	2012	10.47	Jhunjhunu district	Blackbuck
Beed Muhana A conservation reserve	2023	2.07	Jaipur district	
Beed Muhana B conservation reserve	2023	0.1	Jaipur district	
Beed Ghaas Phuliakhurd conservation reserve	2022	0.86	Bhilwara district	lesser florican
Bisalpur conservation reserve	2008	48.31	Tonk district	
Buchara Main conservation reserve	2025	44.38	Kotputli-Behror district	
Ganga Bherav Ghati conservation reserve	2023	39.51	Ajmer district	Indian leopard
Gogelao conservation reserve	2012	3.58	Nagaur district	
Gudha Vishnoiyan conservation reserve	2011	2.32	Jodhpur district	
Hamirgarh conservation reserve	2023	5.66	Bhilwara district	
Jawai Bandh Leopard II conservation reserve	2018	61.98	Pali district	Indian leopard
Jawai Bandh Leopard conservation reserve	2013	19.79	Pali district	Indian leopard
Jhalana-Amagarh conservation reserve	2023	35.07	Jaipur district	Indian leopard
Jorbeed Gadhwala conservation reserve	2008	56.47	Bikaner district	Vulture
Kharmor conservation reserve	2023	9.31	Ajmer district	Lesser florican
Khejarli Kallan conservation reserve	2025	1.5	Jodhpur district	
Kurjan conservation reserve	2023	2.92	Phalodi district	Demoiselle crane
Mahseer conservation reserve	2023	2.06	Udaipur district	Mahseer
Mansa Mata conservation reserve	2019	102.31	Jhunjhunu district	Indian leopard
Mokla Parewar conservation reserve	2025	43.12	Jaisalmer district	
Ramgarh conservation reserve	2023	38.09	Baran district	
Rankhar conservation reserve	2022	72.88	Jalore district	Indian wild ass
Rotu conservation reserve	2012	0.73	Nagaur district	
Shahabad Talheti conservation reserve	2022	178.84	Baran district	
Shahbad conservation reserve	2022	189.39	Baran district	
Shakambhari conservation reserve	2012	131	Sikar district	
Sorsan I conservation reserve	2023	16.11	Baran district	Lesser florican
Sorsan II conservation reserve	2023	4.27	Baran district	Lesser florican
Sorsan III conservation reserve	2023	0.76	Baran district	Lesser florican
Sundhamata conservation reserve	2008	117.49	Jalore district, Sirohi district	Sloth bear
Ummedganj Pakshi Vihar conservation reserve	2012	2.73	Kota district	
Wadakheda conservation reserve	2022	43.31	Sirohi district	

== Sikkim ==
Name	Declared	Area (km²)	District
Sling Dong Fairreanum Orchid Conservation Reserve	2008	0.06	Namchi (South Sikkim)

== Tamil Nadu ==
Name	Declared	Area (km²)	District
Dugong Conservation Reserve (Palk Bay)	21 September 2022	448	Thanjavur, Pudukkottai
Tiruvidaimarudur Conservation Reserve	14 February 2005	0.0284	Thanjavur
Suchindram–Theroor–Manakudi Conservation Reserve	19 March 2015	4.8392	Kanyakumari

== Tripura ==
Name	Declared	Area (km²)	District
Bhairabnagar Conservation Reserve	2022	12.93	South Tripura
Garjee Conservation Reserve	2021	25.28	South Tripura

== Uttarakhand ==
Name	Declared	Area (km²)	District
Asan Wetland Conservation Reserve	2005	4.444	Dehradun
Jhilmil Jheel Conservation Reserve	14 August 2005	37.83	Haridwar
Naina Devi Himalayan Bird Conservation Reserve	2015	111.92	Nainital
Pawalgarh Conservation Reserve	December 2012	58.25	Nainital

== West Bengal ==
Name	Declared	Area (km²)	District
Deul Conservation Reserve	19 May 2017	0.105	Purba Burdwan
Garpanchkot Conservation Reserve	19 May 2017	13.4034	Purulia
Hijli Conservation Reserve	19 May 2017	0.155	Paschim Medinipur
Mukutmanipur Conservation Reserve	19 May 2017	0.437	Bankura
Tekonia Conservation Reserve	19 May 2017	0.0587	Cooch Behar
