= Conservation reserves and community reserves of India =

Type of protected area in India

Conservation reserves and community reserves in India are terms denoting protected areas of India which typically act as buffer zones to or connectors and migration corridors between established national parks, wildlife sanctuaries and reserved and protected forests of India. Such areas are designated as conservation areas if they are uninhabited and completely owned by the Government of India but used for subsistence by communities, and community areas if part of the lands are privately owned. Administration of such reserves would be through local people and local agencies like the gram panchayat, as in the case of communal forests. (See Communal forests of India)

Community reserves are the first instances of private land being accorded protection under the Indian legislature. It opens up the possibility of communally owned for-profit wildlife resorts, and also causes privately held areas under non-profit organizations like land trusts to be given protection. (See Private protected areas of India)

These protected area categories were first introduced in the Wildlife (Protection) Amendment Act of 2002 − the amendment to the Wildlife Protection Act of 1972. These categories were added because of reduced protection in and around existing or proposed protected areas due to private ownership of land, and land use. A case in point was the Melghat Tiger Reserve where a large area was left unprotected due to private ownership.

Amendments to the Wild life protection act in 2003, provided a mechanism for recognition and legal backing to the community initiated efforts in wildlife protection. It provides a flexible system to achieve wildlife conservation without compromising community needs. Tiruvidaimarudur Conservation Reserve, declared on February 14, 2005, is the First Conservation Reserve to be established in the country. It is an effort of a village community who wanted to protect the birds nesting in their village.

These categories roughly correspond to IUCN Category V (conservation reserves) and VI (community reserves) protected areas.

Tiruppadaimarathur conservation reserve near Thirunelveli District of Tamil Nadu, declared in 2005, is the first Conservation Reserve in the country.

In 2012, Rajasthan government in India declared "Jawai Bandh forests" as a conservation reserve forest. Jawai Bandh forest is situated in Pali district and it is in close proximity of Kumbalgarh Sanctuary.keshopur chamb gurdaspur (Punjab) conservation reserve India's first community reserve. Recently, Gogabeel, an ox-bow lake in Bihar’s Katihar district, has been declared as the state’s first ‘Community Reserve’. In 2020, the Indian government created the world's first sea cucumber reserve in Lakshadweep, the Dr. K.K. Mohammed Koya Sea Cucumber Conservation Reserve, the largest marine conservation reserve Attakoya Thangal Marine Reserve and the first protected area for marine birds in India - PM Sayeed Marine Birds Conservation Reserve in Lakshadweep UT.

Recently, Rankhar, a village situated in the Jalor district of Rajasthan, was declared a conservation reserve. It is the 16th conservation reserve of Rajasthan.

== See also ==
- Indian Council of Forestry Research and Education
- Protected areas of India
- Private protected areas of India
- Reserved forests and protected forests of India
- List of conservation reserves in India
