= Jhalana Amagarh leopard conservation reserve =

Protected area in Rajasthan, India

Jhalana–Amagarh Leopard Conservation Reserve
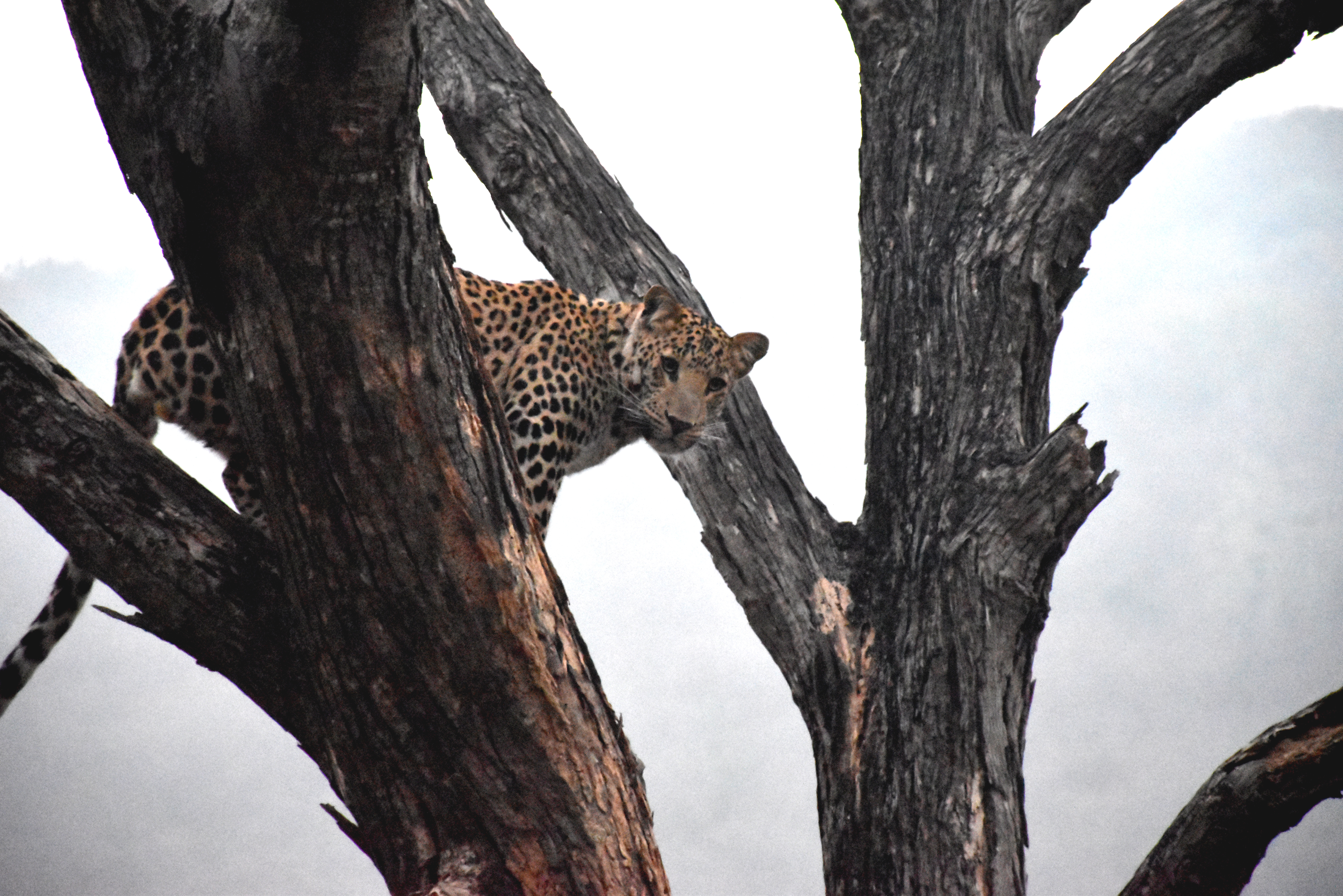
- Leopard in Jhalana Reserve, Jaipur

- Location within Rajasthan Location within India
- Interactive map of Jhalana–Amagarh Leopard Conservation Reserve
- Location: Jaipur, Rajasthan, India
- Nearest city: Jaipur
- Coordinates: 26.885°N 75.850°E
- Area: 3507.17 hectares (Jhalana: 20 square kilometers)
- Established: 2017 (Jhalana), 2022 (Amagarh)
- Governing body: Rajasthan Forest Department

Jhalana–Amagarh Leopard Conservation Reserve is a protected area located in Jaipur, Rajasthan, India. Comprising the Jhalana and Amagarh forests, the reserve is managed by the Rajasthan Forest Department.

== Geology ==
The conservation reserve made of the Jhalana and Amagarh forests, both located in and near Jaipur, with the Jhalana forest on the south side of the Jaipur-Agra national highway, bordering and at some points covering Jaipur and the Aravalli Range. The Amagarh forest contains a fort built by Sawai Jai Singh in the 1700s.

The conservation reserves covers approximately 36 km^{2} (8,900 acres). 20 km^{2} (4,900 acres) are in the Jhalana park and 15.24 km^{2} (3,770 acres).

== Ecology ==
The animal reserve contains civets, foxes, jackals, nilgai, rabbits, sambhar, and wild cats.

== History ==
In 2017, as part of Rajasthan state's Project Leopard, a section of forest near Jaipur, historically used for hunting by the Jaipur royal family and later for cattle grazing and firewood collecting, was set aside for leopard conservation and declared a forest reserve by the Rajasthan Forest Department. This was the Jhalana reserve, and it was the first leopard conservation reserve in India.

The Amagarh forest was opened in 2022. The following years, the Jhalana and Amagarh parks were jointly recognized as a conservation reserve, governed by the 1972 Wildlife Protection Act. It was the 21st conservation reserve in Rajasthan.

The total leopard population in the parks was 28 in 2019; by December 2022, the number of leopards in the parks had grown to 40, despite a park ranger's estimation that they could only support between ten and twelve leopards. The overpopulation led to an increase in human-leopard encounters in surrounding urban areas and some leopards entered human dwellings. Park officials responded by clearing land of invasive species in an attempt to increase the numbers of chital for leopards to feed on.

== See also ==
- Rajasthan Forest Department
- List of conservation reserves in India
