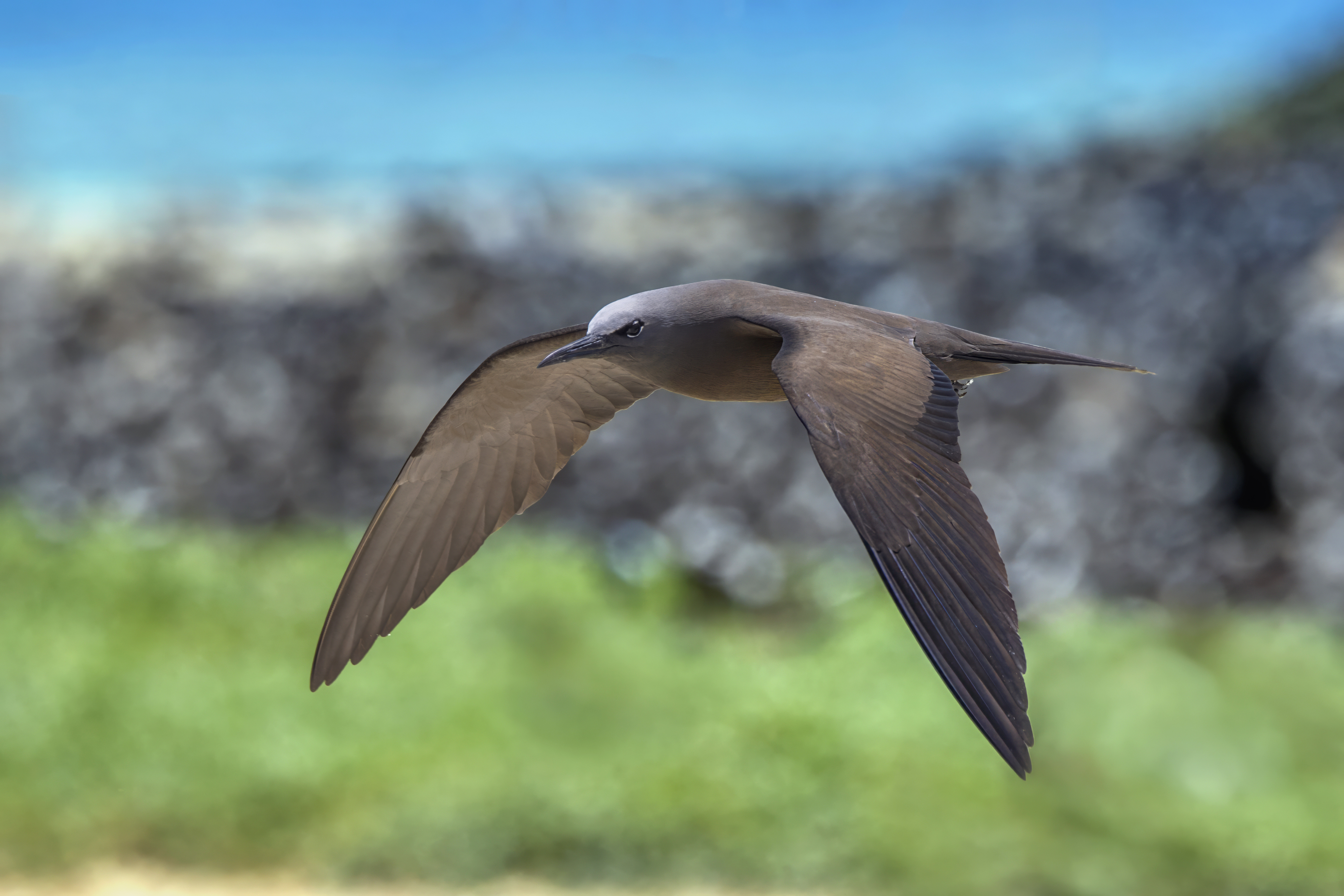
- Anous stolidus pileatus, Queensland Australia

Conservation status
- Least Concern (IUCN 3.1)

Scientific classification
- Kingdom: Animalia
- Phylum: Chordata
- Class: Aves
- Order: Charadriiformes
- Family: Laridae
- Genus: Anous
- Species: A. stolidus

Binomial name
- Anous stolidus (Linnaeus, 1758)

Synonyms
- Sterna stolida Linnaeus, 1758

= Brown noddy =

Species of bird

The brown noddy, common noddy or noddy tern (Anous stolidus) is a seabird in the family Laridae. The largest of the noddies, it can be told from the closely related black noddy by its larger size and plumage, which is dark brown rather than black. The brown noddy is a tropical seabird with a worldwide distribution, ranging from Hawaii to the Tuamotu Archipelago and Australia in the Pacific Ocean, from the Red Sea to the Seychelles and Australia in the Indian Ocean and in the Caribbean to Tristan da Cunha in the Atlantic Ocean. The brown noddy is colonial, usually nesting on elevated situations on cliffs or in short trees or shrubs. It only occasionally nests on the ground. A single egg is laid by the female of a pair each breeding season. In India, the brown noddy is protected in the PM Sayeed Marine Birds Conservation Reserve.

== Taxonomy ==
The first formal description of the brown noddy was by the Swedish naturalist Carl Linnaeus in 1758 in the tenth edition of his Systema Naturae under the binomial name Sterna stolida. The genus Anous was introduced by the English naturalist James Francis Stephens in 1826. The genus name Anous is Ancient Greek for "stupid" or "foolish". The specific name stolidus is Latin and also means "stupid" or "foolish".

Four subspecies are recognised:

- A. s. pileatus (Scopoli, 1786) – Red Sea, Indian Ocean east through the Pacific to Hawaii & Easter Island
- A. s. galapagensis Sharpe, 1879 – Galápagos Islands
- A. s. ridgwayi Anthony, 1898 – islands off western Mexico to Costa Rica
- A. s. stolidus (Linnaeus, 1758) – islands of the Caribbean and tropical Atlantic
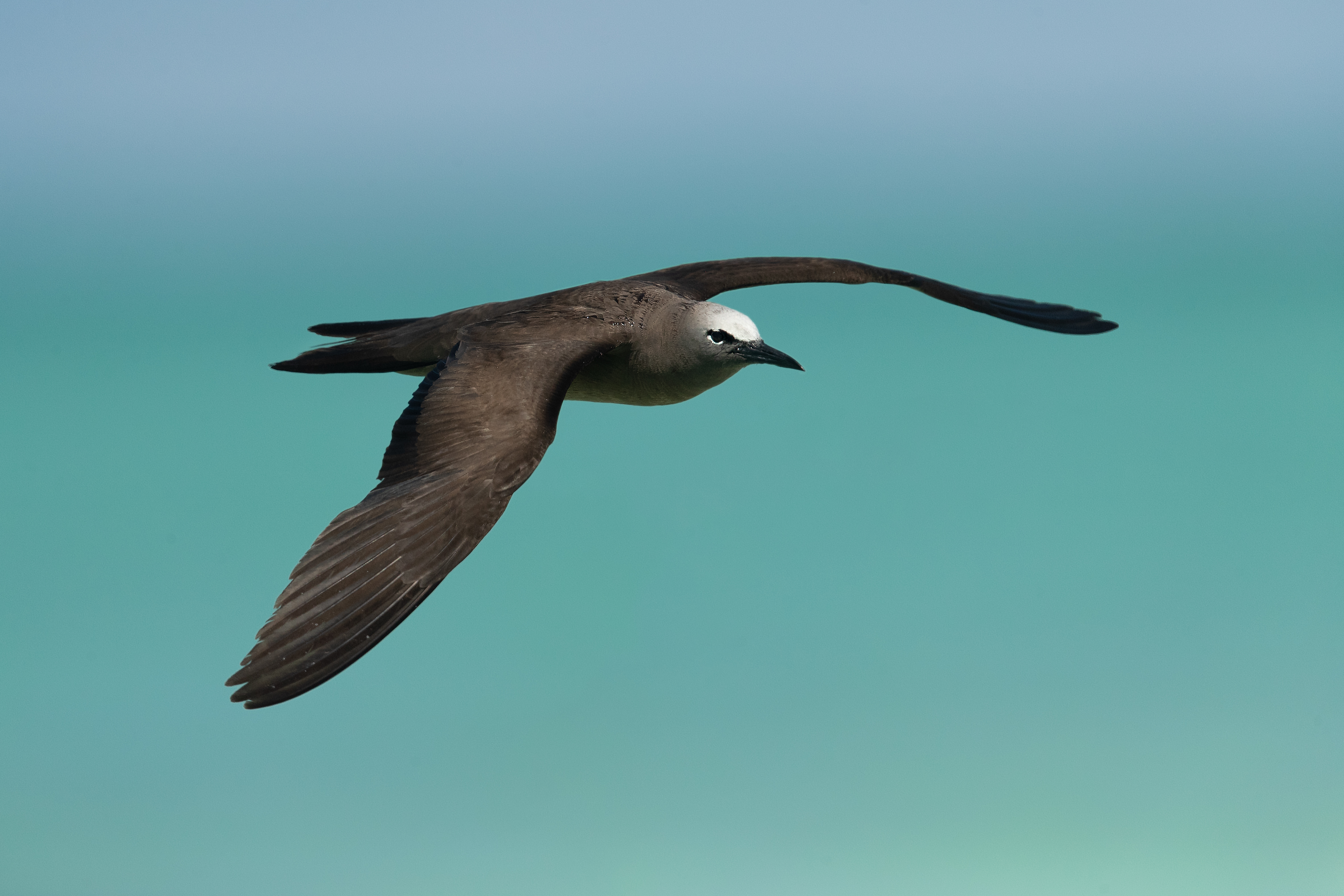
A. s. pileatus, Queensland, Australia

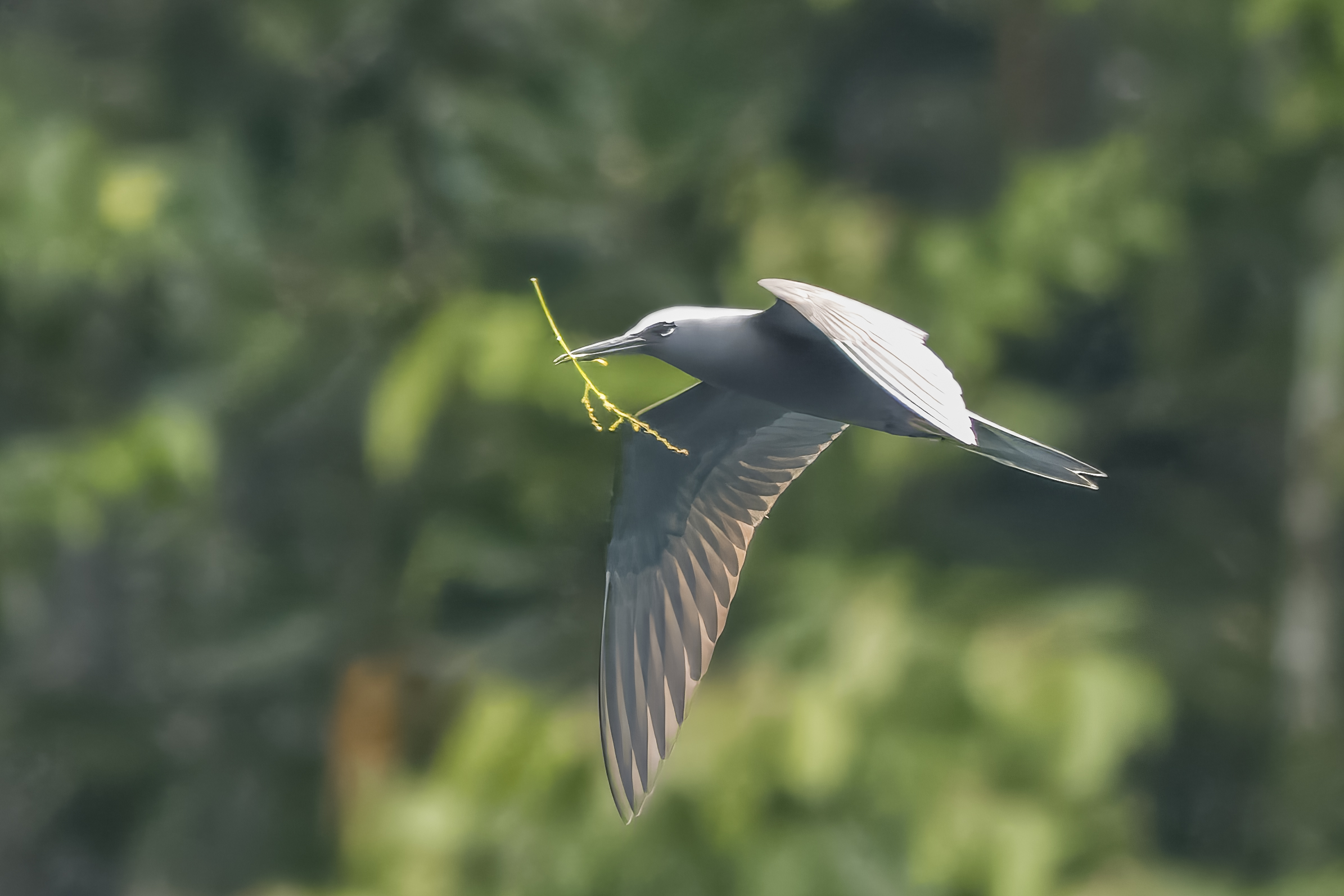
A. s. pileatus with nesting material, Palau

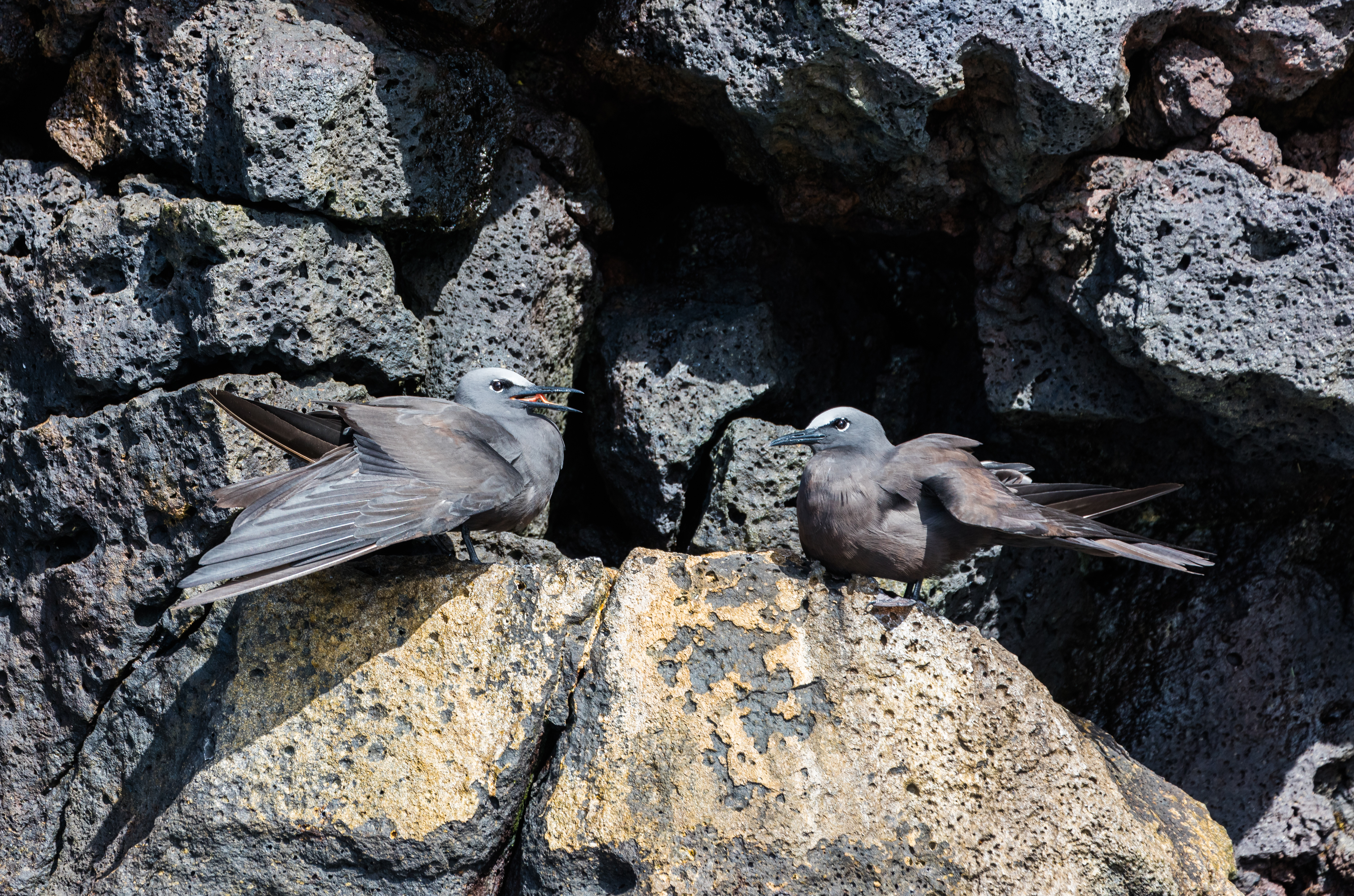
A. s. galapagensis, endemic to the Galápagos Islands, Ecuador

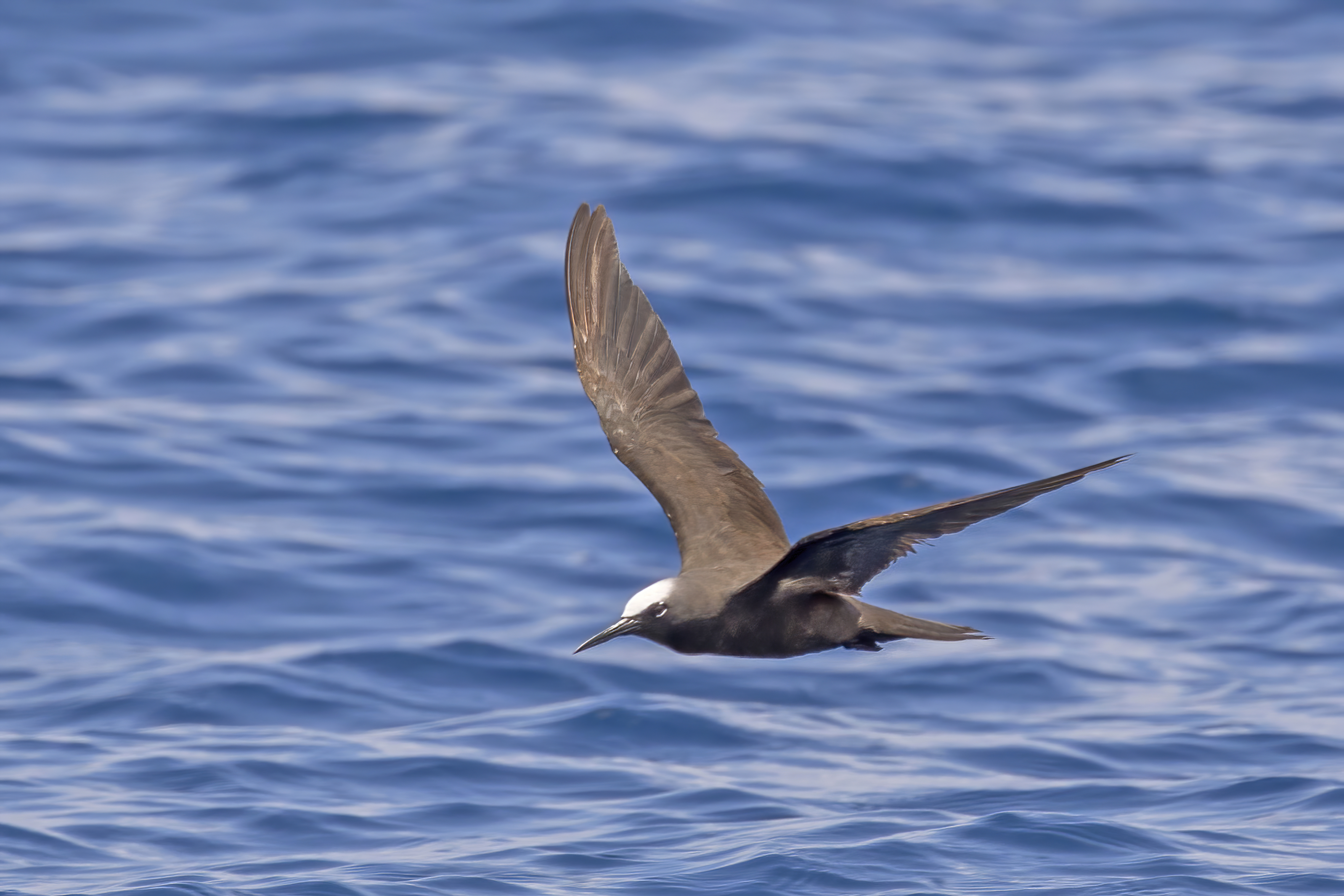
A. s. stolidus, São Tomé and Príncipe

== Description ==
The brown noddy is 38–45 cm (15–18 in) in length with a wingspan of 75–86 cm (30–34 in). The plumage is a dark chocolate-brown with a pale-grey or white crown and forehead. It has a narrow incomplete white eye-ring. The tail is long and wedge-shaped, and the feet and legs are dark.

== Behaviour ==
=== Breeding ===
The brown noddy is a colonial bird, usually nesting on cliffs, trees, or bushes. It occasionally lays its eggs on the bare ground. The nest itself is usually a platform nest, made of sticks and twigs.

In their nuptial displays, the female and male bow and nod to each other. Courtship feeding and flights accompany this, in addition to the transfer of a small, freshly caught fish from the male to the female.

This bird lays a clutch of one pink cream egg with lilac and chestnut maculation. The egg usually measures around 52 by 35 millimetres (2.0 by 1.4 in). This egg is incubated by both sexes for 33 to 36 days, with each parent incubating for one or two days while their mate is feeding at sea. After the chick hatches, it grows quickly; usually reaching the weight of the parents in three weeks. When it fledges, about six to seven weeks after hatching, it can sometimes weigh more than the parents, although this weight is lost quickly once it starts to fly. At this point, the fledgling is starting to rely on its parents less and less as it learns how to provide for itself.

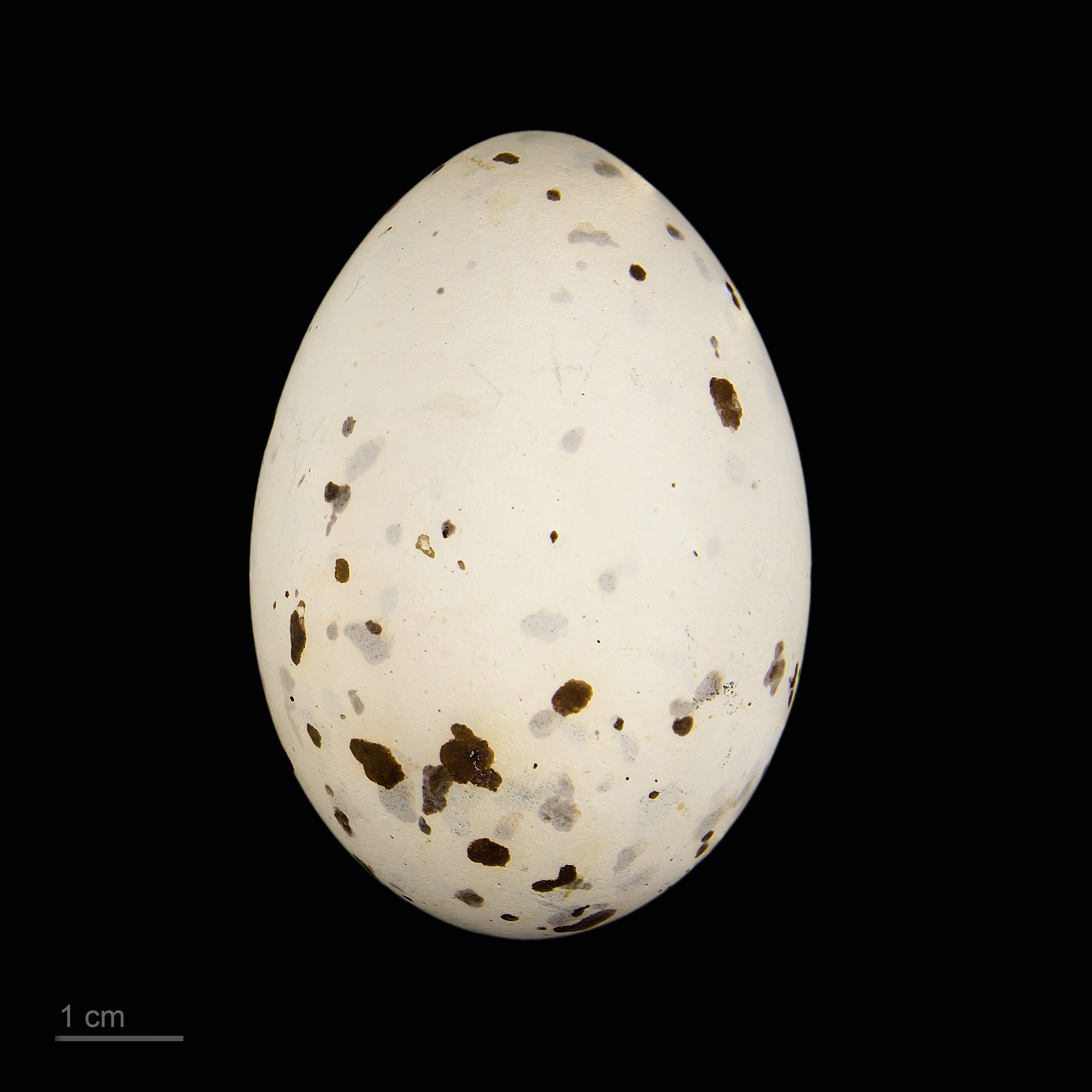
Egg

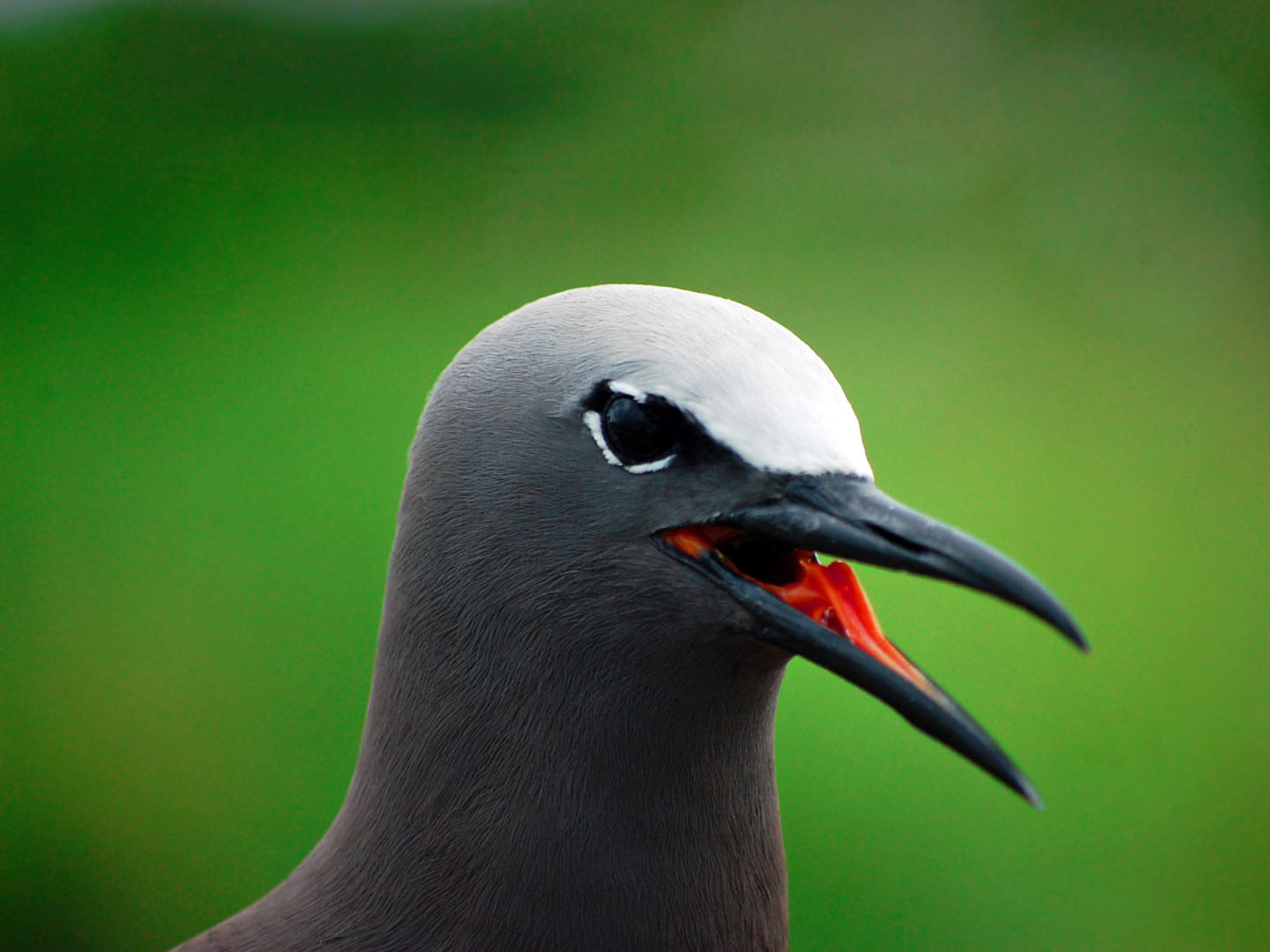
A. s. pileatus, Philippines

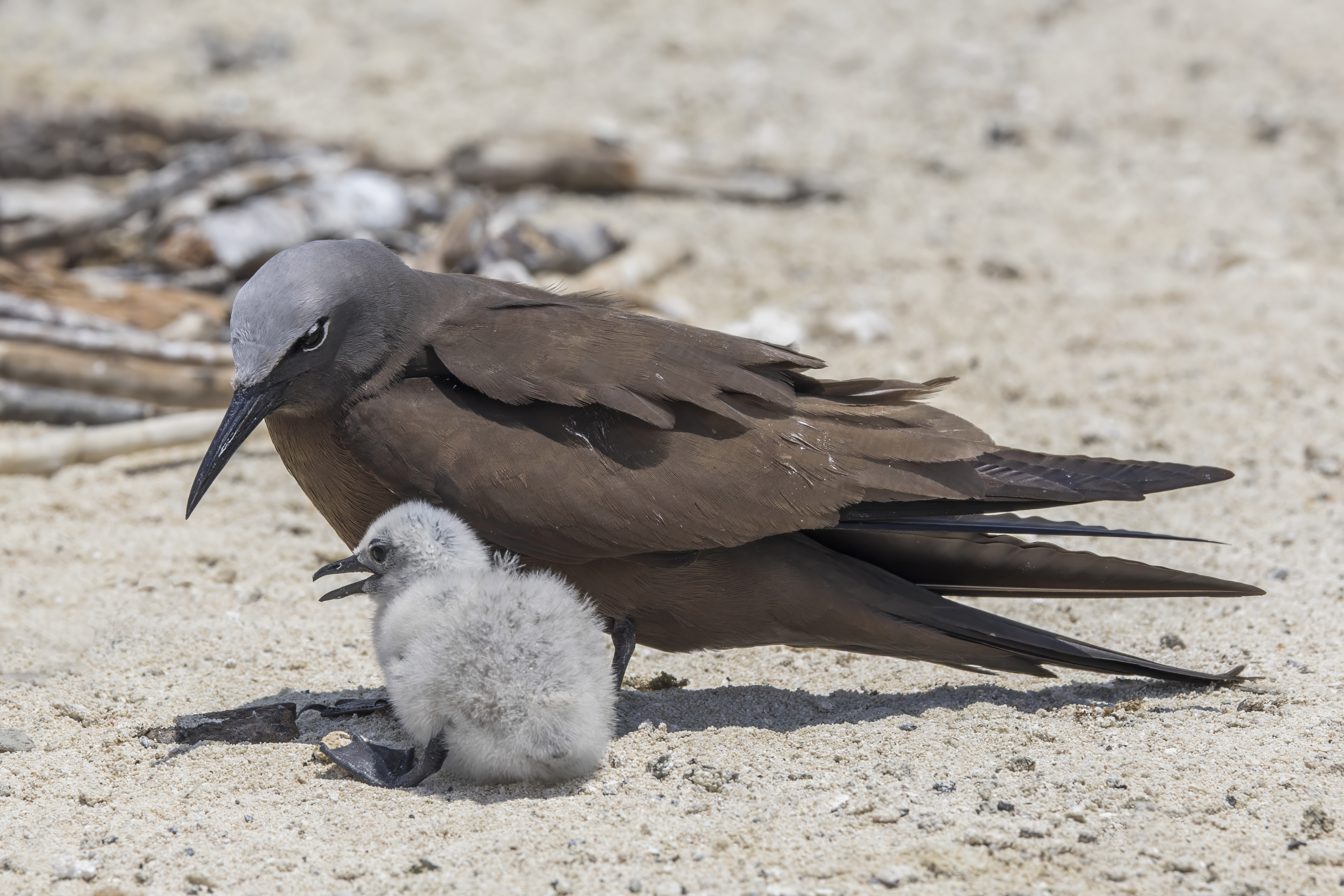
A. s. pileatus with chick

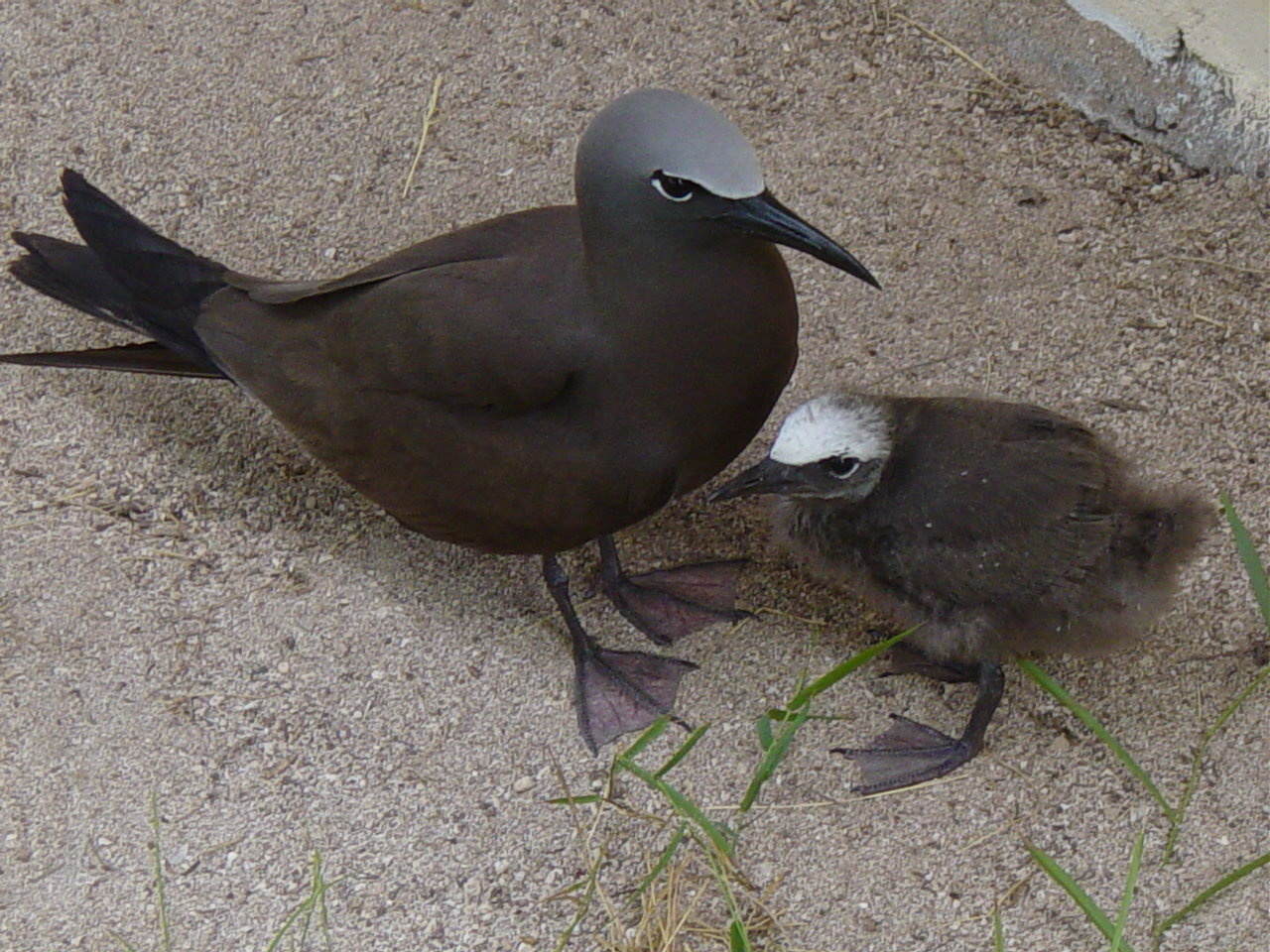
A. s. stolidus with chick

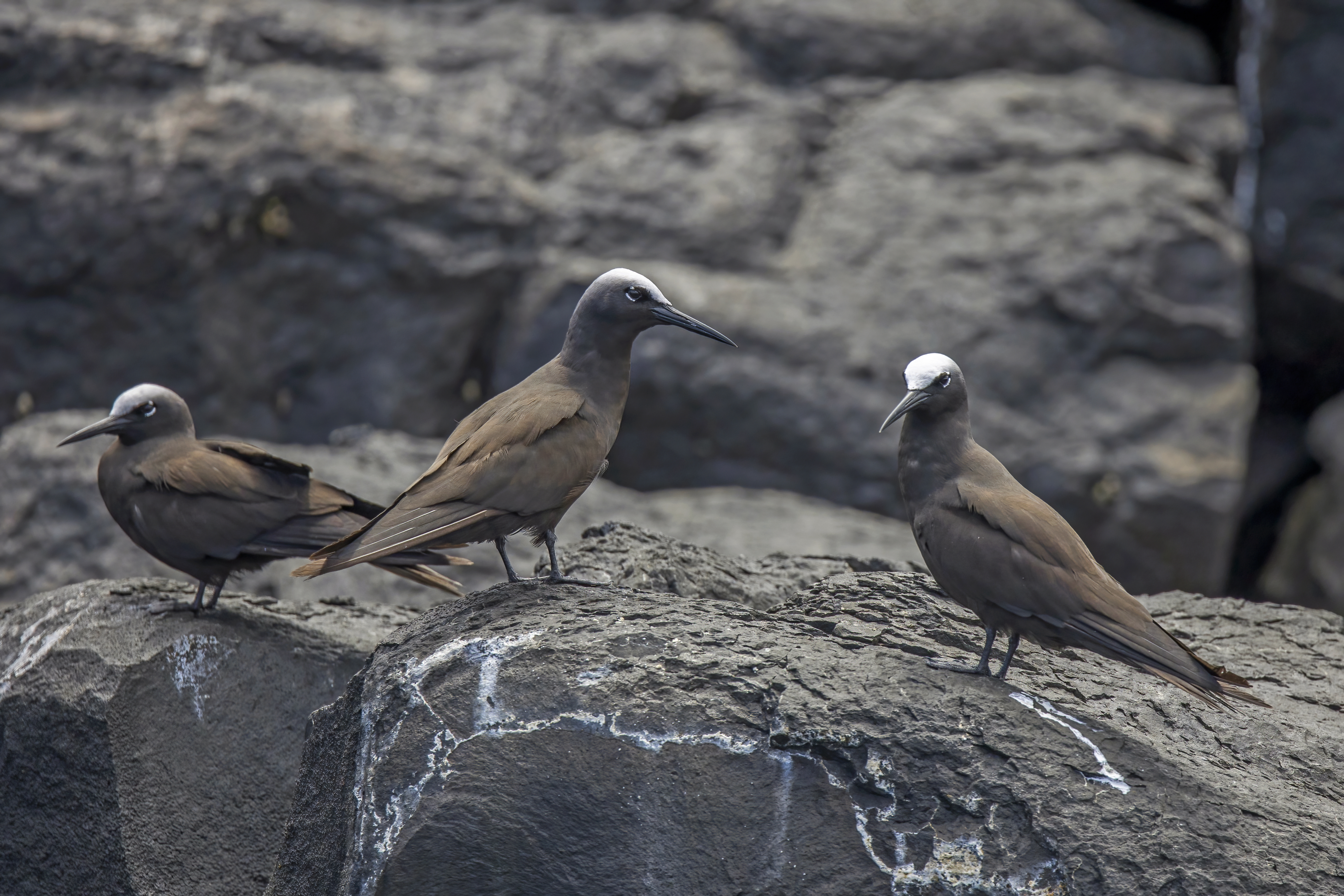
A. s. stolidus, São Tomé and Príncipe

=== Diet ===
The brown noddy forages by swooping over the water and dipping down to catch small squid, other molluscs, aquatic insects and fish (such as sardines, anchovies, etc.). It will also feed on fruit, mostly the screw pine fruit.

== Sources ==
- "National Geographic" Field Guide to the Birds of North America ISBN 0-7922-6877-6
- Harrison, P. Seabirds, an Identification Guide (1983) ISBN 0-7470-1410-8
- Sibley, D. A., National Audubon Society, The Sibley Guide to Birds ISBN 0-679-45122-6
- Chardine, J.W. and R.D. Morris. 1996. Brown Noddy (Anous stolidus). In: The Birds of North America, No. 220 (A. Poole and F. Gill, eds.). The Academy of Natural Sciences, Philadelphia, PA, and The American Ornithologists' Union, Washington, D.C.
- Brown, William Yancey (1973). Breeding Biology of the Sooty Tern and Brown Noddy on Manana or Rabbit Island, Hawaii. Ph.D. Dissertation, University of Hawaii.
