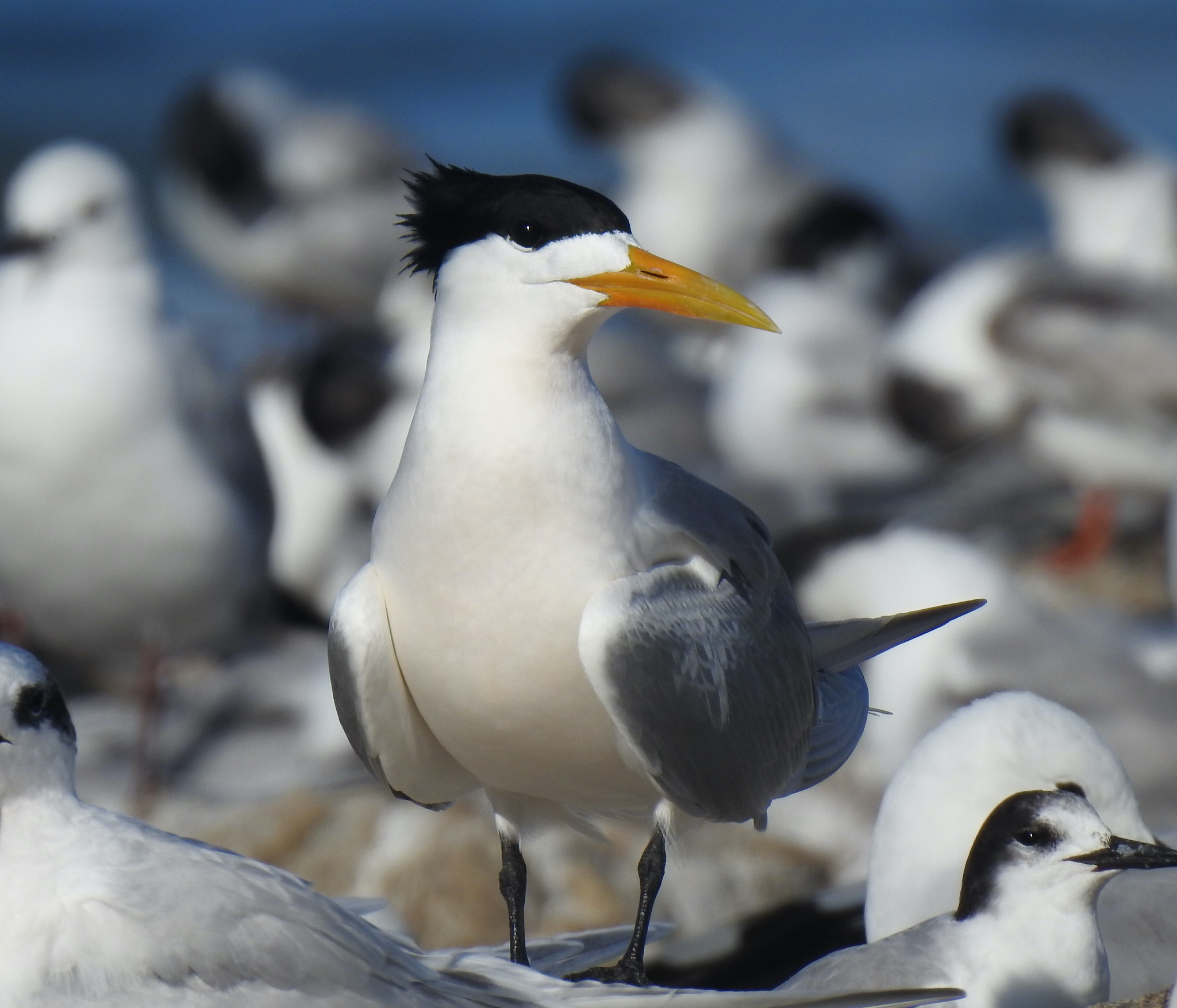
- Breeding plumage T. b. bergii, Gansbaai, South Africa

Conservation status
- Least Concern (IUCN 3.1)

Scientific classification
- Kingdom: Animalia
- Phylum: Chordata
- Class: Aves
- Order: Charadriiformes
- Family: Laridae
- Genus: Thalasseus
- Species: T. bergii

Binomial name
- Thalasseus bergii (Lichtenstein, MHC, 1823)
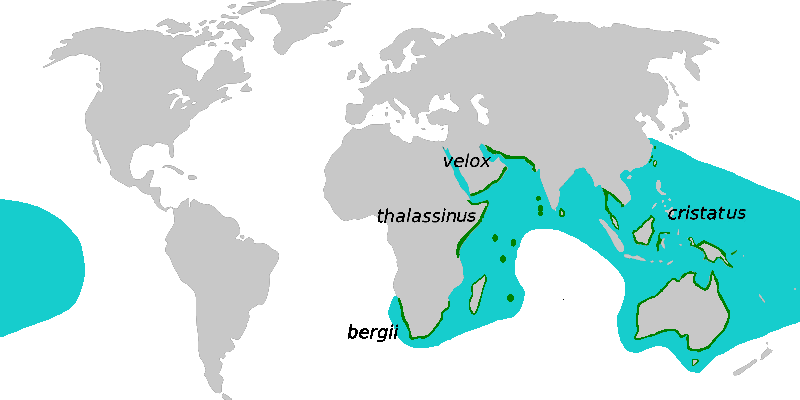
- Approximate breeding range Wintering range

Synonyms
- Sterna bergii Lichtenstein, 1823

= Greater crested tern =

Seabird in the family Laridae

The greater crested tern (Thalasseus bergii), also called crested tern, swift tern, or great crested tern, is a tern in the family Laridae that nests in dense colonies on coastlines and islands in the tropical and subtropical Old World. Its four or five subspecies breed in the area from South Africa around the Indian Ocean to the central Pacific and Australia, all populations dispersing widely from the breeding range after nesting. This large tern is closely related to other species in its genus, but can be distinguished by its darker, battleship-grey upperparts, white forehead even in full breeding plumage, and greenish-tinged yellow (not orange or black) bill colour.

The greater crested tern has dark grey upperparts, white underparts, a yellow bill, and a shaggy black crest that recedes in winter. Its young have a distinctive appearance, with strongly patterned grey, brown and white plumage, and rely on their parents for food for several months after they have fledged. Like all members of the genus Thalasseus, the greater crested tern feeds by plunge diving for fish, usually in marine environments; the male offers fish to the female as part of the courtship ritual.

This is an adaptable species that has learned to follow fishing boats for jettisoned bycatch, and to use unusual nest sites such as the roofs of buildings and artificial islands in salt pans and sewage works. Its eggs and young are taken by gulls and ibises, and human activities such as fishing, shooting and egg harvesting have caused local population declines. There are no global conservation concerns for this bird, which has a stable total population of more than 500,000 individuals.

== Taxonomy ==
The terns, subfamily Sterninae, are small to medium-sized seabirds closely related to the gulls, skimmers and skuas. They are gull-like in appearance, but typically have a lighter build, long pointed wings (which give them a fast, buoyant flight), a deeply forked tail and short legs. Most species are grey above and white below, and have a black cap that is reduced or flecked with white in the winter.

The greater crested tern was originally described as Sterna bergii by German naturalist Martin Lichtenstein in 1823, but was moved to its current genus Thalasseus, after mitochondrial DNA studies confirmed that the three main head patterns shown by terns (no black cap, black cap, black cap with a white forehead) corresponded to distinct clades.

The nearest relative of the greater crested tern is the critically endangered species Chinese crested tern (T. bernsteini), with the next closest being a group of three orange-billed species, West African crested tern T. albididorsalis, lesser crested tern (T. bengalensis), and royal tern (T. maximus). Earlier studies of the genus Thalasseus had not included T. bernsteini, as genetic material was not then available, but otherwise had broadly similar results.

The generic name of the greater crested tern is derived from Greek Thalassa, "sea", and the species epithet bergii commemorates Karl Heinrich Bergius, a Prussian pharmacist and botanist who collected the first specimens of this tern near Cape Town.

The greater crested tern has four or five geographical subspecies (depending on authority), differing mainly in the darkness of the upperparts and the bill dimensions. These are listed below in taxonomic sequence. A similar number of other potential subspecies have been proposed, but are not considered valid.

Subspecies	Image	Breeding range	Distinctive features	Population estimates
T. b. bergii (Lichtenstein, 1823)	Western Cape, South Africa	Coasts of South Africa and Namibia	Dark grey above, slightly larger than T. b. thalassinus, least white on head	20,000 individuals (inc 6,336 breeding pairs in South Africa and up to 1,682 pairs in Namibia)
T. b. enigma (Clancey, 1979)		Zambezi delta, Mozambique, south to Durban, South Africa	Palest subspecies Included in T. b. bergii by IOC and Olsen & Larsson (1995)	8,000–10,000 individuals in Madagascar and Mozambique
T. b. thalassinus (Stresemann, 1914)	Bird Island, Seychelles	Western Indian Ocean	Small and pale, larger and less pale in south of range	2,550–4,500 individuals in Eastern Africa and Seychelles
T. b. velox (Cretzschmar, 1827)	Iran	Red Sea, Persian Gulf, northern Indian Ocean	Largest, heaviest, darkest and longest-billed subspecies	33,000 in Middle East (inc 4,000 pairs in Oman and 3,500 pairs on islands off Saudi Arabia)
T. b. cristatus (Stephens, 1826)	Tasmania, Australia	Eastern Indian Ocean, Australia and western Pacific Ocean from Taiwan south to Tasmania	Like T. b. bergii, with tail, rump and back concolorous; paler in Australia	500,000+ individuals in Australia

== Description ==
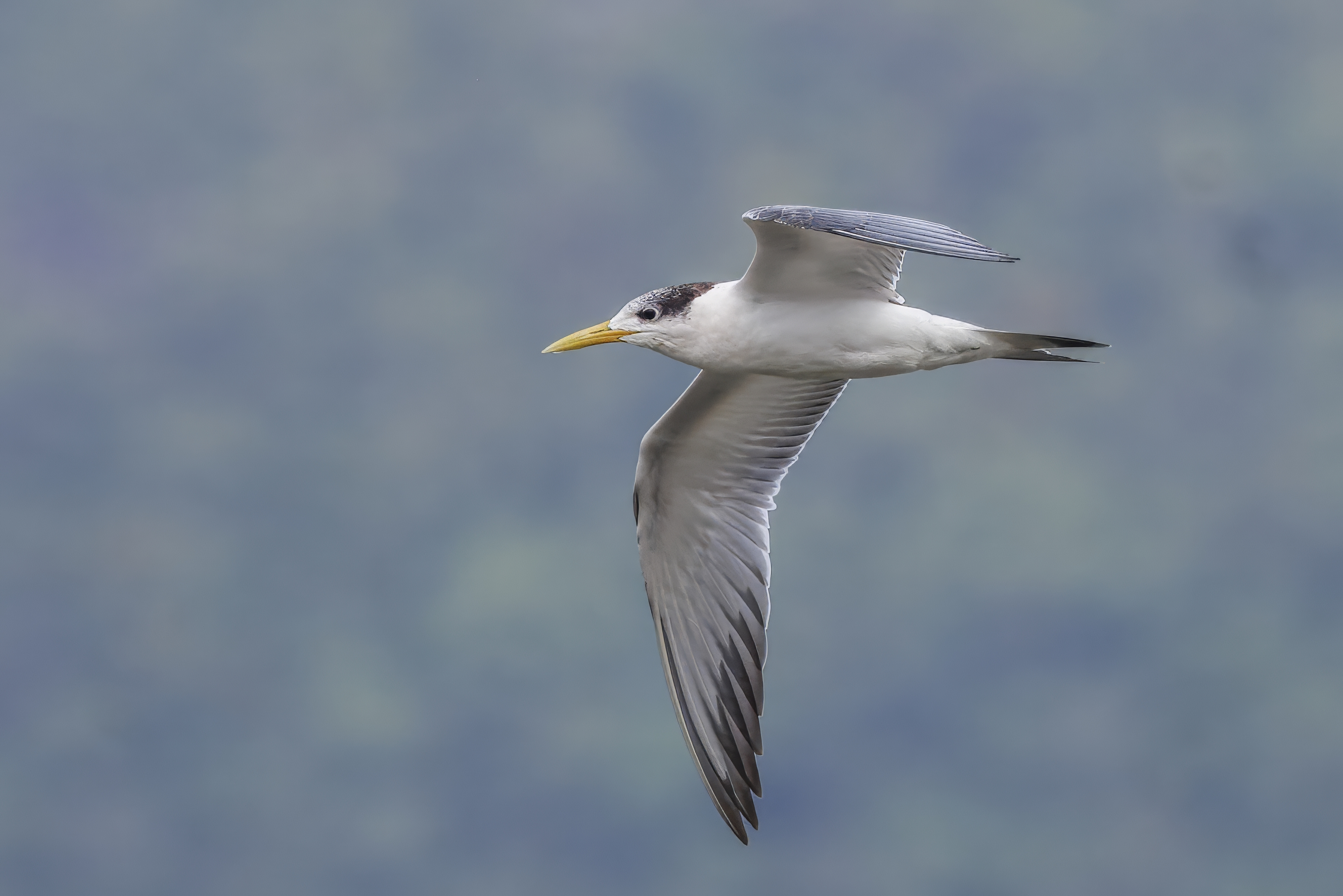
T. b. cristatus immature, French Polynesia

The greater crested tern is a large tern with a long (5.4–6.5 cm or 2.1–2.6 in) yellow bill, black legs, and a glossy black crest that is noticeably shaggy at its rear. The breeding adult of the nominate subspecies T. b. bergii is 46–49 cm (18–19.5 in) long, with a 125–130 cm (49–51 in) wing-span; weight 325–397 grams (11.5–14.0 oz). The forehead and the underparts are white, the back and inner wings are dusky-grey. In winter, the upperparts plumage wears to a paler grey, and the crown of the head becomes white, merging at the rear into a peppered black crest and mask.

The adults of both sexes are identical in appearance, but juvenile birds are distinctive, with a head pattern like the winter adult, and upperparts strongly patterned in grey, brown, and white; the closed wings appear to have dark bars. After moulting, the young terns resemble the adult, but still have a variegated wing pattern with a dark bar on the inner flight feathers.

The northern subspecies T. b. velox and T. b. thalassinus are in breeding plumage from May to September or October, whereas the relevant period for the two southern African subspecies is from December to April. For T. b. cristatus, the moult timing depends on location; birds from Australia and Oceania are in breeding plumage from September to about April, but those in Thailand, China and Sulawesi have this appearance from February to June or July.

The royal tern is similar in size to this species, but has a heavier build, broader wings, a paler back and a blunter, more orange bill. The greater crested often associates with the lesser crested tern, but is 25% larger than the latter, with a proportionately longer bill, longer and heavier head, and bulkier body. Lesser crested tern has an orange-tinted bill, and in immature plumage it is much less variegated than greater crested.

The greater crested tern is highly vocal, especially at its breeding grounds. The territorial advertising call is a loud, raucous, crow-like kerrak. Other calls include a korrkorrkorr given at the nest by anxious or excited birds, and a hard wep wep in flight.

== Distribution and habitat ==
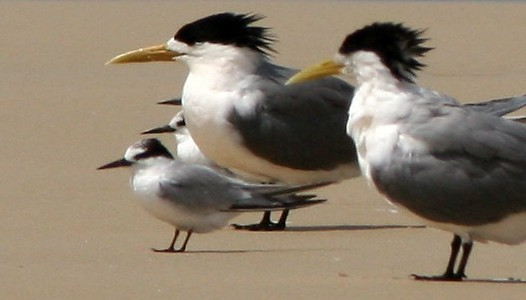
Roosting with little terns, note size difference

The greater crested tern occurs in tropical and warm temperate coastal parts of the Old World from South Africa around the Indian Ocean to the Pacific and Australia.

The subspecies T. b. bergii (including the doubtfully distinct T. b. enigma) breeds in southern Africa from Namibia to Tanzania, and possibly on islands around Madagascar. There is then a break in the breeding distribution of the species until T. b. velox is met in Somalia, the Red Sea, and the Persian Gulf, and another discontinuity further east in southern India.

The subspecies T. b. thalassinus breeds on many islands in the Indian Ocean including Aldabra and Etoile in the Seychelles, the Chagos Archipelago, and Rodrigues.

In the Pacific Ocean, there are colonies of T. b. cristatus on numerous Pacific islands, including Kiribati, Fiji, Tonga, the Society Islands and the Tuamotus, as well as more widely on islets off the coasts of China, Taiwan, the Philippines, Indonesia, New Guinea, and Australia south to Tasmania.

The nests are located on low‑lying sandy, rocky, or coral islands, sometimes amongst stunted shrubs, often without any shelter at all. When not breeding, the greater crested tern will roost or rest on open shores, less often on boats, pilings, harbour buildings and raised salt mounds in lagoons. It is rarely seen on tidal creeks or inland waters.

All populations of greater crested tern disperse after breeding. When Southern African birds leave colonies in Namibia and Western Cape Province, most adults move east to the Indian Ocean coastline of South Africa. Many young birds also travel east, sometimes more than 2,000 km (1,200 mi), but others move northwards along the western coast. T. b. thalassinus winters on the east African coast north to Kenya and Somalia and may move as far south as Durban. Populations of T. b. velox breeding from the Persian Gulf eastwards appear to be sedentary or dispersive rather than truly migratory, but those breeding in the Red Sea winter south along the east African coast to Kenya. T. b. cristatus mostly stays within 400 km (250 mi) of its colonies, but some birds wander up to around 1,000 km (620 mi). This species has occurred as a vagrant to Hawaii, New Zealand, North Korea, Jordan, and Israel.

In India, the greater crested tern is protected in the PM Sayeed Marine Birds Conservation Reserve.

== Behaviour ==
=== Breeding ===
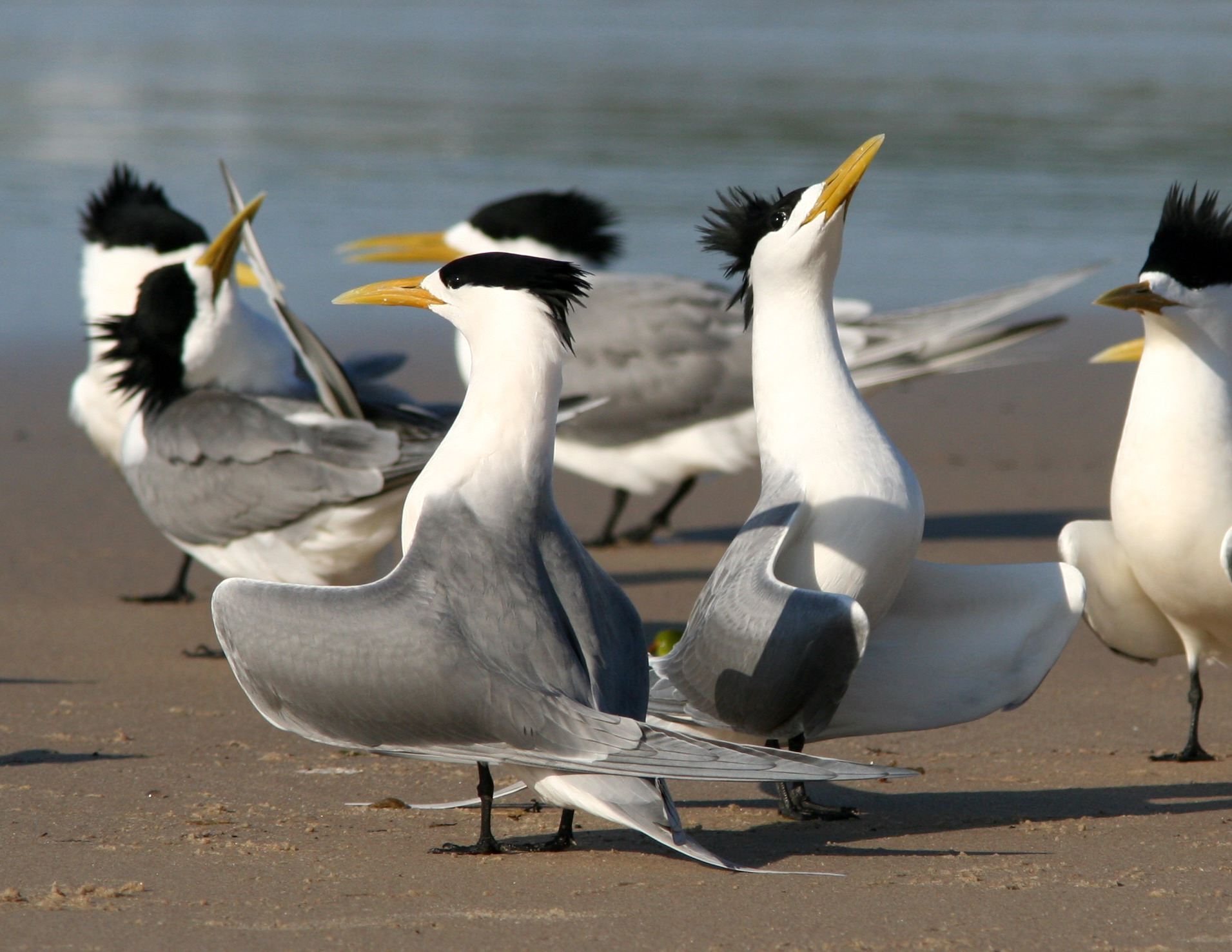
T. b. cristatus displaying

The greater crested tern breeds in colonies, often in association with other seabirds. It is monogamous and the pair bond is maintained through the year and sometimes in consecutive breeding seasons. The colony size is related to the abundance of pelagic fish prey, and the largest documented colony, with 13,000 to 15,000 pairs, is in the Gulf of Carpentaria in northern Australia, a region which also supports major colonies of other seabirds. Since nesting in this area follows the summer monsoonal flooding, it is presumably a response to fish stocks rising, probably due to river run-off providing extra nutrient to the Gulf. This tern does not show site fidelity, frequently changing its nest site from year to year, sometimes by more than 200 km (120 mi).

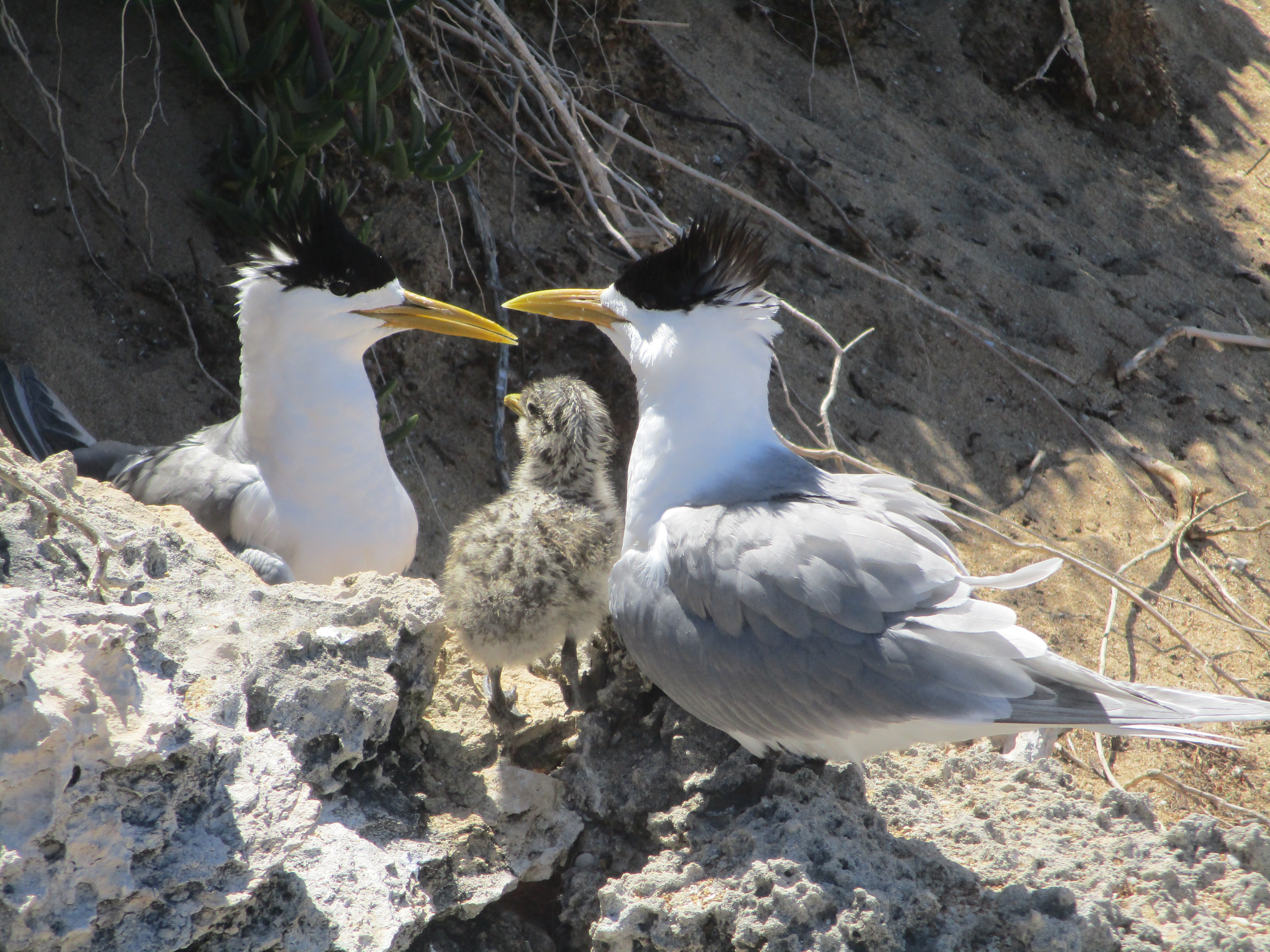
Greater crested tern chick with parents on Penguin Island, Western Australia

A male greater crested tern establishes a small area of the colony in preparation for nesting, and initially pecks at any other tern entering his territory. If the intruder is another male, it retaliates in kind, and is normally vigorously repelled by the incumbent. A female entering the nest area reacts passively to the male's aggression, enabling him to recognise her sex and initiate pair formation by display, including head raising and bowing; this behaviour is frequently repeated during nesting to reinforce the bond between the pair. Terns also use fish as part of the courtship ritual. One bird flies around the colony with a fish in its beak, calling loudly; its partner may also fly, but the pair eventually settle and the gift is exchanged.

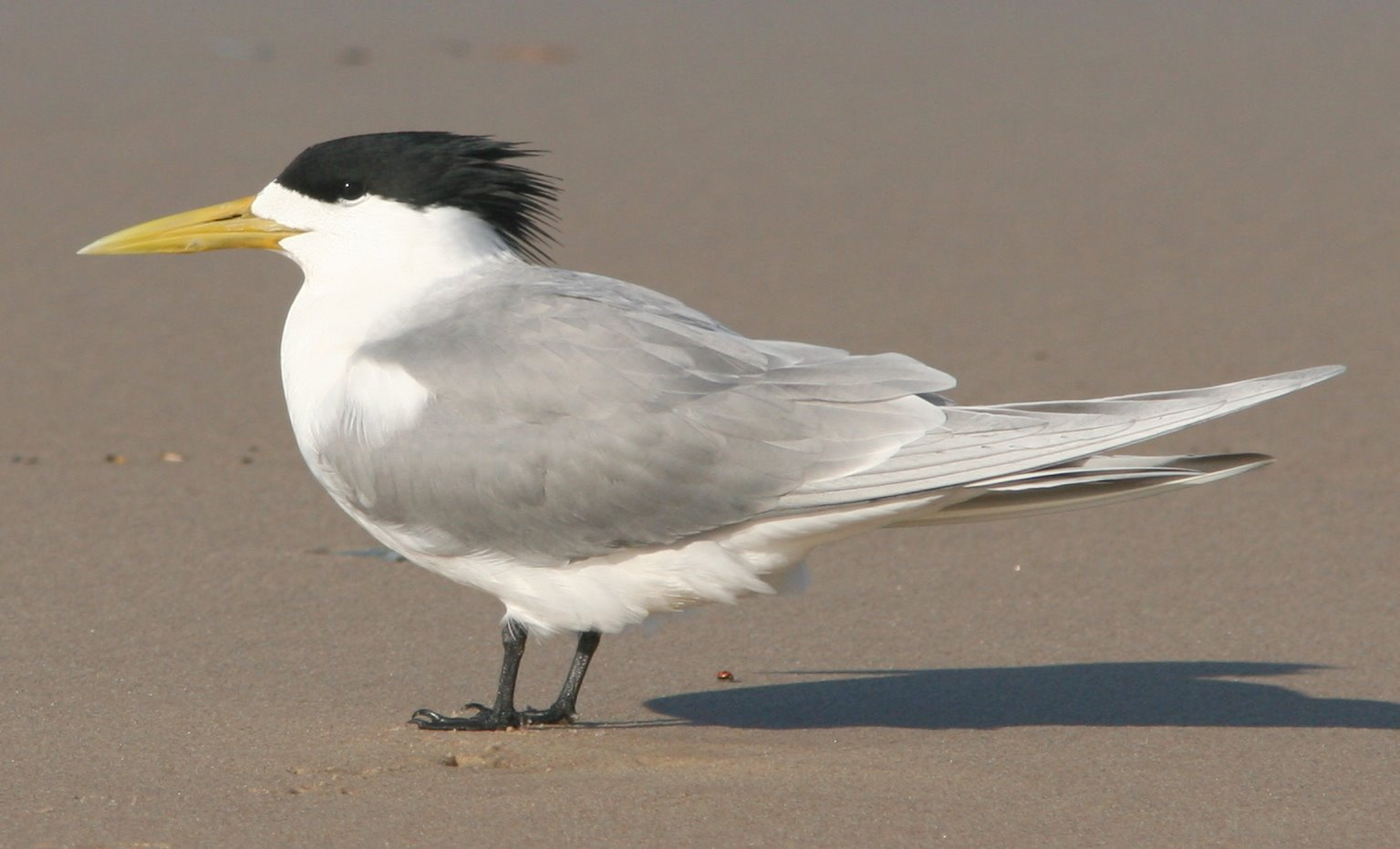
Breeding plumage in New South Wales

The nest is a shallow scrape in the sand on open, flat or occasionally sloping ground. It is often unlined, but sometimes includes stones or cuttlefish bones. One, sometimes two, eggs are laid and incubated by both parents for 25 to 30 days prior to hatching. The eggs are cream with blackish streaks. Egg laying is synchronised within a breeding colony and more tightly so within sub-colonies. Parents do not recognize their own eggs or newly hatched chicks, but are able to distinguish their chicks by the time they are two days-old, shortly before they begin to wander from the nest. The precocial chicks, which are very pale with black speckling, are brooded and fed by both parents, but may gather in crèches when older. The young terns fledge after 38 to 40 days, but remain dependent on the parents after leaving the colony until they are about four months old.

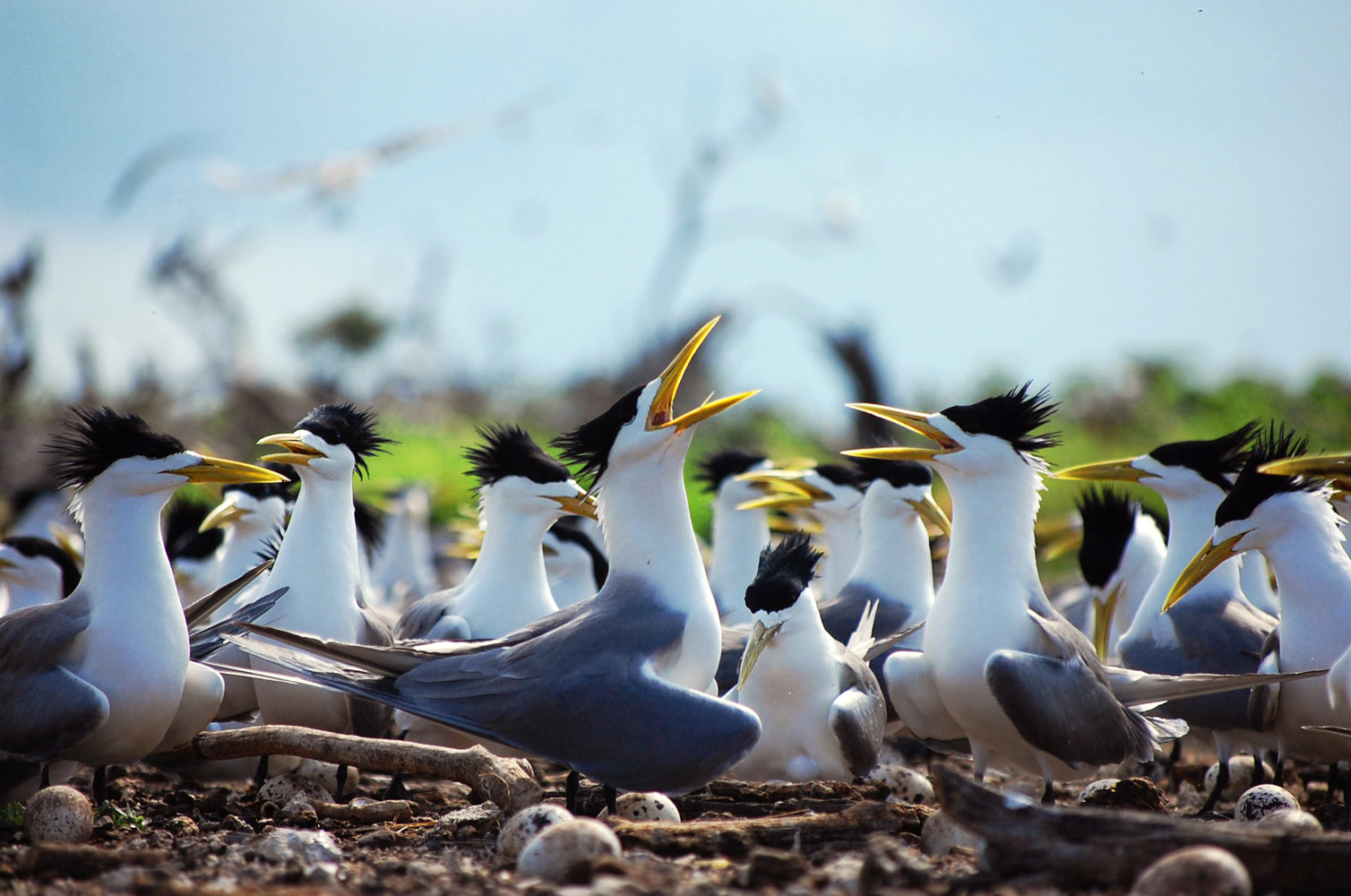
A nesting colony in Tubbataha Reef, Philippines

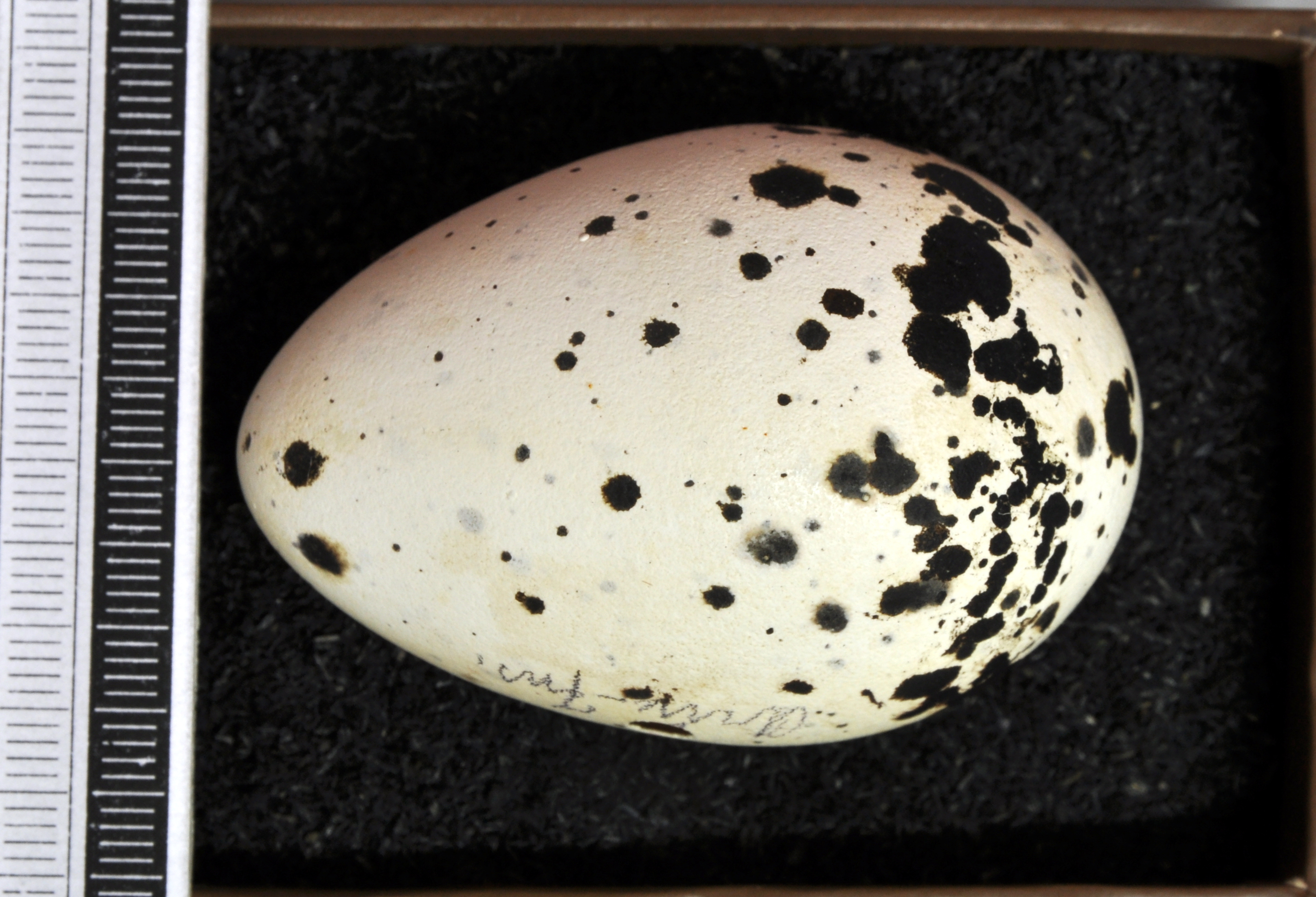
Egg, Collection Museum Wiesbaden

In South Africa, this species has adapted to breeding on the roofs of building, sometimes with Hartlaub's gull, which also shares the more typical nesting sites of the nominate subspecies. In 2000, 7.5% of the population of this subspecies bred on roofs. Artificial islands in salt pans and sewage works have also recently been colonised by this adaptable seabird.

Adult terns have few predators, but in Namibia immature birds are often robbed of their food by kelp gulls, and that species, along with Hartlaub's gull, silver gull and sacred ibis, has been observed feeding on eggs or nestlings, especially when colonies are disturbed. Smaller subcolonies with a relatively larger numbers of nests located on the perimeter are subject to more predation. In Australia, predation by cats and dogs, and occasional deaths by shooting or collisions with cars, wires or light-towers have been documented.

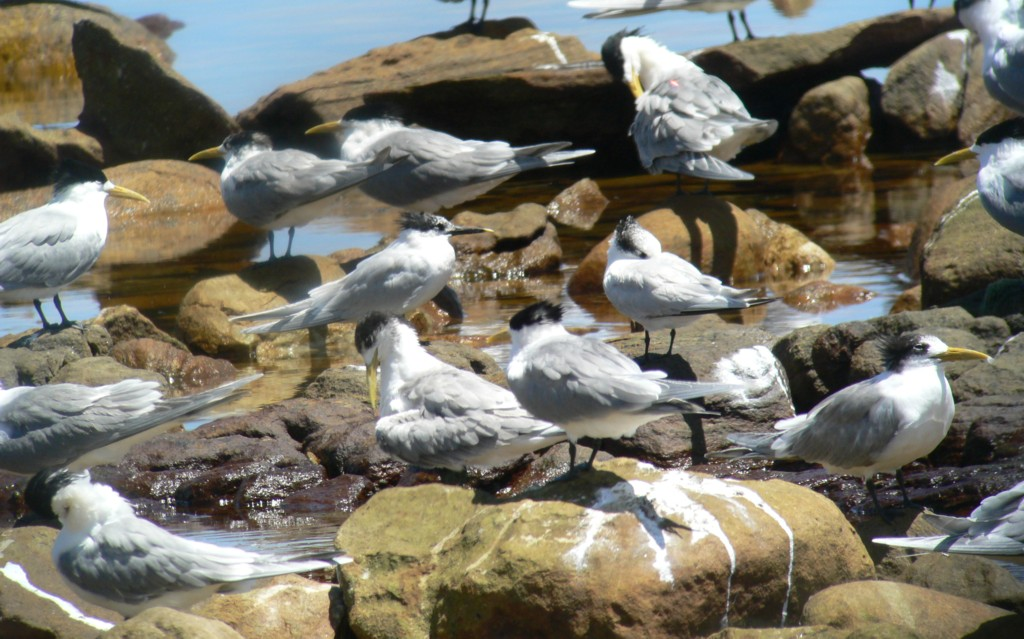
Nominate subspecies roosting with Sandwich terns in South Africa

Commercial fisheries can have both positive and negative effects on the greater crested tern. Juvenile survival rates are improved where trawler discards provide extra food, and huge population increases in the southeastern Gulf of Carpentaria are thought to have been due to the development of a large prawn trawl fishery. Conversely, purse-seine fishing reduces the available food supply, and sizeable fluctuations in the numbers of great crested terns breeding in the Western Cape of South Africa are significantly related to changes in the abundance of pelagic fish, which are intensively exploited by purse-seine fishing. Terns may be killed or injured by collisions with trawl warps, trapped in trawls or discarded gear, or hooked by longline fishing, but, unlike albatrosses and petrels, there is little evidence that overall numbers are significantly affected.

An unusual incident was the incapacitation of 103 terns off Robben Island, South Africa by marine foam, generated by a combination of wave action, kelp mucilage and phytoplankton. After treatment, 90% of the birds were fit to be released.

=== Feeding ===
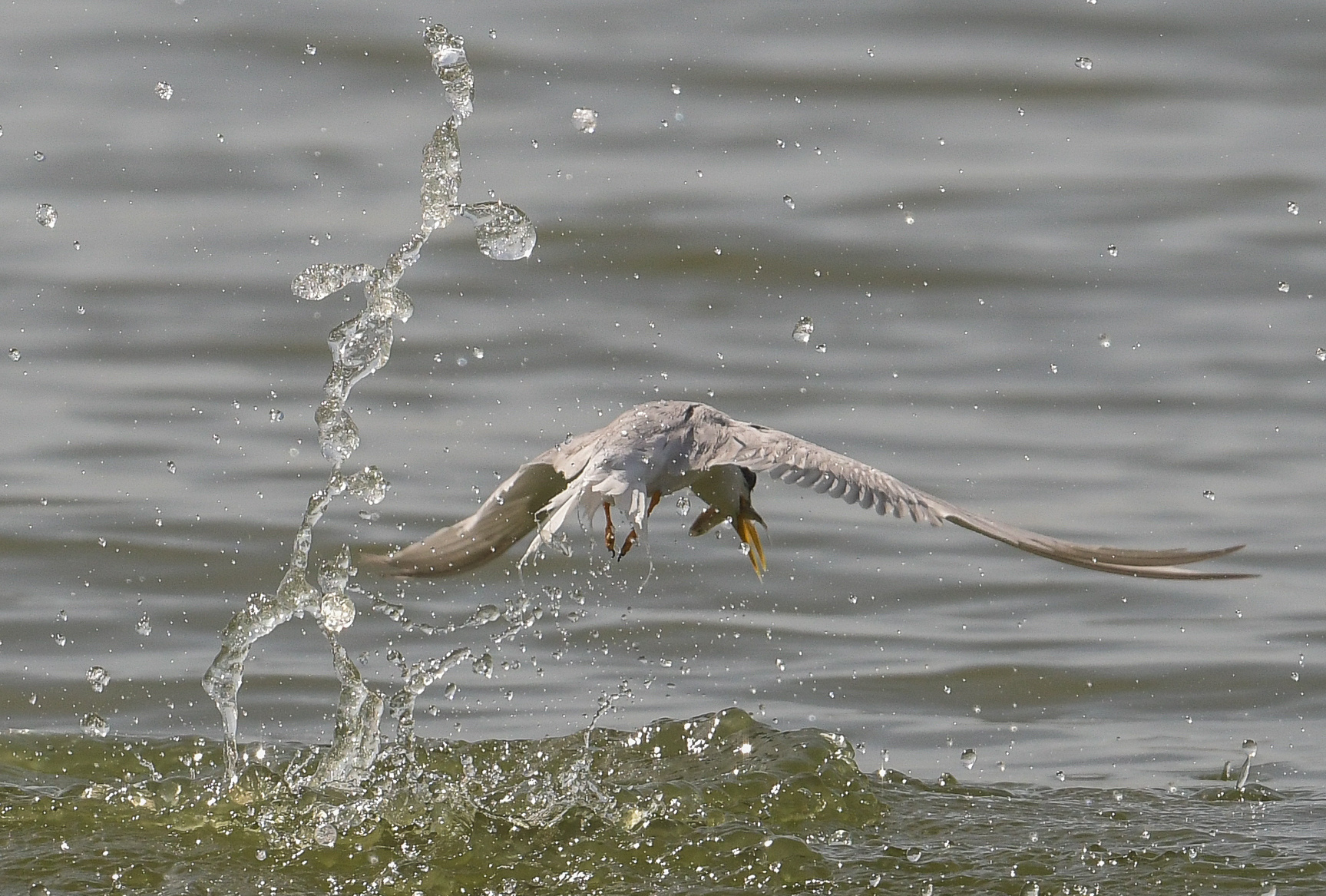
Greater crested tern with prey caught via a surface dip

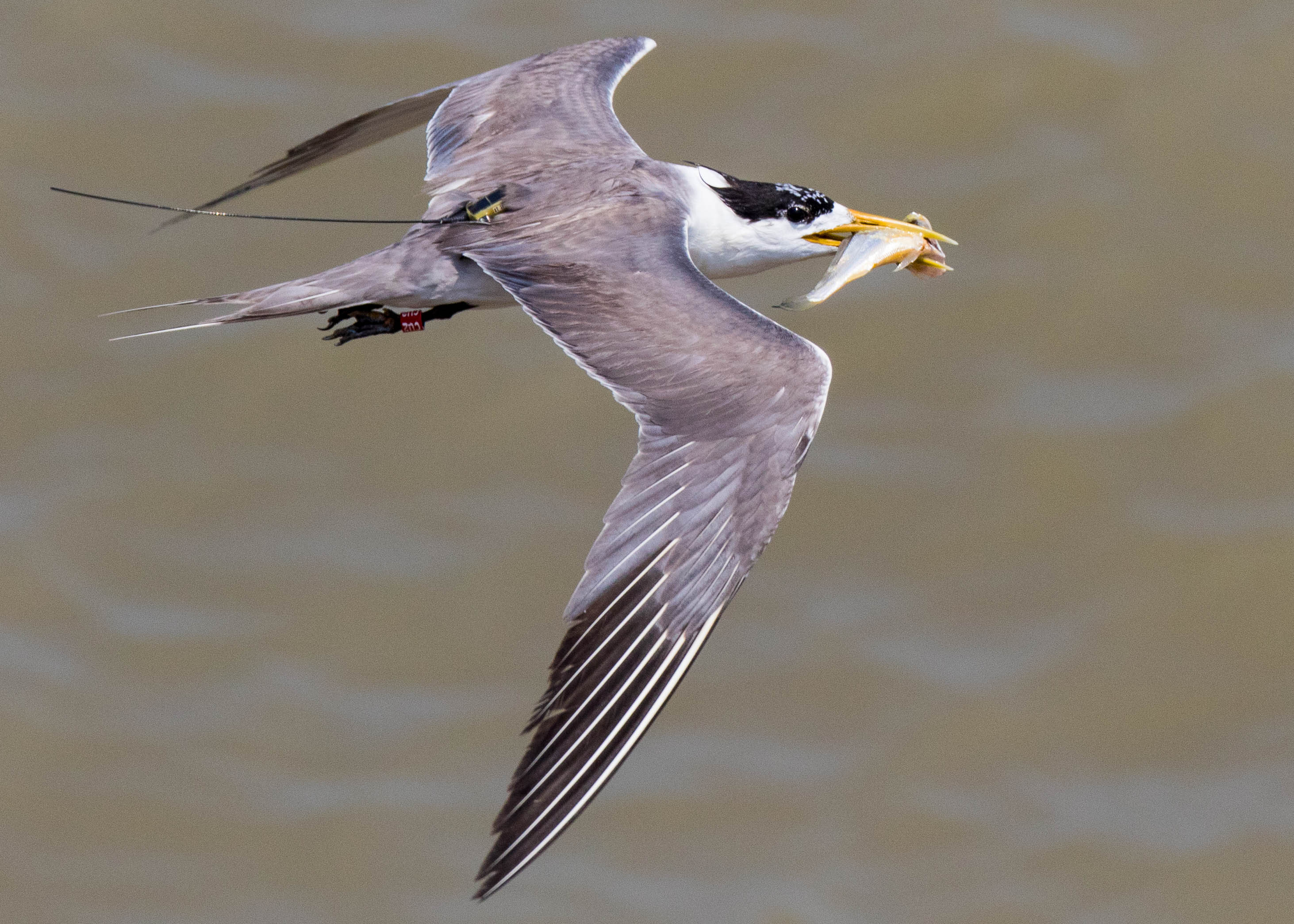
Greater crested tern with a fish in its beak

Fish are the main food of the greater crested tern, found to make up nearly 90% of all prey items with the remainder including cephalopods, crustaceans and insects. Unusual vertebrate prey included agamid lizards and green turtle hatchlings.

The greater crested tern feeds mostly at sea by plunge diving to a depth of up to 1 m (3.3 ft), or by dipping from the surface, and food is usually swallowed in mid-air. Birds may forage up to 10 km (6.2 mi) from land in the breeding season. Prey size ranges from 7–138 mm (0.28–5.43 in) in length and up to 30 g (1.1 oz) in weight. Shoaling pelagic fish such as anchovy and sardine are typical prey, but bottom-living species are taken as discards from commercial fishing. This tern actively follows trawlers, including at night, and during the fishing season trawl discards can constitute 70% of its diet. Prawn fishing is particularly productive in providing extra food, since prawns usually represent only 10–20% of the catch, the remaining being bycatch, mainly fish such as cardinalfish and gobies.

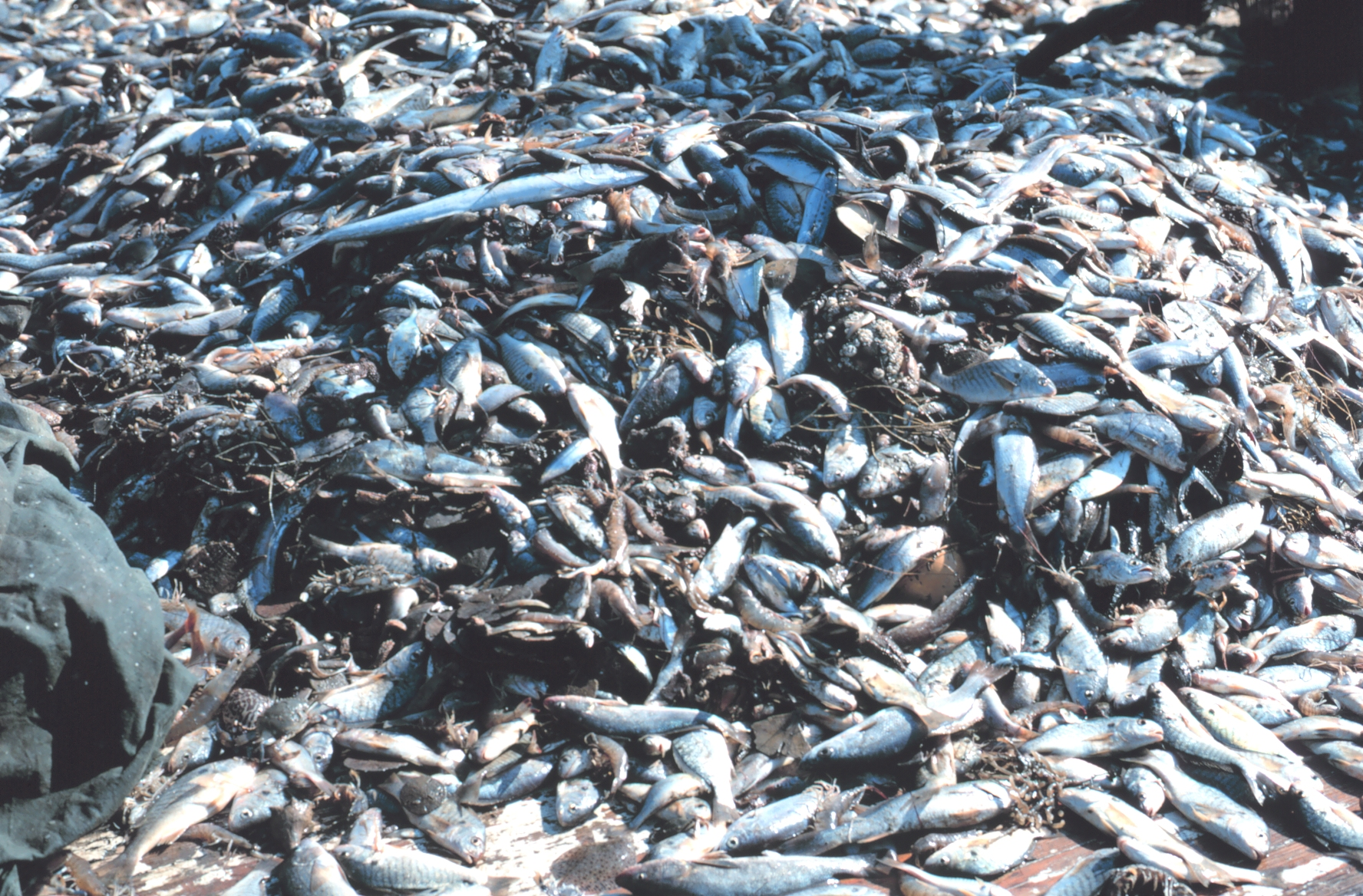
Bycatch from prawn fishing can provide extra food

A study of an area of the Great Barrier Reef where the number of breeding great crested terns has grown ten-fold, probably due to extra food from trawl by-catch, suggested that lesser crested and sooty terns have moved away and now breed on a part of the reef where fishing is banned. It is possible that the large increase in the number of greater crested terns may have affected other species through competition for food and nesting sites.

Terns have red oil droplets in the cone cells of the retinas of their eyes. This improves contrast and sharpens distance vision, especially in hazy conditions. Birds that have to see through an air/water interface, such as terns and gulls, have more strongly coloured carotenoid pigments in the cone oil drops than other avian species. The improved eyesight helps terns to locate shoals of fish, although it is uncertain whether they are sighting the phytoplankton on which the fish feed, or observing other terns diving for food. Tern's eyes are not particularly ultraviolet sensitive, an adaptation more suited to terrestrial feeders like the gulls.

== Status ==
The greater crested tern has a widespread distribution range, estimated at 1–10 million square kilometres (0.4–3.8 million square miles). The population has not been quantified, but it is not believed to approach the thresholds for either the size criterion (fewer than 10,000 mature individuals) or the population decline criterion (declining more than 30% in ten years or three generations) of the IUCN Red List. For these reasons, the species is evaluated as being of least concern at the global level. However, there are concerns for populations in some areas such as the Gulf of Thailand where the species no longer breeds, and in Indonesia where egg harvesting has caused declines.

All subspecies except T. b. cristatus are covered under the Agreement on the Conservation of African-Eurasian Migratory Waterbirds (AEWA). Parties to the Agreement are required to engage in a wide range of conservation strategies described in a detailed action plan. The plan is intended to address key issues such as species and habitat conservation, management of human activities, research, education, and implementation.

In August 2026, mass deaths of crested terns were discovered on three South Australian islands: The Pages and Troubridge Island, totalling around 1,000 dead birds. It was "presumed" that they had died of H5N1 bird flu, in a wave which had reached Australia during June 2026.

== Bibliography ==
- Cooper, John (2006) "Potential impacts of marine fisheries on migratory waterbirds of the Afrotropical Region: a study in progress" (PDF extract) in Boere, C.A.; Galbraith G.C.; Stroud D.A. (eds) Waterbirds around the world. Edinburgh: The Stationery Office, ISBN 0-11-497333-4
- Del Hoyo, Josep; Elliott, Andrew; Sargatal, Jordi, eds. (1996). Handbook of the Birds of the World: Hoatzin to Auks v. 3. Barcelona: Lynx Edicions. ISBN 84-87334-20-2.
- Harrison, Peter (1988). Seabirds. London: Christopher Helm. ISBN 0-7470-1410-8.
- Higgins, P. J.; Davies, S. J. J. F., eds. (1996). Handbook of Australian, New Zealand and Antarctic Birds: Volume 3: Snipe to Pigeons. Melbourne: Oxford University Press. ISBN 0-19-553070-5.
- Olsen, Klaus Malling; Larsson, Hans (1995). Terns of Europe and North America. London: Christopher Helm. ISBN 0-7136-4056-1.
- Snow, David; Perrins, Christopher M., eds. (1998). The Birds of the Western Palearctic (BWP) concise edition (2 volumes). Oxford: Oxford University Press. ISBN 0-19-854099-X.
