= Thimlapura Wildlife Sanctuary =

Sanctuary in Tumkur district, Karnataka, India

- IUCN category IV (habitat/species management area)
- Interactive map of Thimlapura Wildlife Sanctuary
- Location: Tumkur district, Karnataka, India

Thimlapura Wildlife Sanctuary is located in the Madhugiri and Koratagere Taluk of Tumkur in the state of Karnataka. It was declared a wildlife sanctuary under Section 36-A of the Wild Life (Protection) Act, 1972. It is inhabited by leopards, sloth bears, wild boars, Indian foxes, wolves, among other animals. Thimlapura Wildlife Sanctuary is a conservation reserve for sloth bear.

== Location ==
Thimlapura Wildlife Sanctuary is situated in Tumakuru district of Karnataka. It spans over an area of 50.86 km^{2}.
