= Achabal Wildlife Sanctuary =

Protected area in India

- IUCN category IV (habitat/species management area)
- Location: Anantnag, Jammu and Kashmir, India
- Area: 0.50 km^{2} (0.19 sq mi)
- Established: 2008

Achabal Wildlife Sanctuary (Sometimes Achabal Conservation Reserve) is in Anantnag district of Kashmir, 65 kilometres (40 mi) south of Srinagar. It spreads over an area of 0.50 km^{2} (0.19 sq mi). The Achabal forest area was once designated as a Game Reserve by the then Maharaja of Kashmir. In 2008, this area was upgraded to the Achabal Wildlife Sanctuary.

== Flora and fauna ==
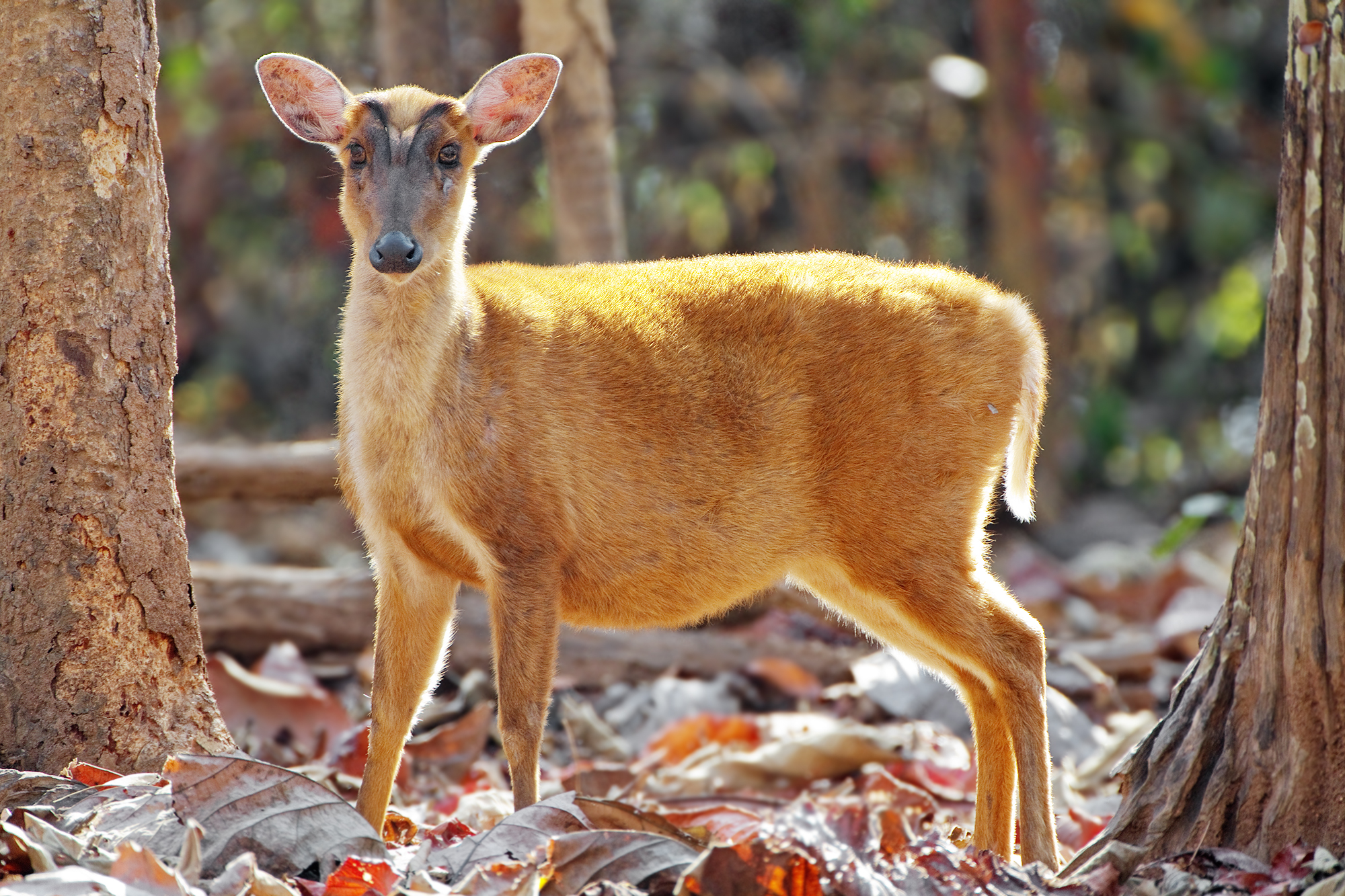
Barking deer

The vegetation present in the Achabal Wildlife sanctuary mainly includes mixed coniferous forests where kail pine, spruce, fir, birch, deodar and juniper trees are predominant.

The Achabal Wildlife Sanctuary is abode to many species of animals including the Himalayan black bear, leopard, jackal, leopard cat, Indian porcupine, hog deer, and the barking deer. A few species of wild birds are also found in the sanctuary.

== Disturbance ==
The Achabal Wildlife Sanctuary is not properly fenced and there are only a few concrete demarcations from human habitations that are close to the sanctuary. Besides, timber smuggling has also disturbed the ecological balance of the sanctuary.
