= Thiruppudaimarudur Conservation Reserve =

Tiruppadaimarathur Conservation Reserve
- IUCN category V (protected landscape/seascape)
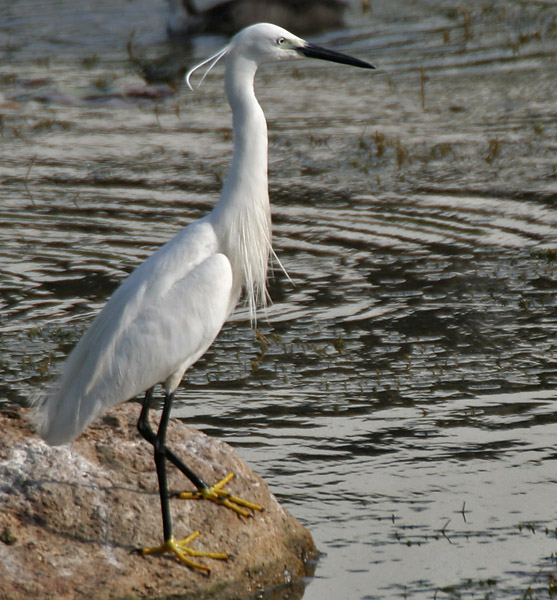
- Little egret
- Interactive map of Tiruppadaimarathur Conservation Reserve
- Location: Thiruppudaimaruthur
- Nearest city: Tirunelveli, Tamil Nadu, India
- Coordinates: 8°43′38″N 77°29′52″E
- Area: 0.0284 km^{2} (0.0110 sq mi)
- Established: 14 February 2005
- Governing body: Tamil Nadu Forest Department
- Website: www.forests.tn.nic.in/WildBiodiversity/cr_tcr.html

Tiruppadaimarathur Conservation Reserve is an IUCN Category V protected bird nesting area in the 2.84 hectares (7.0 acres) compound of Siva temple in Thiruppudaimarudur village, Tirunelveli District, Tamil Nadu, South India. It was declared 14 February 2005 and is the first Conservation Reserve to be established in India. The reserve is 10 kilometres (6.2 mi) from Kalakkad Mundanthurai Tiger Reserve.

== Management ==
The village community and Tamil Nadu Forest Department manage the area. Community participation and public support is crucial for any conservation effort to succeed. Amendments to the Wild life Protection Act in 2003, provided a mechanism to provide recognition and legal backing to community initiated efforts in wildlife protection. It provides for a flexible system wherein wildlife conservation is achieved without compromising community needs. Tiruppadaimarathur Conservation Reserve is the result of the village community coming forward to protect the birds nesting in their village and acting for declaration of a conservation reserve. This reserve was declared by Government of Tamil Nadu G.O.Ms. No.17 Environment and Forests Dept.

== Fauna and flora ==
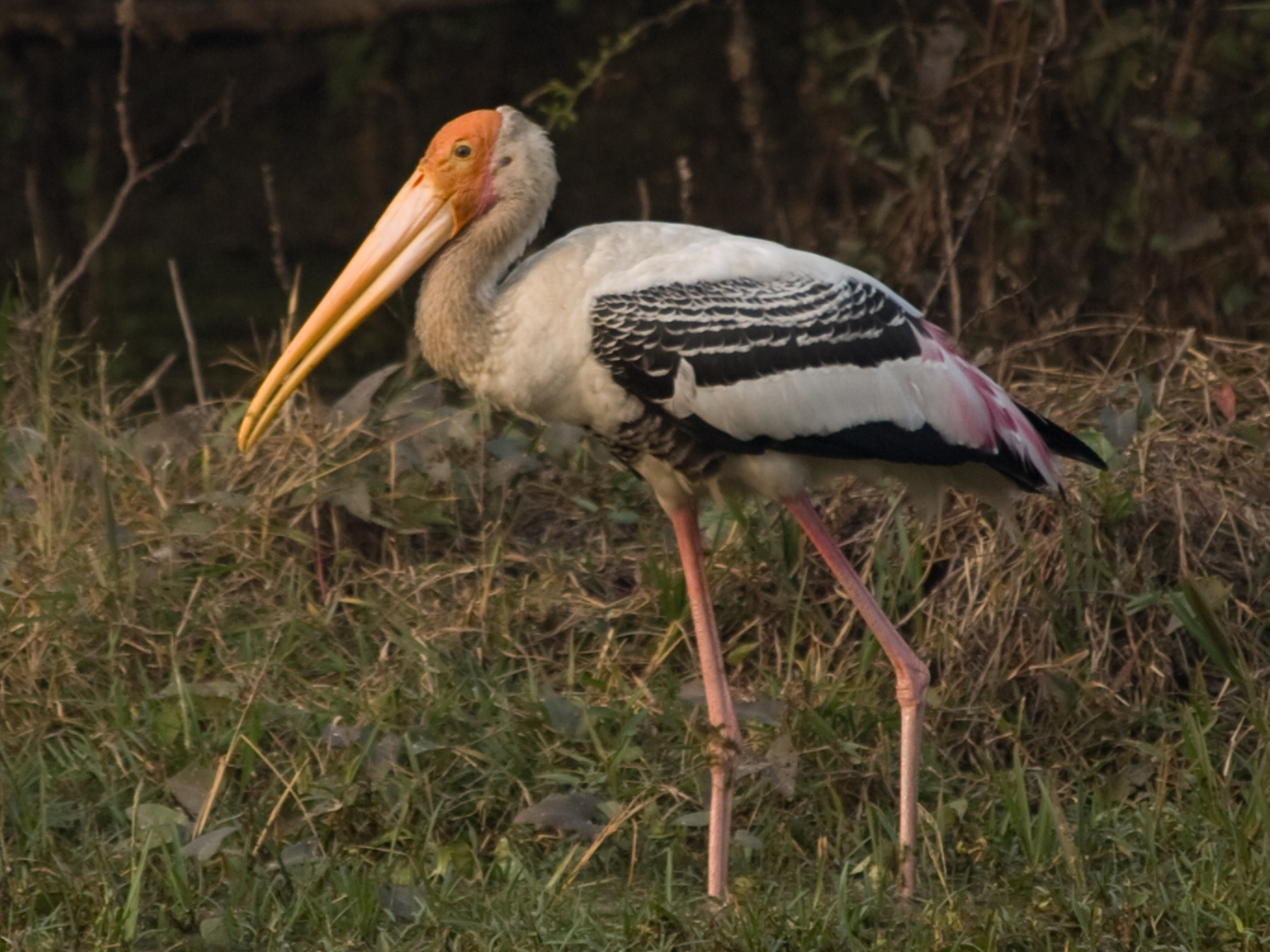
Painted stork

Over 400 little egrets, pond heron and near threatened painted stork nest in this grove of 20 huge, century-old maruthu, mahwa, neem and illuppai trees and feed in the many agricultural fields, a few ponds and the Thamirabarani River adjacent to it. Pond heron and egrets also nesting in backyards of few village houses, while painted storks are only around the temple. Spot-billed pelicans also come for refuge but are not nesting.
