= PM Sayeed Marine Birds Conservation Reserve =

Protected area in Lakshadweep, India

PM Sayeed Marine Birds Conservation Reserve is the first protected area for marine birds in India. It is located in the Indian Union Territory of Lakshadweep. It was formed in 2020. It covers an area of 62 km^{2}.

The PM Sayeed Marine Birds Conservation Reserve will be home to four species of pelagic seabirds – the Greater crested tern, Lesser crested tern, Sooty tern, and Brown noddy.

== See also ==
- Dr. K.K. Mohammed Koya Sea Cucumber Conservation Reserve
- Pichavaram
- Karimpuzha Wildlife Sanctuary
