= Attakoya Thangal Marine Reserve =

Marine reserve in the Arabian Sea

Attakoya Thangal Marine Reserve is the world's second marine conservation reserve for sea cucumbers. It was announced by the Lakshadweep Islands Administration in February 2020. This reserve covers an area of about 344 km^{2} and lies between Amini and Pitti archipelago. This came into action when the smuggling of rare sea cuumber species was reported. More than 1,716 sea cucumbers were seized by the administration on a desolate island named Suhali. These rare species are in great demand for medicines and food in countries like China. This conservation reserve comprises lagoons and coral formations which acts as a breeding ground for many species.
