= 15th Karnataka Assembly =

Legislature

The 15th Karnataka Legislative Assembly was constituted after the Karnataka Legislative Assembly elections in 2018. Polling was held on 12 May for 222 constituencies out of the 224-member assembly, with counting of votes and results declared on 15 May. The term of the assembly is for five years.

== Members ==
#	Constituency	Reserved	MLA	Party	Remarks
Belgaum District
1	Nippani		Shashikala Annasaheb Jolle	Bharatiya Janata Party	
2	Chikkodi-Sadalga		Ganesh Hukkeri	Indian National Congress	
3	Athani		Mahesh Kumathalli	Indian National Congress	Disqualified by the Hon'ble Speaker under the 10th Schedule of the Constitution with effect from 25 July 2019
3	Athani		Mahesh Kumathalli	Bharatiya Janata Party	Re-Elected on 9 December 2019 in bypolls necessitated after defection from Indian National Congress.
4	Kagwad		Srimant Patil	Indian National Congress	Disqualified by the Hon'ble Speaker under the 10th Schedule of the Constitution with effect from 25 July 2019
4	Kagwad		Srimant Patil	Bharatiya Janata Party	Re-Elected on 9 December 2019 in bypolls necessitated after defection from Indian National Congress.
5	Kudachi	SC	P. Rajeev	Bharatiya Janata Party	
6	Raybag	SC	Duryodhan Mahalingappa Aihole	Bharatiya Janata Party	
7	Hukkeri		Umesh Katti	Bharatiya Janata Party	Died on 6 September 2022
7	Hukkeri		Vacant		
8	Arabhavi		Balachandra Jarkiholi	Bharatiya Janata Party	
9	Gokak		Ramesh Jarkiholi	Indian National Congress	Disqualified by the Hon'ble Speaker under the 10th Schedule of the Constitution with effect from 25 July 2019
9	Gokak		Ramesh Jarkiholi	Bharatiya Janata Party	Re-Elected on 9 December 2019 in bypolls necessitated after defection from Indian National Congress.
10	Yemkanmardi	ST	Satish Jarkiholi	Indian National Congress	
11	Belagavi Uttar		Anil S Benake	Bharatiya Janata Party	
12	Belagavi Dakshin		Abhay Patil	Bharatiya Janata Party	
13	Belagavi Rural		Lakshmi Hebbalkar	Indian National Congress	
14	Khanapur		Anjali Nimbalkar	Indian National Congress	
15	Kittur		D. M. Basavantaray	Bharatiya Janata Party	
16	Bailhongal		Mahantesh Kaujlagi	Indian National Congress	
17	Saundatti Yellamma		Anand Mamani	Bharatiya Janata Party	Died on 23 October 2022
17	Saundatti Yellamma		Vacant		
18	Ramdurg		Mahadevappa Shivalingappa Yadawad	Bharatiya Janata Party	
Bagalkot District
19	Mudhol	SC	Govind M. Karjol	Bharatiya Janata Party	
20	Terdal		Siddu Savadi	Bharatiya Janata Party	
21	Jamkhandi		Siddu Nyamagouda	Indian National Congress	Died on 28 May 2018
21	Jamkhandi		Anand Nyamagouda	Indian National Congress	Elected on 6 November 2018 in By-election necessitated after Siddu Nyamagouda's death
22	Bilgi		Murugesh Nirani	Bharatiya Janata Party	
23	Badami		Siddaramaiah	Indian National Congress	
24	Bagalkot		Veerabhadrayya Charantimath	Bharatiya Janata Party	
25	Hungund		Doddanagowda Patil	Bharatiya Janata Party	
Bijapur District
26	Muddebihal		A. S. Patil (Nadahalli)	Bharatiya Janata Party	
27	Devar Hippargi		Somanagouda Patil	Bharatiya Janata Party	
28	Basavana Bagevadi		Shivanand S Patil	Indian National Congress	
29	Babaleshwar		M. B. Patil	Indian National Congress	
30	Bijapur City		Basangouda Patil Yatnal	Bharatiya Janata Party	
31	Nagathan	SC	Devanand Fulasing Chavan	Janata Dal (Secular)	
32	Indi		Y. V. Patil	Indian National Congress	
33	Sindagi		M. C. Managoli	Janata Dal (Secular)	Died on 28 January 2021
33	Sindagi		Ramesh Balappa Bhusanur	Bharatiya Janata Party	Elected on 2 November 2021 in by-elections necessitated after M. C. Managoli's death
Gulbarga District
34	Afzalpur		M. Y. Patil	Indian National Congress	
35	Jevargi		Ajay Dharam Singh	Indian National Congress	
Yadgir District
36	Shorapur	ST	Narasimhanayak (Rajugouda)	Bharatiya Janata Party	
37	Shahapur		Sharanabasappa Gouda Darshanapur	Indian National Congress	
38	Yadgir		Venkatreddy Mudnal	Bharatiya Janata Party	
39	Gurmitkal		Naganagowda Kandukar	Janata Dal (Secular)	
Gulbarga District
40	Chittapur	SC	Priyank M. Kharge	Indian National Congress	
41	Sedam		Rajkumar Patil	Bharatiya Janata Party	
42	Chincholi	SC	Umesh Jadhav	Indian National Congress	Resigned on 1 April 2019
42	Chincholi	SC	Avinash Jadhav	Bharatiya Janata Party	Elected on 25 May 2019 in By-election necessitated after Umesh Jadhav's resignation
43	Gulbarga Rural	SC	Basavaraj Mattimud	Bharatiya Janata Party	
44	Gulbarga Dakshin		Dattatraya C. Patil Revoor	Bharatiya Janata Party	
45	Gulbarga Uttar		Kaneez Fatima	Indian National Congress	
46	Aland		Guttedar Subhash Rukmayya	Bharatiya Janata Party	
Bidar District
47	Basavakalyan		B. Narayana Rao	Indian National Congress	Died on 24 September 2020
47	Basavakalyan		Sharanu Salagar	Bharatiya Janata Party	Elected on 2 May 2021 in By-election necessitated after B. Narayana Rao's death
48	Homnabad		Rajshekar Basavaraj Patil	Indian National Congress	
49	Bidar South		Bandeppa Kashempur	Janata Dal (Secular)	
50	Bidar		Rahim Khan	Indian National Congress	
51	Bhalki		Eshwara Bhimanna Khandre	Indian National Congress	
52	Aurad	SC	Prabhu Chavhan	Bharatiya Janata Party	
Raichur District
53	Raichur Rural	ST	Basanagouda Daddal	Indian National Congress	
54	Raichur		Dr. Shivaraj Patil S	Bharatiya Janata Party	
55	Manvi	ST	Raja Venkatappa Nayak	Janata Dal (Secular)	
56	Devadurga	ST	Shivanagouda Naik	Bharatiya Janata Party	
57	Lingsugur		D. S. Hoolageri	Indian National Congress	
58	Sindhanur		Venkatrao Nadagouda	Janata Dal (Secular)	
59	Maski	ST	Pratapagouda Patil	Indian National Congress	Disqualified by the Hon'ble Speaker under the 10th Schedule of the Constitution with effect from 25 July 2019
59	Maski	ST	Basanagouda Turvihal	Indian National Congress	Elected on 2 May 2021 in bypolls necessitated after Pratapagouda Patil's disqualification.
Koppal District
60	Kushtagi		Amaregouda Linganagouda Patil Bayyapur	Indian National Congress	
61	Kanakagiri	SC	Basavaraj Dhadesugur	Bharatiya Janata Party	
62	Gangawati		Paranna Munavalli	Bharatiya Janata Party	
63	Yelburga		Achar Halappa Basappa	Bharatiya Janata Party	
64	Koppal		K. Raghavendra Basavaraj Hitnal	Indian National Congress	
Gadag District
65	Shirahatti	SC	Ramappa Lamani	Bharatiya Janata Party	
66	Gadag		H. K. Patil	Indian National Congress	
67	Ron		Kalakappa Bandi	Bharatiya Janata Party	
68	Nargund		C. C. Patil	Bharatiya Janata Party	
Dharwad District
69	Navalgund		Patil Munenakoppa Shankar	Bharatiya Janata Party	
70	Kundgol		C. S. Shivalli	Indian National Congress	Died on 22 March 2019
70	Kundgol		Kusuma Shivalli	Indian National Congress	Elected on 25 May 2019 in By-election necessitated after C. S. Shivalli's death
71	Dharwad		Amrupayyappa Desai	Bharatiya Janata Party	
72	Hubli-Dharwad-East	SC	Abbayya Prasad	Indian National Congress	
73	Hubli-Dharwad-Central		Jagadish Shettar	Bharatiya Janata Party	
74	Hubli-Dharwad-West		Aravind Bellad	Bharatiya Janata Party	
75	Kalghatgi		C. M. Nimbannavar	Bharatiya Janata Party	
Uttara Kannada District
76	Haliyal		R. V. Deshapande	Indian National Congress	
77	Karwar		Roopali Naik	Bharatiya Janata Party	
78	Kumta		Dinakar Keshav Shetty	Bharatiya Janata Party	
79	Bhatkal		Sunil Biliya Naik	Bharatiya Janata Party	
80	Sirsi		Vishweshwar Hegde Kageri	Bharatiya Janata Party	23rd Speaker of Karnataka Legislative Assembly
81	Yellapur		Arbail Shivaram Hebbar	Indian National Congress	Disqualified by the Hon'ble Speaker under the 10th Schedule of the Constitution with effect from 25 July 2019
81	Yellapur		Arbail Shivaram Hebbar	Bharatiya Janata Party	Re-Elected on 9 December 2019 in bypolls necessitated after defection from Indian National Congress.
Haveri District
82	Hangal		C. M. Udasi	Bharatiya Janata Party	Died on 8 June 2021
82	Hangal		Srinivas Mane	Indian National Congress	Elected on 2 November 2021 in by-elections necessitated after C. M. Udasi's death.
83	Shiggaon		Basavaraj Bommai	Bharatiya Janata Party	
84	Haveri (SC)		Neharu Olekar	Bharatiya Janata Party	
85	Byadgi		Ballary Virupakshappa Rudrappa	Bharatiya Janata Party	
86	Hirekerur		B. C. Patil	Indian National Congress	Disqualified by the Hon'ble Speaker under the 10th Schedule of the Constitution with effect from 25 July 2019
86	Hirekerur		B. C. Patil	Bharatiya Janata Party	Re-Elected on 9 December 2019 in by-elections necessitated after defection from Indian National Congress.
87	Ranibennur		R. Shankar	Karnataka Pragnyavantha Janatha Party	Disqualified by the Hon'ble Speaker under the 10th Schedule of the Constitution with effect from 25 July 2019
87	Ranibennur		Arunkumar Guththur	Bharatiya Janata Party	Elected on 9 December 2019 in by-elections necessitated after R. Shankar's disqualification.
Vijayanagara District
88	Hoovina Hadagali	SC	P. T. Parameshwar Naik	Indian National Congress	
89	Hagaribommanahalli	SC	L.B.P. Bheemanaik	Indian National Congress	
90	Vijayanagara		Anand Singh	Indian National Congress	Disqualified by the Hon'ble Speaker under the 10th Schedule of the Constitution with effect from 25 July 2019
90	Vijayanagara		Anand Singh	Bharatiya Janata Party	Re-Elected on 9 December 2019 in bypolls necessitated after defection from Indian National Congress.
Ballari District
91	Kampli	ST	J.N. Ganesh	Indian National Congress	
92	Siruguppa	ST	M. S. Somalingappa	Bharatiya Janata Party	
93	Bellary Rural	ST	B. Nagendra	Indian National Congress	
94	Bellary City		G. Somashekara Reddy	Bharatiya Janata Party	
95	Sandur	ST	E. Tukaram	Indian National Congress	
Vijayanagara District
96	Kudligi		N. Y. Gopalakrishna	Bharatiya Janata Party	
Chitradurga District
97	Molakalmuru	ST	B. Sreeramulu	Bharatiya Janata Party	
98	Challakere	ST	T. Raghumurthy	Indian National Congress	
99	Chitradurga		G. H. Thippareddy	Bharatiya Janata Party	
100	Hiriyur		K. Poornima	Bharatiya Janata Party	
101	Hosadurga		Gulhatty D. Shekhar	Bharatiya Janata Party	
102	Holalkere	SC	M. Chandrappa	Bharatiya Janata Party	
Davanagere District
103	Jagalur	ST	S. V. Ramachandra	Bharatiya Janata Party	
Vijayanagara District
104	Harapanahalli		G. Karunakara Reddy	Bharatiya Janata Party	
Davanagere District
105	Harihar		S. Ramappa	Indian National Congress	
106	Davanagere North		S. A. Ravindranath	Bharatiya Janata Party	
107	Davanagere South		Shamanur Shivashankarappa	Indian National Congress	
108	Mayakonda	SC	N. Linganna	Bharatiya Janata Party	
109	Channagiri		K. Madal Veerupakshappa	Bharatiya Janata Party	
110	Honnali		M. P. Renukacharya	Bharatiya Janata Party	
Shimoga District
111	Shimoga Rural	SC	K. B. Ashok Naik	Bharatiya Janata Party	
112	Bhadravati		B.K. Sangameshwara	Indian National Congress	
113	Shimoga		K. S. Eshwarappa	Bharatiya Janata Party	
114	Tirthahalli		Araga Jnanendra	Bharatiya Janata Party	
115	Shikaripura		B. S. Yeddyurappa	Bharatiya Janata Party	
116	Soraba		Kumar Bangarappa	Bharatiya Janata Party	
117	Sagar		Hartalu Halappa	Bharatiya Janata Party	
Udupi District
118	Baindur		B. M. Sukumar Shetty	Bharatiya Janata Party	
119	Kundapura		Halady Srinivas Shetty	Bharatiya Janata Party	
120	Udupi		K. Raghupati Bhat	Bharatiya Janata Party	
121	Kapu		Lalaji Mendon	Bharatiya Janata Party	
122	Karkal		V. Sunil Kumar	Bharatiya Janata Party	
Chikmagalur District
123	Sringeri		T. D. Rajegowda	Indian National Congress	
124	Mudigere	SC	M. P. Kumaraswamy	Bharatiya Janata Party	
125	Chikmagalur		C. T. Ravi	Bharatiya Janata Party	
126	Tarikere		D. S. Suresh	Bharatiya Janata Party	
127	Kadur		Belliprakash	Bharatiya Janata Party	
Tumkur District
128	Chiknayakanhalli		J. C. Madhuswamy	Bharatiya Janata Party	
129	Tiptur		B. C. Nagesh	Bharatiya Janata Party	
130	Turuvekere		Jayaram A S	Bharatiya Janata Party	
131	Kunigal		Dr H.D. Ranganath	Indian National Congress	
132	Tumkur City		G. B. Jyothi Ganesh	Bharatiya Janata Party	
133	Tumkur Rural		D. C. Gowrishankar	Janata Dal (Secular)	
134	Koratagere	SC	Dr. G. Parameshwara	Indian National Congress	
135	Gubbi		S. R. Srinivas	Janata Dal (Secular)	
136	Sira		B. Satyanarayana	Janata Dal (Secular)	Died on 4 August 2020
136	Sira		C. M. Rajesh Gowda	Bharatiya Janata Party	Elected on 10 November 2020 in By-election necessitated after B. Satyanarayana's death
137	Pavagada		Venkata Ramanappa	Indian National Congress	
138	Madhugiri		M.V. Veerabhadraiah	Janata Dal (Secular)	
Chikkaballapur District
139	Gauribidanur		N. H. Shivashankara Reddy	Indian National Congress	
140	Bagepalli		S. N. Subbareddy	Indian National Congress	
141	Chikkaballapur		K. Sudhakar	Indian National Congress	Disqualified by the Hon'ble Speaker under the 10th Schedule of the Constitution with effect from 25 July 2019
141	Chikkaballapur		K. Sudhakar	Bharatiya Janata Party	Re-Elected on 9 December 2019 in bypolls necessitated after defection from Indian National Congress.
142	Sidlaghatta		V. Muniyappa	Indian National Congress	
143	Chintamani		J. K. Krishnareddy	Janata Dal (Secular)	
Kolar District
144	Srinivasapur		K. R. Ramesh kumar	Indian National Congress	
145	Mulbagal	SC	H. Nagesh	Independent	
146	Kolar Gold Field	SC	M. Roopakala	Indian National Congress	
147	Bangarapet	SC	S. N. Narayanaswamy K. M	Indian National Congress	
148	Kolar		K. Srinivasa Gowda	Janata Dal (Secular)	
149	Malur		K. Y. Nanjegowda	Indian National Congress	
Bangalore Urban District
150	Yelahanka		S. R. Vishwanath	Bharatiya Janata Party	
151	K. R. Pura		Byrathi Basavaraj	Indian National Congress	Disqualified by the Hon'ble Speaker under the 10th Schedule of the Constitution with effect from 25 July 2019
151	K. R. Pura		Byrathi Basavaraj	Bharatiya Janata Party	Re-Elected on 9 December 2019 in bypolls necessitated after defection from Indian National Congress.
152	Byatarayanapura		Krishna Byre Gowda	Indian National Congress	
153	Yeshwanthpur		S. T. Somashekar	Indian National Congress	Disqualified by the Hon'ble Speaker under the 10th Schedule of the Constitution with effect from 25 July 2019
153	Yeshwanthpur		S. T. Somashekar	Bharatiya Janata Party	Re-Elected on 9 December 2019 in bypolls necessitated after defection from Indian National Congress.
154	Rajarajeshwari Nagar		Munirathna	Indian National Congress	Disqualified by the Hon'ble Speaker under the 10th Schedule of the Constitution with effect from 25 July 2019
154	Rajarajeshwari Nagar		Munirathna	Bharatiya Janata Party	Re-Elected on 10 November 2020 in bypolls necessitated after defection from Indian National Congress.
155	Dasarahalli		R. Manjunatha	Janata Dal (Secular)	
156	Mahalakshmi Layout		K. Gopalaiah	Janata Dal (Secular)	Disqualified by the Hon'ble Speaker under the 10th Schedule of the Constitution with effect from 25 July 2019
156	Mahalakshmi Layout		K. Gopalaiah	Bharatiya Janata Party	Re-Elected on 9 December 2019 in bypolls necessitated after defection from Janata Dal (Secular).
157	Malleshwaram		Dr. C.N. Ashwath Narayan	Bharatiya Janata Party	
158	Hebbal		Suresha BS	Indian National Congress	
159	Pulakeshinagar	SC	Akhanda Srinivas Murthy	Indian National Congress	
160	Sarvagnanagar		K. J. George	Indian National Congress	
161	C. V. Raman Nagar	SC	S. Raghu	Bharatiya Janata Party	
162	Shivajinagar		Roshan Baig	Indian National Congress	Disqualified by the Hon'ble Speaker under the 10th Schedule of the Constitution with effect from 25 July 2019
162	Shivajinagar		Rizwan Arshad	Indian National Congress	Elected on 9 December 2019 in bypolls necessitated after Roshan Baig's disqualification.
163	Shanti Nagar		N. A. Haris	Indian National Congress	
164	Gandhi Nagar		Dinesh Gundu Rao	Indian National Congress	
165	Rajaji Nagar		S. Suresh Kumar	Bharatiya Janata Party	
166	Govindraj Nagar		V. Somanna	Bharatiya Janata Party	
167	Vijay Nagar		M. Krishnappa	Indian National Congress	
168	Chamrajpet		Zameer Ahmed Khan	Indian National Congress	
169	Chickpet		Uday B. Garudachar	Bharatiya Janata Party	
170	Basavanagudi		L. A. Ravi Subramanya	Bharatiya Janata Party	
171	Padmanaba Nagar		R. Ashoka	Bharatiya Janata Party	
172	B.T.M. Layout		Ramalinga Reddy	Indian National Congress	
173	Jayanagar		Soumya Reddy	Indian National Congress	
174	Mahadevapura	SC	Aravind Limbavali	Bharatiya Janata Party	
175	Bommanahalli		M Satish Reddy	Bharatiya Janata Party	
176	Bangalore South		M. Krishnappa	Bharatiya Janata Party	
177	Anekal		B.Shivanna	Indian National Congress	
Bangalore Rural District
178	Hoskote		M. T. B. Nagaraj	Indian National Congress	Disqualified by the Hon'ble Speaker under the 10th Schedule of the Constitution with effect from 25 July 2019
178	Hoskote		Sharath Kumar Bachegowda	Independent	Elected on 9 December 2019 in by-elections necessitated after M. T. B. Nagaraj's disqualification.
179	Devanahalli	SC	Nisarga Narayanaswamy L.N	Janata Dal (Secular)	
180	Doddaballapur		T. Venkataramanaiah	Indian National Congress	
181	Nelamangala	SC	Dr. K. Srinavasamurthy	Janata Dal (Secular)	
Ramanagara District
182	Magadi		A. Manjunath	Janata Dal (Secular)	
183	Ramanagara		H. D. Kumaraswamy	Janata Dal (Secular)	Vacated. Retained Channapatna seat on 26 May 2018
183	Ramanagara		Anitha Kumaraswamy	Janata Dal (Secular)	Elected on 6 November 2018 in by-elections necessitated after H. D. Kumaraswamy Vacated and Retained Channapatna seat
184	Kanakapura		D. K. Shivakumar	Indian National Congress	
185	Channapatna		H. D. Kumaraswamy	Janata Dal (Secular)	
Mandya District
186	Malavalli	SC	Dr. K. Annadani	Janata Dal (Secular)	
187	Maddur		D. C. Thammanna	Janata Dal (Secular)	
188	Melukote		C. S. Puttaraju	Janata Dal (Secular)	
189	Mandya		M. Srinivas	Janata Dal (Secular)	
190	Shrirangapattana		Ravindra Srikantaiah	Janata Dal (Secular)	
191	Nagamangala		Suresh Gowda	Janata Dal (Secular)	
192	Krishnarajpet		Narayana Gowda	Janata Dal (Secular)	Disqualified by the Hon'ble Speaker under the 10th Schedule of the Constitution with effect from 25 July 2019
192	Krishnarajpet		Narayana Gowda	Bharatiya Janata Party	Re-Elected on 9 December 2019 in by-elections necessitated after defection from Janata Dal (Secular).
193	Shravanabelagola		C. N. Balakrishna	Janata Dal (Secular)	
194	Arsikere		K. M. Shivalingegowda	Janata Dal (Secular)	
195	Belur		K. S. Lingesha	Janata Dal (Secular)	
196	Hassan		Preetham J. Gowda	Bharatiya Janata Party	
197	Holenarasipur		H. D. Revanna	Janata Dal (Secular)	
198	Arkalgud		A. T. Ramaswamy	Janata Dal (Secular)	
199	Sakleshpur	SC	H. K. Kumaraswamy	Janata Dal (Secular)	
Dakshina Kannada District
200	Belthangady		Harish Poonja	Bharatiya Janata Party	
201	Moodabidri		Umanatha A. Kotian	Bharatiya Janata Party	
202	Mangalore City North		Bharath Shetty	Bharatiya Janata Party	
203	Mangalore City South		D. Vedavyas Kamath	Bharatiya Janata Party	
204	Mangalore		U. T. Khader	Indian National Congress	
205	Bantval		Rajesh Naik	Bharatiya Janata Party	
206	Puttur		Sanjeeva Matandoor	Bharatiya Janata Party	
207	Sullia	SC	Angara S	Bharatiya Janata Party	
Kodagu District
208	Madikeri		Appachu Ranjan	Bharatiya Janata Party	
209	Virajpet		K. G. Bopaiah	Bharatiya Janata Party	
Mysore District
210	Periyapatna		K. Mahadeva	Janata Dal (Secular)	
211	Krishnarajanagara		S. R. Mahesh	Janata Dal (Secular)	
212	Hunsuru		H. Vishwanath	Janata Dal (Secular)	Disqualified by the Hon'ble Speaker under the 10th Schedule of the Constitution with effect from 25 July 2019
212	Hunsuru		H. P. Manjunath	Indian National Congress	Elected on 9 December 2019 in bypolls necessitated after H. Vishwanath's disqualification.
213	Heggadadevankote	ST	Anil Kumar C.	Indian National Congress	
214	Nanjangud	SC	Harshavardhan B.	Bharatiya Janata Party	
215	Chamundeshwari		GT Devegowda	Janata Dal (Secular)	
216	Krishnaraja		S. A. Ramadas	Bharatiya Janata Party	
217	Chamaraja		L. Nagendra	Bharatiya Janata Party	
218	Narasimharaja		Tanveer Sait	Indian National Congress	
219	Varuna		Yathindra S.	Indian National Congress	
220	T Narasipura	SC	Ashvin Kumar M.	Janata Dal (Secular)	
Chamarajanagar District
221	Hanur		R. Narendra	Indian National Congress	
222	Kollegal	SC	N. Mahesh	Bahujan Samaj Party	
223	Chamrajanagar		C. Puttarangashetty	Indian National Congress	
224	Gundlupet		C.S. Niranjan Kumar	Bharatiya Janata Party	
225	Anglo-Indian		Vinisha Nero	Nominated	

Sources: Election Commission of India, Times of India, News 18, News Minute

== Governor ==
No.	Governor	Term	
No.	Governor	From	To
1.	Vajubhai Vala	17 May 2018	6 July 2021
2.	Thawar Chand Gehlot	11 July 2021	Incumbent

== Speaker ==
No.	Speaker	Term		Party
No.	Speaker	From	To	Party
1.	K. R. Ramesh Kumar	25 May 2018	29 July 2019	Indian National Congress
2.	Vishweshwar Hegde Kageri	31 July 2019	20 May 2023	Bharatiya Janata Party

== Deputy Speaker ==
No.	Deputy Speaker	Term		Party
No.	Deputy Speaker	From	To	Party
1.	JK Krishna Reddy	6 July 2018	17 March 2020	Janata Dal (Secular)
2.	Anand Mamani	25 March 2020	23 October 2022	Bharatiya Janata Party

== Leader of the House (Chief Minister) ==
No.	Chief Minister	Term		Party
No.	Chief Minister	From	To	Party
1.	B. S. Yediyurappa	17 May 2018	19 May 2018	Bharatiya Janata Party
2.	H. D. Kumaraswamy	23 May 2018	23 July 2019	Janata Dal (Secular)
3.	B. S. Yediyurappa	26 July 2019	26 July 2021	Bharatiya Janata Party
4.	Basavaraj Bommai	28 July 2021	20 May 2023	Bharatiya Janata Party

== Deputy Leader of the House (Deputy Chief Minister) ==
No.	Deputy Chief Minister	Term		Party
No.	Deputy Chief Minister	From	To	Party
1.	G. Parameshwara	23 May 2018	23 July 2019	Indian National Congress
2.	C. N. Ashwath Narayan	26 August 2019	26 August 2021	Bharatiya Janata Party
3.	Govind Karjol	26 August 2019	26 August 2021	Bharatiya Janata Party
4.	Laxman Savadi	26 August 2019	26 August 2021	Bharatiya Janata Party

== Leader of the Opposition ==
No.	Leader of the Opposition	Term		Party
No.	Leader of the Opposition	From	To	Party
1.	B. S. Yediyurappa	25 May 2018	26 July 2019	Bharatiya Janata Party
2.	Siddaramaiah	9 October 2019	13 May 2023	Indian National Congress
