= List of by-elections to the Karnataka Legislative Assembly =

The following is a list of by-elections held for the Karnataka Legislative Assembly, India, since its formation in 1956.

== 14th Assembly ==
=== 2014 ===
S.No	Date	Constituency	MLA before election	Party before election	Elected MLA	Party after election
1	21 August 2014	Chikkodi-Sadalga	Prakash Babanna Hukkeri	Indian National Congress	Ganesh Prakash Hukkeri	Indian National Congress
2	21 August 2014	Bellary Rural	B. Sriramulu	Badavara Shramikara Raitara Congress	NY Gopalkrishna	Indian National Congress
3	21 August 2014	Shikaripura	B. S. Yeddyurappa	Karnataka Janata Paksha	B. Y. Raghavendra	Bharatiya Janata Party

=== 2016 ===
S.No	Date	Constituency	MLA before election	Party before election	Elected MLA	Party after election
1	13 February 2016	Bidar	Gurupadappa Nagamarapalli	Bharatiya Janata Party	Rahim Khan	Indian National Congress
2	13 February 2016	Devadurga	Venkatesh Nayak	Indian National Congress	K. Shivana Gowda Nayaka	Bharatiya Janata Party
3	13 February 2016	Hebbal	R Jagadeesh Kumar	Indian National Congress	Y.A. Narayana Swamy	Bharatiya Janata Party

=== 2017 ===
S.No	Date	Constituency	MLA before election	Party before election	Elected MLA	Party after election
214	9 April 2017	Nanjangud	Srinivas Prasad	Indian National Congress	Kalale N. Keshavamurthy	Indian National Congress
224	9 April 2017	Gundlupet	H. S. Mahadeva Prasad	Indian National Congress	M.C. Mohan Kumari	Indian National Congress

== 15th Assembly ==
=== 2018 ===
S.No	Date	Constituency	MLA before election	Party before election	Elected MLA	Party after election
1	6 November 2018	Ramanagara	H. D. Kumaraswamy	Janata Dal (Secular)	Anitha Kumaraswamy	Janata Dal (Secular)
2	6 November 2018	Jamkhandi	Siddu Nyamagouda	Indian National Congress	Anand Nyamagouda	Indian National Congress

=== 2019 ===
S.No	Date	Constituency	MLA before election	Party before election	Elected MLA	Party after election
1	23 April 2019	Kundgol	Channabasappa Satyappa Shivalli	Indian National Congress	Kusumavati Channabasappa Shivalli	Indian National Congress
2	23 April 2019	Chincholi	Umesh. G. Jadhav	Indian National Congress	Avinash Umesh Jadhav	Bharatiya Janata Party
3	5 December 2019	Athani	Mahesh Kumathalli	Indian National Congress	Mahesh Kumathalli	Bharatiya Janata Party
4	5 December 2019	Kagwad	Shrimant Balasaheb Patil	Indian National Congress	Shrimant Balasaheb Patil	Bharatiya Janata Party
5	5 December 2019	Gokak	Ramesh Jarkiholi	Indian National Congress	Ramesh Jarkiholi	Bharatiya Janata Party
6	5 December 2019	Yellapur	Arbail Shivaram Hebbar	Indian National Congress	Arbail Shivaram Hebbar	Bharatiya Janata Party
7	5 December 2019	Hirekerur	B. C. Patil	Indian National Congress	B. C. Patil	Bharatiya Janata Party
8	5 December 2019	Vijayanagara	Anand Singh	Indian National Congress	Anand Singh	Bharatiya Janata Party
9	5 December 2019	Chikkaballapur	Dr. K. Sudhakar	Indian National Congress	Dr. K. Sudhakar	Bharatiya Janata Party
10	5 December 2019	K.R. Puram	Byrati Basavaraj	Indian National Congress	Byrati Basavaraj	Bharatiya Janata Party
11	5 December 2019	Yeshvanthapura	S. T. Somashekhar	Indian National Congress	S. T. Somashekhar	Bharatiya Janata Party
12	5 December 2019	Ranibennur	R. Shankar	Karnataka Pragnyavantha Janatha Party	Arun Kumar Guththur	Bharatiya Janata Party
13	5 December 2019	Mahalakshmi Layout	K. Gopalaiah	Janata Dal (Secular)	K. Gopalaiah	Bharatiya Janata Party
14	5 December 2019	Krishnarajpet	Narayana Gowda	Janata Dal (Secular)	Narayana Gowda	Bharatiya Janata Party
15	5 December 2019	Hunsur	Adagur H. Vishwanath	Janata Dal (Secular)	H. P. Manjunath	Indian National Congress
16	5 December 2019	Shivajinagar	R. Roshan Baig	Indian National Congress	Rizwan Arshad	Indian National Congress
17	5 December 2019	Hosakote	M. T. B. Nagaraju	Indian National Congress	Sharath Kumar Bache Gowda	Independent

=== 2020 ===
S.No	Date	Constituency	MLA before election	Party before election	Elected MLA	Party after election
1	3 November 2020	Sira	B Sathyanarayana	Janata Dal (Secular)	Rajesh Gowda	Bharatiya Janata Party
2	3 November 2020	Rajarajeshwari Nagar	Munirathna	Indian National Congress	Munirathna	Bharatiya Janata Party

=== 2021 ===
S.No	Date	Constituency	MLA before election	Party before election	Elected MLA	Party after election
47	17 April 2021	Basavakalyan	B. Narayan Rao	Indian National Congress	Sharanu Salagar	Bharatiya Janata Party
59	17 April 2021	Maski	Pratapgouda Patil	Indian National Congress	Basangouda Turvihal	Indian National Congress
33	30 October 2021	Sindagi	Mallappa Managuli	Janata Dal (Secular)	Bhusanur Ramesh Balappa	Bharatiya Janata Party
82	30 October 2021	Hangal	C. M. Udasi	Bharatiya Janata Party	Srinivas Mane	Indian National Congress

== 16th Assembly ==
=== 2024 ===
Date	Constituency		Previous MLA		Reason	Elected MLA	
7 May 2024	36	Shorapur	Raja Venkatappa Naik	Indian National Congress	Died on 24 February 2024	Raja Venugopal Naik	Indian National Congress
13 November 2024	83	Shiggaon	Basavaraj Bommai	Bharatiya Janata Party	Elected to Lok Sabha on 4 June 2024	Yasir Ahmed Khan Pathan	Indian National Congress
13 November 2024	95	Sandur	E. Tukaram	Indian National Congress	Elected to Lok Sabha on 4 June 2024	E. Annapoorna Tukaram	Indian National Congress
13 November 2024	185	Channapatna	H. D. Kumaraswamy	Janata Dal (Secular)	Elected to Lok Sabha on 4 June 2024	C. P. Yogeshwara	Indian National Congress
