= 2019 Karnataka political crisis =

Political crisis in Indian state of Karnataka

- Date: July 2019
- Location: Karnataka, India
- Type: Parliamentary crisis
- Cause: Resignation of 17 legislators
- Participants: Bharatiya Janata Party; Indian National Congress; Janata Dal (Secular)
- Outcome: Fall of H. D. Kumaraswamy government; B. S. Yediyurappa sworn in as new Chief Minister

The 2019 Karnataka political crisis was a period of political instability when members of the legislative assembly in the Indian State of Karnataka submitted their resignations, which led to the fall of the Congress-JD(S) coalition government in the state.

== Background ==
In the 2018 elections to the Karnataka Legislative Assembly, the Bharatiya Janata Party (BJP) won the most seats, 104, but the Indian National Congress (INC) and Janata Dal (Secular) (JD(S)) formed a coalition government with 120 out of 224 seats. In the 2019 general election, the BJP-led NDA won 25 out of 28 seats in Karnataka while the INC-led UPA won two and the Independent Candidate won one.

== Resignations ==
On 1 July, two members, Ramesh Jarkiholi and Anand Singh of the INC submitted their resignations. Over the next few days, ten INC and three JD(S) legislators resigned.

The reaction of the coalition government was to attempt to convince the legislators who had submitted their resignations to rescind them. Many of the legislators fled to Mumbai, and directed the police not to permit INC leaders to meet them. The government also attempted to induce the legislators to return by offering them cabinet posts; all 21 INC ministers resigned on 8 July to ensure that a sufficient number of ministerial berths were available. It also requested that the speaker should disqualify those who had resigned under anti-defection legislation.

The speaker, K. R. Ramesh Kumar, did not immediately accept the resignations, on grounds that he was constitutionally obliged to scrutinize them. Consequently, some of those who had submitted their resignations approached the Supreme Court, which on 12 July agreed to hear the case on 16 July, whilst ordering the speaker not to disqualify any lawmakers or take any other action in this connection.

At the 16 July hearing, Mukul Rohatgi, counsel for the legislators who had submitted their resignations, said that the speaker should be ordered to rule immediately on the resignations. Rohatgi argued that disqualification was a "mini-trial", and so a decision on the resignations should take priority over one on disqualification. Rajeev Dhavan, who appeared for the Chief Minister of Karnataka, argued that the legislators never met the speaker, and consequently the speaker should rule on their disqualifications first. Ranjan Gogoi, the Chief Justice, said that the court would have to balance two competing claims: first, the excuse of resignation could not be used to circumvent anti-defection measures; but, second, claims of defection should not be used to prevent resignation. He also said that the court would have to consider the extent to which it is permitted to issue directions to holders of other constitutional posts, such as that of the speaker of the assembly.

=== Members responsible for the Crisis ===
14 INC and 3 JD(S) legislators were responsible for the political crisis. One Karnataka Pragnyavantha Janatha Party legislator also left the coalition government. A few days later, INC legislator Ramalinga Reddy withdrew his resignation.

=== List of members who took back resignation ===
SI No.	Constituency	Member	Party
1.	BTM Layout	Ramalinga Reddy	Indian National Congress

=== List of disqualified legislators ===
S.No	Constituency	Member	Party	2019 by-election results
1.	Ranebennur	R. Shankar	Karnataka Pragnyavantha Janatha Party	Did not contest. Won by BJP candidate Arunkumar Guththur
2.	Shivajinagar	R. Roshan Baig	Indian National Congress	Did not contest. Won by INC candidate Rizwan Arshad
3.	Maski (ST)	Pratap Gowda Patil	Indian National Congress	Lost to INC candidate Basanagouda Turvihal
4.	Hoskote	M. T. B. Nagaraju	Indian National Congress	Lost to Independent candidate Sharath Kumar Bachegowda
5.	Kagawad	Shrimant Balasaheb Patil	Indian National Congress	Won back seat as BJP candidate
6.	Krishnarajapuram	Byrati Basavaraj	Indian National Congress	Won back seat as BJP candidate
7.	Rajarajeshwari Nagar	Munirathna	Indian National Congress	Won back seat as BJP candidate
8.	Yeshvanthapura	S. T. Somashekhar	Indian National Congress	Won back seat as BJP candidate
9.	Gokak	Ramesh Jarkiholi	Indian National Congress	Won back seat as BJP candidate
10.	Vijayanagara	Anand Singh	Indian National Congress	Won back seat as BJP candidate
11.	Hirekerur	B. C. Patil	Indian National Congress	Won back seat as BJP candidate
12.	Athani	Mahesh Kumathalli	Indian National Congress	Won back seat as BJP candidate
13.	Chikkaballapur	Dr. K. Sudhakar	Indian National Congress	Won back seat as BJP candidate
14.	Yellapur	Arbail Shivaram Hebbar	Indian National Congress	Won back seat as BJP candidate
15.	Mahalakshmi Layout	K. Gopalaiah	Janata Dal (Secular)	Won back seat as BJP candidate
16.	Krishnarajpet	Narayana Gowda	Janata Dal (Secular)	Won back seat as BJP candidate
17.	Hunsur	Adagur H. Vishwanath	Janata Dal (Secular)	Lost to INC candidate H. P. Manjunath

== Reaction and conclusion ==
The INC members in the Rajya Sabha forced adjournments twice in protest, alleging bribery on the part of the BJP. The BJP demanded that the government should resign.

Eventually the Congress-JD(S) coalition was reduced to 101 seats, whilst the BJP retained 105. After three weeks of turmoil, Kumarasamy lost a trust vote and resigned. On 26 July 2019, B. S. Yediyurappa was sworn in as Chief Minister of Karnataka once again.

Vote of confidence
Head Count →	23 July 2019
Yes	99 / 206
No	105 / 206
Could not attend	2 / 206
Government resigned thereafter

== See also ==
- 2010s in political history
- 2018 Karnataka Legislative Assembly election
- 2019 Karnataka Legislative Assembly by-elections
