= 2019 Karnataka Legislative Assembly by-elections =

2019 Karnataka Legislative Assembly by-election
- 5 December 2019

15 vacant seats in the Karnataka Legislative Assembly
- Turnout: 70%
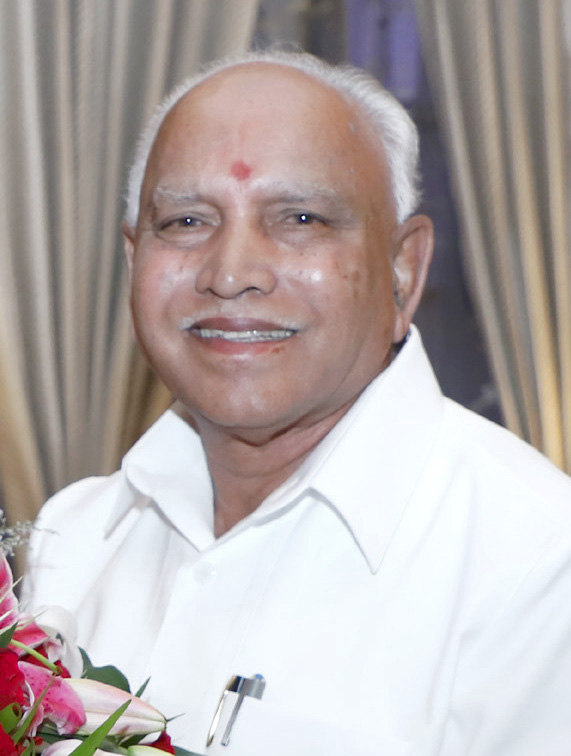

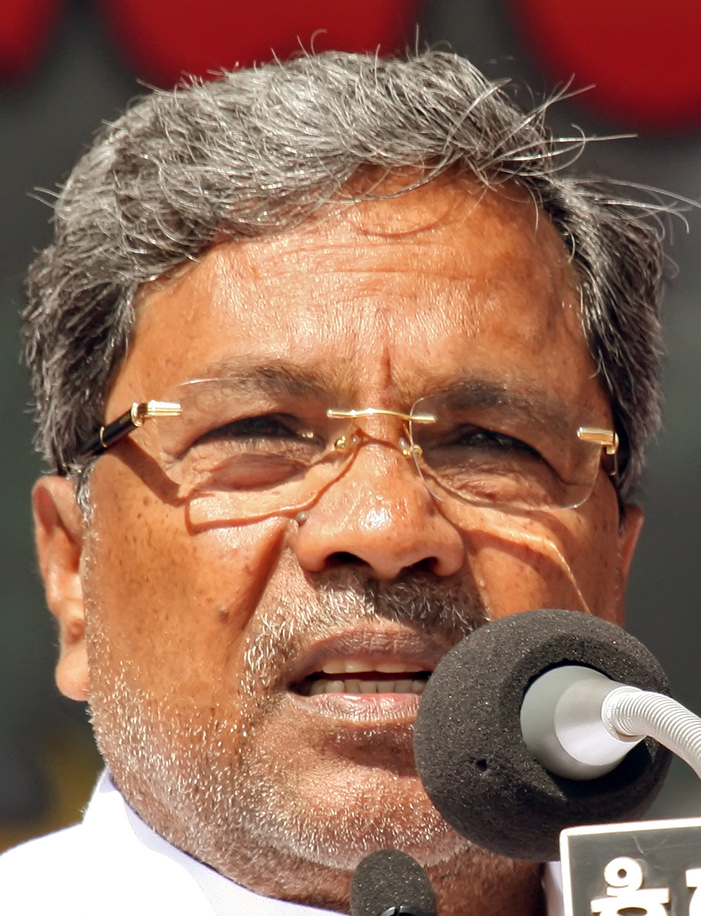

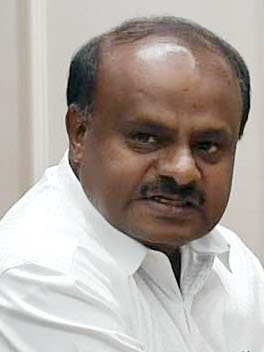
	Majority party	Minority party	Third party
Leader	B. S. Yediyurappa	Siddaramaiah	H. D. Kumaraswamy
Party	BJP	INC	JD(S)
Leader's seat	Shikaripura	Badami	Channapatna
Last election	0	11	3
Seats won	12	2	0
Seat change	▲12	▼9	▼3
Percentage	50.32%	31.50%	11.90%
Swing	▲18.82pp	▼13.96pp	▼4.87pp
Chief Minister before election
B. S. Yediyurappa
BJP
Chief Minister
B. S. Yediyurappa
BJP

By-elections to fifteen state assembly constituencies were held in Karnataka on 5 December 2019, and results were announced on 9 December. As the ruling party, BJP needed to win six of the 15 seats to maintain its majority. BJP won 12 seats, Congress won two, JD(S) failed to open its account, and one seat was won by a rebel BJP leader who contested as an independent.

== Election schedule ==
=== Scheduled ===
By-elections to fifteen state assembly constituencies were originally to be held on 21 October 2019 together with Haryana and Maharashtra Assembly elections. The counting of votes was to be on 24 October 2019.

Event	Date	Day
Date for nominations	23 Sep 2019	Monday
Last date for filing nominations	30 Sep 2019	Monday
Date for scrutiny of nominations	1 Oct 2019	Tuesday
Last date for withdrawal of candidatures	3 Oct 2019	Thursday
Date of poll	21 Oct 2019	Monday
Date of counting	24 Oct 2019	Thursday
Date before which the election shall be completed	24 Oct 2019	Sunday

=== Rescheduled ===
The Election Commission on 27 September rescheduled the by-elections to 15 Karnataka assembly constituencies to 5 December, and would declare the results no later than 11 December.

Event	Date	Day
Date for nominations	11 Nov 2019	Monday
Last date for filing nominations	18 Nov 2019	Monday
Date for scrutiny of nominations	19 Nov 2019	Tuesday
Last date for withdrawal of candidatures	21 Nov 2019	Thursday
Date of poll	5 Dec 2019	Thursday
Date of counting	9 Dec 2019	Monday
Date before which the election shall be completed	11 Dec 2019	Wednesday

== List of candidates ==
Constituency							
Constituency		BJP		INC		JD(S)	
3	Athani	BJP	Mahesh Kumathalli	INC	Gajanan Bhalachandra Mangasuli	Did not contest	
4	Kagwad	BJP	Shrimant Patil	INC	Bharamgouda Alagouda Kage	JD(S)	Kallappa Paris Magennavar
9	Gokak	BJP	Ramesh Jarkiholi	INC	Lakhan Laxmanrao Jarkiholi	Did not contest	
81	Yellapur	BJP	Arbail Shivaram Hebbar	INC	Bhimanna T. Naik	JD(S)	Ravindra A. Naik
86	Hirekerur	BJP	B. C. Patil	INC	B. H. Bannikod	Did not contest	
87	Ranibennur	BJP	Arunkumar Guttur	INC	K. B. Koliwad	Did not contest	
90	Vijayanagara	BJP	Anand Singh	INC	V. Y. Ghorpade	JD(S)	N. M. Nabi
141	Chikballapur	BJP	K. Sudhakar	INC	M. Anjinappa	JD(S)	M. Radhakrishna
151	K. R. Pura	BJP	Byrati Basavaraj	INC	M. Narayanaswamy	JD(S)	C. Krishnamurthy
153	Yeshvanthapura	BJP	S. T. Somashekhar	INC	T. N. Javarayi Gowda	JD(S)	P. Nagaraj
156	Mahalakshmi Layout	BJP	K. Gopalaiah	INC	M. Shivaraju	JD(S)	Girish K. Nashi
162	Shivajinagar	BJP	M. Saravana	INC	Rizwan Arshad	JD(S)	Tanveer Ahmed Ullah
178	Hosakote	BJP	M. T. B. Nagaraj	INC	Padmavathi Suresh	Did not contest	
192	Krishnarajpete	BJP	Narayana Gowda	INC	K. B. Chandrashekar	JD(S)	B. L. Devaraj
212	Hunasuru	BJP	Adagur H. Vishwanath	INC	H. P. Manjunath	JD(S)	Devarahalli Somashekara

== Surveys and polls ==
=== Seat projections ===
Poll type	Publishing date	Polling agency					Majority
Poll type	Publishing date	Polling agency	BJP	INC	JD(S)	Others	Majority
Exit polls	5 December 2019	Karnataka Power TV	8-12	3-6	0-2	0-1	1-5
Exit polls	5 December 2019	BTV	9	3	2	1	2
Exit polls	5 December 2019	Public TV	8-10	3-5	1-2	0-1	1-3

== Results ==
=== Results by party ===
Party	Vote share		Votes		Seats		
Party	%	+/-%	No.	+/-	No.	%	+/-
Bharatiya Janata Party (BJP)	50.32	▲18.82	1,291,049	▲457,696	12	80.00	▲12
Indian National Congress (INC)	31.50	▼13.96	808,114	▼394,560	2	13.33	▼9
Janata Dal (Secular) (JD(S))	11.90	▼4.87	305,307	▼138,325	0	0.00	▼3
Uttama Prajaakeeya Party (UPP)	0.43	▲0.43	10,928	▲10,928	0	0.00	0
Karnataka Rashtra Samithi (KRS)	0.11	▲0.11	2,714	▲2,714	0	0.00	0
Bahujan Samaj Party (BSP)	0.09	▲0.09	2,417	▲2,417	0	0.00	0
Independent (IND)	4.27	▲2.01	109,530	▲49,852	1	6.67	▲1
Others	0.38	▼2.84	9,671	▲75,531	0	0.00	▼1
None of the Above (NOTA)	0.94	▲0.17	24,073	▲3,599			
Source: Karnataka CEO

=== Results by constituency ===
S.no	Assembly constituency		Winner			Runner-up			Margin
S.no	No.	Name	Candidate	Party	Votes	Candidate	Party	Votes	Margin
1	3	Athani	Mahesh Kumathalli	Bharatiya Janata Party	99,203	Gajanan Bhalachandra Mangasuli	Indian National Congress	59,214	39,989
2	4	Kagwad	Shrimant Balasaheb Patil	Bharatiya Janata Party	76,952	Bharamgouda Alagouda Kage	Indian National Congress	58,395	18,557
3	9	Gokak	Jarkiholi Ramesh Laxmanrao	Bharatiya Janata Party	87,450	Lakhan Laxmanrao Jarkiholi	Indian National Congress	58,444	29,006
4	81	Yellapur	Arabail Hebbar Shivaram	Bharatiya Janata Party	80,442	Bhimanna T. Naik	Indian National Congress	49,034	31,408
5	86	Hirekerur	B.C. Patil	Bharatiya Janata Party	85,562	Bannikod Basappa Hanumantappa	Indian National Congress	56,495	29,067
6	87	Ranebennur	Arunkumar Guththur (M M P)	Bharatiya Janata Party	95,438	K B Koliwad	Indian National Congress	72,216	23,222
7	90	Vijayanagara	Anand Singh	Bharatiya Janata Party	85,477	V.Y. Ghorpade	Indian National Congress	55,352	30,125
8	141	Chikkaballapur	K. Sudhakar	Bharatiya Janata Party	84,389	M. Anjanappa	Indian National Congress	49,588	34,801
9	151	Krishnarajapuram	B.A.Basavaraja	Bharatiya Janata Party	1,39,879	M.Narayanaswamy	Indian National Congress	76,436	63,443
10	153	Yeshvanthapura	S. T. Somashekar	Bharatiya Janata Party	1,44,722	T.N. Javarayi Gowda	Janata Dal (Secular)	1,17,023	27,699
11	156	Mahalakshmi Layout	K Gopalaiah	Bharatiya Janata Party	85,889	M. Shivaraju	Indian National Congress	31,503	54,386
12	162	Shivajinagar	Rizwan Arshad	Indian National Congress	49,890	M. Saravana	Bharatiya Janata Party	36,369	13,521
13	178	Hoskote	Sharath Kumar Bachegowda	Independent	81,671	M T B Nagaraj	Bharatiya Janata Party	70,185	13,521
14	192	Krishnarajpet	Narayan Gowda	Bharatiya Janata Party	66,094	B. L. Devaraj	Janata Dal (Secular)	56,363	9,731
15	212	Hunsur	H. P. Manjunath	Indian National Congress	92,725	Adagur H. Vishwanath	Bharatiya Janata Party	52,998	39,727

=== Gains by BJP ===
The bypolls were required after 15 MLAs, from Congress and Janata Dal (S), resigned to bring down Kumaraswamy's coalition government.

BJP won 12 of the available 15 seats. After Roshan Beg from Shivajinagar had resigned, BJP did not allow him to join them; Beg was unable to contest the bypoll and Congress retained the seat.

From Hoskote, MTB Nagaraj resigned his seat and joined BJP, who had nominated him from his former seat. Nagaraj was challenged by a BJP rebel, who won the seat.

From Hunsur (Hunasuru), Adagur Vishwanath had previously won on JD(S) ticket, defeating Manjunath of Congress. Vishwanath resigned and contested as a BJP candidate, but Manjunath managed to win the seat for Congress.

== See also ==
- Elections in Karnataka
- Government of Karnataka
- Karnataka Legislative Assembly
