= Third Yediyurappa ministry =

Government of Karnataka, India (2019–2021)

- 32nd Council of Ministers of Karnataka State
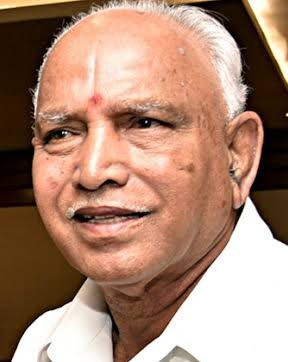
- B. S. Yediyurappa; Chief Minister of Karnataka
- Date formed: 26 July 2019
- Date dissolved: 26 July 2021

People and organisations
- Head of state: Vajubhai Vala (1 September 2014 – 10 July 2021); Thawar Chand Gehlot (11 July 2021 – Present)
- Head of government: B. S. Yediyurappa
- Deputy head of government: C. N. Ashwath Narayan; Laxman Savadi; Govind M. Karjol
- No. of ministers: 32
- Ministers removed: 2
- Member parties: BJP
- Status in legislature: Majority
- Opposition party: INC JD(S)
- Opposition leader: Siddaramaiah(assembly)

History
- Election: 2018
- Legislature terms: 6 years (Council); 5 years (Assembly)
- Predecessor: Second Kumaraswamy ministry
- Successor: Basavaraj Bommai ministry

B. S. Yediyurappa formed his third ministry (Council of Ministers) in July 2019 in Karnataka, a state in South India, after the INC-Janata Dal (Secular) coalition government collapsed due to defections to the BJP.

The ministry had 33 ministers when dissolved, including the Chief Minister. Out of the 33 ministers including the Chief Minister, all belonged to the BJP.

== Council of Ministers ==
Portfolio	Minister	Took office	Left office	Party
Chief Minister; Finance; Department Personnel & Administrative Reforms; Energy; Bangalore Development; Cabinet Affairs; Intelligence; Other departments not allocated to any Minister	B. S. Yediyurappa	26 July 2019	28 July 2021	BJP
Deputy Chief Minister	Govind Karjol	20 August 2019	28 July 2021	BJP
Deputy Chief Minister	C. N. Ashwath Narayan	20 August 2019	28 July 2021	BJP
Deputy Chief Minister	Laxman Savadi	20 August 2019	28 July 2021	BJP
Minister of Public Works Department	Govind Karjol	20 August 2019	28 July 2021	BJP
Minister of Social Welfare	Govind Karjol	20 August 2019	12 October 2020	BJP
Minister of Social Welfare	B. Sriramulu	12 October 2020	28 July 2021	BJP
Minister of Higher Education; Minister of Science & Technology; Minister of IT & BT	C. N. Ashwath Narayan	20 August 2019	28 July 2021	BJP
Minister of Transport	Laxman Savadi	20 August 2019	28 July 2021	BJP
Minister of Rural Development & Panchayat Raj	K. S. Eshwarappa	20 August 2019	28 July 2021	BJP
Minister of Revenue	R. Ashoka	20 August 2019	28 July 2021	BJP
Minister of Large & Medium Industries	Jagadish Shettar	20 August 2019	28 July 2021	BJP
Minister of Health & Family Welfare	B. Sriramulu	20 August 2019	12 October 2020	BJP
Minister of Health & Family Welfare	Dr. Sudhakar	12 October 2020	28 July 2021	BJP
Minister of Primary & Secondary Education	S. Suresh Kumar	20 August 2019	28 July 2021	BJP
Minister of Housing	V. Somanna	20 August 2019	28 July 2021	BJP
Minister of Tourism	C. T. Ravi	20 August 2019	4 October 2020	BJP
Minister of Tourism	C. P. Yogeeshwara	21 January 2021	28 July 2021	BJP
Minister of Kannada & Culture	C. T. Ravi	20 August 2019	4 October 2020	BJP
Minister of Kannada & Culture	Arvind Limbavali	21 January 2021	28 July 2021	BJP
Minister of Home Affairs	Basavaraj Bommai	20 August 2019	28 July 2021	BJP
Minister of Muzrai	Kota Srinivas Poojary	20 August 2019	28 July 2021	BJP
Minister of Ports & Inland Transport; Minister of Fisheries	Kota Srinivas Poojary	20 August 2019	21 January 2021	BJP
Minister of Ports & Inland Transport; Minister of Fisheries	Angara S.	21 January 2021	28 July 2021	BJP
Minister of Minor Irrigation	J. C. Madhu Swamy	20 August 2019	28 July 2021	BJP
Minister of Law; Minister of Parliamentary Affairs & Legislation	J. C. Madhu Swamy	20 August 2019	21 January 2021	BJP
Minister of Law; Minister of Parliamentary Affairs & Legislation	Basavaraj Bommai	21 January 2021	28 July 2021	BJP
Minister of Mines & Geology	C. C. Patil	20 August 2019	21 January 2021	BJP
Minister of Mines & Geology	Murugesh Nirani	21 January 2021	28 July 2021	BJP
Minister of Excise	H. Nagesh	20 August 2019	13 January 2021	Independent
Minister of Excise	K. Gopalaiah	21 January 2021	28 July 2021	BJP
Minister of Animal Husbandry	Prabhu Chauhan	20 August 2019	28 July 2021	BJP
Minister of Women & Child Development	Shashikala Annasaheb Jolle	20 August 2019	28 July 2021	BJP
Minister of Medical Education	C. N. Ashwath Narayan	27 September 2019	10 February 2020	BJP
Minister of Medical Education	Dr K. Sudhakar	10 February 2020	28 July 2021	BJP
Minister of Agriculture	Laxman Savadi	27 September 2019	10 February 2020	BJP
Minister of Agriculture	B. C. Patil	10 February 2020	28 July 2021	BJP
Minister of Youth Empowerment & Sports	K. S. Eshwarappa	27 September 2019	10 February 2020	BJP
Minister of Youth Empowerment & Sports	C. T. Ravi	10 February 2020	4 October 2020	BJP
Minister of Youth Empowerment & Sports	Narayana Gowda	21 January 2021	28 July 2021	BJP
Minister of Municipal Administration	R. Ashoka	27 September 2019	10 February 2020	BJP
Minister of Municipal Administration	Narayana Gowda	10 February 2020	21 January 2021	BJP
Minister of Municipal Administration	M. T. B. Nagaraj	21 January 2021	28 July 2021	BJP
Minister of Public Enterprises	Jagadish Shettar	27 September 2019	28 July 2021	BJP
Minister of Backward Class Welfare	B. Sriramulu	27 September 2019	12 October 2020	BJP
Minister of Backward Class Welfare	Kota Srinivas Poojary	21 January 2021	28 July 2021	BJP
Minister of Labour	S. Suresh Kumar	27 September 2019	10 February 2020	BJP
Minister of Labour	Arbail Shivaram Hebbar	10 February 2020	28 July 2021	BJP
Minister of Horticulture; Minister of Sericulture	V. Somanna	27 September 2019	10 February 2020	BJP
Minister of Horticulture; Minister of Sericulture	Narayana Gowda	10 February 2020	21 January 2021	BJP
Minister of Horticulture; Minister of Sericulture	R. Shankar	21 January 2021	28 July 2021	BJP
Minister of Sugarcane Development & Directorate	C. T. Ravi	27 September 2019	10 February 2020	BJP
Minister of Sugarcane Development & Directorate	Arbail Shivaram Hebbar	10 February 2020	21 January 2021	BJP
Minister of Sugarcane Development & Directorate	M. T. B. Nagaraj	21 January 2021	28 July 2021	BJP
Minister of Co-operation	Basavaraj Bommai	27 September 2019	10 February 2020	BJP
Minister of Co-operation	S. T. Somashekhar	10 February 2020	28 July 2021	BJP
Minister of Ecology & Environment	C. C. Patil	27 September 2019	10 February 2020	BJP
Minister of Ecology & Environment	Anand Singh	10 February 2020	21 January 2021	BJP
Minister of Ecology & Environment	C. P. Yogeeshwara	21 January 2021	28 July 2021	BJP
Minister of Forest	C. C. Patil	27 September 2019	10 February 2020	BJP
Minister of Forest	Anand Singh	10 February 2020	21 January 2021	BJP
Minister of Forest	Arvind Limbavali	21 January 2021	28 July 2021	BJP
Minister of Skill Development, Entrepreneurship & Livelihood	H. Nagesh	27 September 2019	10 February 2020	Independent
Minister of Skill Development, Entrepreneurship & Livelihood	C. N. Ashwath Narayan	10 February 2020	28 July 2021	BJP
Minister of Haj & Wakf	Prabhu Chauhan	27 September 2019	21 January 2021	BJP
Minister of Haj & Wakf	Anand Singh	21 January 2021	28 July 2021	BJP
Minister of Minority Welfare	Prabhu Chauhan	27 September 2019	10 February 2020	BJP
Minister of Minority Welfare	Shrimant Patil	10 February 2020	28 July 2021	BJP
Minister of Food, Civil Supplies & Consumer Affairs	Shashikala Annasaheb Jolle	27 September 2019	10 February 2020	BJP
Minister of Food, Civil Supplies & Consumer Affairs	K. Gopalaiah	10 February 2020	21 January 2021	BJP
Minister of Food, Civil Supplies & Consumer Affairs	Umesh Katti	21 January 2021	28 July 2021	BJP
Minister of Major & Medium Irrigation	Ramesh Jarkiholi	10 February 2020	3 March 2021	BJP
Minister of Urban Development	Byrati Basavaraj	10 February 2020	28 July 2021	BJP
Minister of Textiles	Shrimant Patil	10 February 2020	28 July 2021	BJP
Minister of Small Scale Industries; Minister of Information & Public Relations	C. C. Patil	21 January 2021	28 July 2021	BJP
Minister of Planning, Programme Monitoring & Statistics	Narayana Gowda	21 January 2021	28 July 2021	BJP
Minister of Infrastructure Development	Anand Singh	21 January 2021	28 July 2021	BJP

If any department is vacant for any length of time, it automatically comes under the charge of the Chief Minister.

=== District Wise break up ===
Representation of cabinet ministers by state
1. Bagalkot (6.25%)
2. Bangalore Urban (25.0%)
3. Bangalore Rural (3.12%)
4. Belgaum (12.5%)
5. Bellary (3.12%)
6. Bidar (3.12%)
7. Chikkballapur (3.12%)
8. Chitradurga (3.12%)
9. Dakshina Kannada (3.12%)
10. Dharwad (3.12%)
11. Gadag (3.12%)
12. Haveri (9.38%)
13. Ramanagara (3.12%)
14. Mandya (3.12%)
15. Shimoga (6.25%)
16. Tumkur (3.12%)
17. Udupi (3.12%)
18. Uttara Kannada (3.12%)

District	Cabinet Ministers	Name of ministers
Bagalkot	2	Govind Karjol; Murugesh Nirani
Bangalore Urban	8	R. Ashoka; S. Suresh Kumar; Arvind Limbavali; C. N. Ashwath Narayan; V. Somanna; S. T. Somashekhar; Byrati Basavaraj; K. Gopalaiah
Bangalore Rural	1	M. T. B. Nagaraj (MLC)
Belgaum	4	Laxman Savadi (MLC); Umesh Katti; Shashikala Jolle; Shrimant Patil
Bellary	1	Anand Singh
Bidar	1	Prabhu Chauhan
Bijapur	—	—
Chamarajanagar	—	—
Chikkaballapura	1	K. Sudhakar
Chikmagalur	—	—
Chitradurga	1	B. Sriramulu
Dakshina Kannada	1	Angara S.
Davanangere	—	—
Dharwad	1	Jagadish Shettar
Gadag	1	C. C. Patil
Gulbarga	—	—
Hassan	—	—
Haveri	3	Basavaraj Bommai; B. C. Patil; R. Shankar (MLC)
Kodagu	—	—
Kolar	—	—
Koppal	—	—
Mandya	1	Narayana Gowda
Mysore	—	—
Raichur	—	—
Ramanagara	1	C. P. Yogeeshwara (MLC)
Shimoga	2	B. S. Yediyurappa; K. S. Eshwarappa
Tumkur	1	J. C. Madhu Swamy
Udupi	1	Kota Srinivas Poojary (MLC)
Uttara Kannada	1	Arbail Shivaram Hebbar
Yadgir	—	—
Total	32	

== See also ==
- Karnataka Legislative Assembly
- 2019 Karnataka resignation crisis
