= Second Kumaraswamy ministry =

Government of Karnataka, India (2018–19)

- 31st Ministry of the State of Karnataka
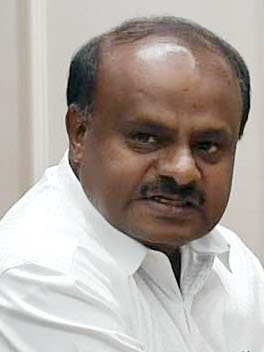
- H. D. Kumaraswamy; Hon'ble Chief Minister of Karnataka
- Date formed: 23 May 2018
- Date dissolved: 23 July 2019

People and organisations
- Head of state: Vajubhai Vala (1 September 2014 – 10 July 2021)
- Head of government: H. D. Kumaraswamy
- Deputy head of government: Dr. G. Parameshwara
- No. of ministers: 2
- Ministers removed: 34
- Member parties: INC; JD(S)
- Status in legislature: Coalition
- Opposition party: BJP
- Opposition leader: B. S. Yeddyurappa (assembly)

History
- Election: 2018
- Legislature term: 1 year 2 months
- Predecessor: First Siddaramaiah ministry
- Successor: Third Yediyurappa ministry

The Second H. D. Kumaraswamy ministry was the Council of Ministers in Karnataka, a state in South India headed by H. D. Kumaraswamy that was formed after the 2018 Karnataka Legislative Assembly elections.

In the government headed by H. D. Kumaraswamy, the Chief Minister was from JD(S) while Deputy Chief Minister was from INC. Apart from the CM & Deputy CM, there were 32 ministers in the government, but all the 32 ministers resigned from their posts in July 2019 due to political turmoil in Karnataka.

== Tenure of the Government ==
After the 2018 assembly elections, BJP emerged as the single largest party with 104 seats, followed by the INC with 78 seats and JD(S) with 37 seats. INC extended the support to JD(S) to form the government. Governor Vajubhai Vala invited BJP to form the government and B. S. Yeddyurappa was sworn in as the Chief Minister. But B. S. Yeddyurappa could not prove the majority of his government and resigned after 2 days of being sworn in. After that, H. D. Kumaraswamy of the JD(S) was sworn in as the Chief Minister, with the support of INC, BSP, KPJP and IND MLA. INC MLA Dr. G. Parameshwara was sworn in as the Deputy Chief Minister, along with Chief Minister H. D. Kumaraswamy. On 6 June 2018, 25 ministers were inducted in the cabinet.

In July 2019, 13 MLAs from the INC and 3 MLAs from the JD(S) resigned from the assembly, thus pushing the government to a minority. 1 KPJP and 1 IND MLA also withdrew their support from the government and extended their support to BJP. The rebel MLAs left Bangalore and camped in a resort in Mumbai. To pacify the disgruntled MLAs, 32 ministers, excluding the Chief Minister and Deputy Chief Minister, resigned from the ministerial posts. On 18 July, Chief Minister H. D. Kumaraswamy moved the trust vote in the house. Finally on 23 July, after 3 days long debate, the trust vote was put for voting, in which 204 members participated in the voting process. The government lost the majority by getting 99 votes, compared to the 105 votes of the BJP, after which Chief Minister H. D. Kumaraswamy resigned from the post.

== Council of Ministers ==
| SI No. | Name | Constituency | Department | Party |
|---|---|---|---|---|
| 1. | H. D. Kumaraswamy; Chief Minister | Channapatna | Minister of Finance, Personnel & Administrative reforms, Intelligence wing from Home, Energy, Public enterprises, Infrastructure development, Textile, Excise, Information and Planning & Statistics. Other departments not allocated to a Minister. | JD(S) |
| 2. | Dr. G Parameshwara; Deputy Chief Minister | Koratagere | Minister of Bengaluru Development, Law and Parliamentary affairs, IT & BT and Science & Technology. | INC |

=== Former Members ===
On 8 July 2019, 32 ministers resigned from their posts after the political turmoil in state. But their resignation was not accepted, although the chief minister's office announced that the ministers have resigned.

| SI No. | Name | Constituency | Department | Tenure | Reason | Party |
|---|---|---|---|---|---|---|
| 1. | Ramesh Jarkiholi | Gokak | Minister of Municipal administration. | 6 June 2018 – 22 December 2018 | Removed | INC |
| 2. | N. Mahesh | Kollegal | Minister of Primary and Secondary education. | 6 June 2018 – 11 October 2018 | Resigned | BSP |
| 3. | C. S. Shivalli | Kundgol | Minister of Municipalities and Local bodies. | 22 December 2018 – 22 March 2019 | Death | INC |
| 4. | H. Nagesh | Mulbagal | Minister of Small scale industries. | 14 June 2019 – 8 July 2019 | Resigned | IND |
| 5. | D. K. Shivakumar | Kanakapura | Minister of Major & Medium Irrigation, Kannada & Culture and Information & Public relations. | 6 June 2018 – 8 July 2019 | Resigned | INC |
| 6. | R.V. Deshpande | Haliyal | Minister of Revenue. | 6 June 2018 – 8 July 2019 | Resigned | INC |
| 7. | K. J. George | Sarvagnanagar | Minister of Large & Medium scale industries. | 6 June 2018 – 8 July 2019 | Resigned | INC |
| 8. | Jayamala | MLC | Minister of Women & Child development and empowerment of differently abled & senior citizens. | 6 June 2018 – 8 July 2019 | Resigned | INC |
| 9. | Krishna Byre Gowda | Byatarayanapura | Minister of Rural development and Panchayat Raj institutions. | 6 June 2018 – 8 July 2019 | Resigned | INC |
| 10. | N. H. Shivashankara Reddy | Gauribidanur | Minister of Agriculture. | 6 June 2018 – 8 July 2019 | Resigned | INC |
| 11. | Priyank M. Kharge | Chittapur | Minister of Social welfare. | 6 June 2018 – 8 July 2019 | Resigned | INC |
| 12. | U. T. Khader | Mangalore | Minister of City corporations and Urban development authorities. | 6 June 2018 – 8 July 2019 | Resigned | INC |
| 13. | Zameer Ahmed Khan | Chamrajpet | Minister of Food & civil supplies and Minority welfare. | 6 June 2018 – 8 July 2019 | Resigned | INC |
| 14. | Shivanand Patil | Basavana Bagevadi | Minister of Health & Family welfare. | 6 June 2018 – 8 July 2019 | Resigned | INC |
| 15. | Venkata Ramanappa | Pavagada | Minister of Labour. | 6 June 2018 – 8 July 2019 | Resigned | INC |
| 16. | Rajashekar B Patil | Humnabad | Minister of Mines and Geology. | 6 June 2018 – 8 July 2019 | Resigned | INC |
| 17. | C Puttaranga Shetty | Chamarajanagar | Minister of Backward classes welfare. | 6 June 2018 – 8 July 2019 | Resigned | INC |
| 18. | M. B. Patil | Babaleshwar | Minister of Home affairs. | 22 December 2018 – 8 July 2019 | Resigned | INC |
| 19. | Satish; Jarkiholi | Yemakanmardi | Minister of Forest, Ecology and Environment. | 22 December 2018 – 8 July 2019 | Resigned | INC |
| 20. | Rahim Khan | Bidar | Minister of Youth empowerment and Sports. | 22 December 2018 – 8 July 2019 | Resigned | INC |
| 21. | R. B. Timmapur | MLC | Minister of Sugar, Port and Inland transport. | 22 December 2018 – 8 July 2019 | Resigned | INC |
| 22. | E. Tukaram | Sanduru | Minister of Medical education. | 22 December 2018 – 8 July 2019 | Resigned | INC |
| 23. | M. T. B. Nagaraj | Hosakote | Minister of Housing. | 22 December 2018 – 8 July 2019 | Resigned | INC |
| 24. | P. T. Parameshwar Naik | Hoovina; Hadagali | Minister of Muzzarai, Skill development, Entrepreneurship and Livelihood. | 22 December 2018 – 8 July 2019 | Resigned | INC |
| 25. | H. D. Revanna | Holenarasipur | Minister of Public Works Department. | 6 June 2018 – 8 July 2019 | Resigned | JD(S) |
| 26. | M. C. Managuli | Sindagi | Minister of Horticulture. | 6 June 2018 – 8 July 2019 | Resigned | JD(S) |
| 27. | Bandeppa Kashempur | Bidar South | Minister of Cooperation. | 6 June 2018 – 8 July 2019 | Resigned | JD(S) |
| 28. | GT Devegowda | Chamundeshwari | Minister of Higher education. | 6 June 2018 – 8 July 2019 | Resigned | JD(S) |
| 29. | D. C. Thammanna | Maddur | Minister of Transport. | 6 June 2018 – 8 July 2019 | Resigned | JD(S) |
| 30. | S. R. Srinivas | Gubbi | Minister of Primary and secondary education. | 6 June 2018 – 8 July 2019 | Resigned | JD(S) |
| 31. | Venkatarao Nadagouda | Sindhanur | Minister of Animal Husbandry and Fisheries. | 6 June 2018 – 8 July 2019 | Resigned | JD(S) |
| 32. | C. S. Puttaraju | Melukote | Minister of Minor irrigation. | 6 June 2018 – 8 July 2019 | Resigned | JD(S) |
| 33. | Sa. Ra. Mahesh | Krishnarajanagara | Minister of Tourism and Sericulture. | 6 June 2018 – 8 July 2019 | Resigned | JD(S) |
| 34. | R. Shankar | Ranebennur | Minister of Municipalities and Local bodies. | 14 June 2019 – 8 July 2019 | Resigned | KPJP |

== See also ==
- Karnataka Legislative Assembly
- 2019 Karnataka resignation crisis
