= Bharamgouda Alagouda Kage =

Indian politician

Raju Kage

Member of Karnataka Legislative Assembly
- Incumbent
- Assumed office 2023
- Preceded by: Shrimant Patil
- Constituency: Kagwad
- In office 2000–2018
- Preceded by: Pasagouda Urf Popat Appagoda Patil
- Succeeded by: Shrimant Patil
- Constituency: Kagwad

Personal details
- Born: 21 May 1958 (age 67) Kudachi, Belgaum
- Party: Indian National Congress (2019–present)
- Other political affiliations: Bharatiya Janata Party (2003–2019), Janata Dal (United) (1999–2003), Independent (1998–1999), Janata Dal (1988–1998), Janata Party (till 1988)
- Occupation: Farmer, politician

Bharamgouda Alagouda Kage or Raju Kage is an Indian politician from Karnataka. He is currently serving as member of Karnataka Legislative Assembly representing Kagwad.

He was elected to the Karnataka Legislative Assembly from Kagwad 4 times consecutively before getting defeated by Shrimant Patil twice in 2018 Assembly election and 2019 by-election.

He was appointed chairman for Northwest Transport Corporation on 26 January 2024.

== Education ==
He completed B.Sc. graduation from R.L.S. College, Belagavi affiliated with Karnatak University, Dharwad in 1980.

== Political career ==
He contested from Athani as a Janata Party candidate and was defeated by Pawar Desai Sidharaj of Indian National Congress in 1983. He became a member of Gram Panchayat in 1993. He was elected to Belagavi Zilla Panchayat in 1995. He contested from Kagwad in 1999 as an Independent candidate and was defeated by Pasagouda Urf Popat Appagoda Patil of Indian National Congress. He was elected to the Karnataka Legislative Assembly from Kagwad for the first time in the 2000 Karnataka Legislative Assembly by-election as Janata Dal (United) candidate. Later he joined Bharatiya Janata Party and was elected from the same constituency in 2004, 2008, 2013. He was defeated by Shrimant Patil of Indian National Congress in 2018 Assembly Elections. Meanwhile Shrimant Patil resigned and contested again in 2019 Karnataka Legislative Assembly by-elections on BJP ticket. Raju Kage had joined Indian National Congress and was defeated by Shrimant Patil who contested from Bharatiya Janata Party.

== Arrest ==
He was arrested for attacking a Congress worker in Belagavi in 2017.
