= S. Suresh Kumar =

Indian politician

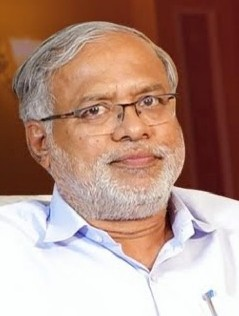

Minister of Primary & Secondary Education Government of Karnataka
- In office 20 August 2019 – 28 July 2021
- Chief Minister: B. S. Yediyurappa
- Preceded by: S. R. Srinivas
- Succeeded by: B. C. Nagesh

Minister of Labour Government of Karnataka
- In office 27 September 2019 – 10 February 2020
- Chief Minister: B. S. Yediyurappa
- Preceded by: Venkataramanappa
- Succeeded by: Arbail Shivaram Hebbar

Minister of Law & Parliamentary Affairs Government of Karnataka
- In office 30 May 2008 – 13 May 2013
- Chief Minister: B. S. Yediyurappa; Sadananda Gowda; Jagadish Shettar
- Preceded by: M. P. Prakash
- Succeeded by: T. B. Jayachandra

Minister of Urban Development Government of Karnataka
- In office 30 May 2008 – 13 May 2013
- Chief Minister: B. S. Yediyurappa; Sadananda Gowda; Jagadish Shettar
- Preceded by: H. D. Kumaraswamy
- Succeeded by: Vinay Kumar Sorake

Member of Karnataka Legislative Assembly
- Incumbent
- Assumed office 25 May 2008
- Preceded by: N. L. Narendra Babu
- Constituency: Rajaji Nagar
- In office 1994–2004
- Succeeded by: N. L. Narendra Babu
- Constituency: Rajaji Nagar

Personal details
- Born: 11 November 1955 (age 71) Bangalore, Mysore State, India
- Party: Bharatiya Janata party

S. Suresh Kumar (born 11 November 1955) is an Indian Bharatiya Janata Party politician who was the Minister of state for Primary & Secondary Education and Sakala of Karnataka from 20 August 2019 to 26 July 2021. He was the Minister of state for Law & Parliamentary Affairs of Karnataka from 7 June 2008 to 13 May 2013.

Born in Bengaluru, he was associated with the Rashtriya Swayamsevak Sangh from a very young age. He finished his graduation in Science from Bangalore University. Due to his active opposition to the Emergency, he was imprisoned in the Bangalore Central jail, where many national and state level leaders were also being detained. After being released from jail, he did his graduation in law from Bangalore University, 1977–1980. He started his career as an advocate in 1981. He enrolled himself to the Bar Council and practiced law for some time before taking a plunge into active politics.

He was first elected to the Bengaluru Mahanagara Palike in 1983 by the BJP and served as corporator for 2 consecutive terms. He was elected to the Karnataka Legislative Assembly from Rajajinagar constituency for 2 terms in 1994 and 1999 and was hailed as a model legislator. He was re-elected to the Karnataka Legislative Assembly during 2008 and 2013 polls.

He was elected to a third term in 2008 and was appointed Minister for Law, Urban Development, Parliamentary Affairs and BWSSB in the Yeddyurappa government.

== Positions held ==
- A two-time Corporator in the Bengaluru City Corporation (1983 & 1990)
- Leader of BJP group in the corporation.
- President of Bangalore City BJP in 1988-1990
- Elected MLA : 1994, 1999, 2008, 2013, 2018, 2023
- Deputy leader of BJP group during 1997–1999;
- President of State BJP Yuva Morcha- 1991;
- State Spokesperson during 1996 and 2004
- General Secretary during 2005–2008.
- Elected to 13th Karnataka Legislative Assembly from Rajajinagar Constituency.
- Cabinet Minister, Government of Karnataka 2008
- Leader of the House, Vidhana Sabha 2011
- Elected to Karnataka Vidhan Sabha from Rajajinagar Constituency in 2018 elections.
- Appointed Education Minister in the Fourth Yediyurappa ministry in July 2019
