= C. N. Ashwath Narayan =

10th Deputy Chief Minister of Karnataka, India

C. N. Ashwathnarayan
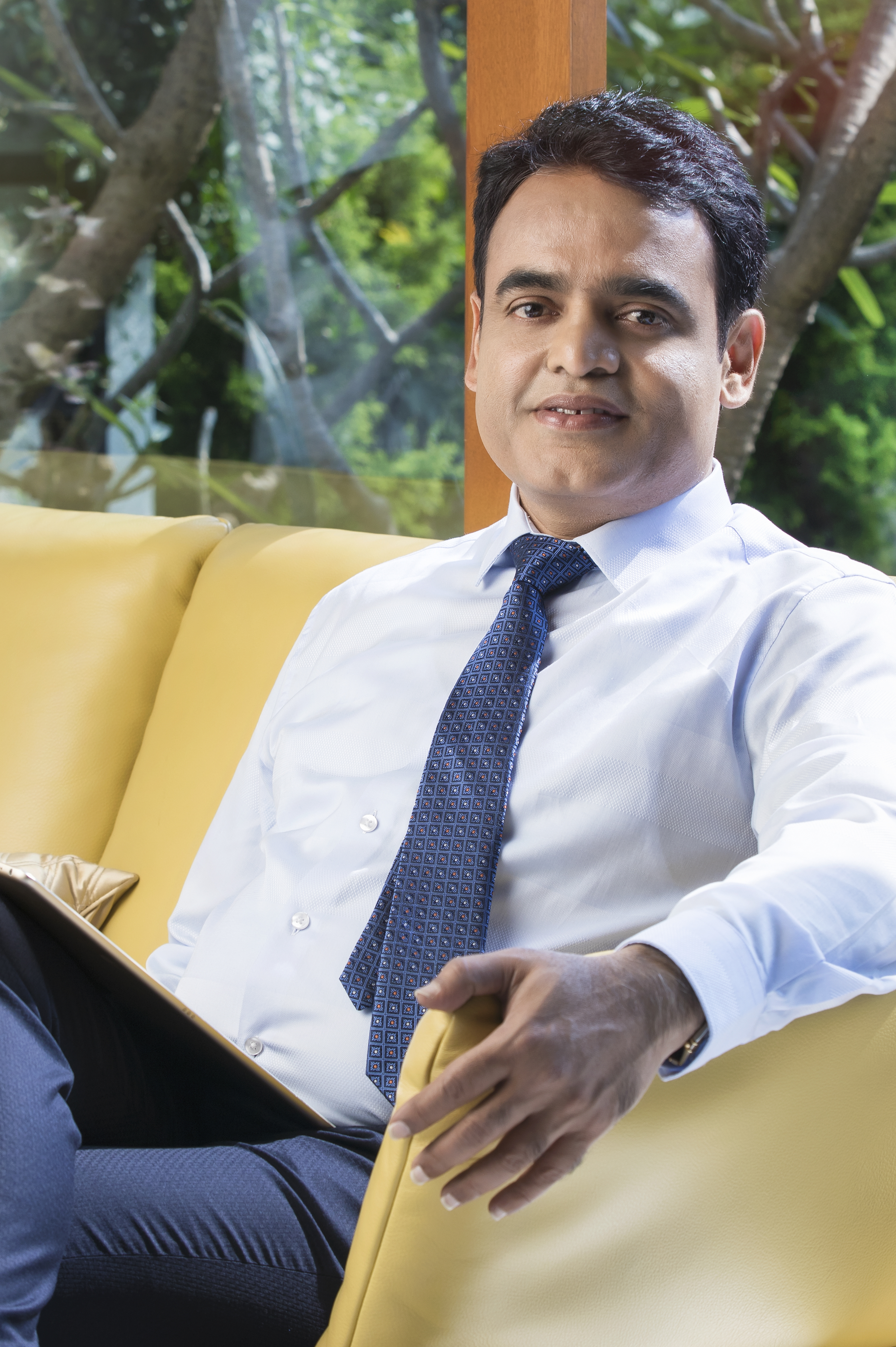

Minister of Higher Education Government of Karnataka
- In office 20 August 2019 – 13 May 2023
- Chief Minister: B. S. Yediyurappa; Basavaraj Bommai
- Preceded by: GT Devegowda

Minister of Science & Technology Government of Karnataka
- In office 20 August 2019 – 13 May 2023
- Chief Minister: B. S. Yediyurappa; Basavaraj Bommai
- Preceded by: G. Parameshwara

Minister of IT & BT Government of Karnataka
- In office 20 August 2019 – 13 May 2023
- Chief Minister: B. S. Yediyurappa; Basavaraj Bommai
- Preceded by: G. Parameshwara

Minister of Skill Development Government of Karnataka
- In office 10 February 2020 – 13 May 2023
- Chief Minister: B. S. Yediyurappa; Basavaraj Bommai
- Preceded by: H. Nagesh

8th Deputy Chief Minister of Karnataka
- In office 20 August 2019 – 28 July 2021 Serving with Laxman Savadi and Govind Karjol
- Governor: Vajubhai Vala; Thawar Chand Gehlot
- Chief Minister: B. S. Yediyurappa
- Preceded by: G. Parameshwara
- Succeeded by: D. K. Shivakumar

Minister of Medical Education Government of Karnataka
- In office 27 September 2019 – 10 February 2020
- Chief Minister: B. S. Yediyurappa
- Preceded by: E. Tukaram
- Succeeded by: K. Sudhakar

Member of Karnataka Legislative Assembly
- Incumbent
- Assumed office 2008
- Preceded by: M. R. Seetharam
- Constituency: Malleshwaram

Personal details
- Born: Chikkakalya Narayanappa Ashwathnarayan; 2 February 1969 (age 57) Bangalore, Mysore State, India
- Party: Bharatiya Janata Party
- Spouse: Shruthi H S (m. 2000)
- Children: 2
- Education: Kasturba Medical College, Mangalore
- Website: drashwath.in

Chikkakalya Narayanappa Ashwathnarayan (born 2 February 1969) is an Indian politician who was the Minister of Electronics, Information Technology - Biotechnology, Science and Technology, Higher Education, Skill Development, Entrepreneurship and Livelihood in Government of Karnataka from 20 August 2019 to 13 May 2023. He served as the 8th Deputy Chief Minister of Karnataka from 20 August 2019 to 26 July 2021. He is a Member of Karnataka Legislative Assembly representing the Bharatiya Janata Party (BJP) from the Malleshwaram constituency.

The positions he held include Convener of Doctors Cell - Bharatiya Janata Party and Founder President of Rajiv Gandhi University of Health Sciences, Bangalore. He was also the Vice President of Bharatiya Janata Party, Bangalore District, Senate Member of Bangalore University, Syndicate and Senate Member of Rajiv Gandhi University of Health Sciences Employees Association, Bangalore, and the Chairman of Committee for drafting statutes for A&B, C&D cadre of employees of Rajiv Gandhi University of Health Sciences, Bangalore.

On 20 August 2019 he was inducted as the Cabinet Minister in Bharatiya Janata Party Government led by Chief minister B. S. Yeddyurappa.

== Personal life ==
Ashwathnarayan was born to T.K. Narayanappa and A.L. Padmamma on 2 February 1969 in Bangalore. He is married to Shruthi Ashwath, with whom he has a son and a daughter.

== Medical career ==
C. N. Ashwathnarayan achieved his MBBS degree from the Kasturba Medical College, Mangalore in 1995. He started Padmashree Charitable Trust and Shushrutha Group of Institutions, which offer various courses in Paramedic, Management, Science and technology, and Ayurvedic Medical Science.

== Political career ==
C. N. Ashwathnarayan entered mainstream politics in 2004 by joining the BJP and contested from Malleshwaram (Vidhan Sabha constituency). In the year 2008, he again contested from the same constituency. He won the election to the state legislature with a huge margin against two-time MLA, M.R. Seetharam.

He was elevated to the level of Vice President of BJP, Bangalore District. The BJP candidate from Bangalore North constituency won by a large margin in the April 2009 general elections, and BJP candidates won in 6 of 7 wards in the 2010 Municipal corporation elections.

The 'Dhobi Ghat' in Malleswaram was set up in 2009 as the first modern dhobi ghat in both Bangalore and Karnataka. The initiative was spearheaded by Ashwath Narayan as the local MLA and supports the livelihood of 400 families and has now become a 'National Model'.

Anganwadi centres were set up at government Schools in Malleshwaram under the 'Montessori' model to provide the best learning experience for kids. As an MLA, a citizen-centric Complaint Redressal platform called 'Malleshwaram Sahay' was also launched.

== Controversy ==
In May 2022 the opposition, Karnataka Congress, claimed that Ashwath Narayan's brother rigged and influenced the police sub-inspector recruitment scam. He was accused of misusing power as he lodged a FIR against 17 teachers and the High Court of Karnataka had to quash the FIR.

Devaraja police registered an FIR against MLA C N Ashwath Narayan for his alleged statement at Sathanur in Mandya to 'finish off Siddaramaiah like Urigowda Nanjegowda finished off Tipu'.
