= Avinash Jadhav =

Indian politician

MNS Thane & Palghar District President
- Constituency: Thane

Personal details
- Born: Avinash Jadhav; 15-Apr-1982 Thane
- Party: Maharashtra Navnirman Sena

Avinash Jadhav is a politician from the Maharashtra state of India. He belongs to the political party of Maharashtra Navnirman Sena (MNS), MNS Thane and Palghar district president.

== Political career ==
Avinash started his political journey with Maharashtra Navnirman Vidhyarthi Sena Thane district.
