= Uttama Prajaakeeya Party =

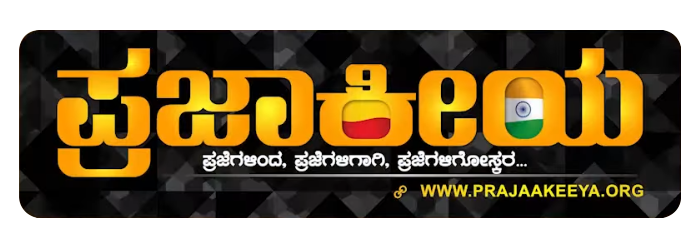
- Abbreviation: UPP
- President: Upendra
- Founder: Upendra
- Founded: 18 September 2018 (8 years ago); Registered on 18 September 2018
- Headquarters: Bengaluru, Karnataka
- Ideology: Socialist
- ECI status: Unrecognised Registered Party
- Seats in Karnataka Legislative Assembly: 0 / 224

Party flag
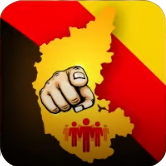

Website
- www.prajaakeeya.org

Uttama Prajaakeeya Party (UPP) is an Indian Socialist political party based in Karnataka. The party contested the 2019 Lok Sabha Elections across all the constituencies in Karnataka.

== History ==
On 12 August 2017, Kannada Actor and Director Upendra Rao, known for his movie direction, announced that he will stepping into administration and governance by starting his own political party under a socialist concept Prajaakeeya (translates to 'people-centric').

=== Karnataka Pragnyavantha Janatha Party ===
He extended his support to an already existing politician, Mahesh Gowda and jointly formed a party called Karnataka Pragnyavantha Janatha Paksha (KPJP) and invited suggestions from the general public on improving various aspects of administration.

However, due to differences in ideologies with Mahesh, Upendra left the party in March 2018, stating that Mahesh's involvement in internal party corruption was not in line with his ideology of complete transparency and non-corruption. Mahesh Gowda alleged that Upendra was acting like a dictator within the party. Sources inside KPJP refuted this, stating that Upendra had not taken it well when a video of certain people offering money to Gowda in exchange for party seats, had surfaced. Upendra believed that this was against his core concept of Prajakeeya.

In May 2018, KPJP elected legislator R Shankar won the Ranibennur assembly seat and was seen supporting Congress after having extended support to BJP earlier that morning, prior to the results.

=== Uttama Prajaakeeya Party ===
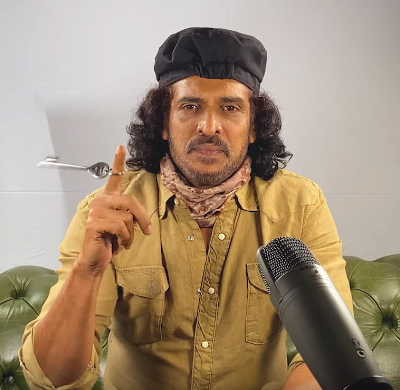
Upendra during a promotion campaign of the party

Following his exit from KPJP, Upendra launched his party called Uttama Prajaakeeya Party (acronym UPP) with a new manifesto based on ART of governance (acronym for Accountability, Responsibility and Transparency). Upendra registered the party and had the symbol 'auto-rickshaw' registered with the Election Commission. UPP contested the 2019 Lok Sabha Elections with candidates in all 28 constituencies in Karnataka, with a strict rule against celebrities and only ordinary citizens with no criminal records or any corruption charges against them as the UPP candidates. [20] Upendra himself did not contest the said elections.

== Ideology ==
Upendra built the idea for a regional party in Karnataka based on Prajaakeeya (people-oriented). This would focus mainly on the labour class with education, health and transparency in governance, detailed in his party manifesto. UPP has created a five-point program to convince people of their commitment to democratic principles: Selection, Election, Correction, Rejection, Promotion. The ideology is built around the fact that citizen take an active role in the selection and election process and the people reserve the right to expel or promote an elected representative, based on their performance.

Prajaakeeya revolves around the primary socialist sub-aspect of democracy as being "for the people". Additionally, administration is to be treated as a service and, as opposed to Rajakeeya, the elected administrators are supposed to be the servants of the people. Also, by conducting polls before sanctioning public projects, the control to make administrative decisions is extended to the general citizen. Upendra also stressed on the need for a regional party to exist, so as to understand the issues with a particular region and act accordingly.

Party candidature is extended to the open public and candidates are chosen via a written test (based on the candidates reason for joining politics, their developmental plans, etc.), an interview and extensive background check. Additionally, candidates are expected to wear a uniform resembling a working structure as in any private establishment.

UPP has also eliminated the need for a party fund and the party runs without any monetary backup.

== Electoral performance ==
As per EC of India, UPP is a registered, yet a non-recognized party as of 2019.

UPP had candidates from various backgrounds contest the 2019 Lok Sabha Elections across all the constituencies of Karnataka.

As a party, UPP was not involved in any extensive on-the-ground promotional campaigns for the 2019 Lok Sabha Elections, as the party founder believes that the existence of technology in the current age negates the need for ground promotional campaigns and most of their campaigning was on social media.

Many candidates supported by UPP contested Karnataka Panchayat Elections in 2020. Chethan one of the candidate supported by the party emerged victorious in the election from Arehalli village in Channagiri taluk, Davangere District. Actor Upendra Visited the village to congratulate the winner and assured the villagers that he will visit again in 6 months to check on the developmental works done by the winner
