= Arunkumar Guththur =

Indian politician

Arun Kumar poojar

Member of the Karnataka Legislative Assembly
- Incumbent
- Assumed office 2019
- Preceded by: R. Shankar
- Succeeded by: Prakash Koliwad
- Constituency: Ranebennur

Personal details
- Party: Bharatiya Janata Party

Arun Kumar poojar is an Indian politician who was a former Member of the Karnataka Legislative Assembly from Ranebennur Vidhan Sabha constituency in the by-election in 2019 as a Bharatiya Janata Party candidate.
