= Yeshvanthapura Assembly constituency =

Legislative Assembly constituency in Karnataka, India

Coordinates: 13.029°N 77.540°E

Yeswanthpur
- Constituency No. 153 for the Karnataka Legislative Assembly

Constituency details
- Country: India
- Region: South India
- State: Karnataka
- District: Bangalore Urban
- Lok Sabha constituency: Bangalore North
- Established: 1961 (first establishment), 2008 (second establishment)
- Total electors: 564,208 (2023)
- Reservation: None

Member of Legislative Assembly
- 16th Karnataka Legislative Assembly
- Incumbent S. T. Somashekhar
- Party: Bharatiya Janata Party (At the time of Election); Independent (Currently)
- Elected year: 2023
- Preceded by: Shobha Karandlaje

Yeswanthpur Assembly constituency is one of the 224 constituencies in the Karnataka Legislative Assembly of Karnataka, southern India. It is also part of Bangalore North Lok Sabha constituency.

== Members of the Legislative Assembly ==
Election	Member	Party
1962	Krishna Byre Gowda	Indian National Congress
2008	Shobha Karandlaje	Bharatiya Janata Party
2013	S. T. Somashekhar	Indian National Congress
2018	S. T. Somashekhar	Indian National Congress
2019 By-election (Note: Disqualified by the Hon'ble Speaker under the 10th Schedule of the Constitution with effect from 25/07/2019)	S. T. Somashekhar	Bharatiya Janata Party
2023	S. T. Somashekhar	Bharatiya Janata Party

== Election results ==
=== Assembly Election 2023 ===
2023 Karnataka Legislative Assembly election : Yeshvanthapura
Party	Candidate	Votes	%	±%
BJP	S. T. Somashekhar	169,149	47.26	▼4.11
JD(S)	T. N. Javarayi Gowda	154,031	43.04	▲1.50
INC	S. Balraj Gowda	21,684	6.06	▲0.48
UPP	Uday Kumar	4,298	1.20	▲0.52
NOTA	None of the above	2,857	0.80	▼0.20
AAP	Shashidhar. C. Aradhya	2,199	0.61	New
Margin of victory		15,118	4.22	▼5.61
Turnout		357,998	63.45	▲4.31
Total valid votes		357,911		
Registered electors		564,208		▲17.30
BJP hold		Swing	▼4.11	

=== Assembly By-election 2019 ===
2019 Karnataka Legislative Assembly by-election : Yeshvanthapura
Party	Candidate	Votes	%	±%
BJP	S. T. Somashekhar	144,722	51.37	▲30.72
JD(S)	T. N. Javarayi Gowda	117,023	41.54	▲5.13
INC	P. Nagaraj	15,714	5.58	▼34.56
NOTA	None of the above	2,812	1.00	▲0.49
UPP	Manjunatha. M	1,915	0.68	New
Margin of victory		27,699	9.83	▲6.10
Turnout		284,446	59.14	▼1.37
Total valid votes		281,723		
Registered electors		480,986		▲1.30
BJP gain from INC		Swing	▲11.23	

=== Assembly Election 2018 ===
2018 Karnataka Legislative Assembly election : Yeshvanthapura
Party	Candidate	Votes	%	±%
INC	S. T. Somashekhar	115,273	40.14	▼23.22
JD(S)	T. N. Javarayi Gowda	104,562	36.41	▼11.63
BJP	Jaggesh	59,308	20.65	▲13.94
NOTA	None of the above	1,453	0.51	New
Margin of victory		10,711	3.73	▼11.59
Turnout		287,331	60.51	▼5.73
Total valid votes		287,205		
Registered electors		474,817		▲35.79
INC hold		Swing	▼23.22	

=== Assembly Election 2013 ===
2013 Karnataka Legislative Assembly election : Yeshvanthapura
Party	Candidate	Votes	%	±%
INC	S. T. Somashekhar	120,380	63.36	▲25.79
JD(S)	T. N. Javarayi Gowda	91,280	48.04	▲26.15
BJP	H. L. Krishnappa	12,747	6.71	▼31.58
Margin of victory		29,100	15.32	▲14.60
Turnout		231,604	66.24	▲9.47
Total valid votes		189,998		
Registered electors		349,667		▲31.87
INC gain from BJP		Swing	▲25.07	

=== Assembly Election 2008 ===
2008 Karnataka Legislative Assembly election : Yeshvanthapura
Party	Candidate	Votes	%	±%
BJP	Shobha Karandlaje	57,643	38.29	New
INC	S. T. Somashekhar	56,561	37.57	▼7.02
JD(S)	Panchalingaiah	32,947	21.89	New
Independent	M. U. Venkateshaiah	2,062	1.37	New
BSP	Bettegowda. G	1,331	0.88	New
Margin of victory		1,082	0.72	▼1.30
Turnout		150,548	56.77	▼1.84
Total valid votes		150,544		
Registered electors		265,168		▲358.19
BJP gain from INC		Swing	▼6.30	

== See also ==
- Bangalore Urban district
- List of constituencies of Karnataka Legislative Assembly
