= Mahalakshmi Layout Assembly constituency =

Legislative Assembly constituency in Karnataka, India

Coordinates: 13.014°N 77.549°E

Mahalakshmi Layout Mahalakshmipuram
- Constituency No. 156 for the Karnataka Legislative Assembly

Constituency details
- Country: India
- Region: South India
- State: Karnataka
- District: Bangalore Urban
- Established: 2008
- Total electors: 292,040 (2023)
- Reservation: None

Member of Legislative Assembly
- 16th Karnataka Legislative Assembly
- Incumbent K. Gopalaiah
- Party: BJP
- Elected year: 2023
- Preceded by: N. L. Narendra Babu

Mahalakshmi Layout Assembly Constituency is one of the 224 legislative assembly segments of the state of Karnataka. It is a part of Bangalore Urban district and comes under Bangalore North Lok Sabha constituency.

The constituency was formed in the year 2008, carved out of portions of Rajajinagar, Yelahanka and the erstwhile Uttarahalli Assembly constituencies. The constituency is predominantly urban in nature with a mix of old residential areas, industrial areas and slums. It comprises the northern parts of West Bengaluru such as Mahalakshmi Layout, Nandini Layout, Yeshwanthapur APMC Yard, Goraguntepalya, Kanteerava Nagar, Shankar Nagar, Saraswathipura, Nagapura, Kurubarahalli, Kamalanagar, Vrishabhavathi Nagar and also parts of Basaveshwaranagar and Kamakshipalya.

The MLA for Mahalakshmi Layout as of 2023 is K. Gopalaiah of the Bharatiya Janata Party (BJP).

== Wards ==
Mahalakshmi Layout Assembly constituency includes the following 7 wards of the Bruhat Bengaluru Mahanagara Palike (BBMP):

Ward No.	Ward Name	Corporator
43	Nandini Layout	K. V. Rajendra Kumar
44	Marappanapalya	Mahadev M.
67	Nagapura	Badregowda B.
68	Mahalakshmipura	S. Keshavamurthy
74	Shakthi Ganapathi Nagar	Gangamma Rajanna
75	Shankar Mutt	M. Shivaraju
102	Vrishabhavathi Nagar	Hemalatha Gopalaiah

== Members of the Legislative Assembly ==
Year	Member	Political party
2008	N. L. Narendra Babu	Indian National Congress
2013	K. Gopalaiah (Note: Disqualified by the Hon'ble Speaker under the 10th Schedule of the Constitution with effect from 25/07/2019)	Janata Dal (Secular)
2018	K. Gopalaiah	Janata Dal (Secular)
2019 (Note: By-Election)	K. Gopalaiah	Bharatiya Janata Party
2023	K. Gopalaiah	Bharatiya Janata Party

== Election results ==
=== Assembly Election 2023 ===
2023 Karnataka Legislative Assembly election : Mahalakshmi Layout
Party	Candidate	Votes	%	±%
BJP	K. Gopalaiah	96,424	60.60	▲1.13
INC	Keshavamurthy. S	45,259	28.45	▲6.64
JD(S)	K. C. Rajanna	9,241	5.81	▼10.47
UPP	Lakshminarayana. M. R	2,853	1.79	▲0.56
NOTA	None of the above	2,286	1.44	▲0.03
AAP	Shanthala Damle	1,600	1.01	New
Margin of victory		51,165	32.16	▼5.50
Turnout		159,167	54.50	▲3.29
Total valid votes		159,103		
Registered electors		292,040		▲2.15
BJP hold		Swing	▲1.13	

=== Assembly By-election 2019 ===
2019 Karnataka Legislative Assembly by-election : Mahalakshmi Layout
Party	Candidate	Votes	%	±%
BJP	K. Gopalaiah	85,889	59.47	▲30.00
INC	M. Shivaraju	31,503	21.81	▲8.99
JD(S)	Dr. Girish K. Nashi	23,516	16.28	▼38.90
NOTA	None of the above	2,035	1.41	▲0.32
UPP	Asha Rani .V	1,771	1.23	New
Margin of victory		54,386	37.66	▲11.95
Turnout		146,400	51.21	▼3.48
Total valid votes		144,420		
Registered electors		285,897		▼2.21
BJP gain from JD(S)		Swing	▲4.29	

=== Assembly Election 2018 ===
2018 Karnataka Legislative Assembly election : Mahalakshmi Layout
Party	Candidate	Votes	%	±%
JD(S)	K. Gopalaiah	88,218	55.18	▼5.88
BJP	N. L. Narendra Babu	47,118	29.47	▲7.73
INC	Manjunatha. H. S	20,496	12.82	▼34.05
NOTA	None of the above	1,739	1.09	New
Margin of victory		41,100	25.71	▲11.52
Turnout		159,881	54.69	▼5.59
Total valid votes		159,880		
Registered electors		292,364		▲19.04
JD(S) hold		Swing	▼5.88	

=== Assembly Election 2013 ===
2013 Karnataka Legislative Assembly election : Mahalakshmi Layout
Party	Candidate	Votes	%	±%
JD(S)	K. Gopalaiah	66,127	61.06	▲36.28
INC	N. L. Narendra Babu	50,757	46.87	▲9.25
BJP	S. Harish	23,545	21.74	▼13.03
KJP	Veeresh Kumar. T	2,936	2.71	New
LSP	Rajshree Muralidhar	1,168	1.08	New
Independent	K. N. Sridhar	967	0.89	New
Margin of victory		15,370	14.19	▲11.35
Turnout		148,061	60.28	▲8.78
Total valid votes		108,299		
Registered electors		245,603		▲11.53
JD(S) gain from INC		Swing	▲23.44	

=== Assembly Election 2008 ===
2008 Karnataka Legislative Assembly election : Mahalakshmi Layout
Party	Candidate	Votes	%	±%
INC	N. L. Narendra Babu	42,652	37.62	New
BJP	R. V. Hareesh	39,427	34.77	New
JD(S)	K. Gopalaiah	28,097	24.78	New
Independent	V. Harish	1,054	0.93	New
BSP	Somu	708	0.62	New
Margin of victory		3,225	2.84	
Turnout		113,404	51.50	
Total valid votes		113,386		
Registered electors		220,222		
INC win (new seat)				

== See also ==
- Government of Karnataka
- Vidhan Sabha
- Mahalakshmi Layout
