= Arbail Shivaram Hebbar =

Indian politician (born 1956)

Minister of Labour Department of Karnataka
- In office 6 February 2021 – 13 May 2023
- Preceded by: S. Suresh Kumar, BJP

Minister for Sugar Government of Karnataka
- In office 6 February 2020 – 21 January 2021
- Preceded by: C. T. Ravi
- Succeeded by: M. T. B. Nagaraj

Member of the Karnataka Legislative Assembly
- Incumbent
- Assumed office 18 May 2018
- Constituency: Yellapura

Personal details
- Born: 4 June 1956 (age 70) Artibail (Yellapur taluk)
- Children: Vivek Hebbar and Shruti Hebbar
- Occupation: Politician
- Website: https://shivaramhebbar.com/

Arbail Shivaram Hebbar is an Indian politician who is the Minister of the Labour Department of Karnataka since 6 February 2020. He was elected to the Karnataka Legislative Assembly from Yellapura in the 2018 Karnataka Legislative Assembly election as a member of the Indian National Congress but switched to Bharatiya Janata Party in 2019 and won the by-elections in December 2019.

== Early life ==
Hebbar was born and brought up in the Uttara Kannada district of the southern small village called Shivakar on the banks of river Gangavati in the Indian state of Karnataka.

== Political career ==
In 1983, he was elected to Yellapur APMC and this was his maiden entry to public life. In 2008, he contested the Yellapur-Mundgod Assembly elections as a Congress candidate against V S Patil but lost.
