= R. Shankar (politician) =

Indian politician

Minister of Horticulture and Sericulture Government of Karnataka
- In office 21 January 2021 – 26 July 2021
- Preceded by: K. C. Narayana gowda

Member of Legislative Assembly Karnataka
- In office 17 May 2018 – July 2019
- Constituency: Ranebennur

Personal details
- Party: Indian National Congress (2024–present)
- Other political affiliations: Nationalist Congress Party (2023–2024) Bharatiya Janata Party (2019-2023)Karnataka Pragnyavantha Janatha Party (till 2019)

Ramchandrappa Shankar is an Indian politician who was the Minister of State for Horticulture and sericulture of Karnataka. He was elected to the Karnataka Legislative Assembly from Ranebennur in the 2018 Karnataka Legislative Assembly election as a member of the Karnataka Pragnyavantha Janatha Party.
