= Ramesh Jarkiholi =

Indian politician

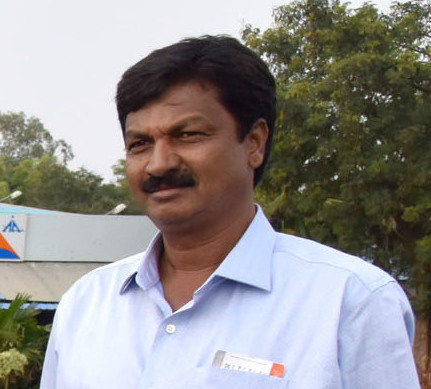

Member of the Karnataka Legislative Assembly
- Incumbent
- Assumed office December 1999
- Constituency: Gokak

Minister of Municipal Administration Government of Karnataka
- In office June 2018 – December 2018
- Chief Minister: H. D. Kumaraswamy

Minister of Small Scale Industries Government of Karnataka
- In office June 2016 – May 2018
- Chief Minister: Siddaramaiah

Minister of Major and Medium Irrigation from Water resources department of Karnataka
- In office 7 February 2020 – 3 March 2021
- Chief Minister: B. S. Yediyurappa
- Preceded by: D. K. Shivakumar

Personal details
- Born: 1 May 1960 (age 66) Belgaum, Mysore State, India
- Party: Bharatiya Janata party (2019–present)
- Other political affiliations: Indian National Congress (Until 2019)
- Relatives: Satish Jarkiholi (brother)
- Education: Bachelor of Arts
- Occupation: Politician

Ramesh Laxmanrao Jarkiholi (born 1 May 1960) an Indian politician, former minister of Water Resources in the Government of Karnataka, between 2020 and 2021. As member of the Bharatiya Janata Party (BJP), he represents Gokak in the Karnataka Legislative Assembly. He previously served as the Minister for Municipal Administration.

Jarkiholi is a six-time member of the Karnataka Legislative Assembly. In June 2016, he was inducted into the Siddaramaiah-led government of Karnataka as a cabinet minister. He held the Small Scale Industries Ministry portfolio. He was disqualified from the assembly as per the anti-defection law in 2019, but was re-elected to the assembly on a BJP ticket in December 2019.

== Early life ==
Jarkiholi was born in Belgaum in 1960 to a prominent sugarcane growing family and businessman Laxmanrao Jarkiholi. He is from Valmiki Nayaka community designated as a Scheduled Tribe in India's reservation system. His 4 siblings are all also in politics, 3 with Congress and 2 with BJP.

== Political career ==
Jarkiholi defected to the Bharatiya Janata Party and represented Gokak Assembly Constituency of Belgaum, Karnataka. The constituency has been ruled by the Jarkiholi family for over 15 years. He was previously associated with Indian National Congress. Three members of the Jarkiholi family, Ramesh Jarkiholi, Balachandra Jarkiholi and Satish Jarkiholi contest from Gokak, Arabhavi and Yamakanamaradi Assembly constituencies respectively from different political parties. Ramesh Jarkiholi's brother Satish Jarkiholi is a current member of the Karnataka Legislative Council representing the Yemkanamardi constituency in Belgaum District. Ramesh Jarkiholi was first elected to the Karnataka Legislative Assembly in 1999 by beating Naik Chandrashekhar Sadashiva of the Janata Dal (United) by over 55,000 votes. In the 2004 elections he won the seat against Muttennavar Mallappa Laxman of the Bharatiya Janata Party by over 15,000 votes. In the 2008 Karnataka Legislative Assembly elections he beat the Janata Dal candidate Ashok Ningayya Pujari by over 7,000 votes. Jarkiholi was a sitting member of the Karnataka Legislative Assembly as he retained his Gokak Assembly by beating Ashok Ningayya Pujari of the Janata Dal (Secular) by over 28,000 votes.

== Ministry ==
Besides holding the Small Scale Industries Ministry portfolio Jarkiholi was also the Belgaum District Guardian Minister in-charge of the District. As the Guardian Minister in-charge of the District Jarkiholi took up causes of poor patients and instructed health department officials to initiate action against private hospitals who fail to display their charges as per the Karnataka Private Medical Establishments Act for their hospital services.

== Controversies ==
=== Operation Kamala ===
In October 2018, Jarkiholi convinced other MLAs from Belagavi to rebel against Congress. He was angry at being dropped from Ministry and having troubleshooter DK Shivakumar influencing Belagavi politics, because DKS got Jarkiholi's rival Lakshmi Hebbalkar elected as MLA from Belagavi (Rural) and made her President of KPCC Women's Wing. He organized 14 other Congress MLAs to resign their posts.

He was one of the 15 MLAs from Congress and 2 from JD(S) who resigned in July 2019, bringing down the HDK Congress-JD(S) coalition and allowing BSY to return to power. After Supreme Court ruling held up their disqualification but allowed them to run, Jarkiholi joined BJP along with all other rebels inducted by Sri B.S. Yeddyurappa and other important persons. He was given BJP ticket for by poll for his Gokak seat. He then handily defeated his challengers in bypolls in December, beating his nearest rival, his brother Lakhan contesting as a Congress candidate, by almost 30,000 votes.

== Sex scandal ==
On 2 March 2021, charges were filed against Jarkiholi for sexually harassing a woman on the pretext of getting her a government job. Although he denied the charges, Jarkiholi resigned just before the budget session. Karnataka Home Minister Basavaraj Bommai formed a Special Investigation Team (SIT) to probe the sex scandal allegedly involving Ramesh Jarkiholi.
