= Anand Singh (Karnataka politician) =

Indian politician

Minister of Tourism, Ecology and Environment of Karnataka
- In office 4 August 2021 – 13 May 2023
- Preceded by: C. P. Yogeeshwara

Minister of Tourism, Ecology and Environment Department of Karnataka
- In office 6 February 2020 – 21 January 2021
- Chief Minister: B. S. Yediyurappa
- Preceded by: C. C. Patil, BJP
- Succeeded by: C. P. Yogeeshwara, BJP

Minister of State for Tourism of Karnataka
- In office 2010–2013
- Preceded by: G. Janardhana Reddy
- Succeeded by: R. V. Deshpande
- In office 10 February 2020 – 21 January 2021
- Preceded by: C. T. Ravi
- Succeeded by: C. P. Yogeeshwara, BJP

Member of the Karnataka Legislative Assembly
- In office 2008–2023
- Preceded by: H. R. Gaviyappa(As MLA for Hospet
- Succeeded by: H. R. Gaviyappa
- Constituency: Vijayanagara

Minister of Infrastructure development, Hajj & Waqf Department of Karnataka
- In office 10 February 2021 – 26 July 2021

Personal details
- Born: 3 October 1966 (age 60) Hosapete,Ballari district, Mysore State (present-day Vijayanagara district, Karnataka)
- Party: Bharatiya Janata party (2019–present)
- Other political affiliations: Indian National Congress (2018-2019)
- Children: 3
- Occupation: Politician

Anand Prithviraj Singh is an Indian politician who earlier served as Minister of Tourism, Ecology and Environment of Karnataka from 4 August 2021 to 13 May 2023. He was the Minister of Infrastructure development, Hajj & Waqf Department of Karnataka from 10 February 2021 to 26 July 2021. He is a Member of the Karnataka Legislative Assembly from Vijayanagara constituency from 16 May 2018.

He was the Tourism minister in the Government of Karnataka and for the fourth time he was elected as a member of the Karnataka Legislative Assembly. He was one of the 17 members to resign and the reason for the downfall of the coalition government of Karnataka in 2019. He then joined the BJP and contested the by-elections. He has been elected for the Fourth consecutive time as MLA from Vijayanagara (Hospet) constituency in 2019 state by-elections. He was then inducted into the Third B. S. Yeddyurappa ministry.

== Background ==
Singh comes from the Rajput family

== Career ==
He represents the Vijayanagara constituency as a member of the Bharatiya Janata Party.

In 2015, Singh was arrested in the Belekeri iron ore scam. He was later released on bail.

== Controversies ==
=== Accused of forest encroachment and illegal mining ===
Anand Singh has 15 criminal cases against him, and is facing 3 CBI trials about encroachment and illegal mining. After joining the BJP and forming the government he was given the forest department portfolio to serve as a cabinet minister. This was criticized by the opposition and the media, calling it an act to hush up the criminal cases by means of his cabinet powers. They also insisted on changing his portfolio so that the enquiry is not affected..
