= Kagwad Assembly constituency =

Legislative Assembly constituency in Karnataka, India

Coordinates: 16.69°N 74.72°E

Kagwad
- Constituency No. 4 for the Karnataka Legislative Assembly

Constituency details
- Country: India
- Region: South India
- State: Karnataka
- District: Belagavi
- Lok Sabha constituency: Chikkodi
- Established: 1961
- Total electors: 195,985 (2023)
- Reservation: None

Member of Legislative Assembly
- 16th Karnataka Legislative Assembly
- Incumbent Raju Kage
- Party: Indian National Congress
- Elected year: 2023
- Preceded by: Shrimant Patil

Kagwad Assembly constituency is one of the 224 constituencies in the Karnataka Legislative Assembly of Karnataka, a southern state of India. Kagwad is also part of Chikkodi Lok Sabha constituency.

== Members of the Legislative Assembly ==
Election	Member	Party
1962	Shankaragaud Veeranagoud Patil	Indian National Congress
1967	B. C. Peeraji	Indian National Congress
1972	Kittur Ragunath Dhulappa	Indian National Congress
1978	Annarao Balappa Jakanur	Indian National Congress
1983	Vasanthrao Lakangouda Patil	Janata Party
1985	Vasanthrao Lakangouda Patil	Janata Party
1989	Annarao Balappa Jakanur	Indian National Congress
1994	Shaha Mohan Hirachand	Janata Dal
1999	Pasagouda Urf Popat Appagoda Patil	Indian National Congress
2000 By-election	Bharamgouda Alagouda Kage	Janata Dal
2004	Bharamgouda Alagouda Kage	Bharatiya Janata Party
2008	Bharamgouda Alagouda Kage	Bharatiya Janata Party
2013	Bharamgouda Alagouda Kage	Bharatiya Janata Party
2018	Shrimant Patil	Indian National Congress
2019 By-election	Shrimant Patil	Bharatiya Janata Party
2023	Bharamgouda Alagouda Kage	Indian National Congress

== Election results ==
=== Assembly Election 2023 ===
2023 Karnataka Legislative Assembly election : Kagwad
Party	Candidate	Votes	%	±%
INC	Bharamgouda Alagouda Kage	83,387	51.45%	▲9.97
BJP	Shrimant Patil	74,560	46.00%	▼8.66
NOTA	None of the above	985	0.61%	▼0.27
Margin of victory		8,827	5.45%	▼7.73
Turnout		162,316	82.82%	▲6.94
Total valid votes		162,078		
Registered electors		195,985		▲4.76
INC gain from BJP		Swing	▼3.21	

=== Assembly By-election 2019 ===
2019 Karnataka Legislative Assembly by-election : Kagwad
Party	Candidate	Votes	%	±%
BJP	Shrimant Patil	76,952	54.66%	▲20.27
INC	Bharamgouda Alagouda Kage	58,395	41.48%	▼15.51
JD(S)	Shri Shrishail Parasappa Tugashetti (Shettar)	2,448	1.74%	▼3.29
NOTA	None of the above	1,238	0.88%	▲0.36
VBA	Vivek Jayendra Shetti	1,099	0.78%	New
Margin of victory		18,557	13.18%	▼9.42
Turnout		141,945	75.88%	▼4.20
Total valid votes		140,792		
Registered electors		187,074		▲2.69
BJP gain from INC		Swing	▼2.33	

=== Assembly Election 2018 ===
2018 Karnataka Legislative Assembly election : Kagwad
Party	Candidate	Votes	%	±%
INC	Shrimant Patil	83,060	56.99%	▲31.40
BJP	Bharamgouda Alagouda Kage	50,118	34.39%	▲2.05
JD(S)	Kallappa Paris Magennavar	7,337	5.03%	▼25.08
Sarva Janata Party	Divakar Ramachandra Potadar	1,004	0.69%	New
NOTA	None of the above	754	0.52%	New
Margin of victory		32,942	22.60%	▲20.37
Turnout		145,878	80.08%	▲1.39
Total valid votes		145,735		
Registered electors		182,173		▲10.94
INC gain from BJP		Swing	▲24.65	

=== Assembly Election 2013 ===
2013 Karnataka Legislative Assembly election : Kagwad
Party	Candidate	Votes	%	±%
BJP	Bharamgouda Alagouda Kage	41,784	32.34%	▼9.61
JD(S)	Shrimant Patil	38,897	30.11%	▲15.36
INC	Kirankumar Tatyagouda Patil	33,057	25.59%	▼8.04
KJP	Ajit Bharamu Chougale	8,788	6.80%	New
BSP	Vidyadhar. S. Kamble	2,158	1.67%	▼2.15
Independent	Shoba Balu Tavadare	908	0.70%	New
Margin of victory		2,887	2.23%	▼6.09
Turnout		129,213	78.69%	▲8.11
Total valid votes		129,200		
Registered electors		164,213		▲7.35
BJP hold		Swing	▼9.61	

=== Assembly Election 2008 ===
2008 Karnataka Legislative Assembly election : Kagwad
Party	Candidate	Votes	%	±%
BJP	Bharamgouda Alagouda Kage	45,286	41.95%	▼0.54
INC	Digvijaya Yashawantrao Pawar Desai	36,304	33.63%	▼5.56
JD(S)	Shrimant Patil	15,923	14.75%	▲5.31
BSP	Anand Shantappa Sadalage	4,119	3.82%	▼1.59
Rashtriya Hindustan Sena Karnataka	Sridhar Mahadev Joshi	1,532	1.42%	New
Independent	Narsinha Tukaram Patil	1,395	1.29%	New
RPI(A)	Shravan Maruti Kamble	962	0.89%	New
JD(U)	Annasab Irappa Sattikar	846	0.78%	New
Margin of victory		8,982	8.32%	▲5.03
Turnout		107,963	70.58%	▲0.26
Total valid votes		107,947		
Registered electors		152,975		▲2.54
BJP hold		Swing	▼0.54	

=== Assembly Election 2004 ===
2004 Karnataka Legislative Assembly election : Kagwad
Party	Candidate	Votes	%	±%
BJP	Bharamagouda (Raju) Alagouda Kage	44,529	42.49%	▲39.13
INC	Kirankumar Tatyagouda Patil	41,077	39.19%	▼7.48
JD(S)	Mohan Hirachand Shah	9,895	9.44%	New
BSP	Surendra Siddappa Karigar	5,674	5.41%	New
JP	Gadige Rajaram Shivaling	1,869	1.78%	New
Sirpanch Samaj Party	Rathod Tarer Sing Ram Sing	1,764	1.68%	New
Margin of victory		3,452	3.29%	▲2.17
Turnout		104,909	70.32%	▲4.07
Total valid votes		104,808		
Registered electors		149,181		▲8.37
BJP gain from JD(U)		Swing	▼5.29	

=== Assembly By-election 2000 ===
2000 Karnataka Legislative Assembly by-election : Kagwad
Party	Candidate	Votes	%	±%
JD(U)	Bharamgouda Alagouda Kage	43,557	47.78%	New
INC	Vijaya P. Patil	42,538	46.67%	▲11.29
BJP	P. S. Annagouda	3,061	3.36%	▼10.42
Independent	B. A. Tammanna	1,998	2.19%	New
Margin of victory		1,019	1.12%	▼8.85
Turnout		91,191	66.25%	▼5.25
Total valid votes		91,154		
Registered electors		137,655		▲2.75
JD(U) gain from INC		Swing	▲12.40	

=== Assembly Election 1999 ===
1999 Karnataka Legislative Assembly election : Kagwad
Party	Candidate	Votes	%	±%
INC	Pasagouda Urf Popat Appagoda Patil	31,462	35.38%	▲3.73
Independent	Bharamgouda Alagouda Kage	22,593	25.41%	New
Independent	Shaha Mohan Hirachand	16,952	19.06%	New
BJP	Anand Shantappa Sadalage	12,255	13.78%	▲12.38
BSP	Shivagouda Balesh Chunar	2,385	2.68%	New
Independent	Shaila J. Karchi	2,003	2.25%	New
Independent	Pujarijayashri Savant	1,274	1.43%	New
Margin of victory		8,869	9.97%	▼10.80
Turnout		95,788	71.50%	▲1.79
Total valid votes		88,924		
Rejected ballots		6,780	7.08%	▲4.70
Registered electors		133,972		▲12.41
INC gain from JD		Swing	▼17.04	

=== Assembly Election 1994 ===
1994 Karnataka Legislative Assembly election : Kagwad
Party	Candidate	Votes	%	±%
JD	Shaha Mohan Hirachand	42,514	52.42%	▲25.66
INC	Annarao Balappa Jakanur	25,670	31.65%	▼10.02
Independent	Vasanthrao Lakangouda Patil	8,130	10.03%	New
INC	Huddar Bharamappa Yeshwant	2,778	3.43%	New
BJP	Kundargi Lalita Krishnaraj	1,133	1.40%	New
Margin of victory		16,844	20.77%	▲5.86
Turnout		83,084	69.71%	▲0.47
Total valid votes		81,097		
Rejected ballots		1,977	2.38%	▼4.10
Registered electors		119,186		▲4.90
JD gain from INC		Swing	▲10.75	

=== Assembly Election 1989 ===
1989 Karnataka Legislative Assembly election : Kagwad
Party	Candidate	Votes	%	±%
INC	Annarao. B. Jakanur	30,658	41.67%	▲0.18
JD	Kiran. T. Patil	19,689	26.76%	New
Kranti Sabha	Mohan. H. Shan	17,624	23.95%	New
JP	Bapusaheb. R. Patil	4,038	5.49%	New
Independent	Uttam. P. Patil	895	1.22%	New
Independent	Sudhir. A. Patil	456	0.62%	New
Margin of victory		10,969	14.91%	▲2.81
Turnout		78,669	69.24%	▼2.57
Total valid votes		73,574		
Rejected ballots		5,095	6.48%	▲5.01
Registered electors		113,620		▲27.81
INC gain from JP		Swing	▼11.92	

=== Assembly Election 1985 ===
1985 Karnataka Legislative Assembly election : Kagwad
Party	Candidate	Votes	%	±%
JP	Vasanthrao Lakangouda Patil	33,707	53.59%	▼8.99
INC	Huddar Yashawant Bhramappa	26,099	41.49%	▲4.07
Independent	Kharade Pandu Ramu	911	1.45%	New
Independent	Karoli Vijay Sattenna	477	0.76%	New
Independent	Sukhadev Narayan Patil	407	0.65%	New
Margin of victory		7,608	12.10%	▼13.06
Turnout		63,840	71.81%	▼0.40
Total valid votes		62,902		
Rejected ballots		938	1.47%	▼1.09
Registered electors		88,900		▲11.82
JP hold		Swing	▼8.99	

=== Assembly Election 1983 ===
1983 Karnataka Legislative Assembly election : Kagwad
Party	Candidate	Votes	%	±%
JP	Vasanthrao Lakangouda Patil	35,007	62.58%	▲23.04
INC	Annarao Balappa Jakanur	20,933	37.42%	▲28.04
Margin of victory		14,074	25.16%	▲13.63
Turnout		57,411	72.21%	▼3.86
Total valid votes		55,940		
Rejected ballots		1,471	2.56%	▼0.30
Registered electors		79,506		▲7.59
JP gain from INC(I)		Swing	▲11.50	

=== Assembly Election 1978 ===
1978 Karnataka Legislative Assembly election : Kagwad
Party	Candidate	Votes	%	±%
INC(I)	Annarao Balappa Jakanur	27,892	51.08%	New
JP	Padanad Parappa Laxman	21,593	39.54%	New
INC	Patil Prataprao Alagouda	5,123	9.38%	▼57.42
Margin of victory		6,299	11.53%	▼25.62
Turnout		56,215	76.07%	▲28.73
Total valid votes		54,608		
Rejected ballots		1,607	2.86%	▲2.86
Registered electors		73,898		▲15.96
INC(I) gain from INC		Swing	▼15.72	

=== Assembly Election 1972 ===
1972 Mysore State Legislative Assembly election : Kagwad
Party	Candidate	Votes	%	±%
INC	Kittur Ragunath Dhulappa	19,643	66.80%	▼12.88
INC(O)	Karale Laxman Bhimappa	8,718	29.65%	New
Independent	Tukaram Dadoba Kamble	756	2.57%	New
Independent	A. M. Phakire	289	0.98%	New
Margin of victory		10,925	37.15%	▼27.70
Turnout		30,170	47.34%	▲5.21
Total valid votes		29,406		
Registered electors		63,729		▲10.14
INC hold		Swing	▼12.88	

=== Assembly Election 1967 ===
1967 Mysore State Legislative Assembly election : Kagwad
Party	Candidate	Votes	%	±%
INC	B. C. Peeraji	18,544	79.68%	▲13.35
RPI	T. S. Pradhani	3,451	14.83%	New
Independent	H. B. Rama	1,018	4.37%	New
Independent	K. S. Jakkappa	260	1.12%	New
Margin of victory		15,093	64.85%	▲23.85
Turnout		24,378	42.13%	▼19.22
Total valid votes		23,273		
Registered electors		57,860		▲13.94
INC hold		Swing	▲13.35	

=== Assembly Election 1962 ===
1962 Mysore State Legislative Assembly election : Kagwad
Party	Candidate	Votes	%	±%
INC	Shankaragaud Veeranagoud Patil	19,302	66.33%	New
SWA	Jinadatta Gundappa Desai	7,371	25.33%	New
RPI	Sampatrao Pradhanji Talawalkar	2,249	7.73%	New
Independent	Tukaram Satu Mahar	177	0.61%	New
Margin of victory		11,931	41.00%	
Turnout		31,154	61.35%	
Total valid votes		29,099		
Registered electors		50,782		
INC win (new seat)				

== See also ==
- Athani Taluk
- Belagavi district
- Chikkodi Lok Sabha constituency
- List of constituencies of Karnataka Legislative Assembly
