= H. Nagesh =

Indian politician

Minister of Excise Government of Karnataka
- In office 26 August 2019 – 13 January 2021
- Governor: Vajubhai Rudabhai Vala
- Chief Minister: B. S. Yediyurappa

Minister of Skill development, Entrepreneurship and Livelihood Government of Karnataka
- In office 27 September 2019 – 10 February 2020
- Preceded by: P. T. Parameshwar Naik
- Succeeded by: C. N. Ashwath Narayan

Member of Legislative Assembly, Karnataka
- In office 18 May 2018 – 2023
- Preceded by: G. Manjunatha
- Constituency: Mulbagal

Personal details
- Born: 20 July 1958 (age 67) Belathur
- Party: Indian National Congress

Hanumappa Nagesh is an Indian politician and a member of the Karnataka Legislative Assembly representing the constituency of Mulbagal of Kolar district as an independent candidate. He was the minister for small scale industries from the commerce department in the coalition government led by H. D. Kumaraswamy. Later he withdrew his support to the coalition government with its further downfall. He served as Minister For Excise department in B.S. Yediyurappa Cabinet from 20 August 2019. He also served as a Minister for Skill development, Entrepreneurship and Livelihood.

H. Nagesh joined the Congress party on 14 January 2023 along with his supporters at the Karnataka Pradesh Congress Committee office in the presence of state president D. K. Shivakumar and legislature party leader Siddaramaiah.
