= Shrimant Patil =

Indian politician (born 1955)

Minister of Handloom & Textiles from Commerce and Industries department Minister of Minority welfare Government of Karnataka
- In office 6 February 2020 – 26 July 2021
- Chief Minister: B. S. Yediyurappa

Member of the Karnataka Legislative Assembly
- In office 2018–2023
- Preceded by: Bharamgoud Alagoud Kage (Raju Kage)
- Succeeded by: Raju Kage
- Constituency: Kagwad

Personal details
- Born: 31 January 1955 (age 71) Kempwad, Belgaum
- Party: Bharatiya Janata party (2019–present)
- Other political affiliations: Indian National Congress (till 2019)
- Occupation: Agriculturist, Businessman, Educationist, Politician

Shrimant Balasaheb Patil is an Indian politician. He was elected to the Karnataka Legislative Assembly from Kagwad in the 2018 Karnataka Legislative Assembly election as a member of the Indian National Congress. He was one among the 17 Congress and JD(S) legislators who withdrew their support to the H.D.Kumaraswamy government in 2019. He was disqualified from his position as legislator and later joined the Bharatiya Janata Party. He won reelection from Kagwad and was inducted into the ministry of B. S. Yediyurappa in 2020. However, he was not included into the Council of ministers when Basavaraj Bommai became Chief minister.

== Education ==
He completed SSLC (10th Standard) from Shri Siddeshwara High School, Mole which is affiliated with Karnataka Secondary Education Examination Board, Bangalore in 1970. Later he did B.Sc graduation from College of Agriculture, Kolhapur (affiliated with Mahatma Phule Krishi Vidyapeeth, Rahuri) in 1974.
