= Narayana Gowda =

Indian activist and politician (born 1966)

Dr. Narayana Gowda
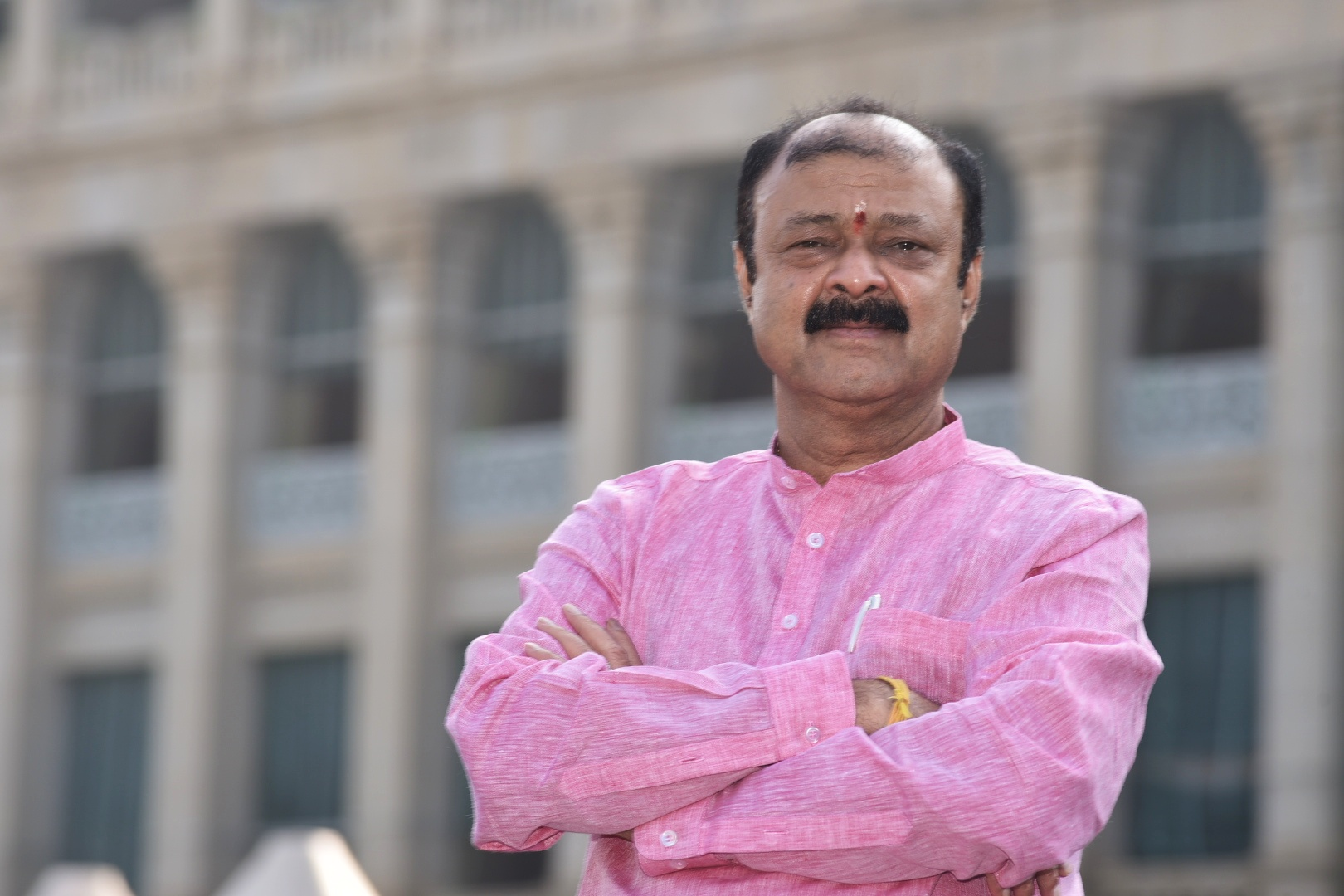

Cabinet Minister Government of Karnataka
- In office 6 February 2020 – 13 May 2023
- Ministry: Term
- Minister of Sericulture: 4 August 2021 - 13 May 2023
- Minister of Youth Empowerment & Sports: 21 January 2021 - 13 May 2023
- Minister of Planning, Programme Monitoring & Statistics: 21 January 2021 - 28 July 2021
- Minister of Municipal Administration Minister of Horticulture Minister of Sericulture: 6 February 2020 - 21 January 2021

Member of Karnataka Legislative Assembly
- In office 2013 – 13 May 2023
- Preceded by: K. B. Chandrasekhar
- Constituency: Krishnarajpet

Personal details
- Born: 21 July 1962 (age 63) Krishnarajpet, Mandya, Karnataka, India
- Party: Bharatiya Janata party (2019–present)
- Other political affiliations: Janata Dal (Secular) (2013-2019); Bahujan Samaj Party (till 2013)
- Spouse: Devaki
- Education: Bachelors in hotel management
- Website: www.kcn.gov.in

Dr. Chikkegowda Narayanagowda is an Indian social activist, politician who formerly served as Minister of Sericulture, Youth empowerment and sports of Karnataka from January 2021 to May 2023.

== Early life ==
Narayana Gowda was born on 21 July 1966 to Chikkegowda and Puttamma in Kaigonahalli, Krishnarajpet, Mandya, Karnataka.

Narayana Gowda has three brothers and two sisters. He studied up to seventh standard and was doing some odd jobs. At the age of 17, he left for Mumbai (then Bombay) in search of a livelihood. He started off as a driver in a hotel in Mumbai, like many youths of KR Pet and Nagamangala taluks. He worked even as a server in hotels, later as manager. He then opened a hotel, meanwhile, he completed SSLC and did a diploma in Hotel Management to equip himself better for the hospitality industry.

At present, Narayana Gowda owns three hotels. Besides, he also developed townships in Kolhapur. He is the founding director of Jayalakshmi Cooperative Bank in Mumbai. He is also the president of Horanadu Kannada Sangha in Mumbai.

Following success in business, Narayana Gowda started social service by donating books, uniforms, plates, tumblers and stationery items to students in schools. He used to organise free health camps and established vocational training centres in KR Pet taluk. Women were trained in operating mechanised sewing machines in the centres. Following his popularity in KR Pet taluk, due to his social work, his well-wishers inducted him into politics.

== Political career ==
He unsuccessfully contested on a BSP ticket in the 2008 Assembly polls. Then, he joined the JD(S) and won the 2013 and 2018 Assembly polls, despite many odds of being ill after filing his nomination and JD(S) Supremo issuing the party's ‘C’ form to another aspirant B.L. Devaraj, who had staged a protest along with his supporters in Krishnarajpet town in 2018. His assets were estimated to be Rs 9 crore and liabilities were around 1 crore in 2013, an increase from 7 crore assets in 2008, which further increased to 12 crores in 2018. He resigned (on 6 July 2019) as an MLA in 2019 and managed to get re-elected on a BJP ticket by defeating B.L. Devaraj of JD(S), who was given ‘C’ form during 2018 Assembly polls. This came as a surprise since JD(S) had a strong presence in both Mysuru and Mandya districts, where out of the 11 Assembly segments in Mysuru district, the JD(S) won five and swept all the seven seats in Mandya district in the 2018 Assembly polls. He accused women from Deve Gowda family for his decision to resign from his Assembly membership. Further he accused that they constantly interfered in the works of his constituency and supported his opponents and both Gowda and his son Chief Minister H. D. Kumaraswamy did not help despite repeated requests, finally accusing that he felt humiliated as the elected representatives like him were made to stand near the place where Deve Gowda's family kept their slippers. Even many other Party insiders of Janata Dal (Secular) had made similar accusations that Deve Gowda's six children, including daughters and also close aides interfere in the administration and transfers in one way or the other. They have been known to treat MLAs and MLCs with disrespect. Narayanagowda alleged that he suggested Nikhil Kumaraswamy not contest the Lok Sabha elections from Mandya since it will be a tough fight against Sumalatha Ambarish, who finally managed to win the polls. He claimed that a grant of Rs. 6 crore was given to his political opponent for taking up development work in his own constituency and then JD(S) State President A.H. Vishwanath (who also resigned the MLA post) was not given a free hand and remained as JD(S) State Unit President only in name.
