= K. Gopalaiah =

Indian politician

Minister of Excise department Government of Karnataka
- In office 21 January 2021 – 13 May 2023
- Chief Minister: B. S. Yediyurappa
- Preceded by: M. T. B. Nagaraj

Minister of Food, Civil supplies and Consumer affairs Government of Karnataka
- In office 06 February 2020 – 21 January 2021
- Chief Minister: B. S. Yediyurappa
- Preceded by: Shashikala Annasaheb Jolle
- Succeeded by: Umesh Katti

Member of the Karnataka Legislative Assembly
- Incumbent
- Assumed office 13 May 2013
- Preceded by: N. L. Narendra Babu
- Constituency: Mahalakshmi Layout

Personal details
- Born: 23 June 1960 (age 65) Bengaluru
- Party: Bharatiya Janata party (2019–present)
- Other political affiliations: Janata Dal (Secular) (till 2019)

Kamakshipalya Gopalaiah is an Indian politician who was serving as the Minister of Excise of Karnataka from 21 January 2021 till May 2023. He was elected to the Karnataka Legislative Assembly from Mahalakshmi Layout in the 2018 Karnataka Legislative Assembly election as a member of Janata Dal (Secular). Later, he joined the Bharatiya Janata Party in 2019 and won the by-elections the same year. He is now a Member of the Legislative Assembly of Karnataka, having won from Mahalakshmi Layout in Bangalore. His party, the Bharatiya Janata Party lost the election to the Indian National Congress.
