= K. Sudhakar (politician) =

Member of the Legislative Assembly, Chikkaballapur

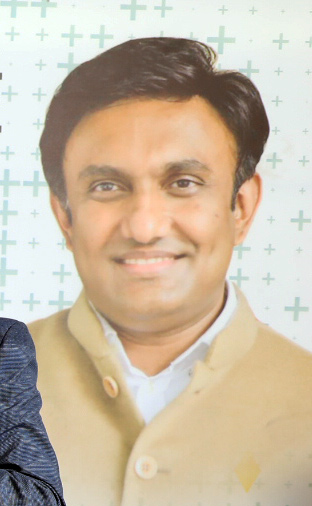
- Sudhakar in 2021

Member of Parliament, Lok Sabha
- Incumbent
- Assumed office 4 June 2024
- Preceded by: B. N. Bache Gowda
- Constituency: Chikballapur

Cabinet Minister Government of Karnataka
- In office 6 February 2020 – 13 May 2023
- Ministry: Term
- Minister of Health & Family Welfare: 12 October 2020 - 13 May 2023
- Minister of Medical Education: 6 February 2020 - 13 May 2023

Member of Karnataka Legislative Assembly
- In office 2013–2023
- Preceded by: K. P. Bache Gowda
- Succeeded by: Pradeep Eshwar
- Constituency: Chikballapur

Minister in-charge of Chikkaballapur District
- In office April 2020 – May 2023

Personal details
- Born: 27 June 1973 (age 52) Chikkaballapura, Karnataka, India
- Party: Bharatiya Janata party (2019–present)
- Other political affiliations: Indian National Congress (2013–2019)
- Spouse: Preethi
- Children: 3
- Education: Sri Siddhartha Medical College (M.B.B.S)

Keshavareddy Sudhakar is an Indian politician and also he was Ex-Minister of Medical Education and Health of Karnataka from 6 February 2020 to 13 May 2023. He was elected to the Karnataka Legislative Assembly from Chikkaballapur in the 2018 Karnataka Legislative Assembly election as a member of the Indian National Congress and later was re-elected to the house in 2019 as a member of the Bharatiya Janata Party. He also contested 2023 Karnataka Legislative Assembly election in Chikballapur from BJP but lost to INC candidate Pradeep Eshwar. In March 2024, he was announced as the BJP candidate from the Chikballapur Constituency for the 2024 Lok Sabha Elections. He was elected to the Lok Sabha from Chikkaballapur in the 18th Lok Sabha as a member of the Bharatiya Janata Party.

He was the youngest cabinet minister in the Fourth B. S. Yeddyurappa ministry being only 46 years old at the time of taking charge, serving as the Minister of Medical education from Health and Family Welfare Department. He was again sworn-in as a minister in the Basavaraj Bommai ministry.

During the COVID-19 pandemic in Karnataka he was part of the COVID-19 Response team for Karnataka along with Chief Minister B. S. Yeddyurappa and Minister of Health and Family Welfare B. Sriramulu and few others. He was key participant of key policy making and rapid response to the pandemic.

== Controversies ==
=== Operation Kamala ===
Operation Kamala (also spelled Operation Kamal, and sometimes referred to as Operation Lotus) is a term coined in 2008 to describe a political strategy used by the Bharatiya Janata Party (BJP) in the Indian state of Karnataka. The operation was led by former minister G. Janardhana Reddy and involved efforts to secure support from legislators of opposition parties. This approach enabled the BJP to bypass the provisions of the anti-defection law and achieve a majority in the state assembly.

The term "Kamala" (or "Kamal") refers to the lotus, which is the electoral symbol of the BJP. Operation Kamala is commonly used in Indian political discussions to describe strategies involving the inducement or persuasion of MLAs and MPs from other parties—particularly the Indian National Congress (INC)—to support the BJP in forming or maintaining power in state legislatures where it does not have an outright majority.

He was one of the 15 MLAs who fell in Operation Kamala and resigned in July 2019, effectively bringing down the H. D. Kumaraswamy-led coalition government of Indian National Congress and Janata Dal (Secular).
