= Byrati Basavaraj =

Indian politician

Byrathi Basavaraj

Minister of Urban Development (Excluding Bangalore) Government of Karnataka
- In office 20 February 2020 – 13 May 2023
- Governor: Vajubhai Vala
- Chief Minister: B. S. Yediyurappa
- Preceded by: U. T. Khadar

Member of Karnataka Legislative Assembly
- Incumbent
- Assumed office 13 May 2013
- Constituency: Krishnarajapuram

Personal details
- Born: 4 February 1964 (age 62) Byrathi
- Party: Bharatiya Janata party (2019–present)
- Other political affiliations: Indian National Congress (till 2019)
- Spouse: Smt. Padmavathi Basavaraj

Byrathi Basavaraj is an Indian politician who is a 4th time MLA and ex-Minister of Urban (excluding Bengaluru) Development of Karnataka from 4 August 2021. He started social service and entered politics and became panchayat member and president. He became corporator for Hoodi ward in 2009 and contested Krishnarajapura Vidhanasabha constituency (K R Puram) in 2013 and became MLA for the first time from congress. He became second time MLA in 2018 general elections from congress. In 2019 after his resignation, he contested from BJP in by election and won with a huge margin. Later he became minister for Urban Development in B S Yediyurappa cabinet and second term minister in Basavaraj Bommai cabinet. He won as 4th term MLA in 2023 assembly elections.

He was elected to the Karnataka Legislative Assembly from Krishnarajapura in the 2013 and 2018 Karnataka Legislative Assembly election as a member of the Indian National Congress. Byrathi Basavaraj took oath as Urban Development Minister in the presence of Chief Minister Basavaraj Bommai at Raj Bhavan, Bengaluru on 4 August 2021.
