= S. T. Somashekhar =

Indian politician (born 1957)

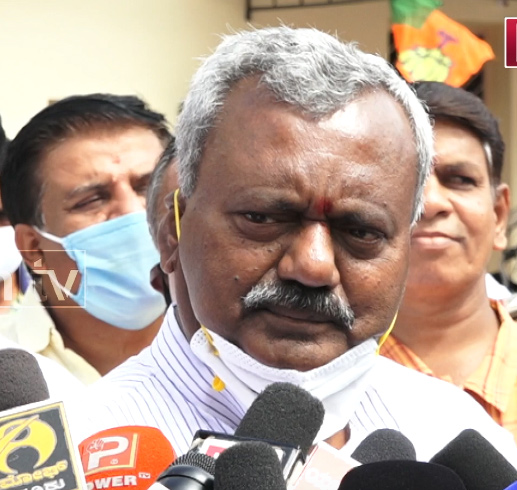
- S. T. Somashekhar (center) in 2020

Minister of Co-Operation Government of Karnataka
- In office 6 February 2020 – 13 May 2023
- Preceded by: Basavaraj Bommai, BJP

Member of the Karnataka Legislative Assembly
- Incumbent
- Assumed office 16 May 2018
- Preceded by: Shobha Karandlaje
- Constituency: Yeshvanthapura

Minister Incharge Of Mysore Government of Karnataka
- In office 10 April 2020 – 26 July 2021

Personal details
- Born: 1 June 1957 (age 68) Shettihalli, Channapatna
- Party: Bharatiya Janata party (2019–2025)
- Other political affiliations: Indian National Congress (till 2019)

Shettihalli Timmegowda Somashekhar Gowda is an Indian politician who was the Minister of State for Co-Operation of Karnataka from 6 February 2020 until 13 May 2023. He was elected to the Karnataka Legislative Assembly from Yeshvanthapura in the 2018 Karnataka Legislative Assembly election as a member of the Indian National Congress. He later switched to the Bharatiya Janata Party and won the by-election in 2019. He got re-elected on a BJP ticket in the 2023 Karnataka Legislative Assembly Election. As of 19 August 2023, speculations are rife that he may switch back to his old party, the INC, amidst allegations that local BJP leaders are hindering his political growth.
