= Karnataka Pragnyavantha Janatha Party =

- Abbreviation: KPJP
- President: Puthurina Muthu D. Mahesh Gowda
- Secretary: Girish Kumar
- Founder: Puthurina Muthu D. Mahesh Gowda
- Founded: 31 October 2016 (9 years ago); Registered on 3 February 2017
- Headquarters: No 23 2nd A main road 7th cross muneshwara layout, Srigandhanagar, Bengaluru, Karnataka - 560091
- Colours: White
- ECI status: Unrecognised Registered Party
- Alliance: NDA (2017, 2019-Present); UPA (2018)
- Seats in Karnataka Legislative Assembly: 0 / 224

Karnataka Pragnyavantha Janatha Party (abbr. KPJP) is an Indian political party based in Karnataka.

== History ==
Karnataka Pragnyavanta Janata Paksha was founded by Puthurina Muthu D. Mahesh Gowda. He started the party in January 2015, applied for official registration on 19 January 2016 and publicly announced it on 12 August 2017 under the 'Prajakeeya' campaign slogan. The party's official launch was on 31 October 2017 by veteran Kannada actor Upendra Rao.

The party believes in skill-driven leadership and politics with people being central. The official symbol of the party was announced on 9 December 2017 as the auto-rickshaw. The party intends to contest the upcoming elections for the Karnataka Legistaltive Assembly in 2018 and released its manifesto at the end of January 2018. On 6 March Upendra Rao announced that he had resigned from the party after a misunderstanding between him and D. Mahesh Gowda.

In the 2018 Karnataka Legislative Assembly election, R Shankar from Ranebennur constituency was elected. He supports the Congress-JD(S) alliance in the state.

On 17 May 2018, Shankar had changed his mind by supporting the Congress instead of the BJP.

During the Ongoing Karnataka Resignation crises, Shanker switched back to NDA on 8 July 2019 .
