= M. T. B. Nagaraj =

Indian politician

Minister of Small Scale Industries and Municipal Administration of Karnataka
- In office 4 August 2021 – 13 May 2023
- Preceded by: Himself
- Succeeded by: Sharanabassappa Darshanapur

Minister of Municipal administration, Sugarcane development and directorate of Sugar from Commerce & Industries department of Karnataka
- In office 21 January 2021 – 26 July 2021

Member of Legislative Assembly Karnataka
- In office 2018–2019
- Succeeded by: Sharath Kumar Bache Gowda
- Constituency: Hoskote
- In office 2013–2018
- Preceded by: B. N. Bache Gowda
- Constituency: Hoskote

Minister of Housing Government of Karnataka
- In office December 2018 – July 2019

Minister of Excise of Karnataka
- In office 21 January 2021 – 22 January 2021
- Preceded by: H. Nagesh
- Succeeded by: K. Gopalaiah

Personal details
- Born: 20 July 1951 (age 74) Garudacharpalya
- Party: Bharatiya Janata Party2019 present
- Other political affiliations: Indian National Congress (2001 to 2019 )

M. T. B. Nagaraj or N. Nagaraja (b 1952) is an Indian politician from Karnataka state and who was previously Minister of Small Scale Industries and Municipal Administration of Karnataka from 4 August 2021 to 13 May 2023. He is a member of Karnataka Legislative Council from Bharatiya Janata Party since 2020. Also he was district incharge of Bangalore Rural District from 24 June 2021 to date.

He was elected to Karnataka Vidhan Sabha from Hosakote (Vidhan Sabha constituency) as a Congress candidate in 2004, 2013 and 2018. He lost in 2008. He resigned from Congress in 2019, joined BJP, and contested again from Hosakote only to be defeated by the rebel BJP candidate Sharath Gowda. But BJP got him elected to the Legislative Council in 2020.

M. T. B. Nagaraj was one of the seventeen rebel MLAs who were disqualified by Speaker Ramesh Kumar of Karnataka Assembly for anti-party activities.

N. Nagaraj has been appointed as Karnataka Food and Civil Supplies Corporation Chairman in 2016.
