= Chikballapur Lok Sabha constituency =

Lok Sabha constituency in Karnataka

Coordinates: 13.4°N 77.7°E

Chikkballapur
- Lok Sabha constituency
- Chikballapur Constituency Map

Constituency details
- Country: India
- Region: South India
- State: Karnataka
- Assembly constituencies: Gauribidanur; Bagepalli; Chikkaballapur; Yelahanka; Hoskote; Devanahalli; Doddaballapur; Nelamangala
- Established: 1962
- Reservation: None

Member of Parliament
- 18th Lok Sabha
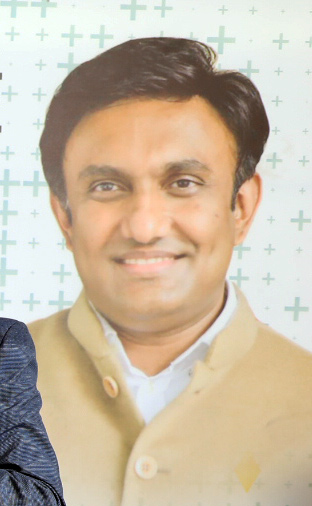
- Incumbent K. Sudhakar
- Party: Bharatiya Janata Party
- Elected year: 2024

Chikkballapur Lok Sabha constituency is one of the 28 Lok Sabha constituencies in Karnataka.

== Vidhan Sabha segments ==
Chikballapur Lok Sabha constituency presently comprises the following eight Legislative Assembly segments:

No	Name	District	Member	Party	Party Leading (in 2024)
139	Gauribidanur	Chikballapur	K. H. Puttaswamy Gowda	IND	BJP
140	Bagepalli	Chikballapur	S. N. Subbareddy	INC	INC
141	Chikkaballapur	Chikballapur	Pradeep Eshwar	INC	BJP
150	Yelahanka	Bangalore Urban	S. R. Vishwanath	BJP	BJP
178	Hoskote	Bangalore Rural	Sharath Kumar Bachegowda	INC	INC
179	Devanahalli (SC)	Bangalore Rural	K. H. Muniyappa	INC	BJP
180	Doddaballapur	Bangalore Rural	Dheeraj Muniraj	BJP	BJP
181	Nelamangala (SC)	Bangalore Rural	N. Shreenivasaiah	INC	BJP

== Members of Parliament ==
=== Mysore State ===
Year	Member	Party
1952-62 : See Kolar
1962	K. Chengalaraya Reddy	Indian National Congress
1967-77 : See Hoskote
1977	M. V. Krishnappa	Indian National Congress
1980	S. N. Prasan Kumar	Indian National Congress
1984	V. Krishna Rao	Indian National Congress
1989	V. Krishna Rao	Indian National Congress
1991	V. Krishna Rao	Indian National Congress
1996	R. L. Jalappa	Janata Dal
1998	R. L. Jalappa	Indian National Congress
1999	R. L. Jalappa	Indian National Congress
2004	R. L. Jalappa	Indian National Congress
2009	Veerappa Moily	Indian National Congress
2014	Veerappa Moily	Indian National Congress
2019	B. N. Bache Gowda	Bharatiya Janata Party
2024	K. Sudhakar	Bharatiya Janata Party

== Election results ==
=== General Election 2024 ===
2024 Indian general elections: Chikkballapur
Party	Candidate	Votes	%	±%
BJP	K. Sudhakar	822,619	53.93	▲0.15
INC	Raksha Ramaiah	659,159	43.21	▲2.56
NOTA	None of the Above	6,596	0.43	▼0.15
Majority		163,460	10.71	▼2.42
Turnout		1,531,043	77.26	▲0.52
BJP hold		Swing		

=== 2019 ===
2019 Indian general elections: Chikkballapur
Party	Candidate	Votes	%	±%
BJP	B. N. Bache Gowda	745,912	53.78	▲20.92
INC	M. Veerappa Moily	5,63,802	40.65	▲7.04
CPI(M)	S. Varalakshmi	28,648	1.34	▼0.72
BSP	Dr. C. S. Dwarakanath	23,446	1.69	
NOTA	None of the Above	8,025	0.58	▼0.03
Majority		1,82,110	13.13	▲12.38
Turnout		13,87,987	76.74	▲0.56
BJP gain from INC		Swing		

=== 2014 ===
2014 Indian general elections: Chikkballapur
Party	Candidate	Votes	%	±%
INC	M. Veerappa Moily	424,800	33.61	▼6.29
BJP	B. N. Bache Gowda	4,15,280	32.86	▼1.79
JD(S)	H. D. Kumaraswamy	3,46,339	27.40	▲8.39
CPI(M)	G. V. Sreerama Reddy	26,071	2.06	
NOTA	None of the Above	7,682	0.61	
Majority		9,520	0.75	▼4.5
Turnout		12,63,274	76.18	▲8.09
INC hold		Swing		

=== 2009 ===
2009 Indian general elections: Chikkballapur
Party	Candidate	Votes	%	±%
INC	M. Veerappa Moily	390,500	39.90	▼0.50
BJP	C. Aswathanarayana	3,39,119	34.65	New
JD(S)	C. R. Manohar	1,86,075	19.01	▼14.94
BSP	Hennuru Lakshmi Narayana	14,629	1.49	
Majority		51,381	5.25	▼1.20
Turnout		9,78,610	68.09	
INC hold		Swing		

=== 2004 Lok Sabha ===
2004 Indian general elections: Chikkballapur
Party	Candidate	Votes	%	±%
INC	R. L. Jalappa	376,204	40.40	
JD(S)	Shashi Kumar	316,182	33.95	
JD(U)	Ashok Krishnappa	191,766	20.59	
Majority		60,022	6.45	
Turnout				
INC hold		Swing		

=== 1977 Lok Sabha ===
- M. V. Krishnappa (INC) : 207,589 votes
- G. Narayana Gowda (Janata) : 159,115

== See also ==
- Hoskote Lok Sabha constituency
- Chikballapur district
- List of constituencies of the Lok Sabha
