= Emmvee Group =

Indian renewable energy company

- Type: Private
- Industry: Renewable energy
- Founded: 1992
- Founder: D.V. Manjunatha
- Headquarters: Bangaluru, Karnataka
- Area served: India
- Key people: D.V. Manjunatha (Founder and managing director)
- Revenue: ▲₹5,050 crore (US$530 million) (FY2026)
- Net income: ▲₹1,082 crore (US$110 million) (FY2026)
- Subsidiaries: Emmvee Photovoltaic Private Limited; Emmvee Solar System Private Limited; Emmvee Energy Private Limited (Unit-5)
- Website: emmvee.com

Emmvee Group is an Indian renewable energy company with its headquarters in Bengaluru, Karnataka, that manufactures solar photovoltaic (PV) modules and solar cells through its subsidiaries. Its subsidiary, Emmvee Photovoltaic Power Limited (formerly Emmvee Photovoltaic Power Private Limited), listed on the BSE and NSE on 18 November 2025 following an initial public offering.

== History ==
D. V. Manjunatha founded Emmvee Group in 1992, initially manufacturing thermal products before the company expanded into solar water heating systems. It moved into solar PV module manufacturing in 2006, and the following year established Emmvee Photovoltaic Private Limited in Bengaluru with an initial capacity of 15 MW. That capacity reached 500 MW by 2017 and roughly 4.6 GW by 2024. The company opened an additional 0.75 GW facility in 2022 and, in the same year, sold two solar power projects totaling 55 MW to O2 Power.

A research collaboration with Fraunhofer ISE, a German solar-energy research institute, began in February 2023 to develop high-efficiency TOPCon cell technology. By 2024, the company had commissioned a TOPCon solar cell manufacturing line with a capacity of approximately 2.5–2.94 GW. The company said it was the only Indian manufacturer, and one of four worldwide, to pass all tests under Kiwa PVEL's Product Qualification Program for a single product type that year.

=== Initial public offering ===
Emmvee Photovoltaic Power Limited's initial public offering ran from 11 to 13 November 2025, raising a total issue size of ₹2,900 crore (US$300 million) at a price band of ₹206 (US$2.20) per share. At the time of the offering, the company described itself as the second-largest pure-play integrated solar PV module and cell manufacturer in India by production capacity as of March 2025, with module capacity of 7.80 GW and cell capacity of 2.94 GW as of 31 May 2025.

== Operations and manufacturing ==
As of 31 March 2026, the company reported an aggregate installed manufacturing capacity of approximately 10.3 GW for solar PV modules, following a transition to TOPCon technology, and 2.94 GW for solar cells, across facilities in Karnataka. During FY2026, the company commissioned two additional 2.5 GW module manufacturing lines at Sulibele, Hoskote Taluk, Bengaluru, in May and December 2025.

The company has announced plans for a further 6 GW integrated cell-and-module manufacturing facility at Devanahalli, Bengaluru, targeting total installed capacity of 16.3 GW for modules and 8.9–8.94 GW for cells by FY2028. The Indian Renewable Energy Development Agency (IREDA) has sanctioned a term loan toward this expansion.

== Projects and partnerships ==
Emmvee has built a 1 MW rooftop solar installation at Cochin International Airport and a 40 MW ground-mounted solar plant spanning Karnataka's Bagepalli, Kunigal, and Bidar districts. In June 2024, NTPC Renewable Energy Ltd. placed a 795.4 MWp TOPCon module supply order with the company for the Khavda solar project in Gujarat.

== Awards and recognition ==
- National Award by the Ministry of New and Renewable Energy (MNRE)

== See also ==
- Solar power in India
- Renewable energy in India
