= Hoskote Lok Sabha constituency =

Former constituency of the Indian parliament in Karnataka

Coordinates: 13.07°N 77.79°E

Hoskote
- Former Lok Sabha constituency

Constituency details
- Country: India
- State: Mysore State
- Established: 1967
- Abolished: 1977
- Reservation: None

Hoskote Lok Sabha constituency was a former Lok Sabha constituency in Mysore State (Karnataka from 1967 to 1977). This seat came into existence in 1967 and ceased to exist in 1976, before 1977 Lok Sabha Elections. This constituency was later merged with Chikballapur Lok Sabha constituency. M. V. Krishnappa of the Indian National Congress was its only representative throughout its existence from 1967 to 1977.

== Assembly constituencies ==
The constituency comprised the following assembly constituencies:

- Malur
- Malleswaram
- Yelahanka
- Uttarahalli
- Varthur
- Doddaballapura
- Devanahalli
- Hoskote

== Members of Parliament ==
Year	Name	Party
1967	M. V. Krishnappa	Indian National Congress
1971	M. V. Krishnappa	Indian National Congress

== Election results ==
=== 1967 ===
1967 Indian general election: Hoskote
Party	Candidate	Votes	%	±%
INC	M. V. Krishnappa	160,374	54.61%	
Independent	S A Reddy	98,578	33.57%	
Majority				
Turnout		306,019	60.83%	
INC win (new seat)				

== See also ==
- Chikballapur Lok Sabha constituency
- Kolar Lok Sabha constituency
- Bangalore Rural district
- List of former constituencies of the Lok Sabha
