= S. R. Ramaiah =

Indian politician (died 2021)

Member of Karnataka Legislative Assembly
- In office 1957 - 1962
- Preceded by: Seat established
- Succeeded by: B. Chanabyre Gowda
- Constituency: Hosakote Devanahalli

President, Hosakote Taluk board

President, Sulibele Grama Pachayat

Member of College development board, Govt First Grade College, Sulibele
- In office 2017

Personal details
- Born: 1918/1919 Sulibele, Bangalore district, Mysore State, British India (now Karnataka, India)
- Died: 18 June 2021 (102 years) Bangalore, Karnataka, India
- Party: Indian National Congress

S. R. Ramaiah (died 18 June 2021), popularly known as Sooram Ramaiah, was an Indian freedom fighter, a Gandhian and a senior Indian National Congress politician. He was born in Sulibele. Later he became President of Sulibele Gram Panchayat before being elected as a President of Hosakote Taluk board. He was elected to Mysore Legislative Assembly from Hosakote Devanahalli seat in 1957 Mysore Assembly elections.
