= M. V. Krishnappa =

Indian politician (1918–1980)

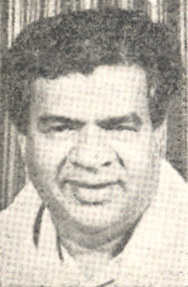
M.V. Krishnappa

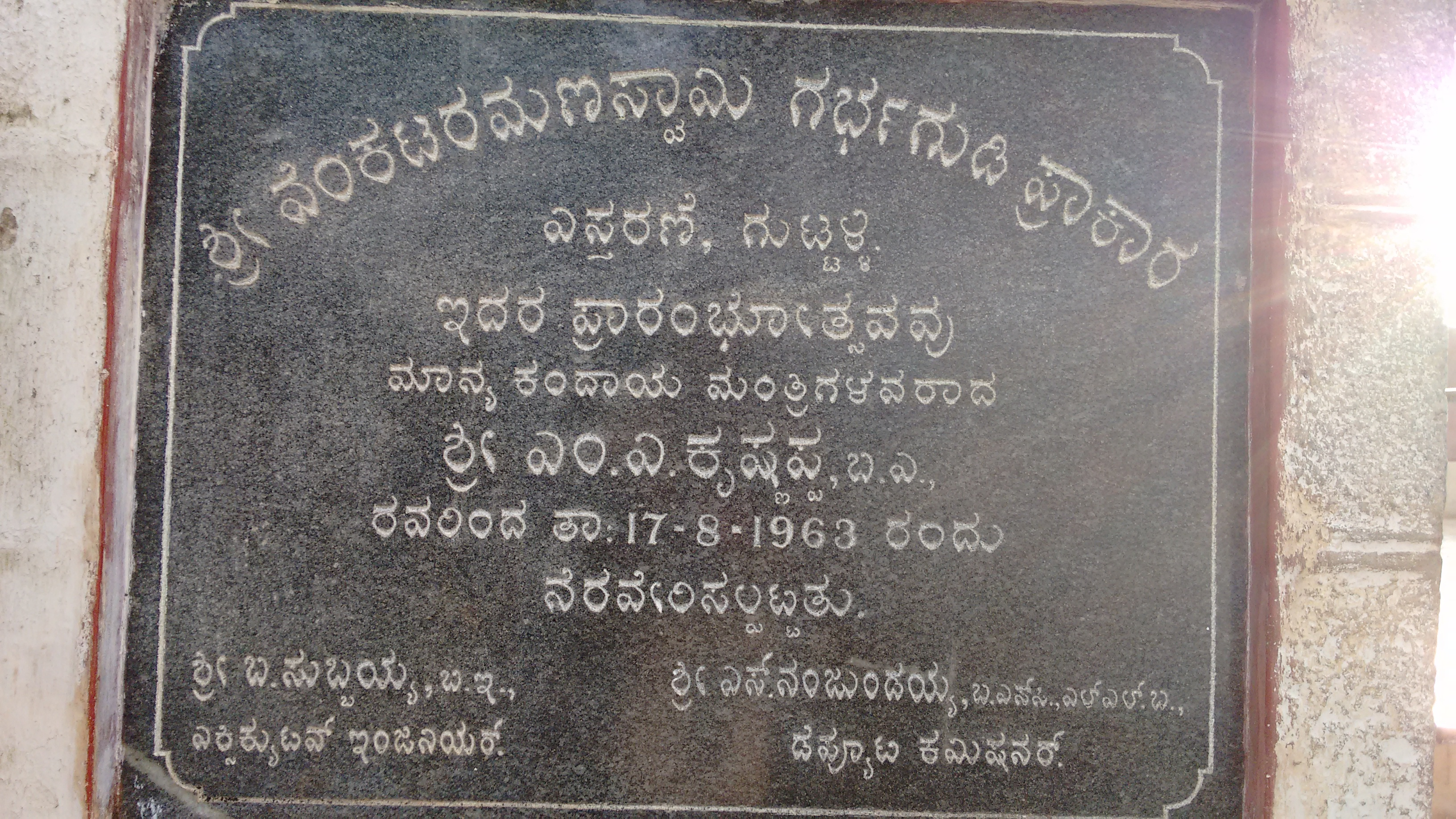
Renovation and expansion at Sri Lakshmi Venkateshwara Swamy Temple by M. V. Krishnappa at Bangaru Tirupathi, Hulkuru (Guttahalli)

Mothakapalli Venkatarame Gowda Krishnappa (1 July 1918 – 1 August 1980), popularly known and referred to as M.V.K. was an Indian Freedom Fighter, Indian National Congress Politician, Social Reformer and Educationist, rendered service for the upliftment of the rural masses throughout his career, the contributions of Krishnappa to Karnataka in general and Kolar & Chikkaballapur Districts, in particular, are noteworthy and is a household name to the people of these regions, particularly the farming community and the underprivileged hold his memory in gratitude.

He was a visionary who placed the well-being of the underprivileged at the heart of his ideals, believing that their progress and upliftment were essential to the nation's future.

== Early life and education ==
The ancestors of M.V.K. were close associates of Magadi Kempe Gowda and were custodians of his royal mint. They hailed from a hamlet called Roddam which is presently in Pavagada Taluk of Tumkur District. The ancestors of M.V.K. settled in Mothakpalli in Mulbagal Taluk of Kolar District, Karnataka. Even today the M.V.K. family is popularly known as Roddagaru Vokkaliga's indicating the place of their origin.

Into this religious family of agriculturists was born a third baby boy on 1/06/1918 to Venkatrame Gowda & Changamma, he was named Krishne Gowda, however, the boy re-christened himself at the age of 12 to M.V. Krishnappa. The ethical values nurtured through Folk Tales, Puranas and the lives of great men narrated by the grandmother to all the household children assembled, left a lasting impression on the young mind of Krishnappa.

Krishnappa had his primary education in his native village Mothakpalli, Middle School at Bangarpet and High School at KGF. He had a college education at the Intermediate College, Bangalore and Degree in Law from Maharaja's College Mysore.

== Quit India Movement & Freedom Struggle ==
During his high school years in KGF, Krishnappa observed poor working conditions and a lack of basic amenities for miners at the Tylor & Tylor company, despite its profitability. In response to suppressed working demands, Krishnappa organized the miners into a unified group and launched a movement of labor rights. Although Tylor & Tylor and local authorities initially resisted, the sustained agitation compelled the company to grant the requested amenities. This labor dispute marked Krishnappa's initial experience in leadership, establishing a foundation for his subsequent political activism alongside K.C.Reddy for Indian independence and the integration of the Princely State Of Mysore into the Union Of India.

The coming of M.K. Gandhi into the political scenario of India changed the course of the Freedom Struggle as well as Freedom Fighters respectively including the young Krishnappa. During his college days, Krishnappa was instrumental in urging young students to take up the cause and join the Quit India Movement against the British Raj, Seetharama Shantananda, a young student who gave up his dream of becoming a scholar and joined the movement under the leadership of Krishnappa recalled and wrote in the “Quit India Golden Jubilee Memoirs” that “Krishnaanna (Krishnappa being his first name and "Anna" in the local language being big brother) was a leader of an outstanding merit who inculcated the spirit of Patriotism in myself which ultimately made me jump into the freedom movement”. In 1939 Satyagraha movement started in KGF under the guidance of M.V.Krishnappa, M. Ramakrishnan, and Doraiswami of Kolar, the goal of the Satyagraha Camp was to intensify the agitation.

== Political career ==
Belonging to the Indian National Congress, Krishnappa was elected to the Lower House of Indian Parliament, the First Lok Sabha from Kolar from 1952 to 1957 at the age of 31, subsequently elected to Second Lok Sabha from Tumkur from 1957 to 1962, re-elected from Tumkur to the Third Lok Sabha from 1962 to 1967, elected from Hoskote from 1967 to 1970, re-elected from Hoskote from 1971 to 1977 from Mysore State and from Chikballapur in Karnataka in 1977–1979.

He vacated his seat Tumkur in 1962 to make way for Ajit Prasad Jain, who had lost from Kairana in 1962 Indian general elections against Yashpal Singh, an Independent candidate. Subsequently, he was inducted in S. R. Kanthi cabinet (1962) with Law & Parliamentary Affairs and Labour Portfolio, also nominated to Mysore Legislative Council on 14 May 1962 and remained as MLC till 6 March 1967 when he resigned following the nomination to Lok Sabha from Hoskote in 1967. He was inducted to Third Nijalingappa ministry in 1962 and was given the Revenue Portfolio till he was re-elected to Lok Sabha in 1967. He was instrumental in the Renovation and expansion of Sri Lakshmi Venkateshwara Swamy Temple, Bangaru Tirupathi, Guttahalli, Kolar district.

B. Rangappa was later nominated as MLC to his vacated seat on 3 May 1967 and got retired on 18 May 1970.

Krishnappa died in Bangalore on 1 August 1980, aged 62.

== Family ==
His brother M. V. Venkatappa was also a politician and was the Karnataka Legislative Assembly speaker from 1999 to 2004. They were born in a Vokkaliga family.

His nephew Rajeev Gowda, (son of M. V. Venkatappa) was also an Indian politician and academician. He was a former member of parliament in the Rajya Sabha from 26 June 2014 till 25 June 2020 and a national spokesperson for the Indian National Congress.
