= Nelamangala Assembly constituency =

Legislative Assembly constituency in Karnataka, India

Coordinates: 13.10°N 77.39°E

Nelamangala
- Constituency No. 181 for the Karnataka Legislative Assembly
- Map of Assembly constituency

Constituency details
- Country: India
- Region: South India
- State: Karnataka
- District: Bangalore Rural and Ramanagara
- Lok Sabha constituency: Chikkaballapur
- Established: 1951
- Total electors: 217,473
- Reservation: SC

Member of Legislative Assembly
- 16th Karnataka Legislative Assembly
- Incumbent N Srinivas
- Party: Indian National Congress
- Elected year: 2023
- Preceded by: K. Shrinivasamurthy

Nelamangala Assembly constituency is one of the 224 constituencies in the Karnataka Legislative Assembly of Karnataka, a southern state of India. It is also part of Chikballapur Lok Sabha constituency.

== Members of the Legislative Assembly ==
Election	Member	Party
1952	D. M. Govindaraju	Indian National Congress
1952	K. Prabhakar	Indian National Congress
1957	Alur Hanumanthappa	Indian National Congress
1957	Lokesvaniratha. M. Hanumanthaiah	Indian National Congress
1962	K. Prabhakar	Indian National Congress
1967	Alur Hanumanthappa	Indian National Congress
1972	H. Maregowda	Independent politician
1978	K. Prabhakar	Indian National Congress
1983	Sathyanarayana. M. G	Janata Party
1985	B. Guruprasad	Janata Party
1989	Anjana Murthy	Indian National Congress
1994	Dr. M. Shankar Naik	Janata Dal
1999	Anjana Murthy	Indian National Congress
2004	Anjana Murthy	Indian National Congress
2008	M. V. Nagaraju	Bharatiya Janata Party
2013	Dr. K. Sreenivasamurthy	Janata Dal
2018	Dr. K. Sreenivasamurthy	Janata Dal
2023	N. Shreenivasaiah	Indian National Congress

== Election results ==
=== Assembly Election 2023 ===
2023 Karnataka Legislative Assembly election : Nelamangala
Party	Candidate	Votes	%	±%
INC	N. Shreenivasaiah	84,229	48.72%	▲20.87
JD(S)	Dr. K. Sreenivasamurthy	52,251	30.22%	▼12.69
BJP	Sapthagiri Shankarnaik	30,582	17.69%	▼8.75
AAP	B. M. Gangabylappa	1,650	0.95%	New
UPP	Narasimhamurthy. G	1,327	0.77%	New
NOTA	None of the above	979	0.57%	▼0.14
Margin of victory		31,978	18.50%	▲3.43
Turnout		174,389	80.19%	▲0.77
Total valid votes		172,882		
Registered electors		217,473		▲6.73
INC gain from JD(S)		Swing	▲5.81	

=== Assembly Election 2018 ===
2018 Karnataka Legislative Assembly election : Nelamangala
Party	Candidate	Votes	%	±%
JD(S)	Dr. K. Sreenivasamurthy	69,277	42.91%	▲7.34
INC	R. Narayanaswamy	44,956	27.85%	▲1.16
BJP	M. V. Nagaraju	42,689	26.44%	▲15.05
NOTA	None of the above	1,151	0.71%	New
Margin of victory		24,321	15.07%	▲6.19
Turnout		161,828	79.42%	▲2.54
Total valid votes		161,435		
Registered electors		203,761		▲11.81
JD(S) hold		Swing	▲7.34	

=== Assembly Election 2013 ===
2013 Karnataka Legislative Assembly election : Nelamangala
Party	Candidate	Votes	%	±%
JD(S)	Dr. K. Sreenivasamurthy	60,492	35.57%	▲6.82
INC	Anjana Murthy	45,389	26.69%	▼4.40
BJP	M. V. Nagaraju	19,368	11.39%	▼21.57
KJP	Cheluvaraju. H. P	9,821	5.77%	New
Margin of victory		15,103	8.88%	▲7.01
Turnout		140,103	76.88%	▲6.75
Total valid votes		170,066		
Registered electors		182,244		▲11.13
JD(S) gain from BJP		Swing	▲2.61	

=== Assembly Election 2008 ===
2008 Karnataka Legislative Assembly election : Nelamangala
Party	Candidate	Votes	%	±%
BJP	M. V. Nagaraju	37,892	32.96%	▲4.68
INC	Anjana Murthy	35,741	31.09%	▼1.12
JD(S)	Dr. K. Sreenivasamurthy	33,057	28.75%	▲1.24
JD(U)	Dr. M. Shankar Naik	4,038	3.51%	New
Independent	Lawyer Ramaiah	1,668	1.45%	New
BSP	Krishnamurthy. T	1,057	0.92%	▼1.15
SP	Vijayabhaskar. N	846	0.74%	New
Margin of victory		2,151	1.87%	▼2.06
Turnout		115,005	70.13%	▲6.25
Total valid votes		114,970		
Registered electors		163,985		▼10.20
BJP gain from INC		Swing	▲0.75	

=== Assembly Election 2004 ===
2004 Karnataka Legislative Assembly election : Nelamangala
Party	Candidate	Votes	%	±%
INC	Anjana Murthy	37,578	32.21%	▼32.90
BJP	B. Guruprasad	32,992	28.28%	New
JD(S)	Shankar Naik. M	32,085	27.51%	▲23.75
Independent	Cheluvaraju. H. P	5,807	4.98%	New
BSP	Ramappa	2,416	2.07%	New
JP	Shankarrao. K. N	1,912	1.64%	New
Independent	Chandrashekaraiah. S	1,185	1.02%	New
Independent	Bhaskar Prasad. B. R	1,080	0.93%	New
Kannada Nadu Party	Gaviyappa. B. H	824	0.71%	New
Margin of victory		4,586	3.93%	▼30.05
Turnout		116,650	63.88%	▼3.85
Total valid votes		116,650		
Registered electors		182,609		▲20.43
INC hold		Swing	▼32.90	

=== Assembly Election 1999 ===
1999 Karnataka Legislative Assembly election : Nelamangala
Party	Candidate	Votes	%	±%
INC	Anjana Murthy	64,682	65.11%	▲25.77
JD(U)	Dr. M. Shankar Naik	30,925	31.13%	New
JD(S)	Kempamma	3,731	3.76%	New
Margin of victory		33,757	33.98%	▲30.68
Turnout		102,695	67.73%	▼5.20
Total valid votes		99,338		
Rejected ballots		3,217	3.13%	▲1.68
Registered electors		151,629		▲17.75
INC gain from JD		Swing	▲22.47	

=== Assembly Election 1994 ===
1994 Karnataka Legislative Assembly election : Nelamangala
Party	Candidate	Votes	%	±%
JD	Dr. M. Shankar Naik	39,459	42.64%	▲15.02
INC	Anjana Murthy	36,408	39.34%	▼12.93
BJP	L. S. Ravi Prakash	13,384	14.46%	New
Independent	B. Guruprasad	1,558	1.68%	New
INC	N. Murthy	602	0.65%	New
Margin of victory		3,051	3.30%	▼21.35
Turnout		93,909	72.93%	▲1.36
Total valid votes		92,546		
Rejected ballots		1,363	1.45%	▼2.63
Registered electors		128,767		▲13.59
JD gain from INC		Swing	▼9.63	

=== Assembly Election 1989 ===
1989 Karnataka Legislative Assembly election : Nelamangala
Party	Candidate	Votes	%	±%
INC	Anjana Murthy	40,675	52.27%	▲14.97
JD	Dr. M. Shankar Naik	21,491	27.62%	New
JP	B. Guruprasad	14,055	18.06%	New
Bharatiya Rashtriya Party	Ramappa	1,027	1.32%	New
Margin of victory		19,184	24.65%	▼0.76
Turnout		81,132	71.57%	▼3.12
Total valid votes		77,820		
Rejected ballots		3,312	4.08%	▲2.78
Registered electors		113,364		▲34.48
INC gain from JP		Swing	▼10.43	

=== Assembly Election 1985 ===
1985 Karnataka Legislative Assembly election : Nelamangala
Party	Candidate	Votes	%	±%
JP	B. Guruprasad	38,967	62.70%	▲6.56
INC	Anjana Murthy	23,177	37.30%	▼0.09
Margin of victory		15,790	25.41%	▲6.65
Turnout		62,962	74.69%	▲8.47
Total valid votes		62,144		
Rejected ballots		818	1.30%	▼0.24
Registered electors		84,298		▲9.49
JP hold		Swing	▲6.56	

=== Assembly Election 1983 ===
1983 Karnataka Legislative Assembly election : Nelamangala
Party	Candidate	Votes	%	±%
JP	Sathyanarayana. M. G	28,185	56.14%	▲14.75
INC	Anjana Murthy	18,769	37.39%	▲34.98
LKD	Hanumanthappa	1,739	3.46%	New
BJP	Gangaraju	354	0.71%	New
Independent	Gopal. C	335	0.67%	New
Independent	Gangaiah	321	0.64%	New
Margin of victory		9,416	18.76%	▲16.03
Turnout		50,985	66.22%	▼1.53
Total valid votes		50,201		
Rejected ballots		784	1.54%	▼0.77
Registered electors		76,990		▲8.78
JP gain from INC(I)		Swing	▲12.02	

=== Assembly Election 1978 ===
1978 Karnataka Legislative Assembly election : Nelamangala
Party	Candidate	Votes	%	±%
INC(I)	K. Prabhakar	20,666	44.12%	New
JP	Doddathimmaiah	19,388	41.39%	New
Independent	H. Ravi	3,995	8.53%	New
Independent	B. Gangabyraiah	1,396	2.98%	New
INC	T. Kempahanumaiah	1,130	2.41%	▼41.02
Margin of victory		1,278	2.73%	▼10.41
Turnout		47,947	67.75%	▲8.25
Total valid votes		46,838		
Rejected ballots		1,109	2.31%	▲2.31
Registered electors		70,773		▲5.91
INC(I) gain from Independent		Swing	▼12.45	

=== Assembly Election 1972 ===
1972 Mysore State Legislative Assembly election : Nelamangala
Party	Candidate	Votes	%	±%
Independent	H. Maregowda	21,977	56.57%	New
INC	T. V. Manumantharaju	16,871	43.43%	▼12.78
Margin of victory		5,106	13.14%	▼11.25
Turnout		39,758	59.50%	▼3.12
Total valid votes		38,848		
Registered electors		66,822		▲25.00
Independent gain from INC		Swing	▲0.36	

=== Assembly Election 1967 ===
1967 Mysore State Legislative Assembly election : Nelamangala
Party	Candidate	Votes	%	±%
INC	A. Hanumanthappa	17,508	56.21%	▲2.73
Independent	H. Maregowda	9,911	31.82%	New
Independent	M. Channappa	2,538	8.15%	New
Independent	Gavithimmaiah	691	2.22%	New
Independent	A. Hanumaiah	501	1.61%	New
Margin of victory		7,597	24.39%	▲4.96
Turnout		33,478	62.62%	▲13.47
Total valid votes		31,149		
Registered electors		53,458		▲27.05
INC hold		Swing	▲2.73	

=== Assembly Election 1962 ===
1962 Mysore State Legislative Assembly election : Nelamangala
Party	Candidate	Votes	%	±%
INC	K. Prabhakar	10,352	53.48%	▼20.00
Independent	Lokesvaniratha. M. Hanumanthaiah	6,591	34.05%	New
Independent	M. Muniyappa	2,413	12.47%	New
Margin of victory		3,761	19.43%	▼15.68
Turnout		20,680	49.15%	▲7.98
Total valid votes		19,356		
Registered electors		42,078		▼49.44
INC hold		Swing	▲10.49	

=== Assembly Election 1957 ===
1957 Mysore State Legislative Assembly election : Nelamangala
Party	Candidate	Votes	%	±%
INC	Alur Hanumanthappa	29,458	42.99%	▲1.63
INC	Lokesvaniratha. M. Hanumanthaiah	20,897	30.49%	▼10.87
Independent	Nanjappa	5,399	7.88%	New
Independent	M. Muniyappa	4,675	6.82%	New
Independent	Dugle Gowda	3,201	4.67%	New
PSP	V. Chickayellappa	2,761	4.03%	New
PSP	Thimmegowda	2,135	3.12%	New
Margin of victory		24,059	35.11%	▲28.14
Turnout		68,526	41.17%	▼32.18
Total valid votes		68,526		
Registered electors		83,219		▲8.99
INC hold		Swing	▲16.62	

=== Assembly Election 1952 ===
1952 Mysore State Legislative Assembly election : Nelamangala
Party	Candidate	Votes	%	±%
INC	D. M. Govindaraju	14,771	26.37%	New
KMPP	A. B. Hanumantharaya	10,865	19.40%	New
INC	K. Prabhakar	8,394	14.99%	New
ABJS	Honnasiddaiah	7,616	13.60%	New
Independent	K. Krishanappa	4,779	8.53%	New
KMPP	M. Muniyappa	3,845	6.86%	New
Independent	G. Chennasomanna	2,944	5.26%	New
Socialist	Thimmarayappa	1,417	2.53%	New
Independent	Gangappa. N. Karanikaru	1,378	2.46%	New
Margin of victory		3,906	6.97%	
Turnout		56,009	36.68%	
Total valid votes		56,009		
Registered electors		76,356		
INC win (new seat)				

== See also ==
- Bangalore Rural district
- List of constituencies of Karnataka Legislative Assembly
