= Bagepalli Assembly constituency =

Constituency of the Karnataka Legislative Assembly in India

Coordinates: 13.77°N 77.80°E

Bagepalli
- Constituency No. 140 for the Karnataka Legislative Assembly
- Map of Assembly constituency

Constituency details
- Country: India
- Region: South India
- State: Karnataka
- District: Chikkaballapur
- Lok Sabha constituency: Chikkaballapur
- Established: 1962
- Total electors: 201,055
- Reservation: None

Member of Legislative Assembly
- 16th Karnataka Legislative Assembly
- Incumbent S. N. Subbareddy
- Party: Indian National Congress
- Elected year: 2023
- Preceded by: N. Sampangi

Bagepalli Assembly constituency is one of the 224 constituencies in the Karnataka Legislative Assembly of Karnataka, a southern state of India. It is also part of Chikballapur Lok Sabha constituency.

== Members of the Legislative Assembly ==
| Election | Member | Party |
|---|---|---|
| 1962 | B. Subbarayappa | Indian National Congress |
| 1967 | A. Muniyappa | Indian National Congress |
| 1972 | Renuka Rajendran | Indian National Congress |
| 1978 | S. Muni Kaju | Indian National Congress |
| 1983 | A. V. Appaswamy Reddy | Communist Party of India |
| 1985 | B. Narayana Swamy | Indian National Congress |
| 1989 | C. V. Venkatarayappa | Indian National Congress |
| 1994 | G. V. Sreerama Reddy | Communist Party of India |
| 1999 | Sampangi. N | Independent politician |
| 2004 | G. V. Sreerama Reddy | Communist Party of India |
| 2008 | Sampangi. N | Indian National Congress |
| 2013 | S. N. Subbareddy | Independent politician |
| 2018 | S. N. Subbareddy | Indian National Congress |
| 2023 | S. N. Subbareddy | Indian National Congress |

== Election results ==
=== Assembly Election 2023 ===
2023 Karnataka Legislative Assembly election : Bagepalli
| Party | Candidate | Votes | % | ±% |
|---|---|---|---|---|
| INC | S. N. Subbareddy | 82,128 | 47.37% | ▲7.43 |
| BJP | C. Muniraju | 62,949 | 36.31% | ▲33.79 |
| CPI(M) | Dr. A. Anil Kumar | 19,621 | 11.32% | New |
| Independent | Mithun Reddy | 2,723 | 1.57% | New |
| KRPP | C. Krishna Reddy | 1,598 | 0.92% | New |
| AAP | Dr. Madhu Seethappa | 1,454 | 0.84% | New |
| NOTA | None of the above | 1,003 | 0.58% | ▲0.17 |
| Margin of victory | | 19,179 | 11.06% | ▲2.54 |
| Turnout | | 173,400 | 86.25% | ▲3.14 |
| Total valid votes | | 173,372 | | |
| Registered electors | | 201,055 | | ▲1.55 |
| INC hold | | Swing | ▲7.43 | |

=== Assembly Election 2018 ===
2018 Karnataka Legislative Assembly election : Bagepalli
| Party | Candidate | Votes | % | ±% |
|---|---|---|---|---|
| INC | S. N. Subbareddy | 65,710 | 39.94% | ▲29.38 |
| CPI(M) | G. V. Sreerama Reddy | 51,697 | 31.42% | ▲7.24 |
| JD(S) | Dr. C. R. Manohar | 38,302 | 23.28% | ▲11.84 |
| BJP | P. Saikumar | 4,140 | 2.52% | ▲1.78 |
| NOTA | None of the above | 680 | 0.41% | New |
| Margin of victory | | 14,013 | 8.52% | ▼12.44 |
| Turnout | | 164,541 | 83.11% | ▼2.44 |
| Total valid votes | | 164,528 | | |
| Registered electors | | 197,982 | | ▲12.54 |
| INC gain from Independent | | Swing | ▼5.20 | |

=== Assembly Election 2013 ===
2013 Karnataka Legislative Assembly election : Bagepalli
| Party | Candidate | Votes | % | ±% |
|---|---|---|---|---|
| Independent | S. N. Subbareddy | 66,227 | 45.14% | New |
| CPI(M) | G. V. Sreerama Reddy | 35,472 | 24.18% | ▼0.92 |
| JD(S) | Harinathareddy | 16,779 | 11.44% | ▼10.95 |
| INC | Sampangi. N | 15,491 | 10.56% | ▼15.30 |
| Independent | R. N. Raghunath Reddy | 2,478 | 1.69% | New |
| Independent | Venkataravana Reddy | 1,666 | 1.14% | New |
| Independent | S. N Subbareddy | 1,510 | 1.03% | New |
| Independent | K. A. Srinath | 1,184 | 0.81% | New |
| BJP | M. Narayanaswamy | 1,084 | 0.74% | ▼20.16 |
| Margin of victory | | 30,755 | 20.96% | ▲20.21 |
| Turnout | | 150,506 | 85.55% | ▲6.75 |
| Total valid votes | | 146,709 | | |
| Registered electors | | 175,924 | | ▲11.02 |
| Independent gain from INC | | Swing | ▲19.28 | |

=== Assembly Election 2008 ===
2008 Karnataka Legislative Assembly election : Bagepalli
| Party | Candidate | Votes | % | ±% |
|---|---|---|---|---|
| INC | Sampangi. N | 32,244 | 25.86% | ▼16.01 |
| CPI(M) | G. V. Sreerama Reddy | 31,306 | 25.10% | ▼26.91 |
| JD(S) | Nagaraja Reddy. D. J | 27,926 | 22.39% | New |
| BJP | Sai Kumar. P | 26,070 | 20.90% | ▲17.87 |
| BSP | Narasa Reddy. B | 2,315 | 1.86% | New |
| Independent | Babajan | 1,146 | 0.92% | New |
| Independent | S. V. Kodanda Rama | 1,129 | 0.91% | New |
| Independent | Krishnappa | 752 | 0.60% | New |
| Margin of victory | | 938 | 0.75% | ▼9.39 |
| Turnout | | 124,873 | 78.80% | ▲4.03 |
| Total valid votes | | 124,709 | | |
| Registered electors | | 158,459 | | ▲7.81 |
| INC gain from CPI(M) | | Swing | ▼26.15 | |

=== Assembly Election 2004 ===
2004 Karnataka Legislative Assembly election : Bagepalli
| Party | Candidate | Votes | % | ±% |
|---|---|---|---|---|
| CPI(M) | G. V. Sreerama Reddy | 57,132 | 52.01% | ▲17.09 |
| INC | Sampangi. N | 45,997 | 41.87% | ▲19.02 |
| BJP | Narasa Reddy. B | 3,331 | 3.03% | New |
| Kannada Nadu Party | Nagaraj. S. M | 2,107 | 1.92% | New |
| Independent | Rahathunnisa | 1,279 | 1.16% | New |
| Margin of victory | | 11,135 | 10.14% | ▲7.02 |
| Turnout | | 109,899 | 74.77% | ▼1.66 |
| Total valid votes | | 109,846 | | |
| Registered electors | | 146,978 | | ▲4.98 |
| CPI(M) gain from Independent | | Swing | ▲13.97 | |

=== Assembly Election 1999 ===
1999 Karnataka Legislative Assembly election : Bagepalli
| Party | Candidate | Votes | % | ±% |
|---|---|---|---|---|
| Independent | Sampangi. N | 40,183 | 38.04% | New |
| CPI(M) | G. V. Sreerama Reddy | 36,885 | 34.92% | ▼5.40 |
| INC | Nagaraja Reddy. D. J | 24,134 | 22.85% | ▼10.22 |
| JD(U) | Reddy. G. K | 3,473 | 3.29% | New |
| Independent | Penchalaiah. P. N | 966 | 0.91% | New |
| Margin of victory | | 3,298 | 3.12% | ▼4.13 |
| Turnout | | 107,001 | 76.43% | ▲2.55 |
| Total valid votes | | 105,641 | | |
| Registered electors | | 140,006 | | ▲12.70 |
| Independent gain from CPI(M) | | Swing | ▼2.28 | |

=== Assembly Election 1994 ===
1994 Karnataka Legislative Assembly election : Bagepalli
| Party | Candidate | Votes | % | ±% |
|---|---|---|---|---|
| CPI(M) | G. V. Sreerama Reddy | 35,851 | 40.32% | ▼4.77 |
| INC | P. N. Padmanabha Rao | 29,405 | 33.07% | ▼14.08 |
| JD | B. Narayanappa | 17,616 | 19.81% | New |
| INC | B. R. Narasimha Naidu | 2,581 | 2.90% | New |
| Independent | Srinivasa | 2,218 | 2.49% | New |
| BJP | A. Ramesh | 1,251 | 1.41% | New |
| Margin of victory | | 6,446 | 7.25% | ▲5.19 |
| Turnout | | 91,777 | 73.88% | ▼1.74 |
| Total valid votes | | 88,922 | | |
| Registered electors | | 124,227 | | ▲10.64 |
| CPI(M) gain from INC | | Swing | ▼6.83 | |

=== Assembly Election 1989 ===
1989 Karnataka Legislative Assembly election : Bagepalli
| Party | Candidate | Votes | % | ±% |
|---|---|---|---|---|
| INC | C. V. Venkatarayappa | 37,265 | 47.15% | ▲11.77 |
| CPI(M) | G. V. Sreerama Reddy | 35,639 | 45.09% | ▲13.19 |
| JP | P. S. Subbareddy | 3,306 | 4.18% | New |
| Independent | Channakrishnappa | 1,065 | 1.35% | New |
| Independent | R. Lalithamma | 637 | 0.81% | New |
| Margin of victory | | 1,626 | 2.06% | ▼1.42 |
| Turnout | | 84,908 | 75.62% | ▲11.23 |
| Total valid votes | | 79,031 | | |
| Registered electors | | 112,283 | | ▲22.39 |
| INC hold | | Swing | ▲11.77 | |

=== Assembly Election 1985 ===
1985 Karnataka Legislative Assembly election : Bagepalli
| Party | Candidate | Votes | % | ±% |
|---|---|---|---|---|
| INC | B. Narayana Swamy | 20,454 | 35.38% | ▼4.36 |
| CPI(M) | G. V. Sreerama Reddy | 18,444 | 31.90% | ▼26.87 |
| Independent | B. Narayanappa | 9,982 | 17.27% | New |
| Independent | D. N. Reddy | 6,673 | 11.54% | New |
| Independent | C. S. Noor Ahamad | 1,025 | 1.77% | New |
| Margin of victory | | 2,010 | 3.48% | ▼15.55 |
| Turnout | | 59,072 | 64.39% | ▼9.32 |
| Total valid votes | | 57,811 | | |
| Registered electors | | 91,745 | | ▲8.44 |
| INC gain from CPI(M) | | Swing | ▼23.39 | |

=== Assembly Election 1983 ===
1983 Karnataka Legislative Assembly election : Bagepalli
| Party | Candidate | Votes | % | ±% |
|---|---|---|---|---|
| CPI(M) | A. V. Appaswamy Reddy | 35,699 | 58.77% | ▲44.46 |
| INC | S. Muniraju | 24,137 | 39.74% | ▲21.60 |
| Independent | Lalithamma | 908 | 1.49% | New |
| Margin of victory | | 11,562 | 19.03% | ▼10.29 |
| Turnout | | 62,365 | 73.71% | ▼1.38 |
| Total valid votes | | 60,744 | | |
| Rejected ballots | | 1,621 | 2.60% | ▼0.73 |
| Registered electors | | 84,608 | | ▲7.74 |
| CPI(M) gain from INC(I) | | Swing | ▲11.31 | |

=== Assembly Election 1978 ===
1978 Karnataka Legislative Assembly election : Bagepalli
| Party | Candidate | Votes | % | ±% |
|---|---|---|---|---|
| INC(I) | S. Muni Kaju | 27,052 | 47.46% | New |
| INC | V. Krishna Rao | 10,337 | 18.14% | ▼36.86 |
| JP | T. L. Chandrashekhara Reddy | 8,454 | 14.83% | New |
| CPI(M) | A. V. Appaswamy Reddy | 8,158 | 14.31% | New |
| Independent | N. Adi Murthy | 1,605 | 2.82% | New |
| Independent | Lalithamma | 846 | 1.48% | New |
| Independent | Abdul Latheif Khan | 548 | 0.96% | New |
| Margin of victory | | 16,715 | 29.32% | ▼6.21 |
| Turnout | | 58,966 | 75.09% | ▲29.86 |
| Total valid votes | | 57,000 | | |
| Rejected ballots | | 1,966 | 3.33% | ▲3.33 |
| Registered electors | | 78,528 | | ▼3.38 |
| INC(I) gain from INC | | Swing | ▼7.54 | |

=== Assembly Election 1972 ===
1972 Mysore State Legislative Assembly election : Bagepalli
| Party | Candidate | Votes | % | ±% |
|---|---|---|---|---|
| INC | Renuka Rajendran | 19,461 | 55.00% | ▲3.38 |
| Independent | A. Muniyappa | 6,890 | 19.47% | New |
| Independent | G. Narayanaswamy | 5,317 | 15.03% | New |
| Independent | N. Muniswamy | 2,253 | 6.37% | New |
| INC(O) | M. Ramaiah | 1,460 | 4.13% | New |
| Margin of victory | | 12,571 | 35.53% | ▲13.31 |
| Turnout | | 36,760 | 45.23% | ▼3.83 |
| Total valid votes | | 35,381 | | |
| Registered electors | | 81,279 | | ▲15.19 |
| INC hold | | Swing | ▲3.38 | |

=== Assembly Election 1967 ===
1967 Mysore State Legislative Assembly election : Bagepalli
| Party | Candidate | Votes | % | ±% |
|---|---|---|---|---|
| INC | A. Muniyappa | 16,517 | 51.62% | ▲0.85 |
| CPI(M) | N. Adinarayana | 9,408 | 29.40% | New |
| Independent | T. Thirumalaiah | 4,987 | 15.59% | New |
| Independent | Venkatarayappa | 1,083 | 3.38% | New |
| Margin of victory | | 7,109 | 22.22% | ▲20.68 |
| Turnout | | 34,619 | 49.06% | ▲2.98 |
| Total valid votes | | 31,995 | | |
| Registered electors | | 70,561 | | ▲16.37 |
| INC hold | | Swing | ▲0.85 | |

=== Assembly Election 1962 ===
1962 Mysore State Legislative Assembly election : Bagepalli
| Party | Candidate | Votes | % | ±% |
|---|---|---|---|---|
| INC | B. Subbarayappa | 12,949 | 50.77% | New |
| Independent | K. M. Muniyappa | 12,556 | 49.23% | New |
| Margin of victory | | 393 | 1.54% | |
| Turnout | | 27,941 | 46.08% | |
| Total valid votes | | 25,505 | | |
| Registered electors | | 60,634 | | |
| INC gain from | | | | |

== See also ==
- Chikballapur district
- List of constituencies of Karnataka Legislative Assembly
