= B. N. Bache Gowda =

Politician from Karnataka, India

Member of Parliament, Lok Sabha
- In office 2019 – 4 June 2024
- Preceded by: Veerappa Moily
- Succeeded by: K. Sudhakar
- Constituency: Chikballapur

Cabinet Minister Government of Karnataka
- In office 7 June 2008 – 13 May 2013
- Ministry: Term
- Minister of Labour: 7 June 2008 - 13 May 2013

Member of Karnataka Legislative Assembly
- In office 2008–2013
- Preceded by: M. T. B. Nagaraj
- Succeeded by: M. T. B. Nagaraj
- Constituency: Hoskote
- In office 1994–2004
- Preceded by: N Chikke Gowda
- Succeeded by: M. T. B. Nagaraj
- Constituency: Hoskote
- In office 1985–1989
- Preceded by: N Chikke Gowda
- Succeeded by: N Chikke Gowda
- Constituency: Hoskote
- In office 1978–1983
- Preceded by: N Chikke Gowda
- Succeeded by: N Chikke Gowda
- Constituency: Hoskote

Personal details
- Born: 1 October 1942 (age 83) Bendiganahalli, Bangalore Rural, Karnataka
- Party: Indian National Congress (2024–present)
- Other political affiliations: Bharatiya Janata Party (2008–2024)
- Spouse: Uma Gowda
- Children: Sharath Kumar Bache Gowda

Bendiganahalli Narayangowda Bache Gowda (born 1 October 1942) is an Indian politician who served as the Member of Parliament in the Lok Sabha from Chikkaballapur from 2019 to 2024. He was member of the Bharatiya Janata Party from 2008 to 2024.

B. N. Bache Gowda started his political career with Janata Party and was part of Deve Gowda group, whose Janata Dal (United) he joined in 1999. But he joined BJP later and contested elections as a member of BJP since 2008. He was elected to Karnataka Vidhan Sabha five times - in 1978, 1985, 1994, 1999, 2008 - from Hosakote (Vidhana Sabha constituency). He was the losing candidate in Hosakote in 1989, 2004, 2013. He was a minister in Jagadish Shettar's BJP government in 2013 but lost the assembly election that year from Hosakote. He contested Lok Sabha election from Chikkaballapur as BJP candidate in 2014 but lost. He won that seat in 2019.

His son Sharath Bachegowda (b 1982) contested from Hosakote as BJP candidate in 2018 but lost to Nagaraj of Congress. Nagaraj resigned from Congress in 2019 when Kumaraswamy ministry was toppled. Nagaraj contested the by-poll from Hosakote on BJP's ticket. Sharath Bache Gowda contested as a rebel, and defeated Nagaraj in the by-poll. Later Sharath Bachegowda joined Congress.
