= Chikballapur Assembly constituency =

Legislative Assembly constituency in Karnataka, India

Coordinates: 13.43°N 77.73°E

Chikkaballapur
- Constituency No. 141 for the Karnataka Legislative Assembly
- Map of Assembly constituency

Constituency details
- Country: India
- Region: South India
- State: Karnataka
- District: Chikkaballapur
- Lok Sabha constituency: Chikkaballapur
- Established: 1956
- Total electors: 209,846
- Reservation: None

Member of Legislative Assembly
- 16th Karnataka Legislative Assembly
- Incumbent Pradeep Eshwar
- Party: Indian National Congress
- Elected year: 2023
- Preceded by: K. Sudhakar

Chikballapur Assembly constituency is one of the 224 constituencies in the Karnataka Legislative Assembly of Karnataka, a southern state of India. It is a part of Chikballapur Lok Sabha constituency.

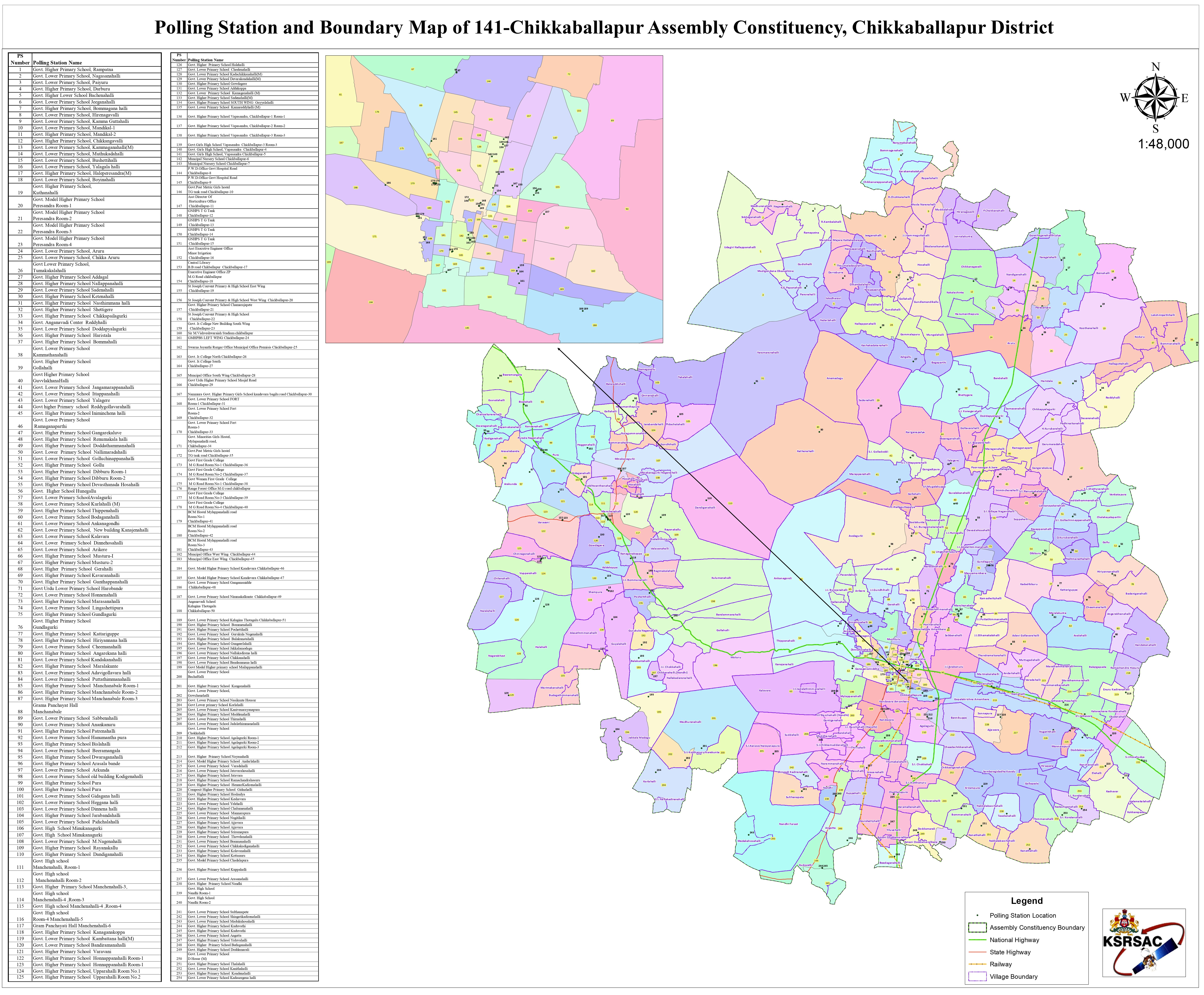
Chikkaballapur Assembly Constituency

== Members of the Legislative Assembly ==
Election	Member	Party
1957	S. Muni Raju	Indian National Congress
1957	A. Muniyappa	Indian National Congress
1962	C. V. Venkatarayappa	Independent politician
1967	K. M. Puttaswamy	Indian National Congress
1972	C. V. Venkatarayappa	Indian National Congress
1978	Renuka Rajendran	Indian National Congress
1983	A. Muniyappa	Independent politician
1985	K. M. Muniyappa	Janata Party
1989	Renuka Rajendran	Indian National Congress
1994	M. Shivananda	Independent politician
1999	K. V. Anasuyamma Natarajan	Indian National Congress
2004	Muniyappa. S. M	Indian National Congress
2008	K. P. Bache Gowda	Janata Dal
2013	Dr. K. Sudhakar	Indian National Congress
2018	Dr. K. Sudhakar	Indian National Congress
2019 By-election	Dr. K. Sudhakar	Bharatiya Janata Party
2023	Pradeep Eshwar	Indian National Congress

== Election results ==
=== Assembly Election 2023 ===
2023 Karnataka Legislative Assembly election : Chikballapur
Party	Candidate	Votes	%	±%
INC	Pradeep Eshwar	86,224	46.65%	▲17.97
BJP	Dr. K. Sudhakar	75,582	40.90%	▼7.91
JD(S)	K. P. Bache Gowda	19,815	10.72%	▼10.03
NOTA	None of the above	1,050	0.57%	▲0.01
Margin of victory		10,642	5.76%	▼14.37
Turnout		185,151	88.23%	▲1.42
Total valid votes		184,817		
Registered electors		209,846		▲4.78
INC gain from BJP		Swing	▼2.16	

=== Assembly By-election 2019 ===
2019 Karnataka Legislative Assembly by-election : Chikballapur
Party	Candidate	Votes	%	±%
BJP	Dr. K. Sudhakar	84,389	48.81%	▲45.60
INC	M. Anjanappa	49,588	28.68%	▼18.59
JD(S)	N. Radhakrishna	35,869	20.75%	▼8.98
BSP	D. R. Narayana Swamy	1,319	0.76%	New
NOTA	None of the above	973	0.56%	▲0.15
Margin of victory		34,801	20.13%	▲2.59
Turnout		173,866	86.81%	▼0.91
Total valid votes		172,902		
Registered electors		200,275		▲1.24
BJP gain from INC		Swing	▲1.54	

=== Assembly Election 2018 ===
2018 Karnataka Legislative Assembly election : Chikballapur
Party	Candidate	Votes	%	±%
INC	Dr. K. Sudhakar	82,006	47.27%	▼1.46
JD(S)	K. P. Bache Gowda	51,575	29.73%	▼9.21
Independent	Naveen Kiran. K. V	29,433	16.97%	New
BJP	Dr. G. V. Manjunatha	5,576	3.21%	▲0.67
Kannada Paksha	N. Narasimhamurthy	1,830	1.05%	New
NOTA	None of the above	714	0.41%	New
Margin of victory		30,431	17.54%	▲7.75
Turnout		173,530	87.72%	▲4.50
Total valid votes		173,467		
Registered electors		197,826		▲12.16
INC hold		Swing	▼1.46	

=== Assembly Election 2013 ===
2013 Karnataka Legislative Assembly election : Chikballapur
Party	Candidate	Votes	%	±%
INC	Dr. K. Sudhakar	74,914	48.73%	▲27.72
JD(S)	K. P. Bache Gowda	59,866	38.94%	▼0.55
BJP	A. V. Byregowda	3,910	2.54%	▼10.79
BSRCP	S. V. Lokesh	1,692	1.10%	New
Independent	Sudhakar. N	1,203	0.78%	New
KJP	Dr. N. Lakshmipathi Babu	1,156	0.75%	New
BSP	M. Somashekar	1,013	0.66%	▼1.53
Margin of victory		15,048	9.79%	▼8.70
Turnout		146,785	83.22%	▲4.37
Total valid votes		153,740		
Registered electors		176,383		▲10.26
INC gain from JD(S)		Swing	▲9.24	

=== Assembly Election 2008 ===
2008 Karnataka Legislative Assembly election : Chikballapur
Party	Candidate	Votes	%	±%
JD(S)	K. P. Bache Gowda	49,774	39.49%	▲7.46
INC	S. V. Ashwathanarayana Reddy	26,473	21.01%	▼20.35
Independent	G. H. Nagaraj	22,041	17.49%	New
BJP	P. S. Prakash	16,797	13.33%	New
BSP	M. M. Basha	2,766	2.19%	▼4.62
Independent	Gummappa	2,152	1.71%	New
Independent	M. Somashekar	1,685	1.34%	New
Independent	V. Nagaraj	1,351	1.07%	New
Independent	V. Venkatesh	1,272	1.01%	New
Margin of victory		23,301	18.49%	▲9.16
Turnout		126,145	78.85%	▲6.86
Total valid votes		126,031		
Registered electors		159,971		▲3.27
JD(S) gain from INC		Swing	▼1.87	

=== Assembly Election 2004 ===
2004 Karnataka Legislative Assembly election : Chikballapur
Party	Candidate	Votes	%	±%
INC	Muniyappa. S. M	45,993	41.36%	▲1.09
JD(S)	M. Shivananda	35,613	32.03%	▲12.34
JD(U)	Nanjundappa Dr.	18,437	16.58%	▼10.09
BSP	Shivanna. N	7,576	6.81%	New
Independent	Munivenkatappa	1,030	0.93%	New
Independent	Lakshmamma. N. V	979	0.88%	New
LJP	Prabhavati. M	933	0.84%	New
Margin of victory		10,380	9.33%	▼4.27
Turnout		111,515	71.99%	▼0.77
Total valid votes		111,195		
Registered electors		154,910		▲7.68
INC hold		Swing	▲1.09	

=== Assembly Election 1999 ===
1999 Karnataka Legislative Assembly election : Chikballapur
Party	Candidate	Votes	%	±%
INC	K. V. Anasuyamma Natarajan	39,460	40.27%	▲19.41
JD(U)	M. Shivananda	26,132	26.67%	New
JD(S)	S. Narayanappa	19,293	19.69%	New
Independent	K. C. Rajakanth	8,679	8.86%	New
Independent	M. Gangadharaiah	3,453	3.52%	New
Independent	K. N. Vasanth Kumar	960	0.98%	New
Margin of victory		13,328	13.60%	▼6.05
Turnout		104,672	72.76%	▼2.04
Total valid votes		97,977		
Rejected ballots		6,450	6.16%	▲4.04
Registered electors		143,863		▲9.07
INC gain from Independent		Swing	▼0.66	

=== Assembly Election 1994 ===
1994 Karnataka Legislative Assembly election : Chikballapur
Party	Candidate	Votes	%	±%
Independent	M. Shivananda	39,520	40.93%	New
JD	K. M. Muniyappa	20,544	21.28%	▲9.29
INC	G. Narayanamma	20,146	20.86%	▼27.74
BJP	Dr. Chennappa	7,782	8.06%	▲6.27
Independent	Renuka Rajendran	3,731	3.86%	New
Independent	K. N. Vasanth Kumar	1,264	1.31%	New
INC	R. K. Thyagaraj	1,191	1.23%	New
Independent	S. Nagamani	1,149	1.19%	New
Margin of victory		18,976	19.65%	▲2.24
Turnout		98,659	74.80%	▲3.56
Total valid votes		96,556		
Rejected ballots		2,087	2.12%	▼3.79
Registered electors		131,902		▲7.53
Independent gain from INC		Swing	▼7.67	

=== Assembly Election 1989 ===
1989 Karnataka Legislative Assembly election : Chikballapur
Party	Candidate	Votes	%	±%
INC	Renuka Rajendran	39,958	48.60%	▲8.28
JP	K. M. Muniyappa	25,646	31.19%	New
JD	V. Narasimhaiah	9,857	11.99%	New
Independent	A. Muniyappa	1,929	2.35%	New
BJP	N. Srinivasalu	1,472	1.79%	New
Independent	D. N. Narasappa	1,072	1.30%	New
Independent	R. K. Thyagaraj	972	1.18%	New
Independent	T. Thirumaliya	632	0.77%	New
Margin of victory		14,312	17.41%	▼0.64
Turnout		87,389	71.24%	▲1.78
Total valid votes		82,224		
Rejected ballots		5,165	5.91%	▲4.25
Registered electors		122,665		▲24.71
INC gain from JP		Swing	▼9.77	

=== Assembly Election 1985 ===
1985 Karnataka Legislative Assembly election : Chikballapur
Party	Candidate	Votes	%	±%
JP	K. M. Muniyappa	39,216	58.37%	New
INC	K. N. Nagappa	27,091	40.32%	▲6.14
Independent	A. Venkataramaiah	470	0.70%	New
Independent	M. Prabhabathi	406	0.60%	New
Margin of victory		12,125	18.05%	▼11.59
Turnout		68,317	69.46%	▼1.52
Total valid votes		67,183		
Rejected ballots		1,134	1.66%	▼0.73
Registered electors		98,358		▲6.72
JP gain from Independent		Swing	▼5.45	

=== Assembly Election 1983 ===
1983 Karnataka Legislative Assembly election : Chikballapur
Party	Candidate	Votes	%	±%
Independent	A. Muniyappa	40,751	63.82%	New
INC	Renuka Rajendran	21,823	34.18%	▲29.32
Independent	M. V. Muniyappa	461	0.72%	New
Margin of victory		18,928	29.64%	▲11.84
Turnout		65,413	70.98%	▲0.03
Total valid votes		63,850		
Rejected ballots		1,563	2.39%	▼0.23
Registered electors		92,163		▲9.32
Independent gain from INC(I)		Swing	▲8.24	

=== Assembly Election 1978 ===
1978 Karnataka Legislative Assembly election : Chikballapur
Party	Candidate	Votes	%	±%
INC(I)	Renuka Rajendran	32,378	55.58%	New
JP	A. Muniyappa	22,008	37.78%	New
INC	K. M. Muniyappa	2,830	4.86%	▼50.97
Independent	Muniswamyn	787	1.35%	New
Margin of victory		10,370	17.80%	▲3.60
Turnout		59,816	70.95%	▲2.86
Total valid votes		58,251		
Rejected ballots		1,565	2.62%	▲2.62
Registered electors		84,309		▲12.34
INC(I) gain from INC		Swing	▼0.25	

=== Assembly Election 1972 ===
1972 Mysore State Legislative Assembly election : Chikballapur
Party	Candidate	Votes	%	±%
INC	C. V. Venkatarayappa	27,804	55.83%	▲12.96
Independent	R. B. Pillappa	20,733	41.63%	New
ABJS	T. M. Ramarao	1,261	2.53%	New
Margin of victory		7,071	14.20%	▲5.48
Turnout		51,103	68.09%	▲4.37
Total valid votes		49,798		
Registered electors		75,048		▲18.59
INC hold		Swing	▲12.96	

=== Assembly Election 1967 ===
1967 Mysore State Legislative Assembly election : Chikballapur
Party	Candidate	Votes	%	±%
INC	K. M. Puttaswamy	16,302	42.87%	▲6.47
Independent	K. Venkatakrishnappa	12,984	34.14%	New
Independent	A. B. Krishnappa	7,001	18.41%	New
Independent	G. Muniyappa	1,743	4.58%	New
Margin of victory		3,318	8.72%	▼18.47
Turnout		40,326	63.72%	▼0.63
Total valid votes		38,030		
Registered electors		63,282		▲4.42
INC gain from Independent		Swing	▼20.73	

=== Assembly Election 1962 ===
1962 Mysore State Legislative Assembly election : Chikballapur
Party	Candidate	Votes	%	±%
Independent	C. V. Venkatarayappa	23,362	63.60%	New
INC	T. S. Venkataramanaiah	13,373	36.40%	▼14.73
Margin of victory		9,989	27.19%	▲26.07
Turnout		38,997	64.35%	▲13.34
Total valid votes		36,735		
Registered electors		60,601		▼42.31
Independent gain from INC		Swing	▲36.40	

=== Assembly Election 1957 ===
1957 Mysore State Legislative Assembly election : Chikballapur
Party	Candidate	Votes	%	±%
INC	S. Muni Raju	29,149	27.20%	New
Independent	C. V. Venkatarayappa	27,947	26.07%	New
INC	A. Muniyappa	25,652	23.93%	New
Independent	Bandi Muniyappa	24,436	22.80%	New
Margin of victory		1,202	1.12%	
Turnout		107,184	51.01%	
Total valid votes		107,184		
Registered electors		105,055		
INC win (new seat)				

== See also ==
- List of constituencies of Karnataka Legislative Assembly
