= S. N. Prasan Kumar =

Indian politician

Member of Parliament India
- In office 1980–1984

Personal details
- Born: 3 June 1935 (age 91) Madhugiri, Tumukuru District, Karnataka. India
- Party: Indian National Congress
- Occupation: Politician

S. N. Prasan Kumar is a former member of Parliament from Karnataka, India. He was born on 3 June 1935 to Sri N Ramaiah Setty and Smt. Varalakshmi in Madhugiri, Tumukuru District, Karnataka.

== Personal life ==
At an early age, he lost his mother and was later adopted by his maternal grandfather by whom he was raised. His maternal grandfather Nanjaiah Setty was an MRA (Mysore Representative Assembly) member for 22 years prior to independence and served in the Municipal Council for 14 years. He was brought up in a political family as well as having ownership of multiple businesses.

== Education ==
Kumar pursued his studies in the field of commerce at St. Joseph's College in Bangalore, Karnataka.

== Political career ==
His political career began when he was just 20 years as a secretary for the Madhugiri Taluk Congress Committee. In 1960 he was elected as a Madhugiri town councillor. After 2 years he was elected as the president of the Town Council Municipal in Madhugiri which continued for 17 years.

== Chikkaballapur Parliamentary Constituency ==
In the year 1980 he contested for elections from Congress in Chikkaballapur Parliamentary Constituency. He won the elections by defeating M. V. Krishnappa who was a central minister at the time. Kumar served for a single term in the Lok Sabha and later retired from politics.

His legacy still remains as the first member of Parliament from the Arya Vysya community from Karnataka, India.
