= Pradeep Eshwar =

Indian politician

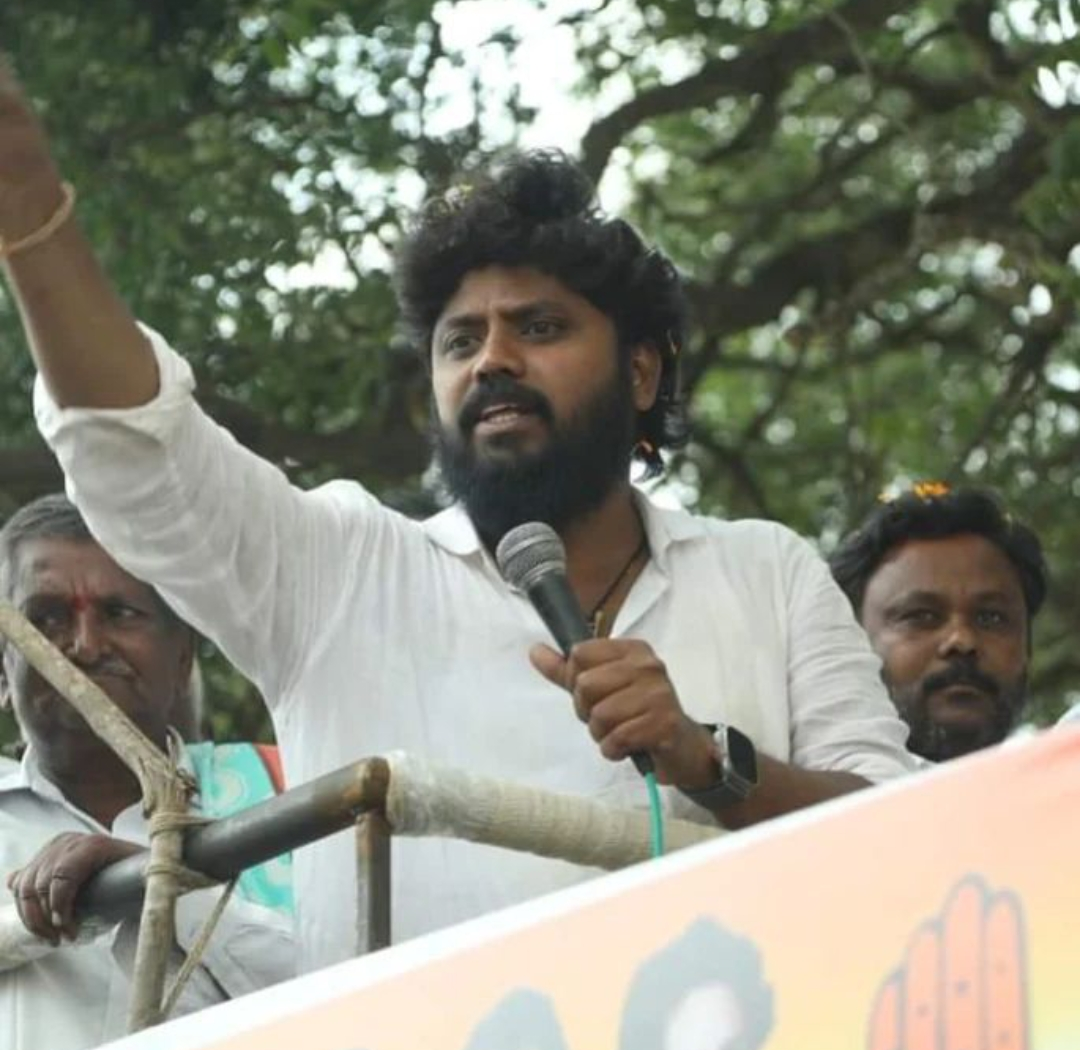
- Pradeep Eshwar during 2023 Karnataka Legislative Assembly Election Campaign in Chikballapur

Member of Karnataka Legislative Assembly
- Incumbent
- Assumed office 2023
- Preceded by: K. Sudhakar (politician)
- Constituency: Chikballapur

Personal details
- Born: Peresandra, Chikkaballapura, Karnataka
- Party: Indian National Congress
- Spouse: Nayana M
- Children: one
- Education: 12th Failed,

Pradeep Eshwar is an Indian politician who is a Member of the Karnataka Legislative Assembly as a member of the Indian National Congress, representing the Chikballapur Assembly constituency.

He is the founder and MD of Parishrama NEET Academy.
