= N. Shreenivasaiah =

Indian politician (born 1987)

N. Shreenivasaiah (born 1987) is an Indian politician from Karnataka. He is a member of the Karnataka Legislative Assembly from Nelamangala Assembly constituency which is reserved for SC community in Bangalore Rural district. He represents Indian National Congress and won the 2023 Karnataka Legislative Assembly election.

== Early life and education ==
Shreenivasaiah is from Yeshwanthapur, Bengaluru. His father is Nagarajaiah. He completed his Master of Arts in 2009 from Bangalore University. He later did his Post Graduation Diploma in Ambedkar Studies, also at Bangalore University.

== Career ==
Shreenivasaiah won from Nelamangala Assembly constituency representing Indian National Congress in the 2023 Karnataka Legislative Assembly election. He polled 84,229 votes and defeated his nearest rival, K. Srinivasamurthy of Janata Dal (Secular) by a margin of 31,978 votes.
