= Hosakote Assembly constituency =

Legislative Assembly constituency in Karnataka, India

Coordinates: 13.07°N 77.79°E

Hosakote
- Constituency No. 178 for the Karnataka Legislative Assembly
- Map of Assembly constituency

Constituency details
- Country: India
- Region: South India
- State: Karnataka
- District: Bangalore Rural
- Lok Sabha constituency: Chikkaballapur
- Established: 1956
- Total electors: 234,098
- Reservation: None

Member of Legislative Assembly
- 16th Karnataka Legislative Assembly
- Incumbent Sharath Kumar Bache Gowda
- Party: Indian National Congress
- Elected year: 2023
- Preceded by: M. T. B. Nagaraj

Hosakote Assembly constituency (also spelled Hosakote) is one of the seats in Karnataka State Assembly in India. It is part of Chikballapur Lok Sabha constituency.

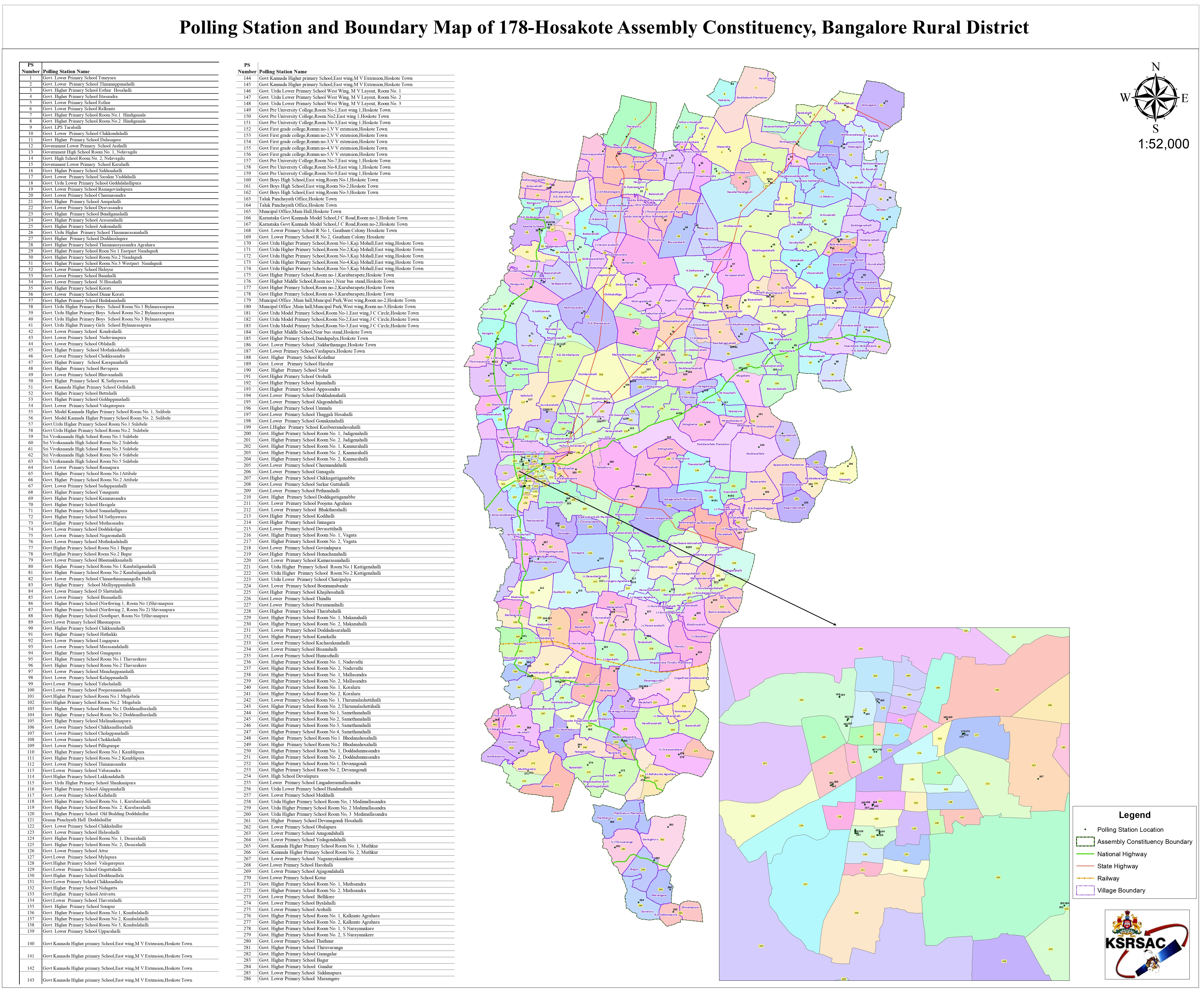
Hoskote Assembly Constituency

== Members of the Legislative Assembly ==
Year	Member	Political party
1957	S. R. Ramaiah	Indian National Congress
1957	Rukmaniamma	Indian National Congress
1962	B. Chanabyre Gowda	Swatantra Party
1967	N. Chikke Gowda	Indian National Congress
1972	N. Chikke Gowda	Indian National Congress
1978	B. N. Bache Gowda	Janata Party
1983	N. Chikke Gowda	Indian National Congress
1985	B. N. Bache Gowda	Janata Party
1989	N. Chikke Gowda	Indian National Congress
1994	B. N. Bache Gowda	Janata Dal
1999	B. N. Bache Gowda	Janata Dal (United)
2004	M. T. B. Nagaraj	Indian National Congress
2008	B. N. Bache Gowda	Bharatiya Janata Party
2013	M. T. B. Nagaraj (Note: Disqualified by the Hon'ble Speaker under the 10th Schedule of the Constitution with effect from 25/07/2019)	Indian National Congress
2018	M. T. B. Nagaraj	Indian National Congress
2019 (Note: By-Election)	Sharath Kumar Bache Gowda	Independent politician
2023	Sharath Kumar Bache Gowda	Indian National Congress

== Election results ==
=== Assembly Election 2023 ===
2023 Karnataka Legislative Assembly election : Hosakote
Party	Candidate	Votes	%	±%
INC	Sharath Kumar Bache Gowda	107,220	50.13%	▲29.02
BJP	N. Nagaraju	102,145	47.75%	▲12.01
Independent	G. Narayanaswamy	1,425	0.67%	New
NOTA	None of the above	507	0.24%	▼0.15
Margin of victory		5,075	2.37%	▼3.48
Turnout		214,042	91.43%	▲0.49
Total valid votes		213,896		
Registered electors		234,098		▲8.01
INC gain from Independent		Swing	▲8.54	

=== Assembly By-election 2019 ===
2019 Karnataka Legislative Assembly by-election : Hosakote
Party	Candidate	Votes	%	±%
Independent	Sharath Kumar Bache Gowda	81,671	41.59%	New
BJP	M. T. B. Nagaraj	70,185	35.74%	▼11.51
INC	Padmavathi Suresh	41,443	21.11%	▼30.08
NOTA	None of the above	757	0.39%	▲0.11
Margin of victory		11,486	5.85%	▲1.92
Turnout		197,104	90.94%	▲0.61
Total valid votes		196,353		
Registered electors		216,741		▲1.40
Independent gain from INC		Swing	▼9.60	

=== Assembly Election 2018 ===
2018 Karnataka Legislative Assembly election : Hosakote
Party	Candidate	Votes	%	±%
INC	M. T. B. Nagaraj	98,824	51.19%	▼4.32
BJP	Sharath Kumar Bache Gowda	91,227	47.25%	▼3.61
NOTA	None of the above	539	0.28%	New
Margin of victory		7,597	3.93%	▼0.72
Turnout		193,079	90.33%	▼0.66
Total valid votes		193,071		
Registered electors		213,750		▲16.86
INC hold		Swing	▼4.32	

=== Assembly Election 2013 ===
2013 Karnataka Legislative Assembly election : Hosakote
Party	Candidate	Votes	%	±%
INC	M. T. B. Nagaraj	85,238	55.51%	▲8.18
BJP	B. N. Bache Gowda	78,099	50.86%	▲0.79
JD(S)	V. Sridhar	1,304	0.85%	▼0.10
Margin of victory		7,139	4.65%	▲1.92
Turnout		166,428	90.99%	▲1.61
Total valid votes		153,547		
Registered electors		182,911		▲15.14
INC gain from BJP		Swing	▲5.44	

=== Assembly Election 2008 ===
2008 Karnataka Legislative Assembly election : Hosakote
Party	Candidate	Votes	%	±%
BJP	B. N. Bache Gowda	71,069	50.07%	▲43.19
INC	M. T. B. Nagaraj	67,191	47.33%	▲1.81
JD(S)	N. Kumar	1,343	0.95%	▼44.07
BSP	S. R. Ranganatha	946	0.67%	New
Margin of victory		3,878	2.73%	▲2.23
Turnout		141,987	89.38%	▲15.87
Total valid votes		141,953		
Registered electors		158,865		▼29.88
BJP gain from INC		Swing	▲4.55	

=== Assembly Election 2004 ===
2004 Karnataka Legislative Assembly election : Hosakote
Party	Candidate	Votes	%	±%
INC	M. T. B. Nagaraj	75,808	45.52%	▲2.23
JD(S)	B. N. Bache Gowda	74,973	45.02%	▲41.35
BJP	Lakshmana. K	11,464	6.88%	New
Independent	Bachegowda. A. N	2,468	1.48%	New
Margin of victory		835	0.50%	▼4.31
Turnout		166,549	73.51%	▼5.20
Total valid votes		166,529		
Registered electors		226,567		▲17.32
INC gain from JD(U)		Swing	▼2.58	

=== Assembly Election 1999 ===
1999 Karnataka Legislative Assembly election : Hosakote
Party	Candidate	Votes	%	±%
JD(U)	B. N. Bache Gowda	73,055	48.10%	New
INC	Mune Gowda	65,752	43.29%	▲7.51
Independent	H. J. Bachegowda	5,584	3.68%	New
JD(S)	N. S. Chandramohan	5,581	3.67%	New
Independent	Mune Gowda	1,903	1.25%	New
Margin of victory		7,303	4.81%	▼12.56
Turnout		151,992	78.71%	▼0.76
Total valid votes		151,875		
Rejected ballots		9	0.01%	▼1.46
Registered electors		193,113		▲13.92
JD(U) gain from JD		Swing	▼5.06	

=== Assembly Election 1994 ===
1994 Karnataka Legislative Assembly election : Hosakote
Party	Candidate	Votes	%	±%
JD	B. N. Bache Gowda	70,517	53.16%	▲13.52
INC	Mune Gowda	47,467	35.78%	▼15.17
BJP	A. M. Rajanna	8,796	6.63%	New
INC	K. Nanjegowda	5,087	3.83%	New
Margin of victory		23,050	17.37%	▲6.06
Turnout		134,714	79.47%	▲1.01
Total valid votes		132,662		
Rejected ballots		1,979	1.47%	▼2.12
Registered electors		169,510		▲14.59
JD gain from INC		Swing	▲2.21	

=== Assembly Election 1989 ===
1989 Karnataka Legislative Assembly election : Hosakote
Party	Candidate	Votes	%	±%
INC	N. Chikke Gowda	57,007	50.95%	▲6.60
JD	B. N. Bache Gowda	44,352	39.64%	New
JP	B. M. Narayanaswamy	9,699	8.67%	New
Margin of victory		12,655	11.31%	▲6.55
Turnout		116,067	78.46%	▼1.31
Total valid votes		111,899		
Rejected ballots		4,168	3.59%	▲2.10
Registered electors		147,932		▲25.34
INC gain from JP		Swing	▲1.83	

=== Assembly Election 1985 ===
1985 Karnataka Legislative Assembly election : Hosakote
Party	Candidate	Votes	%	±%
JP	B. N. Bache Gowda	45,552	49.12%	▲14.08
INC	N. Chikke Gowda	41,133	44.35%	▼16.74
Independent	Bache Gowda	1,497	1.61%	New
Independent	S. Abdul Rasheed	1,278	1.38%	New
Independent	B. K. Ramaiah	1,252	1.35%	New
Margin of victory		4,419	4.76%	▼21.30
Turnout		94,141	79.77%	▲1.62
Total valid votes		92,739		
Rejected ballots		1,402	1.49%	▼0.42
Registered electors		118,020		▲15.58
JP gain from INC		Swing	▼11.97	

=== Assembly Election 1983 ===
1983 Karnataka Legislative Assembly election : Hosakote
Party	Candidate	Votes	%	±%
INC	N. Chikke Gowda	47,822	61.09%	▲33.20
JP	S. N. Thabasappa	27,425	35.04%	▼12.42
INC(J)	M. Nanjappa	1,564	2.00%	New
Independent	Jamshed Khan	1,465	1.87%	New
Margin of victory		20,397	26.06%	▲6.49
Turnout		79,799	78.15%	▼4.65
Total valid votes		78,276		
Rejected ballots		1,523	1.91%	▼0.02
Registered electors		102,112		▲11.22
INC gain from JP		Swing	▲13.63	

=== Assembly Election 1978 ===
1978 Karnataka Legislative Assembly election : Hosakote
Party	Candidate	Votes	%	±%
JP	B. N. Bache Gowda	35,387	47.46%	New
INC	Mune Gowda	20,795	27.89%	▼52.33
INC(I)	M. Somasekhara	17,050	22.87%	New
Independent	Allappa	879	1.18%	New
Independent	J. L. Souza	448	0.60%	New
Margin of victory		14,592	19.57%	▼46.82
Turnout		76,025	82.80%	▲14.27
Total valid votes		74,559		
Rejected ballots		1,466	1.93%	▲1.93
Registered electors		91,814		▲23.06
JP gain from INC		Swing	▼32.76	

=== Assembly Election 1972 ===
1972 Mysore State Legislative Assembly election : Hosakote
Party	Candidate	Votes	%	±%
INC	N. Chikke Gowda	40,227	80.22%	▲13.59
INC(O)	T. Kembarai	6,937	13.83%	New
SSP	S. N. Thabasappa	2,351	4.69%	New
ABJS	K. S. Rama Rao	401	0.80%	New
Margin of victory		33,290	66.39%	▲28.87
Turnout		51,134	68.53%	▼9.53
Total valid votes		50,146		
Registered electors		74,612		▲21.10
INC hold		Swing	▲13.59	

=== Assembly Election 1967 ===
1967 Mysore State Legislative Assembly election : Hosakote
Party	Candidate	Votes	%	±%
INC	N. Chikke Gowda	30,530	66.63%	▲22.95
SWA	B. Chanabyre Gowda	13,337	29.11%	▼27.21
Independent	B. Ramappa	1,146	2.50%	New
Independent	B. M. V. Gowda	661	1.44%	New
Margin of victory		17,193	37.52%	▲24.89
Turnout		48,097	78.06%	▲8.52
Total valid votes		45,821		
Registered electors		61,614		▲13.86
INC gain from SWA		Swing	▲10.31	

=== Assembly Election 1962 ===
1962 Mysore State Legislative Assembly election : Hosakote
Party	Candidate	Votes	%	±%
SWA	B. Chanabyre Gowda	20,643	56.32%	New
INC	N. Chikke Gowda	16,012	43.68%	▼11.46
Margin of victory		4,631	12.63%	▲6.46
Turnout		37,632	69.54%	▲16.80
Total valid votes		36,655		
Registered electors		54,116		▼40.89
SWA gain from INC		Swing	▲26.19	

=== Assembly Election 1957 ===
1957 Mysore State Legislative Assembly election : Hosakote
Party	Candidate	Votes	%	±%
INC	S. R. Ramaiah	29,100	30.13%	New
INC	Rukmaniamma	24,149	25.01%	New
PSP	H. V. Nanjiah	23,143	23.96%	New
PSP	B. Chanabyre Gowda	20,181	20.90%	New
Margin of victory		5,957	6.17%	
Turnout		96,573	52.74%	
Total valid votes		96,573		
Registered electors		91,559		
INC win (new seat)				

== See also ==
- List of constituencies of Karnataka Legislative Assembly
