= Hulkuru =

Hulkuru Guttahalli Bangaru Tirupati
- village
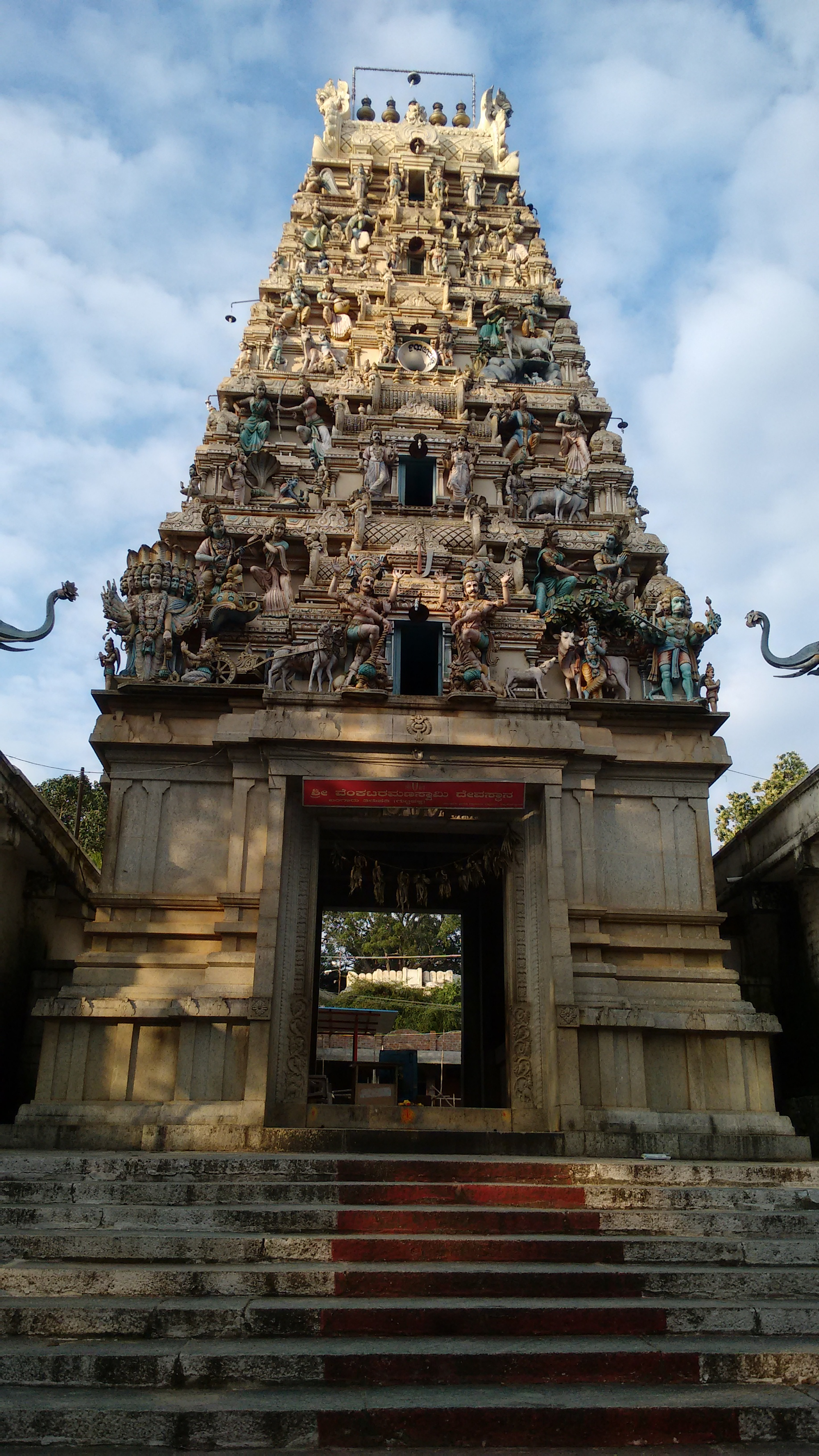
- Gopuram, Sri Lakshmi Venkateshwara Swamy Temple, Bangaru Tirupathi

- Location in Karnataka, India Hulkuru (India)
- Coordinates: 13.030193647636837°N 78.35489415680044°E
- Country: India
- State: Karnataka
- District: Kolar
- Taluk: Kolar Gold Fields

Government
  - Type: Panchayati raj (India)
  - Body: Gram panchayat

Population
  - Total: 536

Languages
  - Official: Kannada
- Time zone: UTC+5:30 (IST)
- PIN: 563 116
- Telephone code: 08153
- ISO 3166 code: IN-KA
- Vehicle registration: KA
- 2011 census code: 622720
- Website: karnataka.gov.in

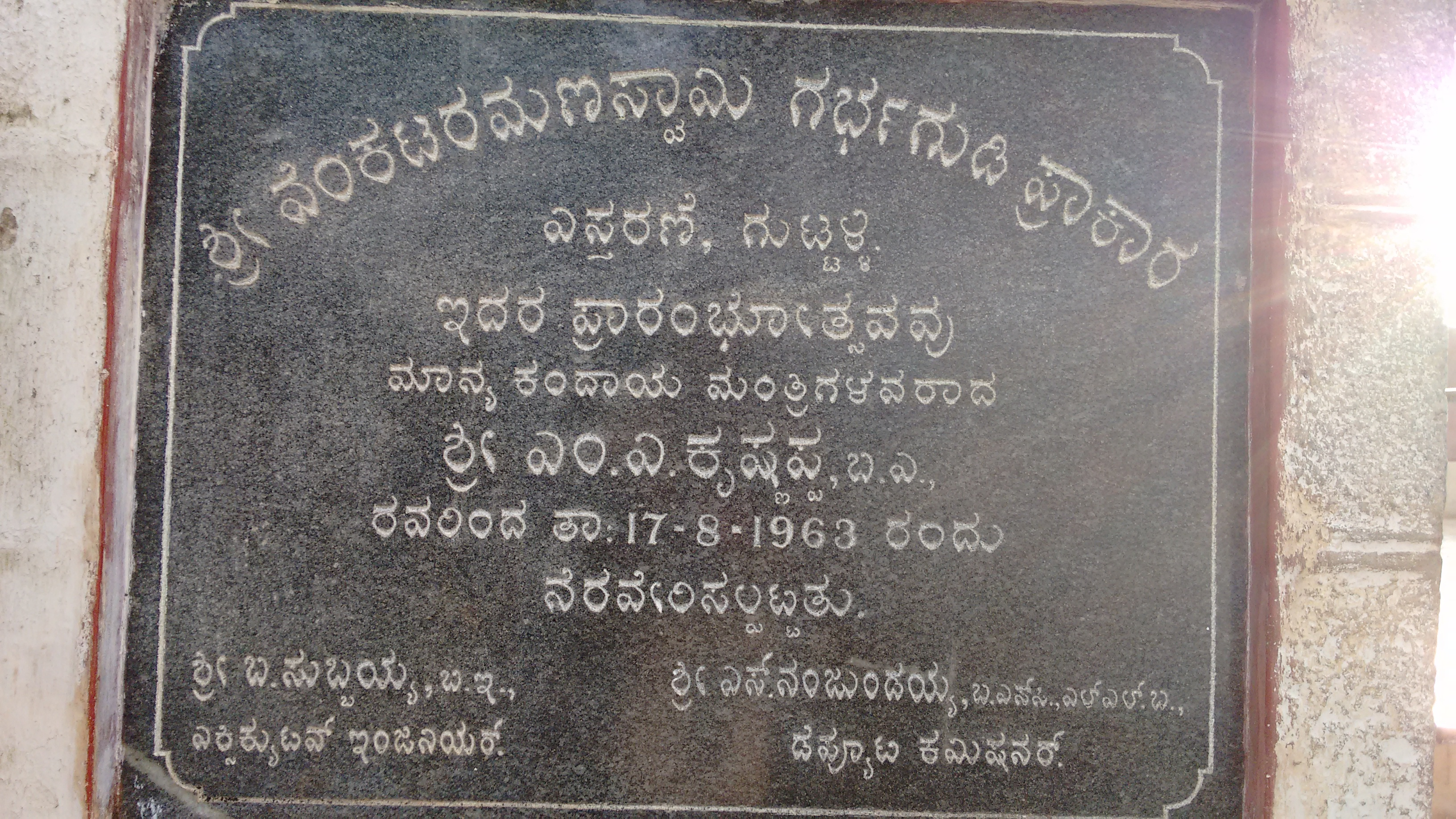
Renovation and expansion at Sri Lakshmi Venkateshwara Swamy Temple, Bangaru Tirupathi, Hulkuru (Guttahalli)

Hulkuru or Guttahalli is a small village in the Kolar Gold Fields Taluk of Kolar district in Karnataka, India. It is situated about 15 kilometers from Kolar Gold Fields.

Hulkuru is famous for the Lakshmi Venkateshwara temple. This place is also called as Bangaru Tirupati. The western part of Venkatapura became Guttahalli. Bangaru Tirupati was modeled after the famous Venkateshwara Temple of Tirupati in Andhra Pradesh.

== Education ==
Government First Grade College was started on 23-Jul-2007 as per the orders of honorable Government of Karnataka. During its first year, it made its humble beginning in ‘Gandhi Seva Grama’ building with 31 students and two programmes, namely BA (HES) & BBM. Five years later, its strength increased moderately to 328 students with two additional programmes, namely BA (HEP) and B.COM.

Bangaru Thirupathi, which is popularly known as Guttahalli, is located in Hulkuru village, Kolar district. It is 100 KM away from state capital, Bengaluru. It is a holy pilgrimage with Lord Venkateshwara shrine, which attracts thousands of people during the holy Shravanamasa and during its Jathra festival. It is a place known for its tranquility and is free from all urban disturbances, providing a natural environment for the students to learn.

GFGC Bangaru Thirupathi is affiliated to Bangalore North University and presently it is offering Arts, Commerce and Management Programs. Classes are being conducted in two different buildings for short of accommodation. For the construction of new building revenue department has sanctioned 3 acres of land to the college and on which five temporary class rooms are being constructed from grants given by Dept. of collegiate Education. Another 2 crore rupees grants are being sanctioned by the government of Karnataka for the construction of a permanent structure.

Despite the rural background and economic deprivation, the students perform well academically. They have participated in district and inter-collegiate tournaments. The college also conducts several indoor and outdoor games and the victorious are rewarded with suitable prizes. During 2011-12, the students participated in an inter-collegiate cultural competition held in different places and won medals for their performance.

The library has a collection of books with different titles to cater to the needs of both students and staff. Leading dailies and journals are displayed in the reading room for the benefit of students and staff.

== Demographics ==
According to the 2011 Indian Census, the town consists of 536 people. The town has a literacy rate of 62.12% which is lower than Karnataka's average of 75.36%.

Total Number of Household : 119
Population	Persons	Males	Females
Total	536	250	286
In the age group 0–6 years	50	29	21
Scheduled Castes (SC)	320	139	181
Scheduled Tribes (ST)	3	1	2
Literates	333	178	155
Illiterate	203	72	131
Total Worker	237	147	90
Main Worker	228	144	84
Main Worker - Cultivator	49	34	15
Main Worker - Agricultural Labourers	71	29	42
Main Worker - Household Industries	3	2	1
Main Worker - Other	105	79	26
Marginal Worker	9	3	6
Marginal Worker - Cultivator	1	0	1
Marginal Worker - Agriculture Labourers	6	2	4
Marginal Worker - Household Industries	0	0	0
Marginal Workers - Other	2	1	1
Marginal Worker (3-6 Months)	9	3	6
Marginal Worker - Cultivator (3-6 Months)	1	0	1
Marginal Worker - Agriculture Labourers (3-6 Months)	6	2	4
Marginal Worker - Household Industries (3-6 Months)	0	0	0
Marginal Worker - Other (3-6 Months)	2	1	1
Marginal Worker (0-3 Months)	0	0	0
Marginal Worker - Cultivator (0-3 Months)	0	0	0
Marginal Worker - Agriculture Labourers (0-3 Months)	0	0	0
Marginal Worker - Household Industries (0-3 Months)	0	0	0
Marginal Worker - Other Workers (0-3 Months)	0	0	0
Non Worker	299	103	196

== Gallery ==
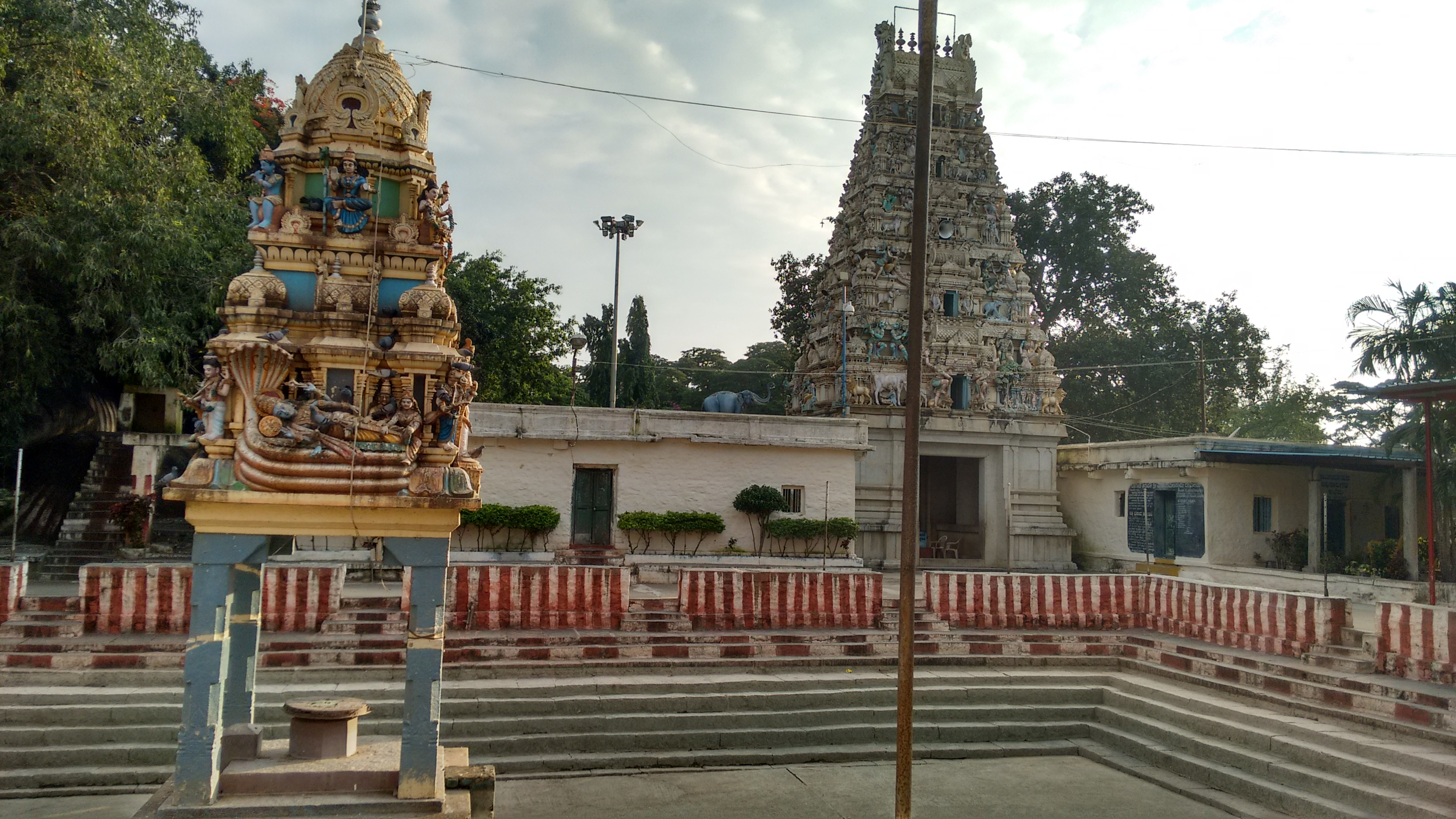

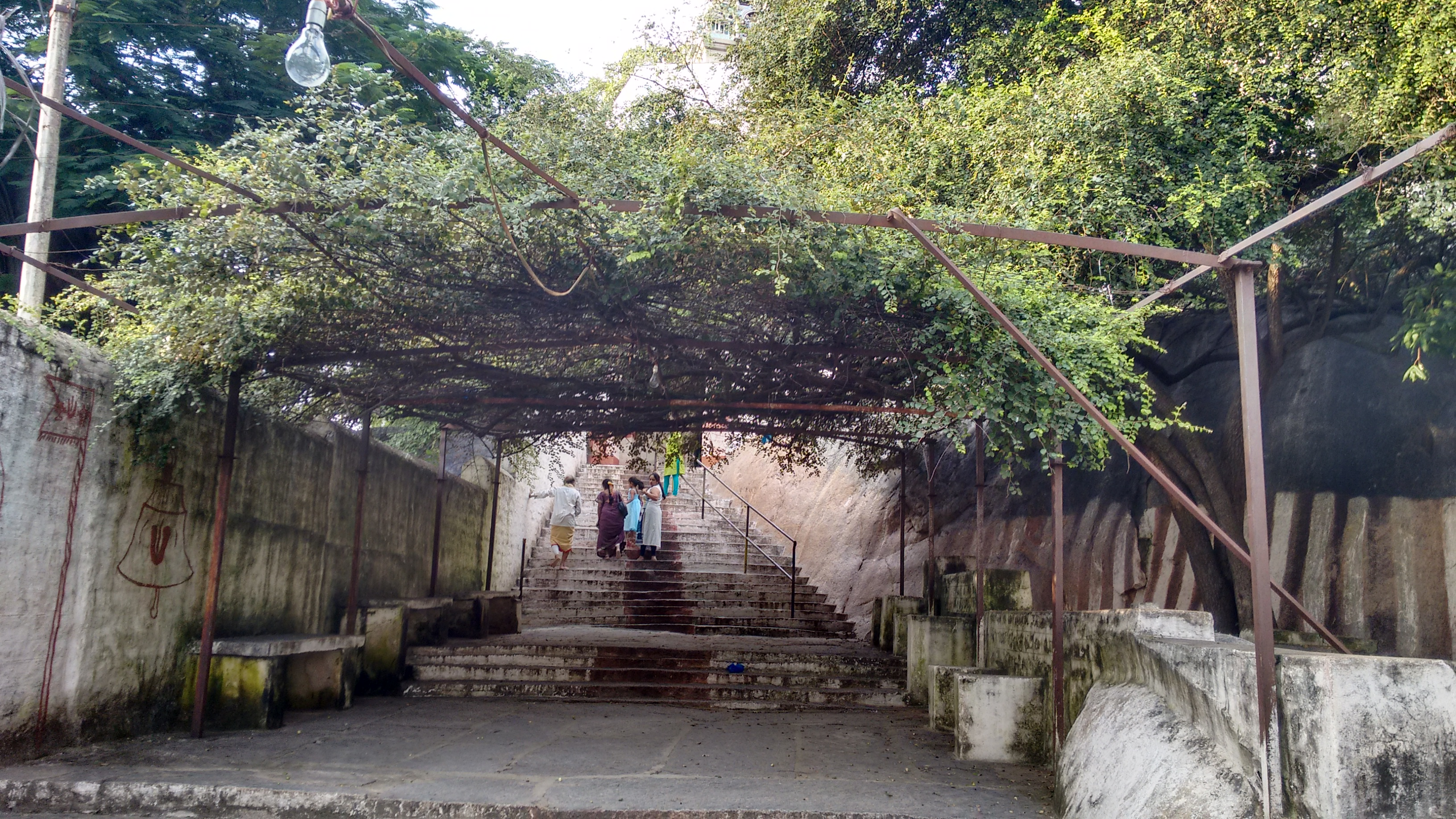

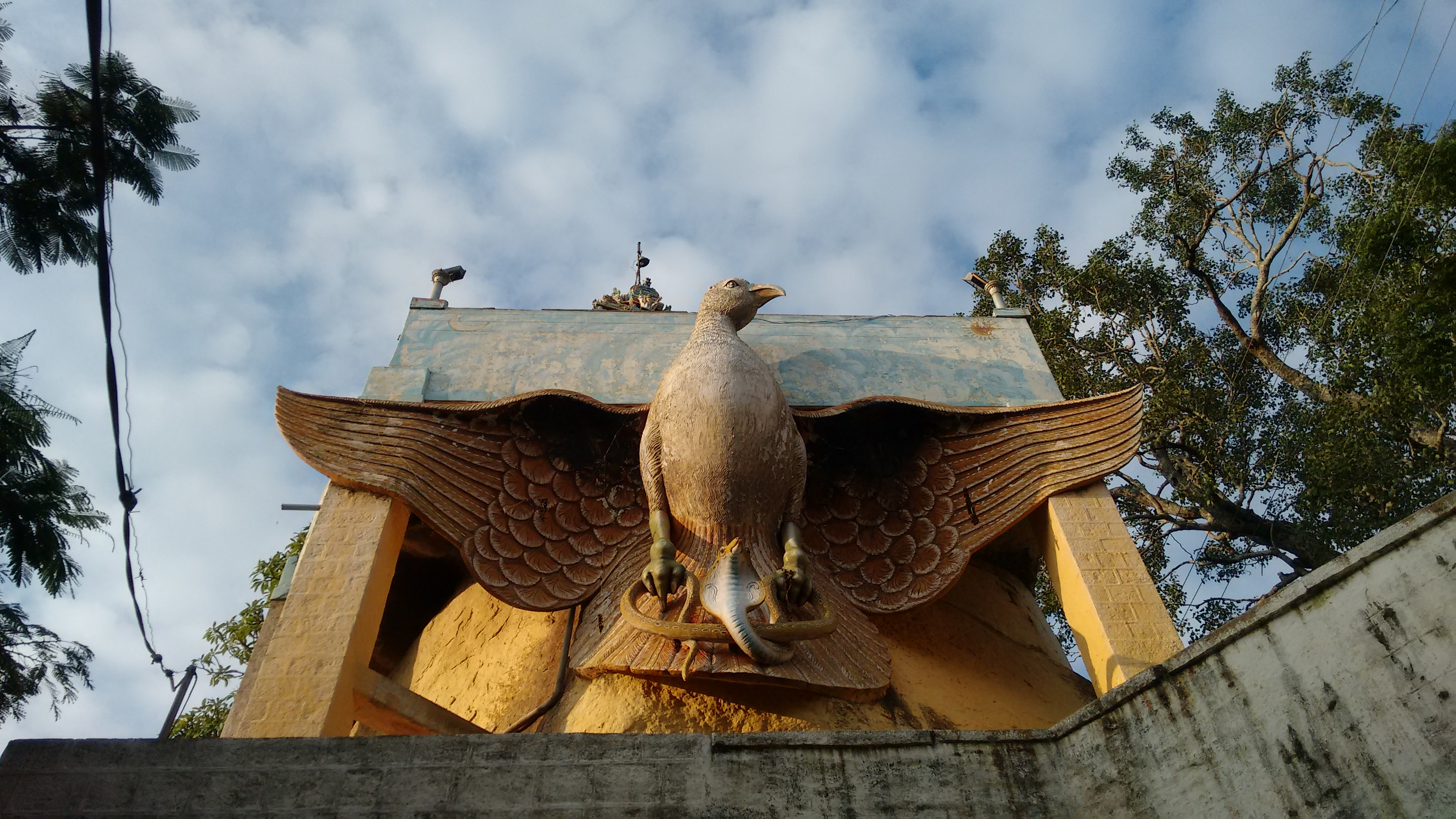

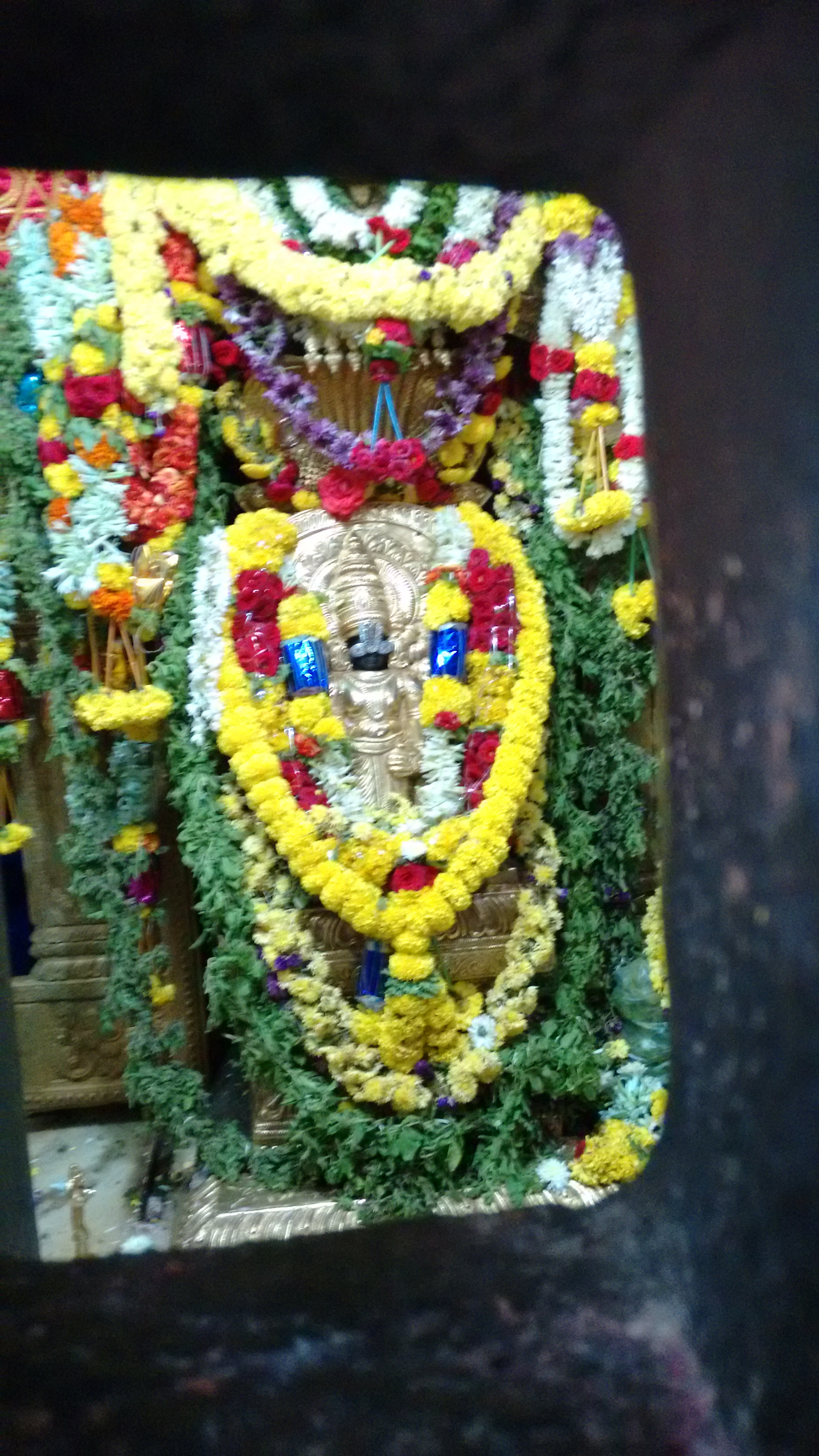

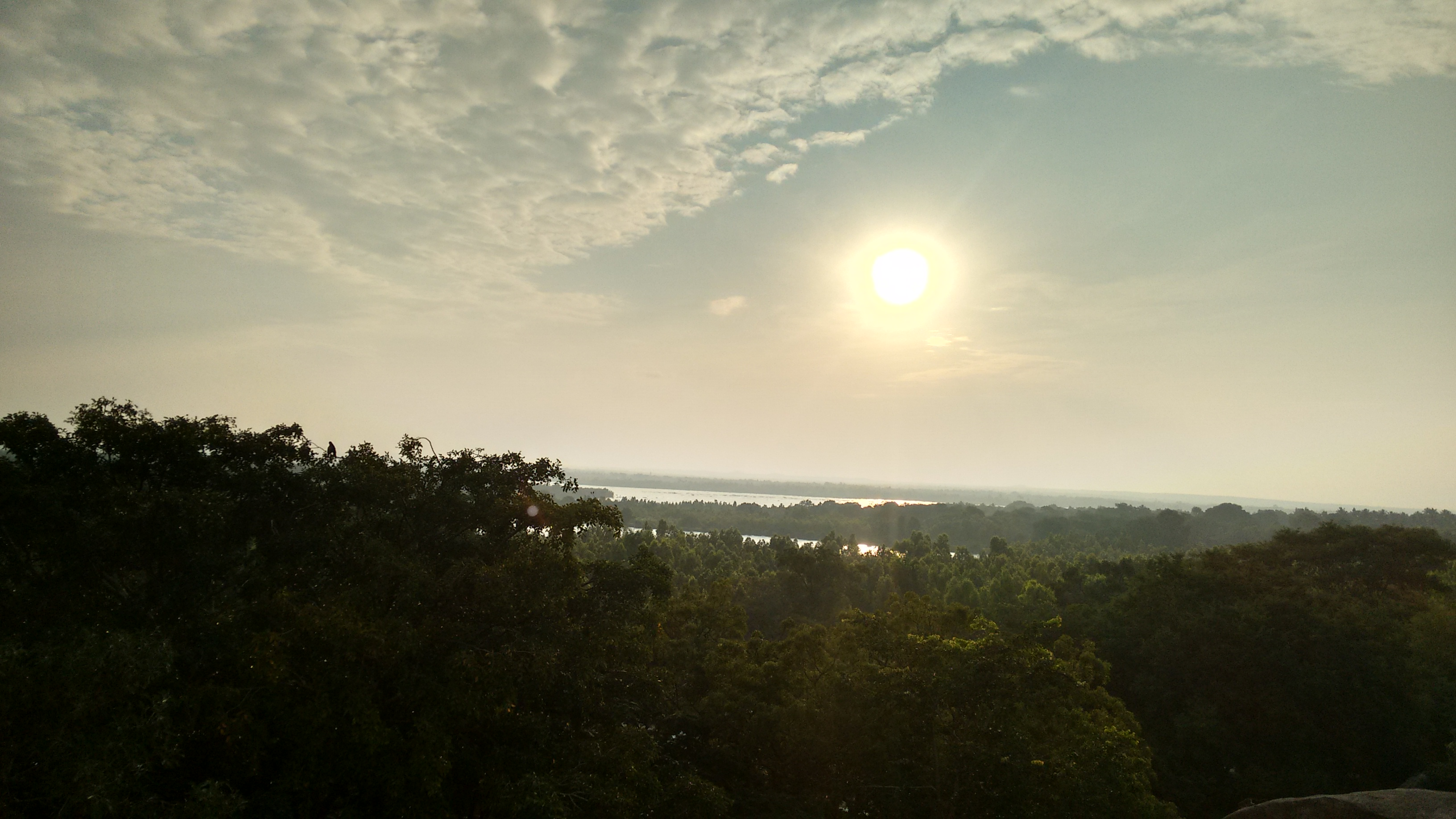

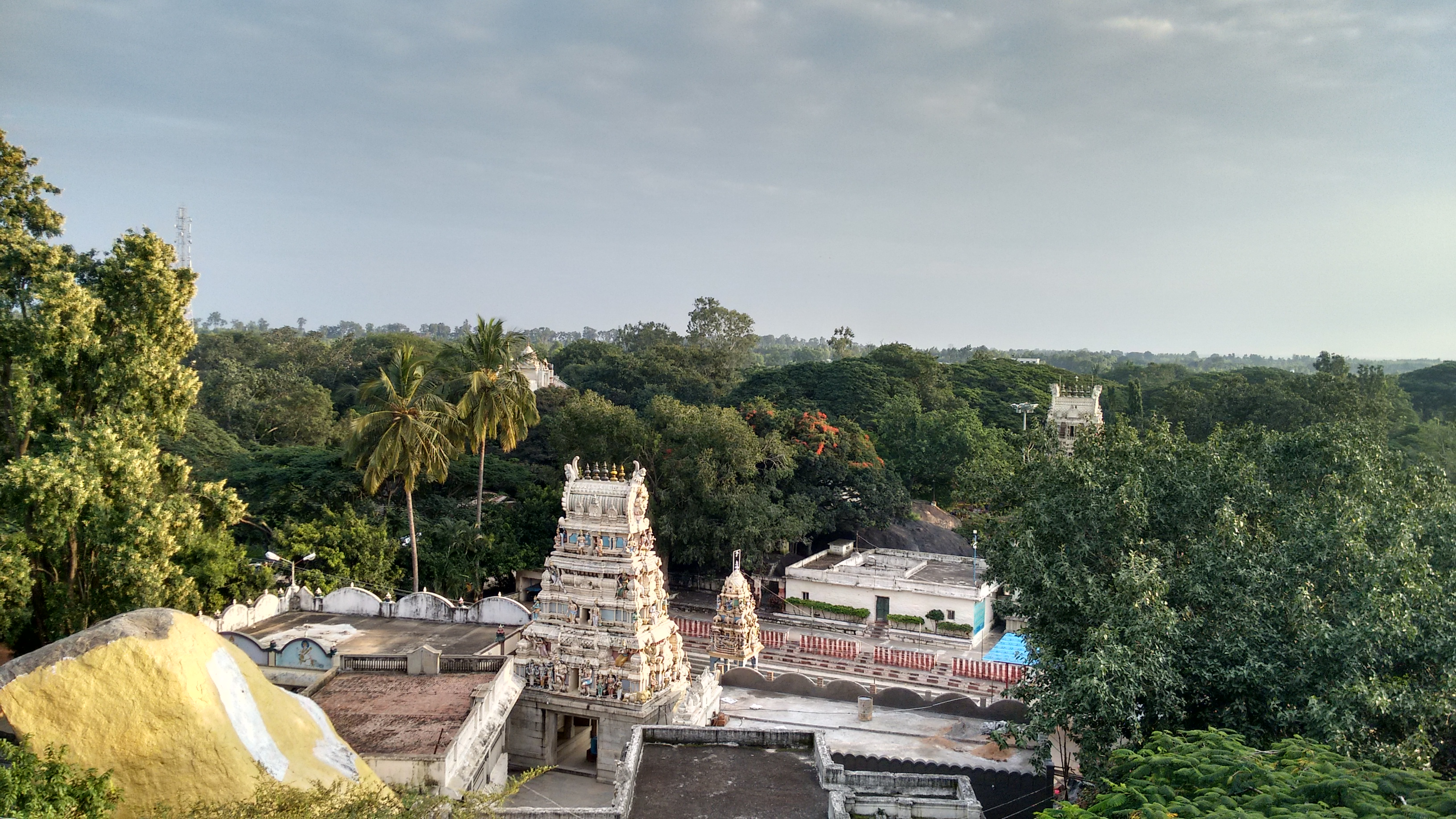

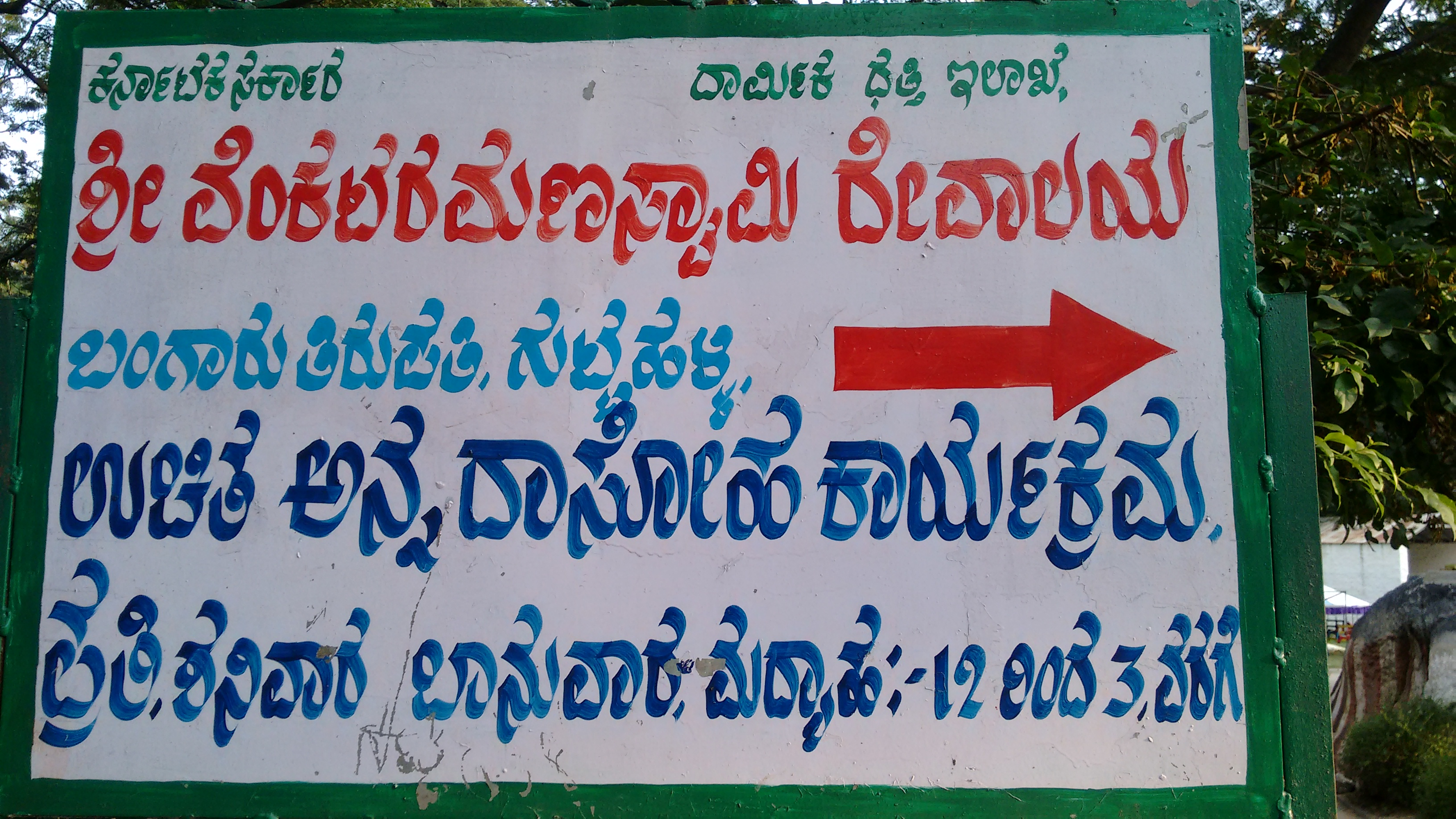

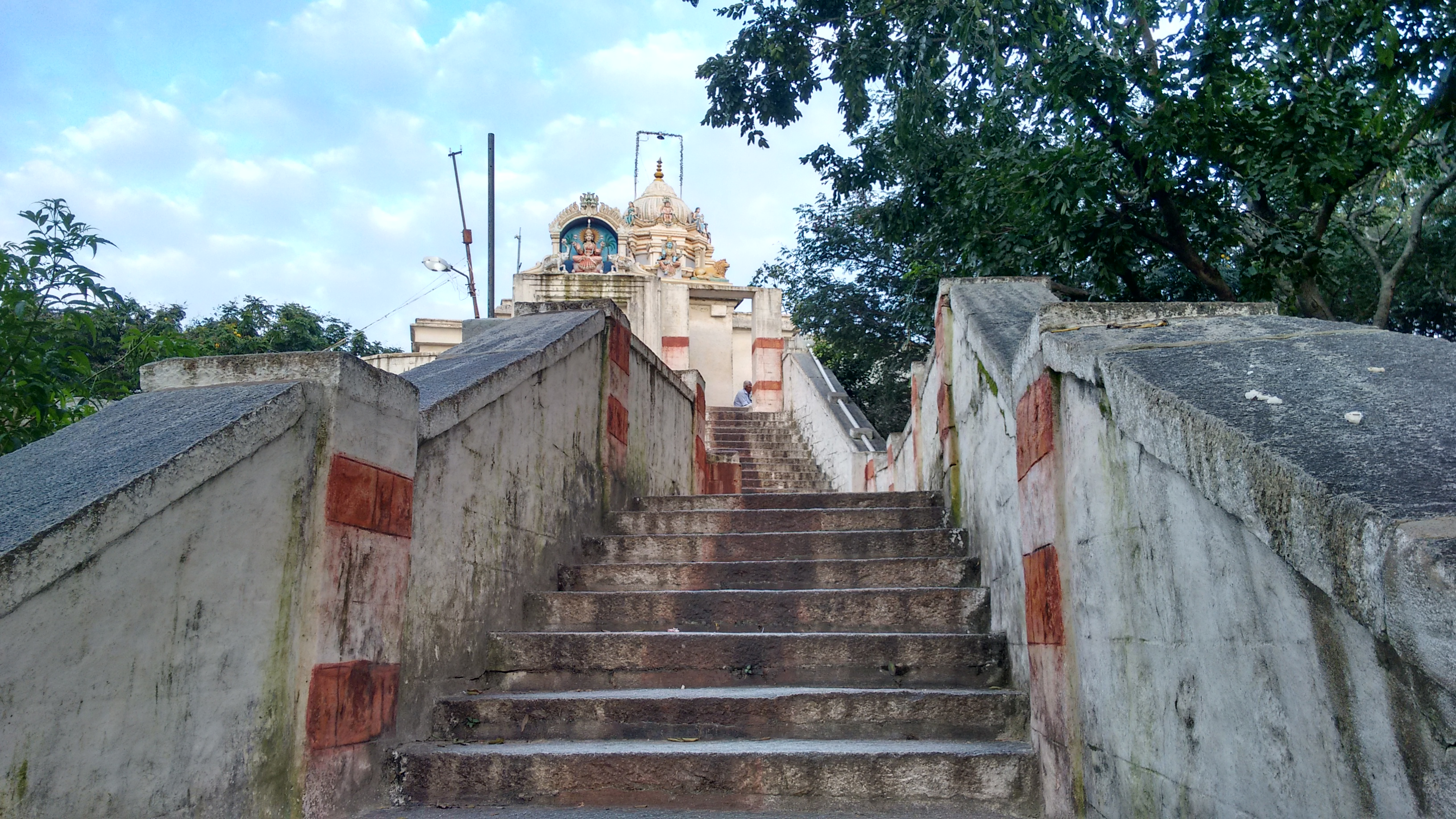

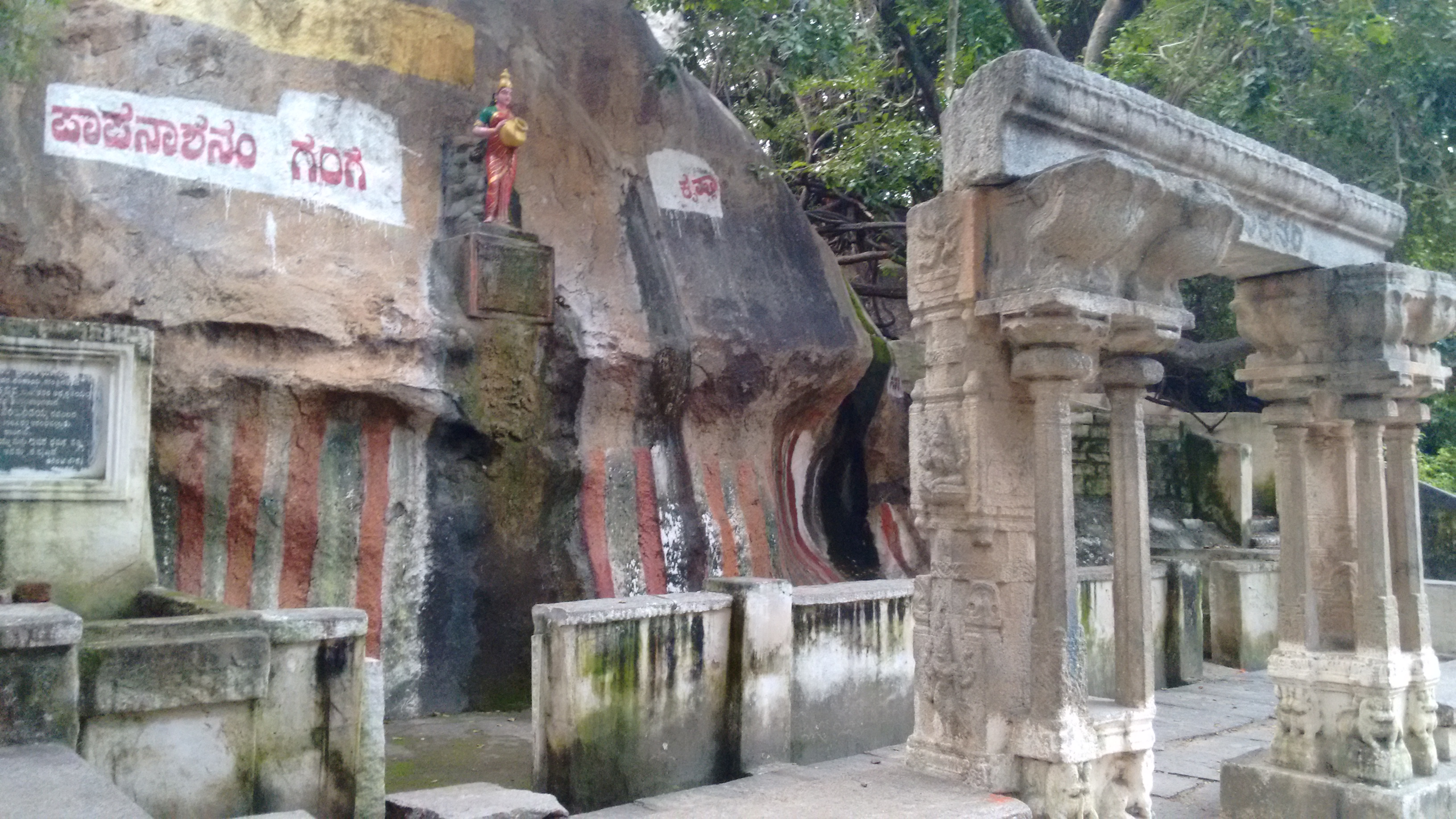

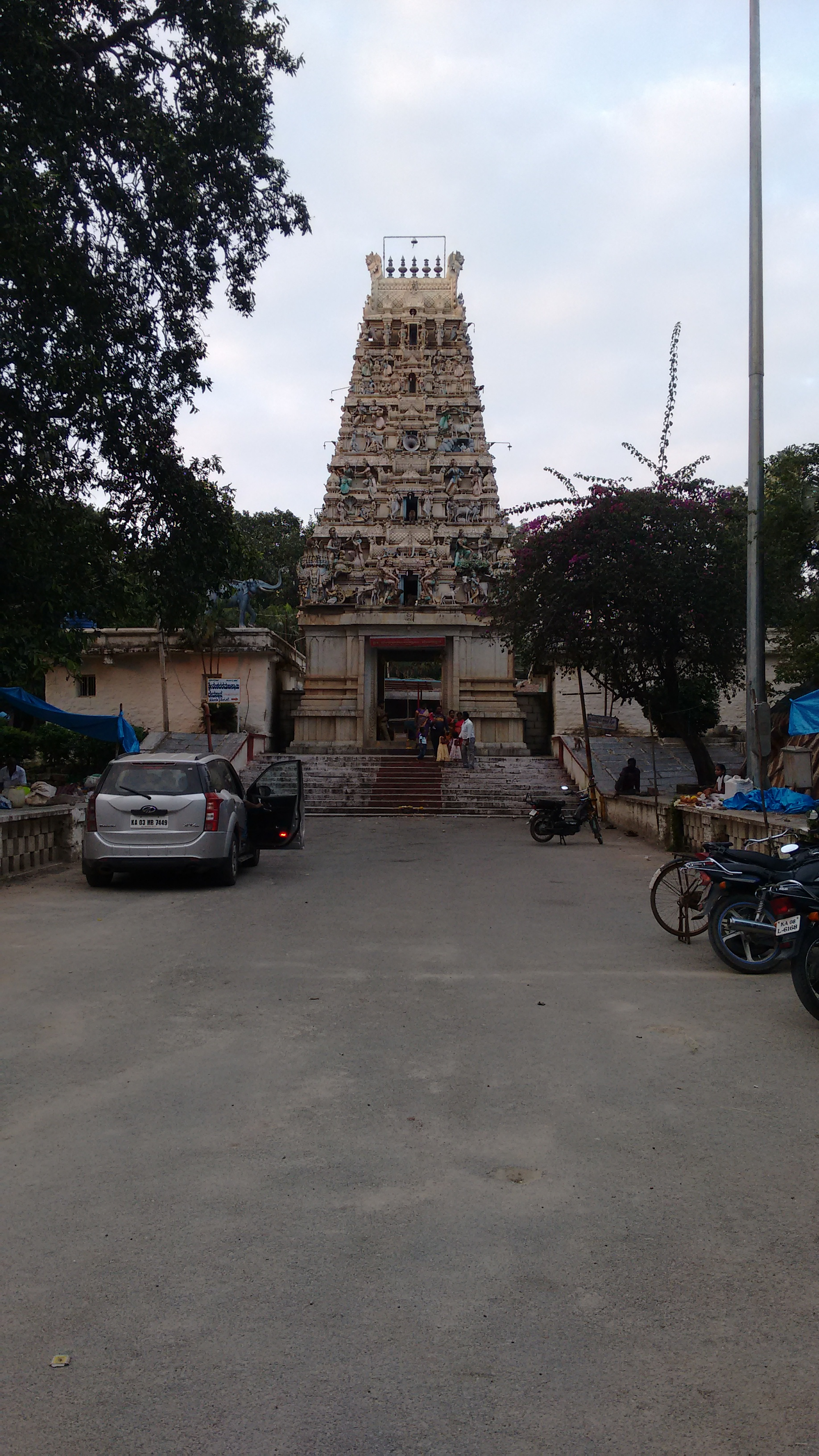
