= S. N. Subbareddy =

Indian politician (born 1966)

S. N. Subba Reddy (born 7 May 1966) is an Indian politician from Karnataka. He is a three time member of the Karnataka Legislative Assembly from Bagepalli Assembly constituency in Chikkaballapura district. He represented Indian National Congress and won the 2023 Karnataka Legislative Assembly election.

He was appointed chairman for Karnataka Stat Seeds Corporation on 26 January 2024.

== Early life and education ==
Reddy is from Bagepalli, Chikkaballapura district. His father is Nanjunda Reddy. He completed his SSLC in 1983 from Government High School, Gulur, Bagepalli Taluk and later did his teacher training certificate in 1986, TCH from Venkatesh TCH Training College, Marathahalli, Bangalore.

== Career ==
Reddy won from Bagepalli Assembly constituency representing Indian National Congress in the 2023 Karnataka Legislative Assembly election. He polled 82,128 votes and defeated his nearest rival, C. Muniraju of Bharatiya Janata Party, by a margin of 19,179 votes.

The Karnataka High Court on 16 February 2026 declared the election of S. N. Subbareddy in 2023 from the Bagepalli constituency invalid and void. According to the petition filed by BJP candidate C Muniraju, congress candidate Subbareddy filed incorrect nomination papers and concealed details regarding his assets and liabilities during the filing process.
