= Sharath Kumar Bache Gowda =

Indian politician

Member of the Karnataka Legislative Assembly
- Incumbent
- Assumed office 2019
- Preceded by: M. T. B. Nagaraj
- Constituency: Hosakote

Personal details
- Born: Sharath Kumar Bachegowda; 2 December 1981 (age 44) Bengaluru
- Party: Indian National Congress (2021-present)
- Other political affiliations: Independent (2019-2021), Bharatiya Janata Party (2014-2019)
- Spouse: Prathibha Sharath
- Parent: B. N. Bache Gowda (father)
- Education: Mechanical Engineering, PES University, Bangalore & MS in University of Michigan Ann Arbor

Sharath Kumar Bache Gowda is an Indian politician who is a current Member of the newly elected 16th Karnataka Legislative Assembly. He is elected from Hosakote as the Indian National Congress' candidate, and defeated sitting minister M. T. B. Nagaraj. He is son of Senior Bharatiya Janata Party Leader and Chikballapur Lok Sabha MP B. N. Bache Gowda. He was expelled from primary membership and contested the assembly by-election in 2019 as independent candidate for anti-party activity.

He was appointed chairman for Karnataka State Electronics Development Corporation Limited (KEONICS) on 26th January 2024.
