= Sulibele =

- village
- Location in Karnataka, India Sulibele (India)
- Coordinates: 13°10′N 77°48′E
- Country: India
- State: Karnataka
- District: Bengaluru North
- Talukas: Hosakote

Population (2011)
  - Total: 9,587

Languages
  - Official: Kannada
- Time zone: UTC+5:30 (IST)
- PIN: 562129

Sulibele is a village in the southern state of Karnataka, India. It is located in the Hosakote taluk of Bengaluru North district.

== Demographics ==
As of 2011India census, Sulibele had a population of 9587 with 4905 males and 4682 females.

== See also ==
- Bengaluru North district
- Districts of Karnataka
