= Kamakshipalya =

- Neighbourhood
- Country: India
- State: Karnataka
- Metro: Bengaluru

Languages
  - Official: Kannada
- Time zone: UTC+5:30 (IST)
- PIN: 560079

Kamakshipalya is a neighbourhood located in the western part of the city of Bangalore. Located along the Magadi Road, it is bound by Basaveshwaranagar, Vijayanagar and Nagarbhavi. The Outer Ring Road lies to the west of Kamakshipalya.

Kamakshipalya features in the list of ten traffic "black spots" of Bangalore compiled by the city traffic police, with the Nagarbhavi Ring Road–Magadi Road–Sumanahalli Flyover (Outer Ring Road) stretch witnessing large number of traffic accidents and deaths.
