= Basaveshwaranagara =

Basaveshwaranagar Basaveshwaranagar Basaveshwaranagar Basaveshwaranagar
- neighborhood
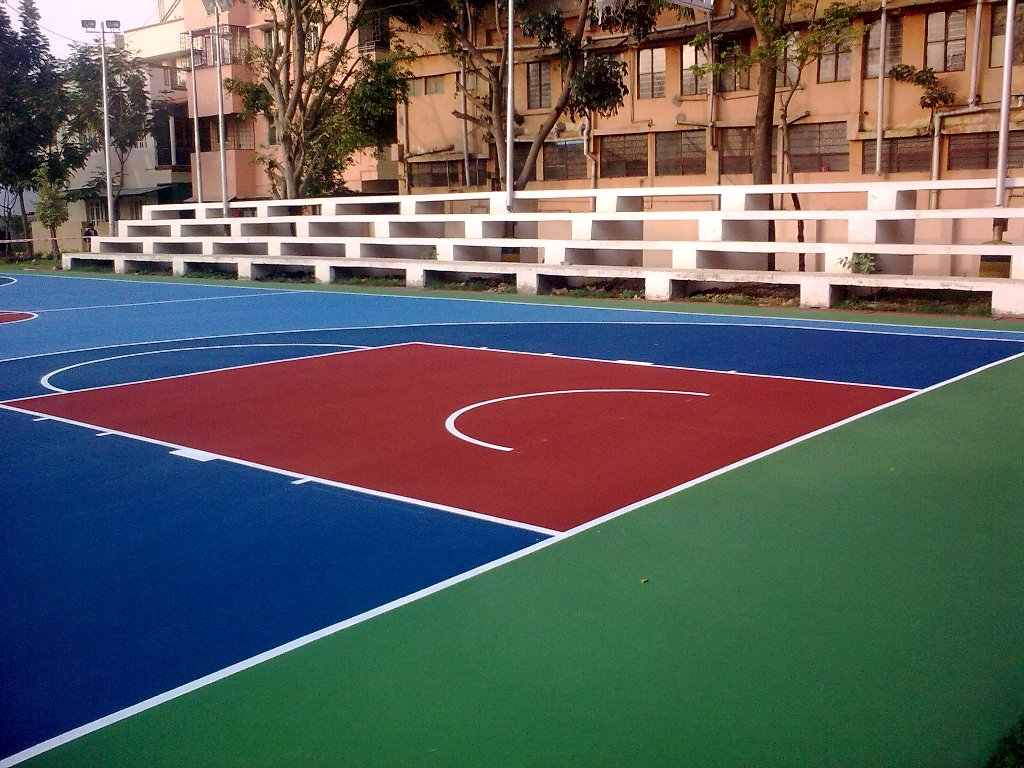
- Basketball Court, Dr. B. R. Ambedkar Stadium

- Location within Bengaluru
- Coordinates: 12°59′12″N 77°32′19″E
- Country: India
- State: Karnataka
- District: Bengaluru Urban
- Metro: Bengaluru
- Zone: West; South
- Ward: 74, 75, 99, 100, 101, 105, 107
- Established: 1970's
- Founded by: City Improvement Trust Board (now BDA)
- Named after: Basavanna
- Elevation: 914 m (2,999 ft)

Languages
  - Official: Kannada
- Time zone: UTC+5:30 (IST)
- PIN: 560079, 560086
- Telephone code: 91-80
- ISO 3166 code: IN-KA
- Vehicle registration: KA-02
- Lok Sabha: Bangalore Central; Bangalore North; Bangalore South
- Vidhan Sabha: Rajajinagar; Mahalakshmi Layout; Govindarajanagar

Basaveshwar nagar is a largely residential neighbourhood in the west of Bengaluru, Karnataka, India. It is located to the west of Rajajinagar and is sandwiched between the localities of Mahalakshmi Layout to the north and Vijayanagar to the south, spread across multiple sub-localities, three assembly constituencies and seven Bruhat Bengaluru Mahanagara Palike (BBMP) wards. The area of Basaveshwaranagar is often considered West of Chord Road as it lies to the west of Chord Road, an arterial road in the western part of Bengaluru.

== Etymology ==
Basaveshwaranagar is named after Basavanna (also known as Basaveshwar), a social reformer whose followers comprise the Lingayat community.

== History ==
Basaveshwaranagar was formed as an extension by the City Improvement Trust Board (currently the Bangalore Development Authority) in stages between the 1970s and early 1980s. At that time (even now unofficially), the area was known as West of Chord Road (WCR), as it lay to the west of the Chord Road which at the time was considered the western end of the city. There were also many private layouts in the area formed in the 1970s by public and private sector organisations for their employees such as LIC, Kirloskar Group, SBI and BEML among others. The close proximity of Basaveshwaranagar to the KSR Bengaluru Station, Kempegowda Bus Station, the Bengaluru Pete, residential-cum-commercial localities like Rajajinagar and Malleswaram and the Peenya industrial area helped its growth. Today, Basaveshwaranagara is an important residential and commercial hub in West Bangalore. But since Basaveshwaranagar is very far away from the IT Corridor (a large area in the eastern and south-eastern parts of Bangalore city with IT and software parks and SEZs), large-scale development in the area has been minimal and Basaveshwaranagara is today considered one of the greenest and more conservative localities of Bengaluru city.

== Geography ==
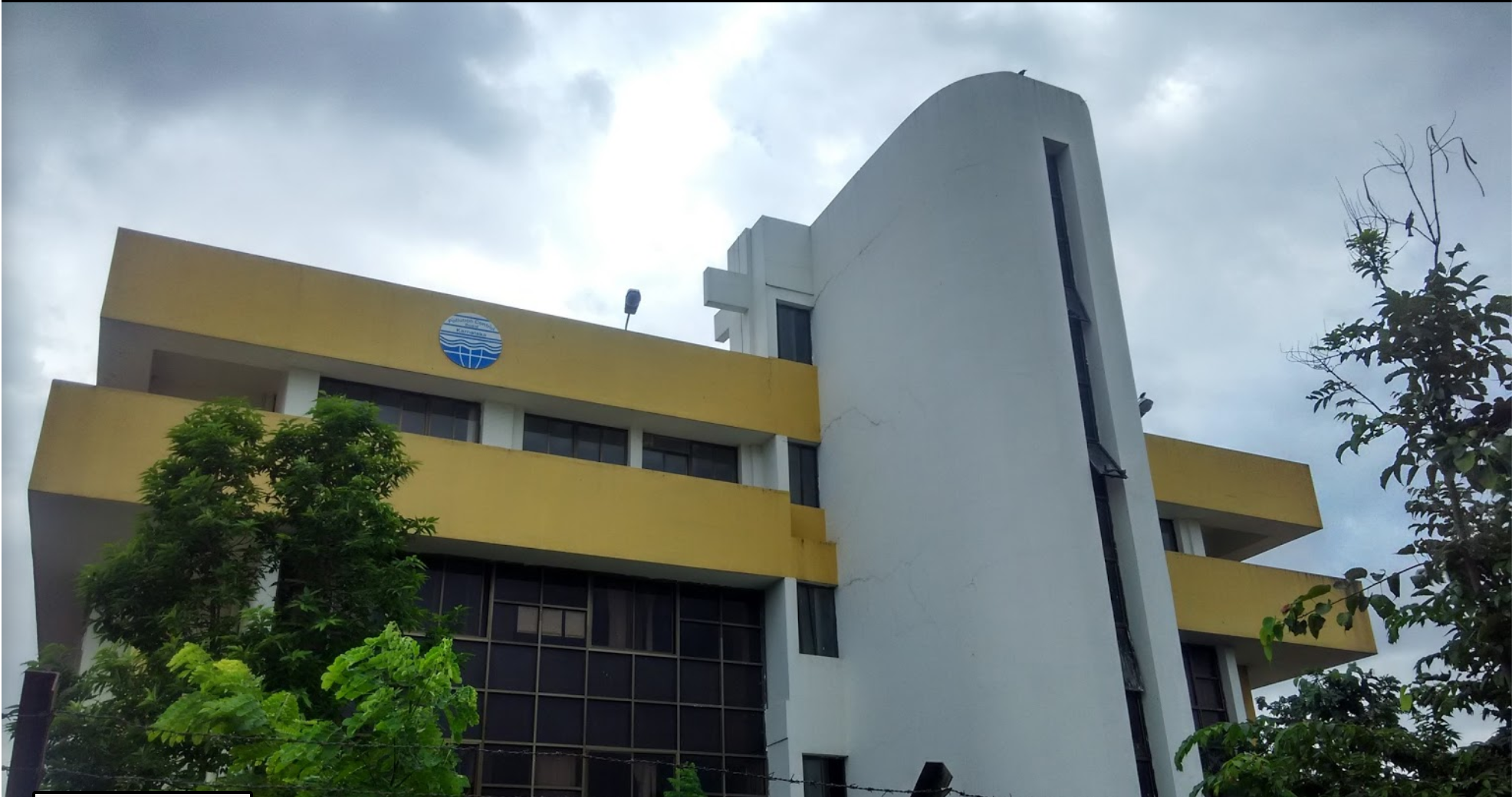
Karnataka State Pollution Control Board, Saneguruvanahalli

Basaveshwaranagar is situated in the western part of Bangalore, about 914 metres above sea level, at 12°98' N and 77°53' E. Nearby areas include Rajajinagar, Mahalakshmi Layout, Nandini Layout, Laggere, Sunkadakatte and Vijayanagar.

The terrain of Basaveshwaranagar is quite hilly and uneven. The area is known for its steep and hilly roads which rise high and low. The area was also known for lakes such as the Agrahara Dasarahalli Lake, Kurubarahalli Lake and Saneguruvahalli Lake among others. All the lakes have dried up in recent time and residential layouts or parks have been built over them.

Basaveshwaranagar is considered to be the least polluted locality in Bengaluru city, with real-time air quality level coming well within Good levels of 0–50 most of the time. There is an air quality monitoring station at Saneguruvanahalli maintained by the Karnataka State Pollution Control Board (KSPCB).

== Climate ==
Under the Köppen climate classification, Bangalore including Basaveshwaranagar itself experiences a tropical savanna climate (Aw). Due to its high elevation, a more moderate climate throughout the year is experienced, although occasional heat waves can make summer somewhat uncomfortable. The coolest month is December with an average low temperature of 15.4 °C (59.7 °F) and the hottest month is April with an average high temperature of 36 °C (97 °F). The highest temperature ever recorded is 38.9 °C (102 °F) (recorded in March 1931). The lowest ever recorded is 7.8 °C (46 °F) (recorded in January 1884). Winter temperatures rarely drop below 12 °C (54 °F), and summer temperatures seldom exceed 37 °C (99 °F). Receiving rainfall from both the northeast and the southwest monsoons; the wettest months are September, October and August. The summer heat is moderated by fairly frequent thunderstorms, which occasionally cause power outages and local flooding. The heaviest rainfall recorded in a 24-hour period is 179 millimetres (7 in) recorded on 1 October 1997.

Climate data for Bengaluru (1991–2020, extremes 1883–present)
Month	Jan	Feb	Mar	Apr	May	Jun	Jul	Aug	Sep	Oct	Nov	Dec	Year
Record high °C (°F)	33.4 (92.1)	35.9 (96.6)	37.9 (100.2)	39.2 (102.6)	38.9 (102.0)	38.1 (100.6)	33.3 (91.9)	33.3 (91.9)	33.3 (91.9)	32.4 (90.3)	33.0 (91.4)	31.1 (88.0)	39.2 (102.6)
Mean maximum °C (°F)	31.1 (88.0)	34.1 (93.4)	35.5 (95.9)	37.0 (98.6)	35.8 (96.4)	31.8 (89.2)	31.1 (88.0)	30.8 (87.4)	31.4 (88.5)	31.4 (88.5)	30.8 (87.4)	30.3 (86.5)	37.2 (99.0)
Mean daily maximum °C (°F)	28.4 (83.1)	30.9 (87.6)	33.4 (92.1)	34.1 (93.4)	33.1 (91.6)	29.7 (85.5)	28.3 (82.9)	28.1 (82.6)	28.6 (83.5)	28.5 (83.3)	27.4 (81.3)	26.9 (80.4)	29.8 (85.6)
Daily mean °C (°F)	22.3 (72.1)	24.3 (75.7)	26.8 (80.2)	28.1 (82.6)	27.4 (81.3)	25.2 (77.4)	24.2 (75.6)	24.1 (75.4)	24.3 (75.7)	24.0 (75.2)	22.9 (73.2)	21.7 (71.1)	24.6 (76.3)
Mean daily minimum °C (°F)	16.1 (61.0)	17.6 (63.7)	20.2 (68.4)	22.1 (71.8)	21.8 (71.2)	20.6 (69.1)	20.1 (68.2)	20.0 (68.0)	20.0 (68.0)	19.8 (67.6)	18.3 (64.9)	16.4 (61.5)	19.4 (66.9)
Mean minimum °C (°F)	13.4 (56.1)	14.9 (58.8)	17.3 (63.1)	20.5 (68.9)	20.5 (68.9)	19.5 (67.1)	19.2 (66.6)	18.4 (65.1)	17.2 (63.0)	16.6 (61.9)	15.3 (59.5)	14.2 (57.6)	12.7 (54.9)
Record low °C (°F)	7.8 (46.0)	9.4 (48.9)	11.1 (52.0)	14.4 (57.9)	16.7 (62.1)	16.7 (62.1)	16.1 (61.0)	14.4 (57.9)	15.0 (59.0)	13.2 (55.8)	9.6 (49.3)	8.9 (48.0)	7.8 (46.0)
Average rainfall mm (inches)	1.6 (0.06)	7.1 (0.28)	14.7 (0.58)	61.7 (2.43)	128.7 (5.07)	110.3 (4.34)	116.4 (4.58)	162.7 (6.41)	208.3 (8.20)	186.4 (7.34)	64.5 (2.54)	15.4 (0.61)	1,077.8 (42.43)
Average rainy days	0.2	0.3	1.1	4.0	7.5	6.8	8.0	10.2	9.5	9.6	4.2	1.3	62.7
Average relative humidity (%) (at 17:30 IST)	41	32	29	35	47	62	65	67	64	65	61	53	52
Average dew point °C (°F)	13 (55)	12 (54)	13 (55)	17 (63)	19 (66)	19 (66)	19 (66)	19 (66)	19 (66)	18 (64)	17 (63)	15 (59)	17 (62)
Mean monthly sunshine hours	262.3	247.6	271.4	257.0	241.1	136.8	111.8	114.3	143.6	173.1	190.2	211.7	2,360.9
Average ultraviolet index	10	12	12	12	12	12	12	12	12	12	10	10	12
Source 1: India Meteorological Department Time and Date (dewpoints, 2005–2015)
Source 2: NOAA (sun: 1971–1990), Tokyo Climate Center (mean temperatures 1991–2020); Weather Atlas March record high

== Localities ==
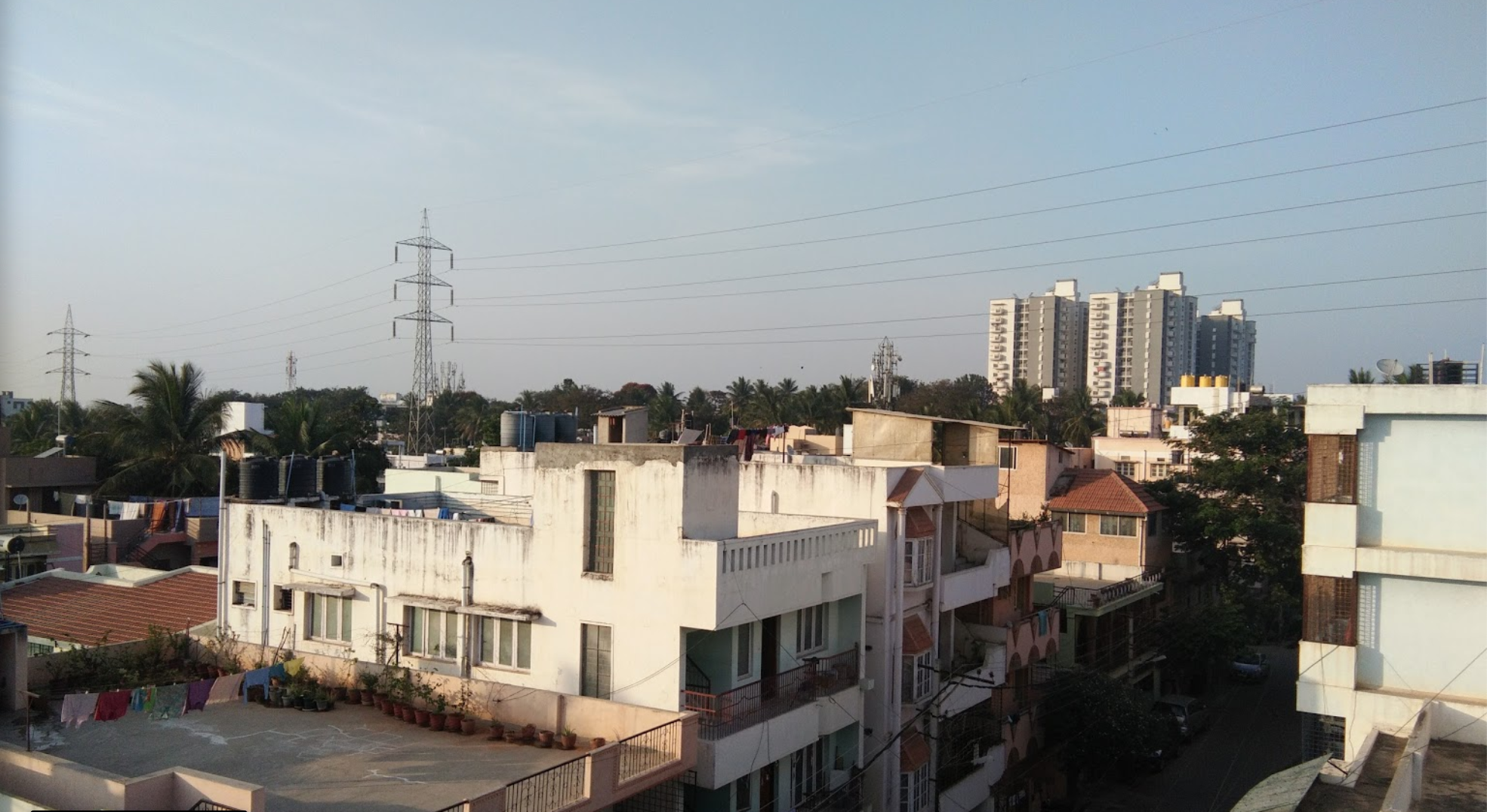
Kirloskar Colony, Basaveshwaranagar, Bangalore

Basaveshwaranagara is divided into four stages, which are further subdivided into blocks. The area also subsumes sub-localities such as:

- Agrahara Dasarahalli
- Ashtagrama Layout
- Bhimajyotinagara
- Bovi Colony
- Gruhalakshmi Layout
- Indiranagar
- Kamalanagar
- Kamalanagar Bharat Earth Movers Limited (BEML) Layout
- Karnataka Housing Board (KHB) Colony
- Kirloskar Colony
- Kurubarahalli
- Lakshmi Nagar
- Life Insurance Corporation of India (LIC) Model Housing Colony
- Manjunatha Nagara
- Saneguruvanahalli
- Satyanarayana Layout
- Shakti Ganapati Nagara
- Sharada Colony
- Shivanagar
- Shivanahalli
- Sri Venkateshwara Krupa (SVK) Layout
- State Bank of India (SBI) Colony
- SVNGSS Layout
- Teachers Colony
- Vinayaka Housing Board Cooperative Society (VHBCS) Layout

== Civic administration ==
=== Politics ===
Basaveshwaranagar comes under three Vidhan Sabha constituencies: Rajajinagar, Mahalakshmi Layout and Govindarajanagar, which are led by former Minister S. Suresh Kumar (BJP), K. Gopalaiah (JD(S)) and former Minister V. Somanna (BJP) respectively. While most of Basaveshwaranagar falls under the Rajajinagar constituency, some sub-localities like LIC Model Housing Colony, Bhimajyothinagar, Kirloskar Colony, Shakthi Ganapathi Nagar, Sathyanarayana Layout, SBI Colony, Kamalanagar and Kurubarahalli come under the Mahalakshmi Layout constituency. Agrahara Dasarahalli comes under the Govindarajanagar constituency. Rajajinagar, Mahalakshmi Layout and Govindarajanagar assembly constituencies in turn fall under the Lok Sabha constituencies of Bangalore Central, Bangalore North and Bangalore South respectively. While Bangalore Central and North constituencies are represented by P. C. Mohan (BJP) and former Chief Minister of Karnataka D. V. Sadananda Gowda (BJP) respectively, Bangalore South is represented by Tejasvi Surya (BJP), who is the youngest Member of Parliament as of 2019.

=== BBMP wards ===
Basaveshwaranagar is spread across seven wards of the Bruhat Bengaluru Mahanagara Palike (BBMP). One of these wards (Ward 100) goes by the name of Basaveshwaranagar itself. Barring this ward and also Ward 74 (Shakthi Ganapathi Nagar), none of the other BBMP wards fully lie within Basaveshwaranagar.

Basaveshwaranagar BBMP Ward information
Ward no.	Ward name	Land Area (km^{2})	Population (2011 census)	BBMP Zone	Assembly constituency	Parliamentary constituency	Corporator
74	Shakthi Ganapathi Nagar	5.84	43,844	Rajarajeshwari Nagar	Mahalakshmi Layout	Bangalore North	Gangamma Rajanna
75	Shankar Mutt	0.7	48,734	Rajarajeshwari Nagar	Mahalakshmi Layout	Bangalore North	M. Shivaraju
99	Rajajinagar	0.56	32,913	Vijayanagar	Rajajinagar	Bangalore Central	G. Krishnamurthy
100	Basaveshwaranagar	0.86	33,084	Vijayanagar	Rajajinagar	Bangalore Central	Umavathi Padmaraj
101	Kamakshipalya	0.84	30,333	Vijayanagar	Rajajinagar	Bangalore Central	Pratima R.
105	Agrahara Dasarahalli	0.77	26,873	Vijayanagar	Govindarajanagar	Bangalore South	Shilpa G. Sridhar
107	Shivanagar	0.99	24,181	Vijayanagar	Rajajinagar	Bangalore Central	Manjula Vijayakumar

=== Post office ===
Basaveshwaranagar post office is located along the Siddaiah Puranik Road, opposite S. Cadambi Vidya Kendra. The pincode for the area is 560079. However, the northern parts of Basaveshwaranagar like Kirloskar Colony, Bhimajyothinagar and Kurubarahalli among others come under the Mahalakshmi Layout post office. The pincode for this post office is 560086.

=== Police station ===
Basaveshwaranagar has its own police station. The police station was earlier located near Havanur Circle opposite to Pavithra Paradise. It was later shifted to its current location on the 1st Main Road, near to the Dr. Ambedkar stadium. It comes under the jurisdiction of West division DCP of Bangalore city and Vijayanagar division ACP.

The area does not have its own traffic police station and falls under the Vijayanagar Traffic Police jurisdiction.

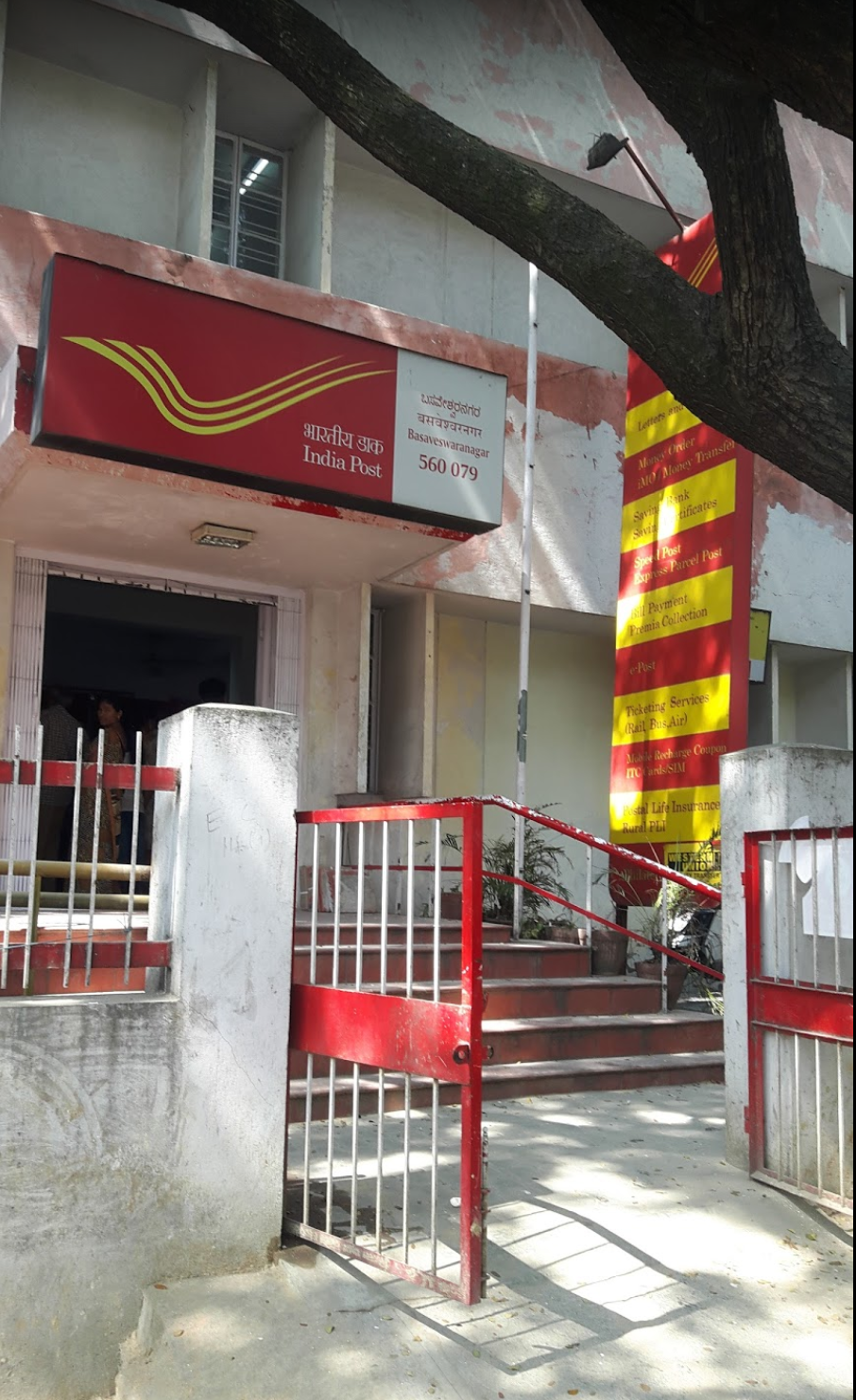
Basaveshwaranagar Post Office

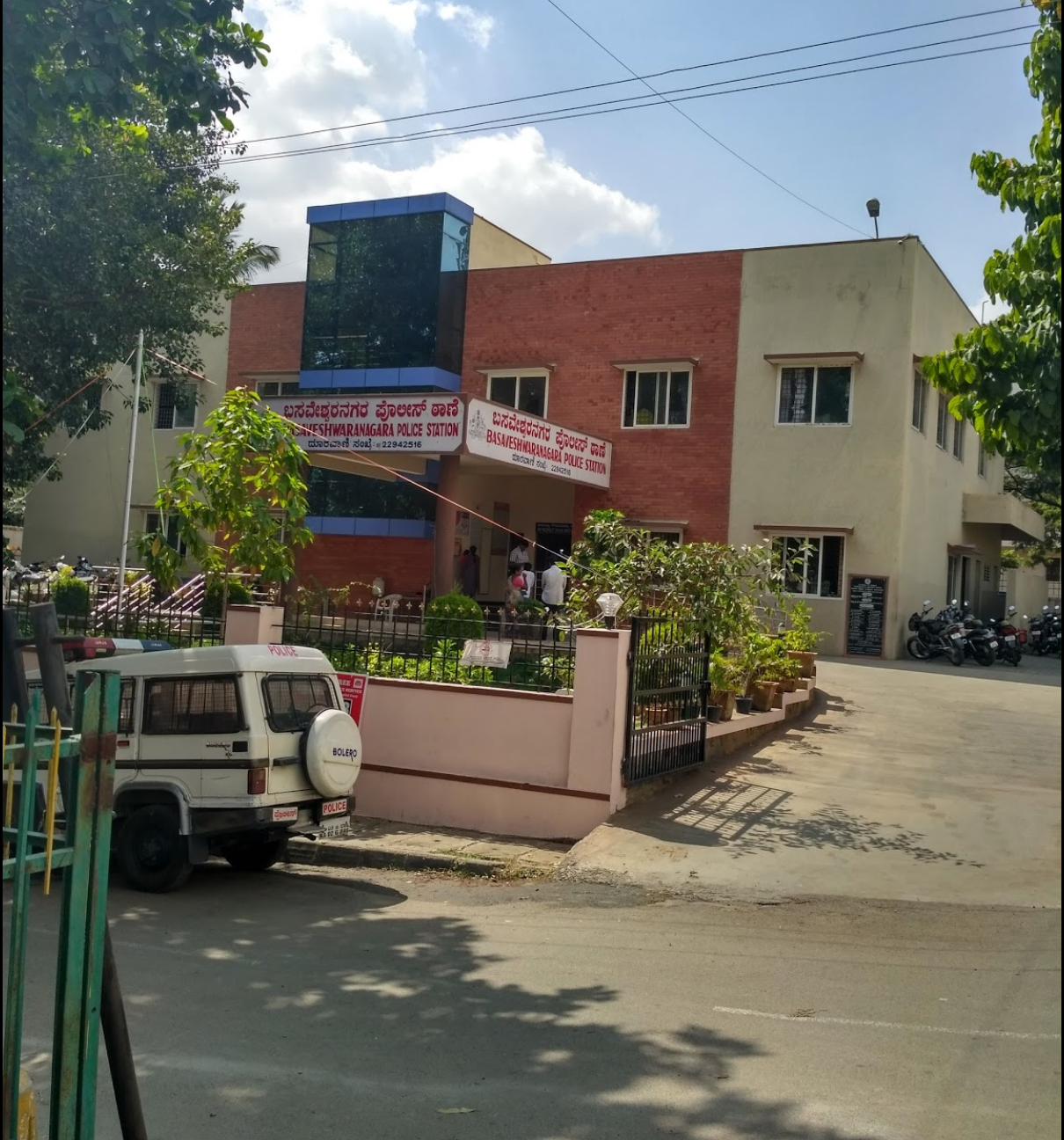
Basaveshwaranagar Police Station

== Transport ==
=== Roads ===
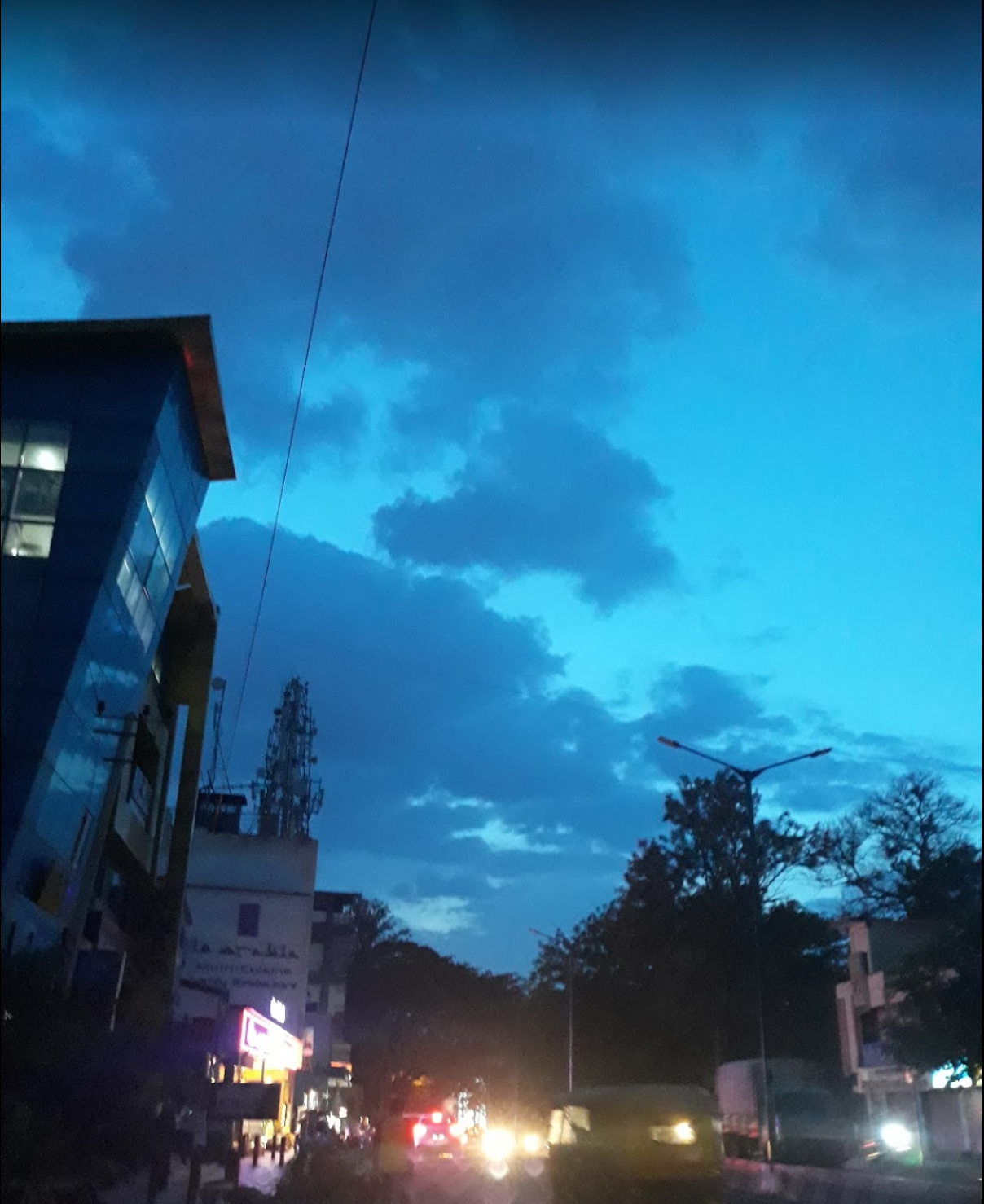
Dr. M. C. Modi Hospital Road, near Shankar Mutt circle

The main roads of Basaveshwaranagar are:

- Siddaiah Puranik Road: It is also known as the 1st Cross Road and is the main commercial hub of Basaveshwaranagar with many shopping centres, banks, restaurants and hospitals. It connects Shankar Mutt in the north with Magadi Road in the south.
- 60 Feet Road: It is also known as the 1st Main Road. It connects Chord Road in the east with the Basaveshwaranagar Bus Stand in the west. Like Siddaiah Puranik Road, this road is also an important commercial hub. This road intersects with Siddaiah Puranik Road at Havanur Circle.
- Dr. M. C. Modi Hospital Road: This road connects Chord Road in the east with Shankar Mutt in the west. The Modi Eye Hospital is located on this road, hence this road is named as Dr. M. C. Modi Hospital Road.

Apart from these roads, there are other important roads in the locality such as 8th Main Road (BEML Layout Road), 15th Main Road (Kamalanagar Main Road), Kurubarahalli Main Road and Thimmaiah Road (Shivanahalli Main Road).

=== Metro ===
Basaveshwaranagar is easily accessible from both the Green Line and Purple Line of the Namma Metro. The nearest station on the Green Line is Rajajinagar, which is located 2 km from Basaveshwaranagar, while the nearest Purple Line station, Hosahalli, is 3 km away. Basaveshwaranagar's connectivity to the Namma Metro will be further improved after Phase 3 of the Namma Metro is completed, where a line from Magadi Road to Kadabagere passing through KHB Colony and Kamakshipalya will be built.

=== Buses ===
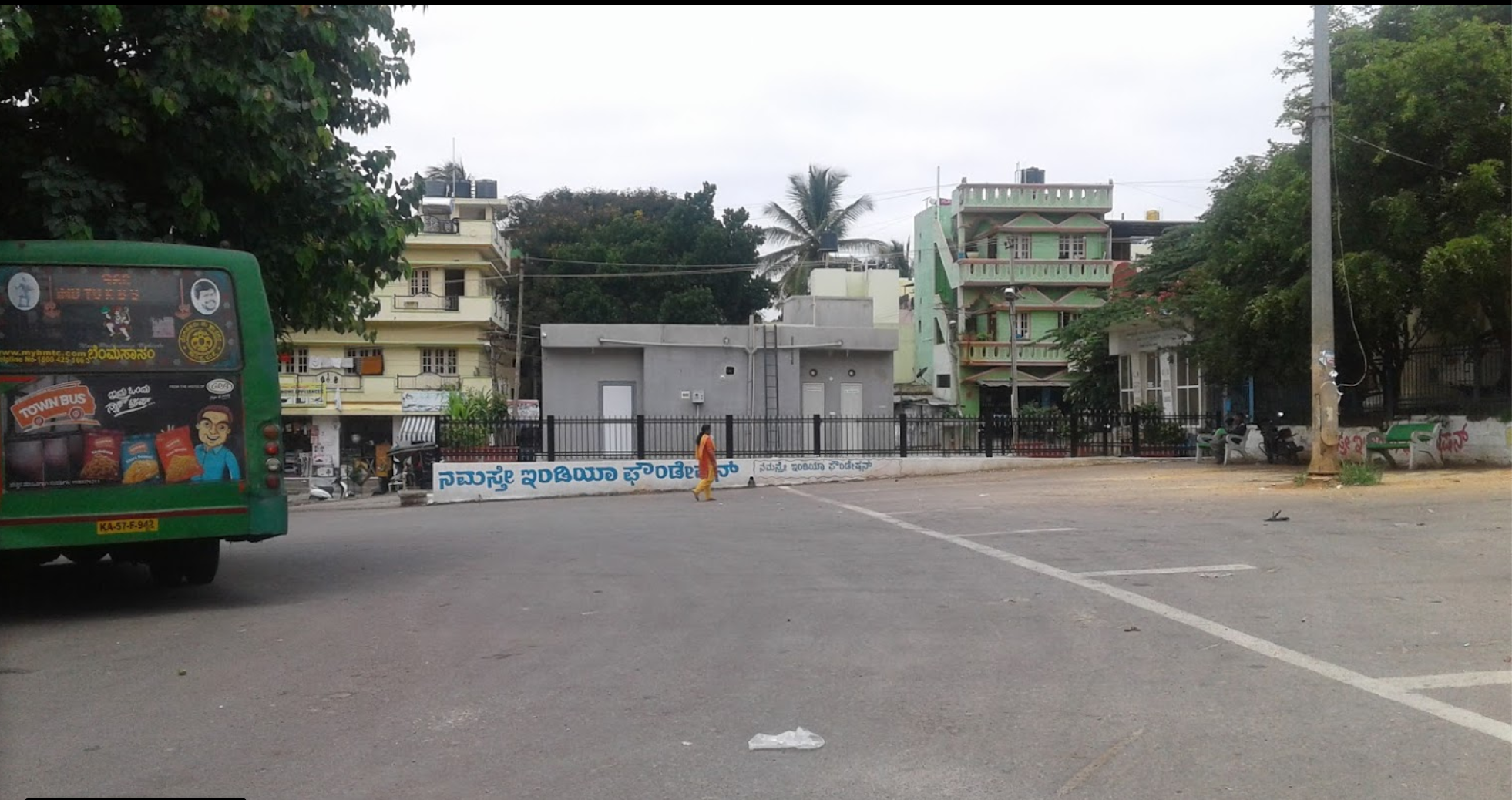
Shankar Nag Bus Station, Kamalanagar, Basaveshwaranagar, Bangalore

Bangalore Metropolitan Transport Corporation (BMTC) runs a good fleet of buses to Basaveshwaranagar, connecting it with all the important business districts in the city. There are seven bus stations in the locality:

1. Basaveshwaranagar Main Bus Stand in 60 Feet Road (Also known as Sharada Colony Bus Stand as it is located in Sharada Colony)
2. BEML Layout Bus Stand in 8th Main Road
3. Shankar Nag Bus Station in Kamalanagar
4. Basaveshwaranagar 3rd Stage Bus Stand in Saneguruvanahalli
5. KHB Colony Bus Stand in Magadi Road
6. Bhimajyothinagar Bus Stand near Shankar Mutt
7. Kurubarahalli Bus Stand

The Kempegowda Bus Station for boarding intercity and interstate buses is just 5 km away from Basaveshwaranagar.

== Economy ==
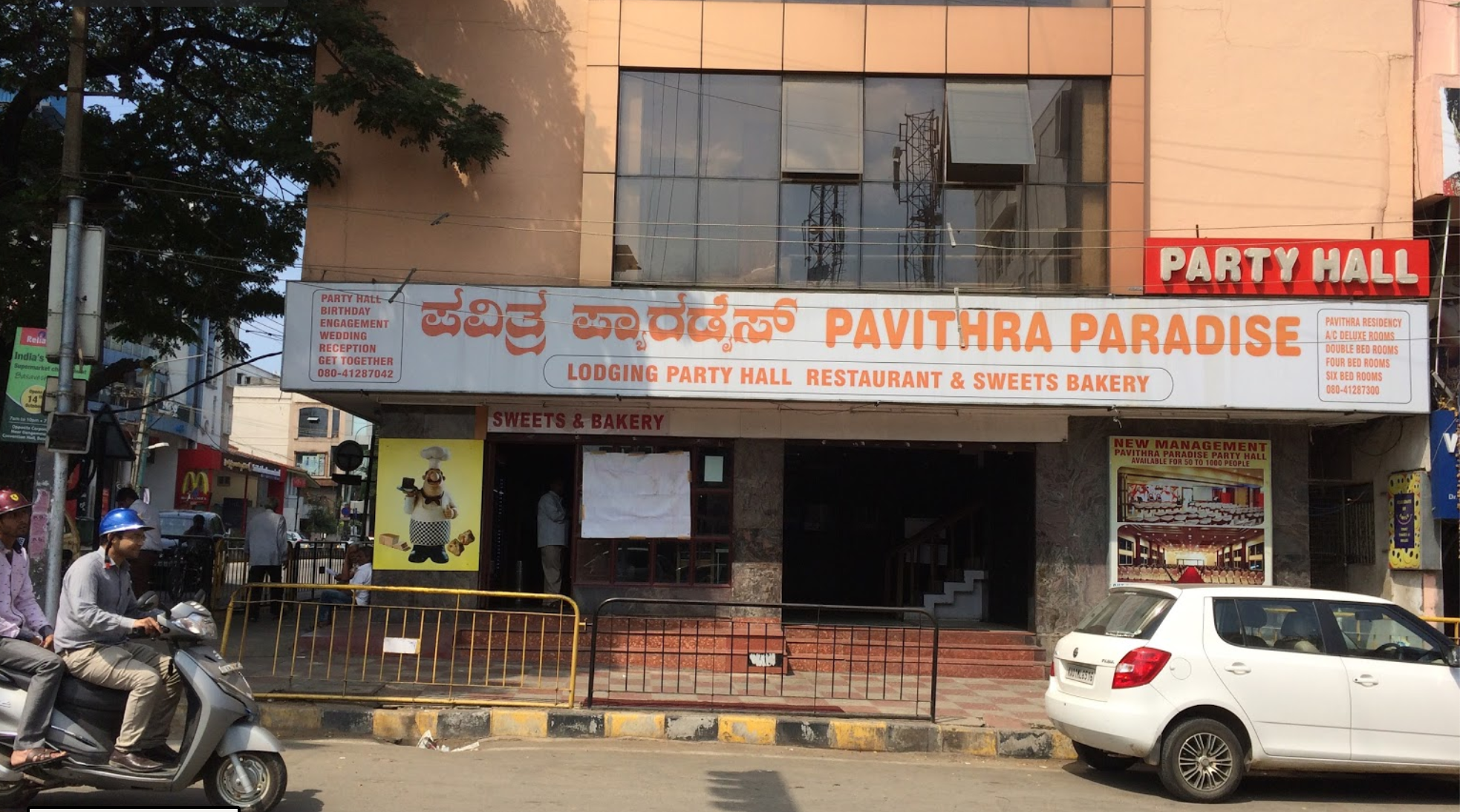
Pavithra Paradise

Basaveshwaranagar is home to many industry, banking and retail outlets.

The Siddaiah Puranik Road is the main commercial hub of Basaveshwaranagar. It has many stores ranging from supermarkets and bakeries to pharmacies, branded and generic clothing retail and watch shops among others. Many public sector and private sector bank branches are located along this road as well. The Kurubarahalli Main Road and the 60 Feet Road also have many shopping and banking facilities. Off Havanur Circle is the roadside Basaveshwaranagar market, which sells fresh fruits and vegetables apart from serving street food.

Basaveshwaranagar is also home to a considerable number of restaurants, which includes international dining chains, ice-cream parlours, coffee shops, multi-cuisine and cuisine-specific restaurants. The locality, due to its considerable North Karnataka population, has many "khanavalis" which serve authentic North Karnataka cuisine.

== Educational institutions ==
Basaveshwaranagar has a considerable number of educational institutions, both at the primary/secondary education and higher education level.

The area consists of renowned schools such as Carmel High School, Sri Vani Education Centre, National Academy For Learning (NAFL), S. Cadambi Vidya Kendra, St. Mira's High School, VLS International School and Florence High School to name a few. The famous National Public School, Rajajinagar is located just outside Basaveshwaranagar on the Chord Road. There are also pre-university colleges including Carmel Pre-University College, S. Cadambi Independent Pre-University College and Vidya Vardhaka Sangha (VVS) Sardar Patel Pre-University College. One Karnataka Government aided degree college V.V.S. First Grade College.

Basaveshwaranagar also has two government colleges: the Government Homeopathic Medical College and Hospital located on Siddaiah Puranik Road near KHB Colony bus stop and the Government Unani Medical College and Hospital off Havanur Circle.

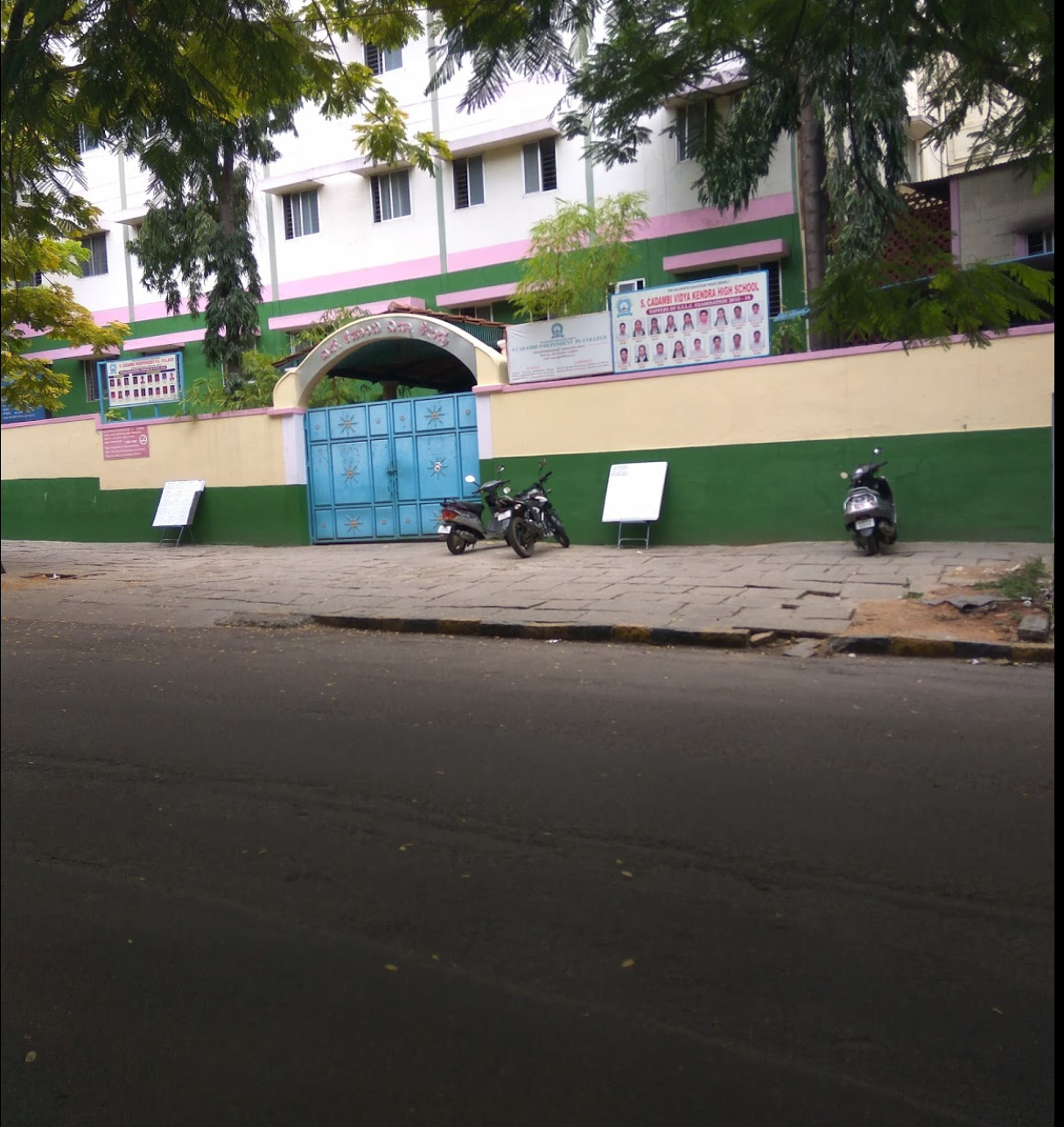
S. Cadambi Vidya Kendra

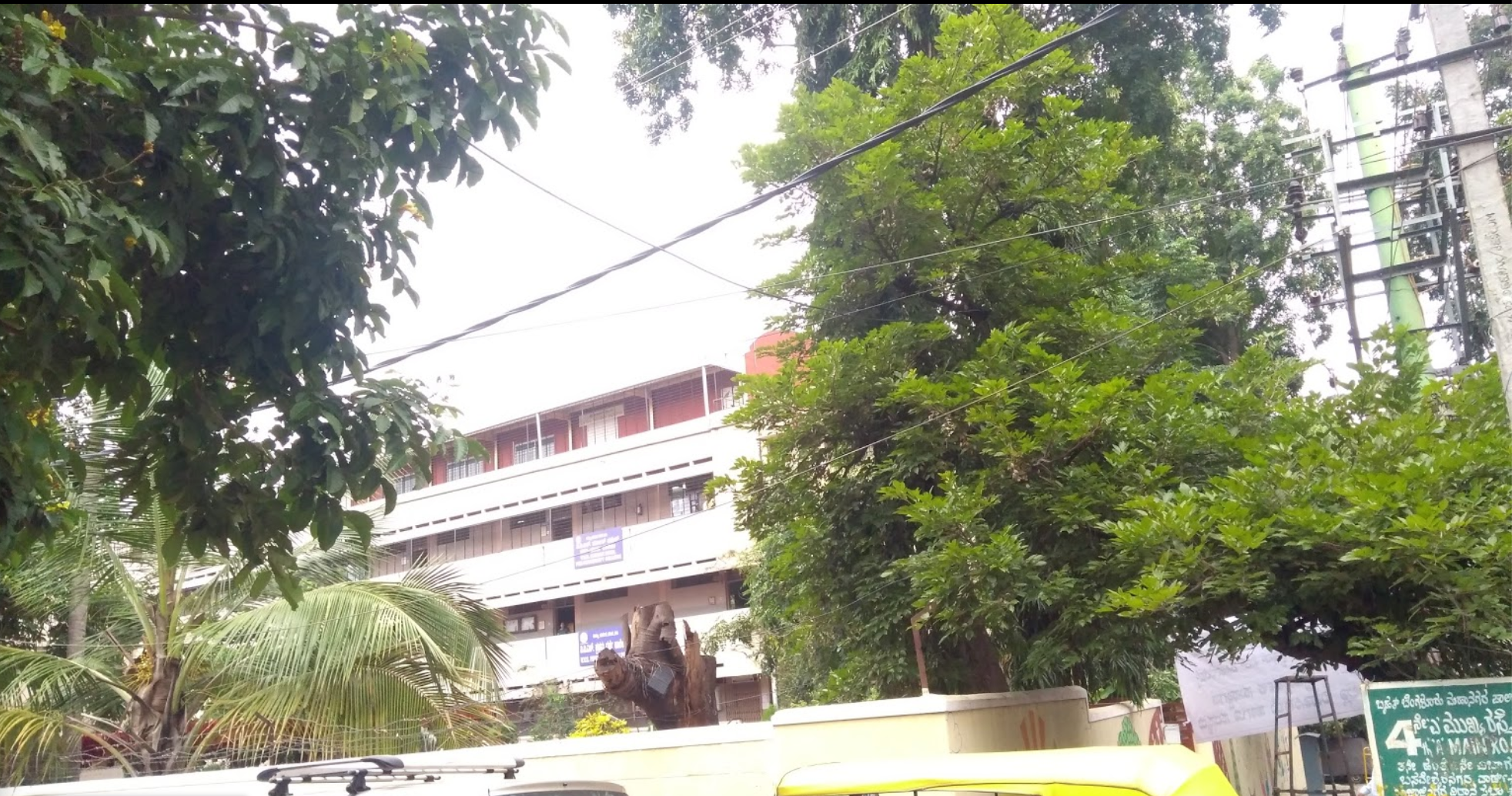
V. V. S. Sardar Patel Pre-University College

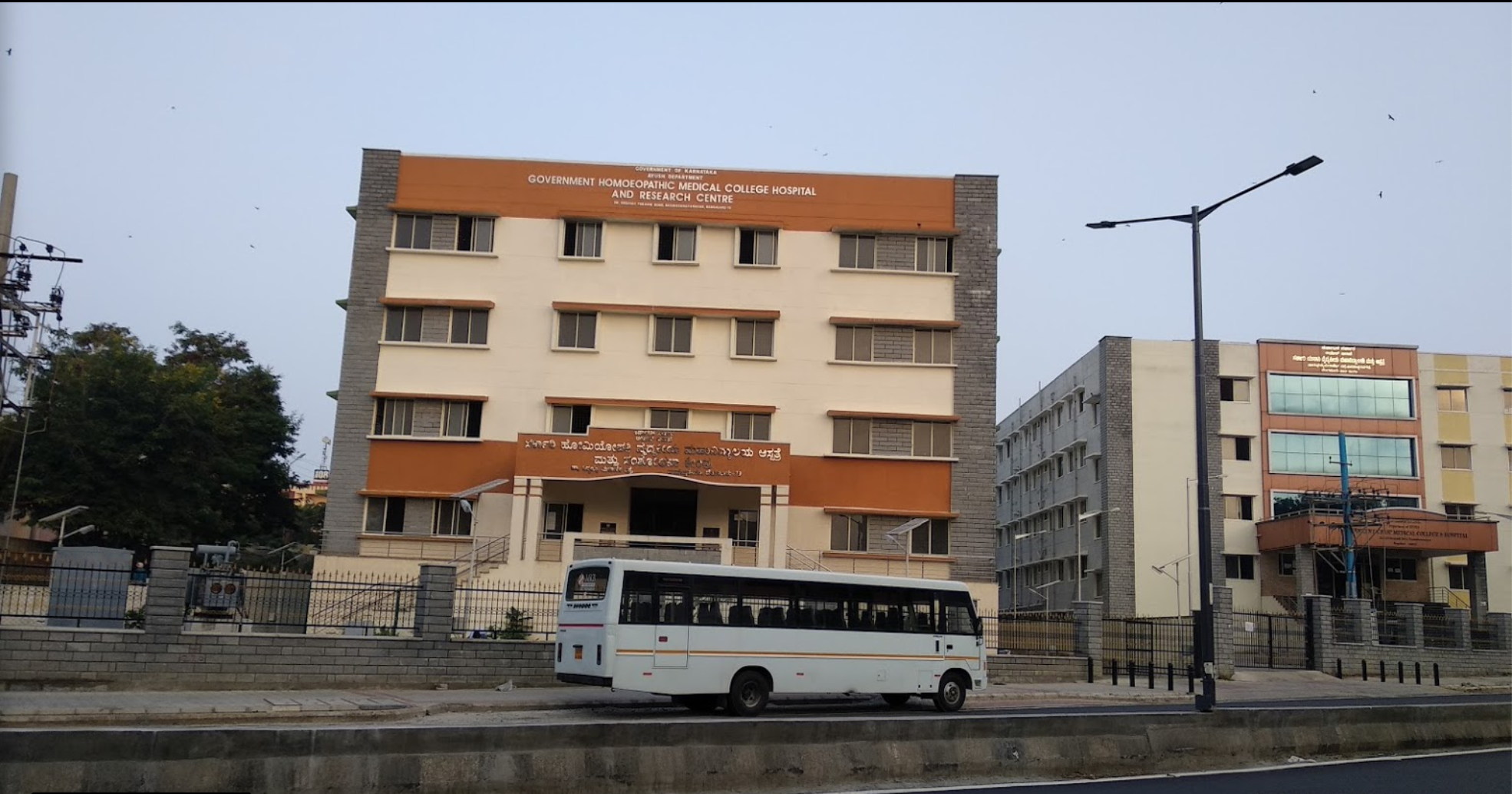
Government Homeopathy Medical College

== Recreation ==
Basaveshwaranagar has many recreational spaces including parks, open grounds and stadiums.

Most prominent among these recreational facilities is the Dr. B. R. Ambedkar Stadium, which is located on the 60 Feet Road. It is built over the now-dried up Agarahara Darahalli Lake and has several sporting facilities, including a running track for walking, jogging and athletic events, a skating rink, a basketball court as well as facilities for kho-kho, kabaddi, cricket, badminton and taekwondo. It also plays host to Sports Day events of nearby schools which do not have a playground of their own.

Another prominent recreational space is the Nethaji Subhas Chandra Bose ground at Saneguruvanahalli. It is popularly known as "Bose Park" and is built over the now-dried up Saneguruvanahalli Lake. It has both a park with facilities for walking as well as play and gym equipment and an open ground with facilities for playing cricket, football and other outdoor sports.

There is a famous park in Sharada Colony known as the Sir M. Visvesvaraya Aalada Marada Udyanavana. It was famous for its banyan tree ("Aalada Marada" in Kannada), which was more than 500 years old and was home to hundreds of monkeys and birds and hence is also unofficially known as "Big Banyan Park" or "Monkey Park". The tree collapsed in 2009, however, efforts have since been made to translocate a banyan tree from another location to the park. The park has facilities for walking and also a children's recreational area.

Some of the other parks and open spaces in Basaveshwaranagar include the Motappa Park at Manjunatha Nagar, the Kuvempu ground which is an open space used for playing cricket, football and volleyball, the Swami Vivekananda Park near Shankar Mutt, the Udaya Ravi Park at Kirloskar Colony and the Subhas Chandra Bose Park at Agrahara Dasarahalli, to name a few. The latter park is said to be the first park in Bangalore to offer free Wi-Fi.

There is a single cinema hall in the locality, the Veerabhadreshwar Theatre at Kamalanagar near to the BEML Layout Bus Stop. It predominantly shows Kannada films.

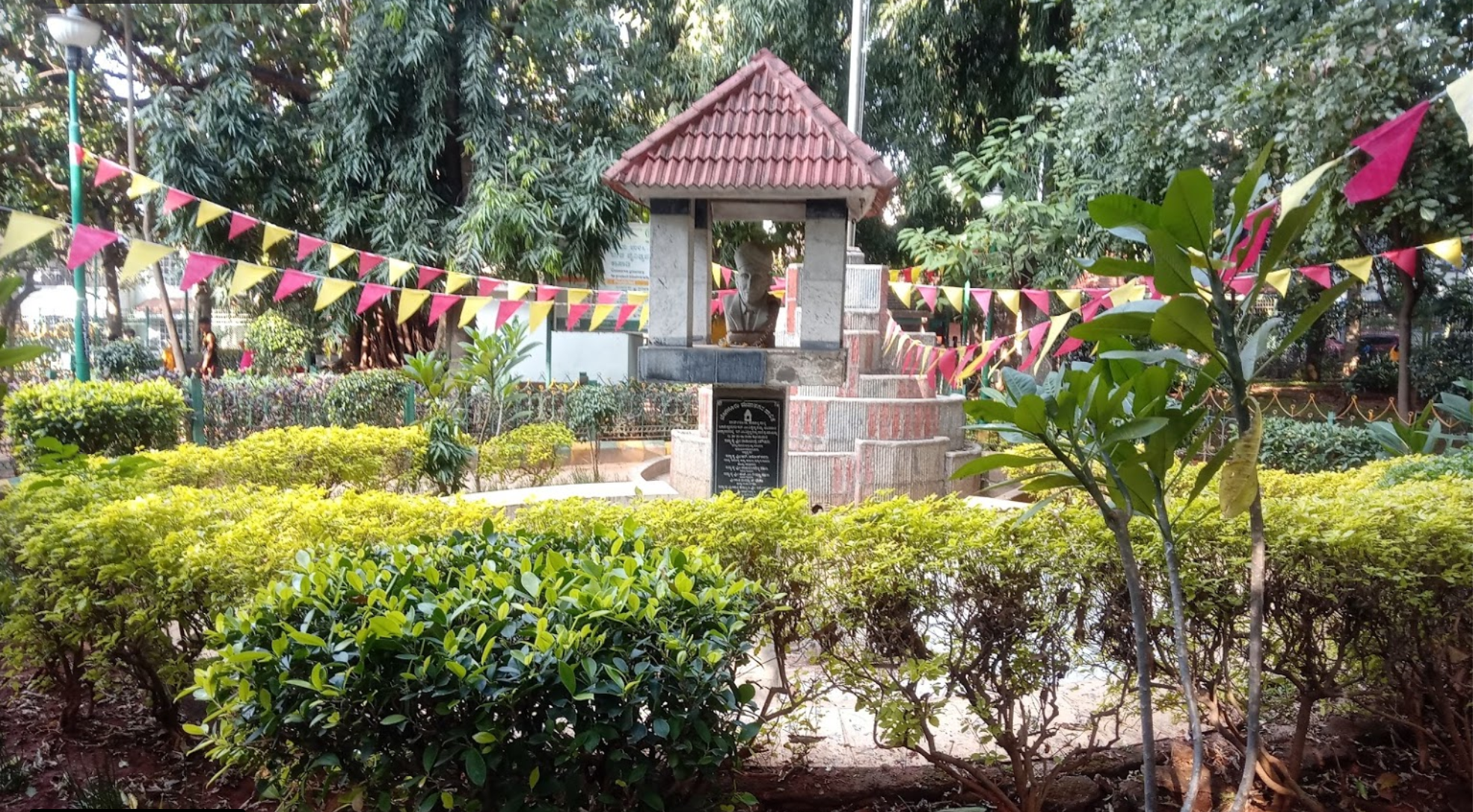
Sir M. Visveswaraya Aalada Marada Udyanavana (Monkey Park)

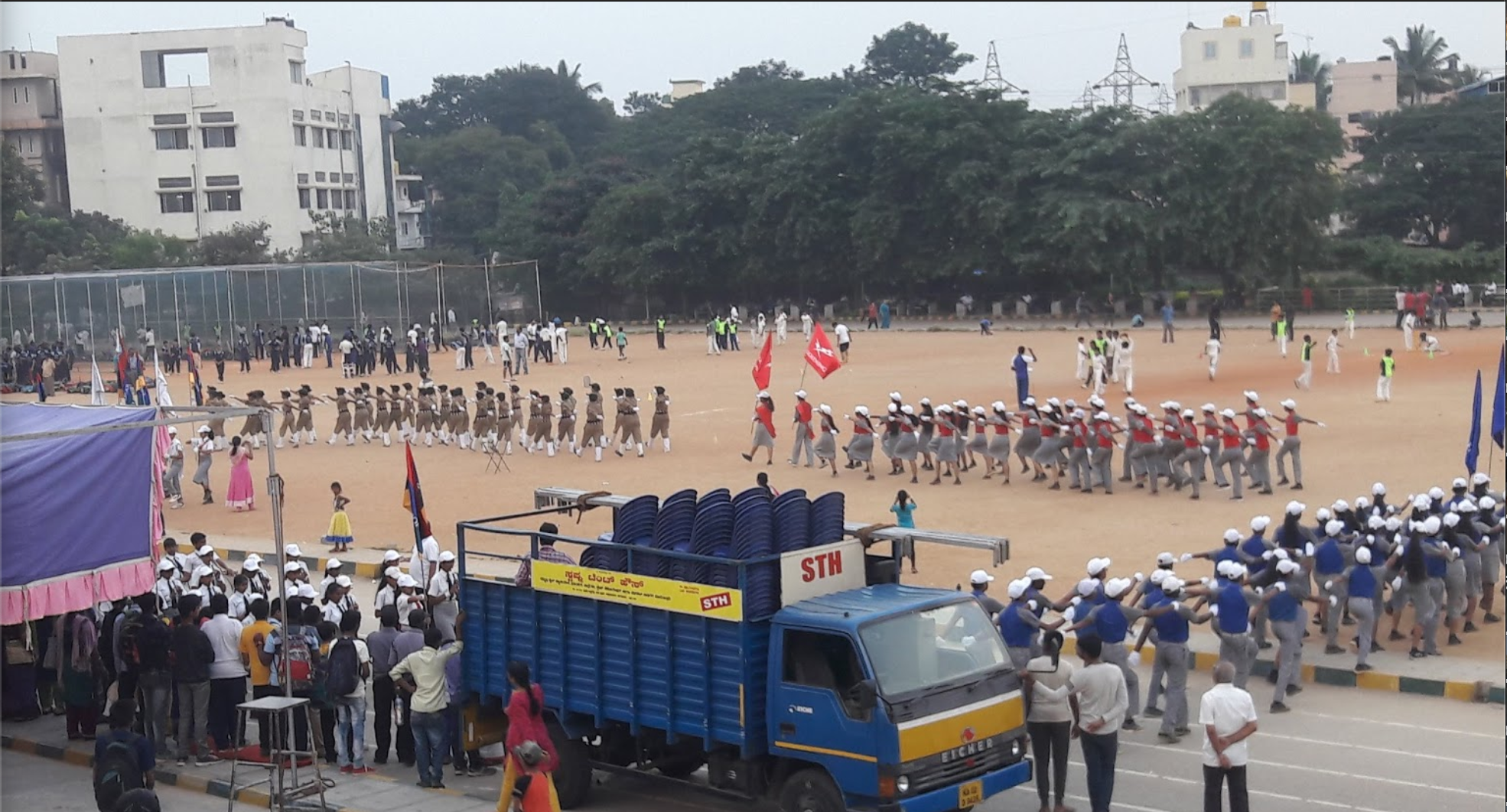
Dr. B. R. Ambedkar Stadium

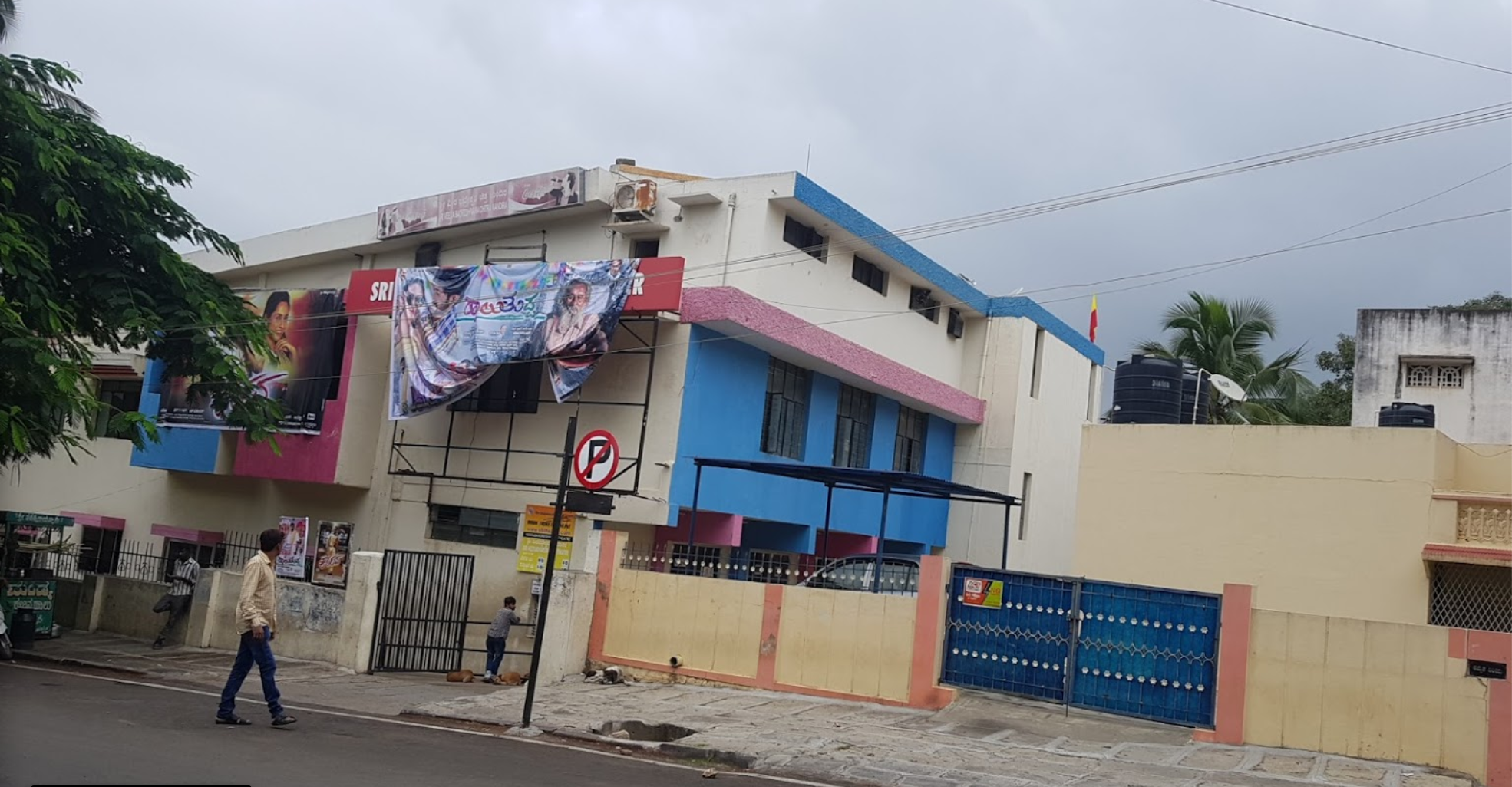
Veerabhadreshwara Theatre

== Hospitals ==
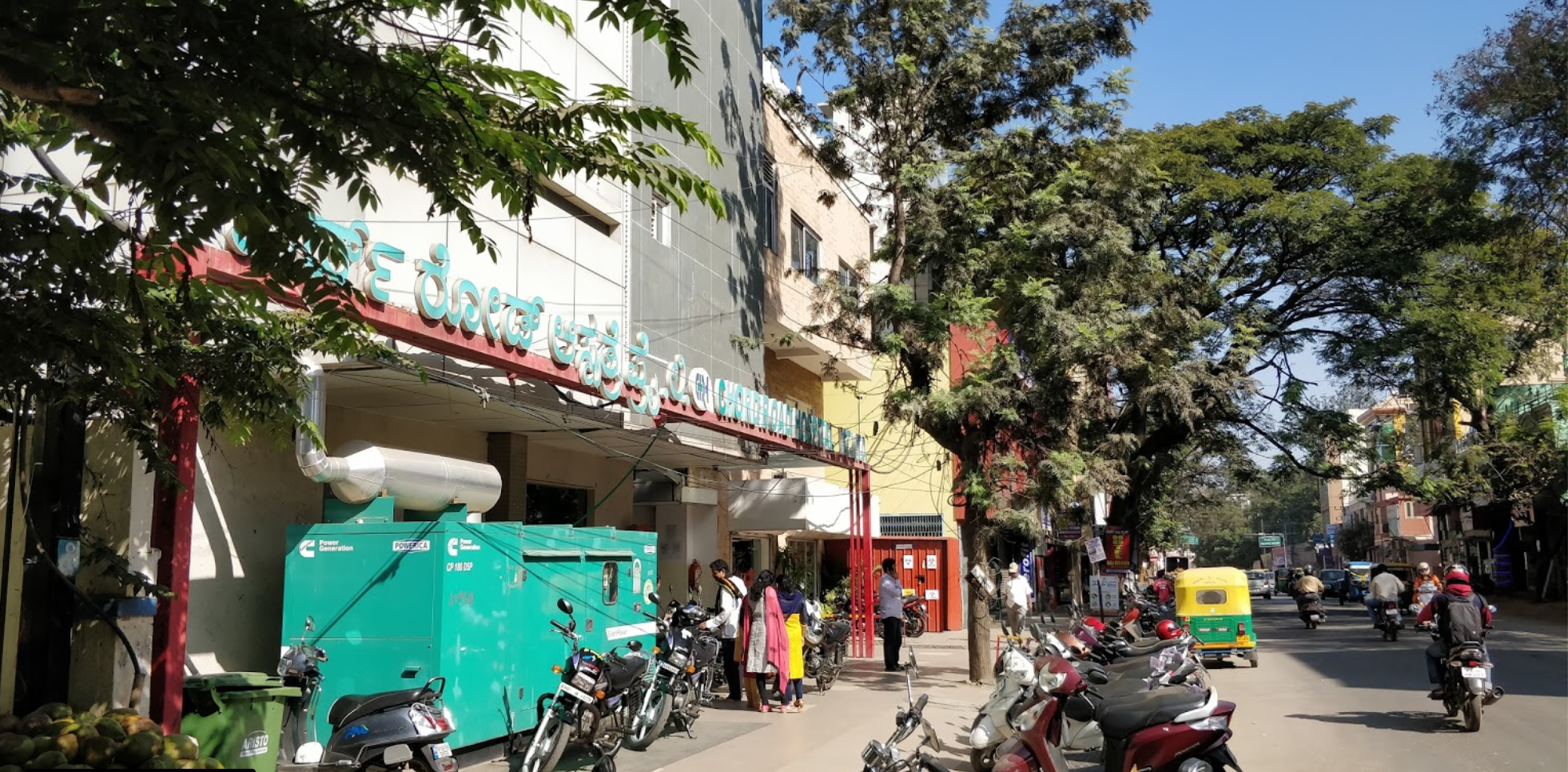
Chord Road Hospital

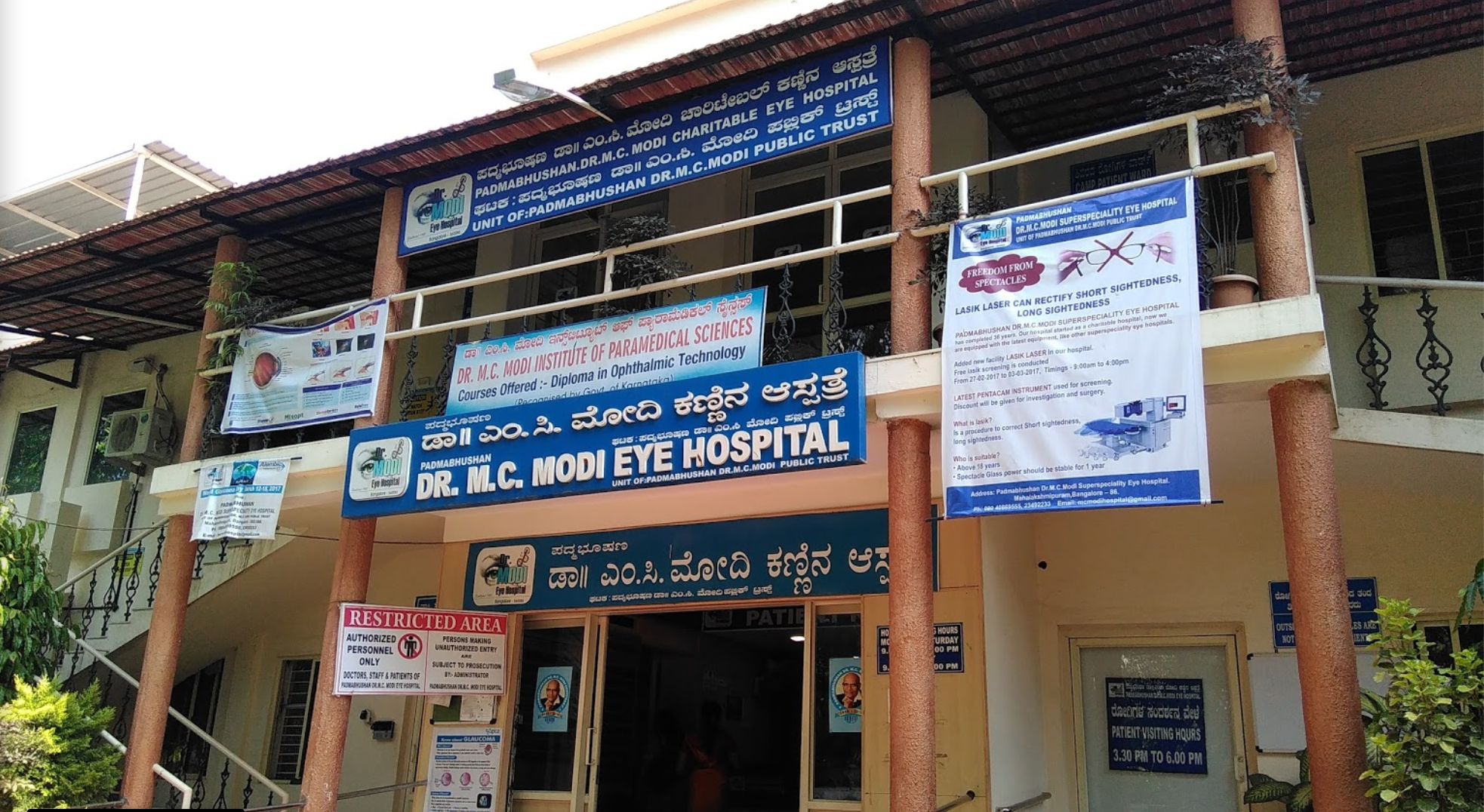
Dr. M. C. Modi Super Speciality Eye Hospital

Basaveshwaranagar has a wide range of medical specialties practiced through these prominent hospitals:

Hospital Name	Location	Speciality
Chord Road Hospital	Siddaiah Puranik Road	ENT
Dr. M. C. Modi Super Speciality Eye Hospital	Dr. M. C. Modi Hospital Road	Eye
Panacea Hospital	Siddaiah Puranik Road	Multi-speciality
Pristine Hospital	Dr. M. C. Modi Hospital Road	Multi-speciality
Shanbhag Hospital	60 Feet Road	OBG

Basaveshwaranagar has ample number of clinics and nursing homes across. The availability of medicine is fulfilled by the in house pharmacy of these hospitals and many prominent local pharmacies.

== Places of Worship ==
=== Temples ===
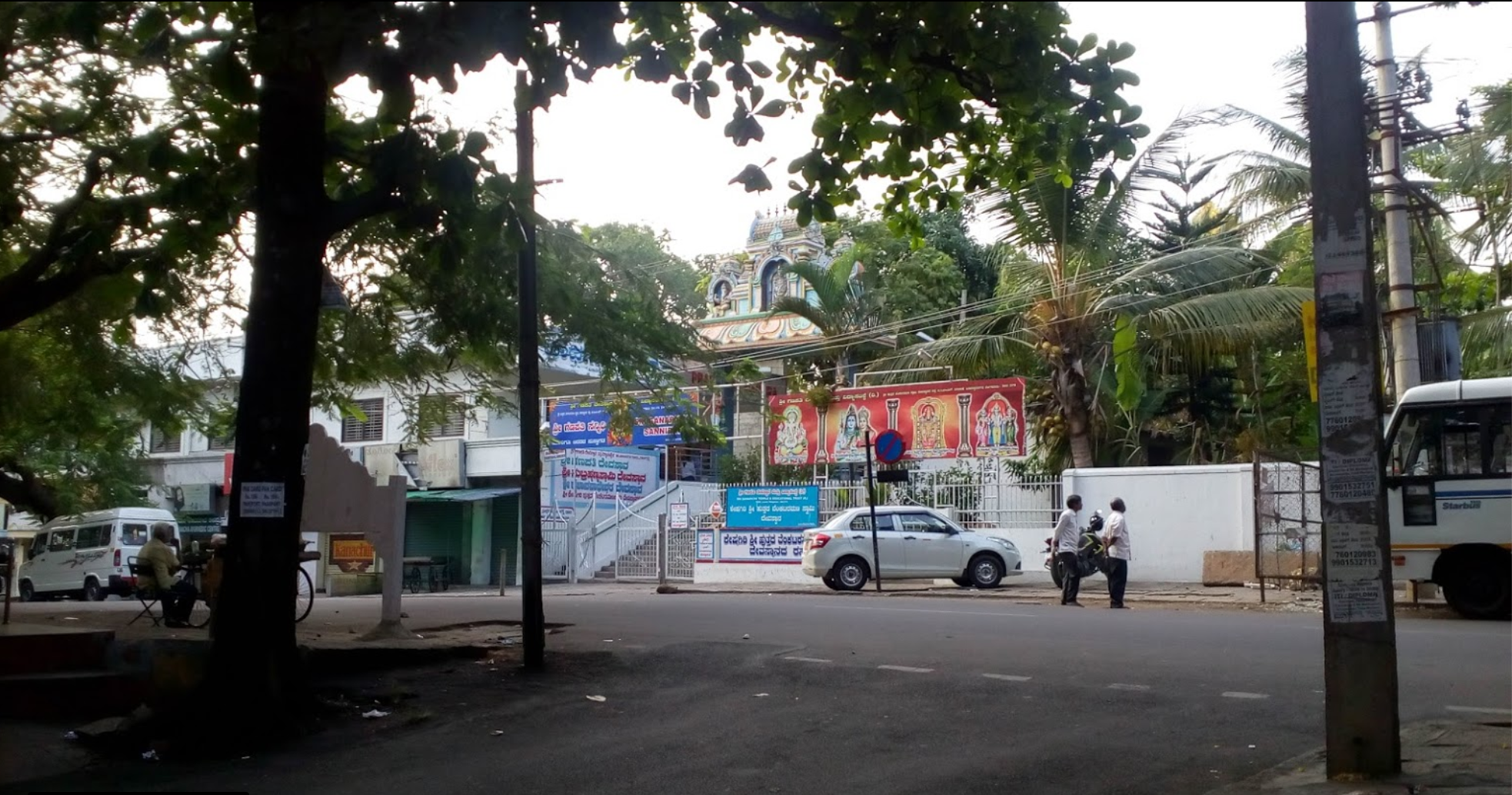
Sri Ganesha Temple, 8th Main, Basaveshwaranagar

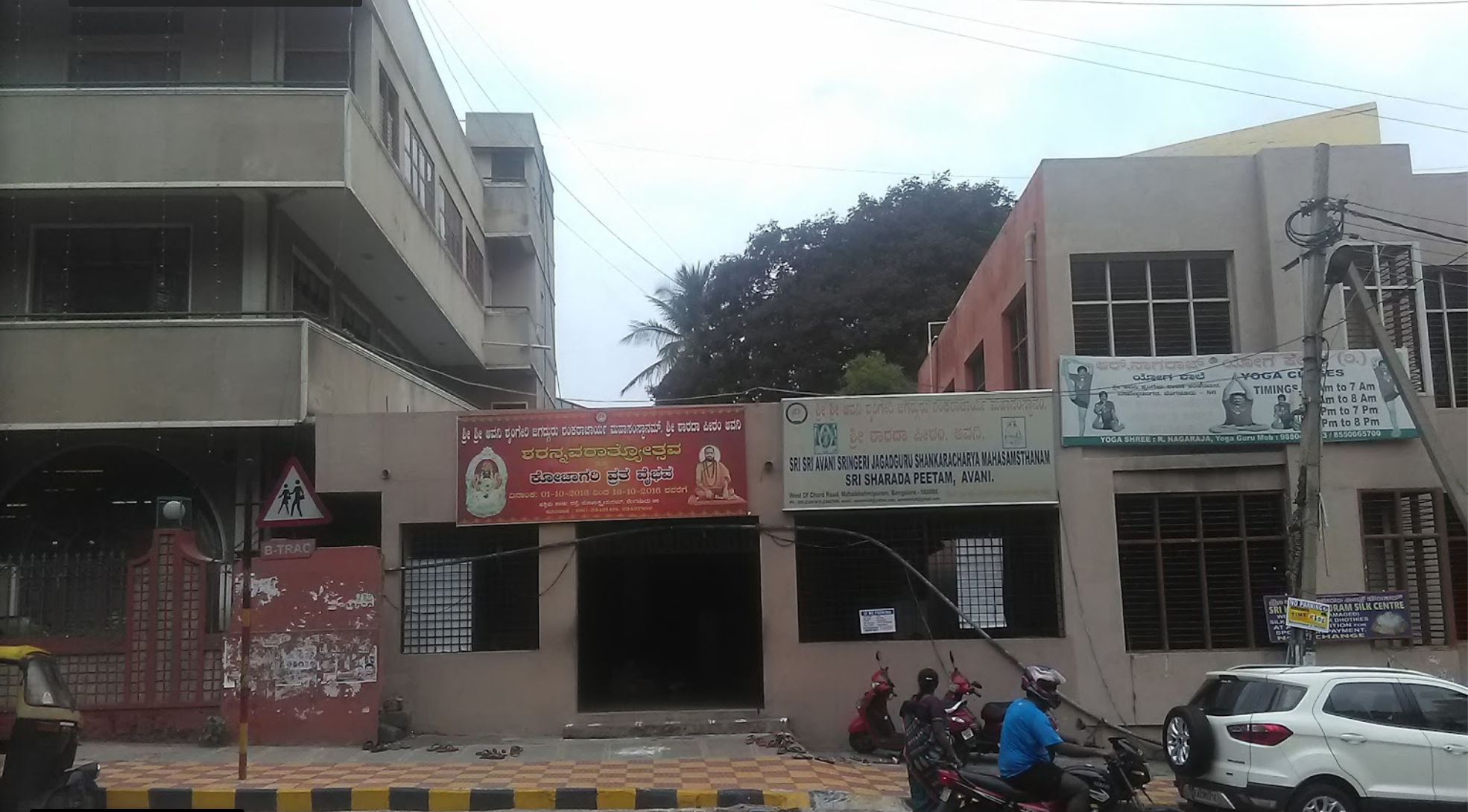
Sri Avani Sringeri Jagadguru Shankaracharya Mahasamsthanam

There are many Hindu temples in Basaveshwaranagar. The Sri Avani Sringeri Jagadguru Shankaracharya Mahasamsthanam, a breakaway mutt of the Sringeri Sharada Peetham, is located at Basaveshwaranagar, particularly in the sublocality of Bhimajyothinagar at the junction of Siddaiah Puranik Road, Kurubarahalli Main Road, Dr. M. C. Modi Hospital Road and the Mahalakshmi Layout 14th Main Road. This road junction and the surrounding area is commonly known as Shankar Mutt. Even the BBMP ward where the mutt is situated (Ward 75) takes the name of Shankar Mutt. The mutt premises includes a sma ll temple dedicated to Goddess Sri Sharadamba, a hall used for religious ceremonies and a sub post office with the pincode 560079.

Another notable temple is the Sri Ganapathi Temple located on the 8th Main Road, near BEML Layout Bus Stop. The temple, situated on a small hillock, includes a small temple complex with temples dedicated to Hindu gods of both the Shaiva and Vaishnavism tradition.

Other important temples in the locality include the Sri Lakshmi Narayana Swami Temple near Havanur Circle, the Sri Subramanya Swami Temple, the Sri Varasiddhi Vinayaka and the Sri Varapradha Lakshmivenkateshwara Temple at Kurubarahalli, the Sri Varasiddhi Vinayaka Temple at Saneguruvanahalli and the Sri Sai Baba Temple at Gruhalakshmi Layout.

=== Churches ===
Basaveshwaranagar has a very insignificant number of churches, but there is the Trinity Marthoma Church at Kamalanagar, a small church with the congregation being from the Malayalam-speaking Marthoma Christian community.

=== Mosques ===
There are a few mosques in Basaveshwaranagar such as the Makkah Masjid, Jamia Majid and Masjid-e-Nimra.

== Notable residents ==
- Ramachandra Gowda, BJP leader and former Medical Education Minister, Government of Karnataka
- S. Suresh Kumar, BJP leader, MLA for Rajajinagar (as of 2018) and current Primary and Secondary Education Minister, Government of Karnataka
