= Rajajinagar =

Rajajinagar Rajajinagar
- Neighborhood
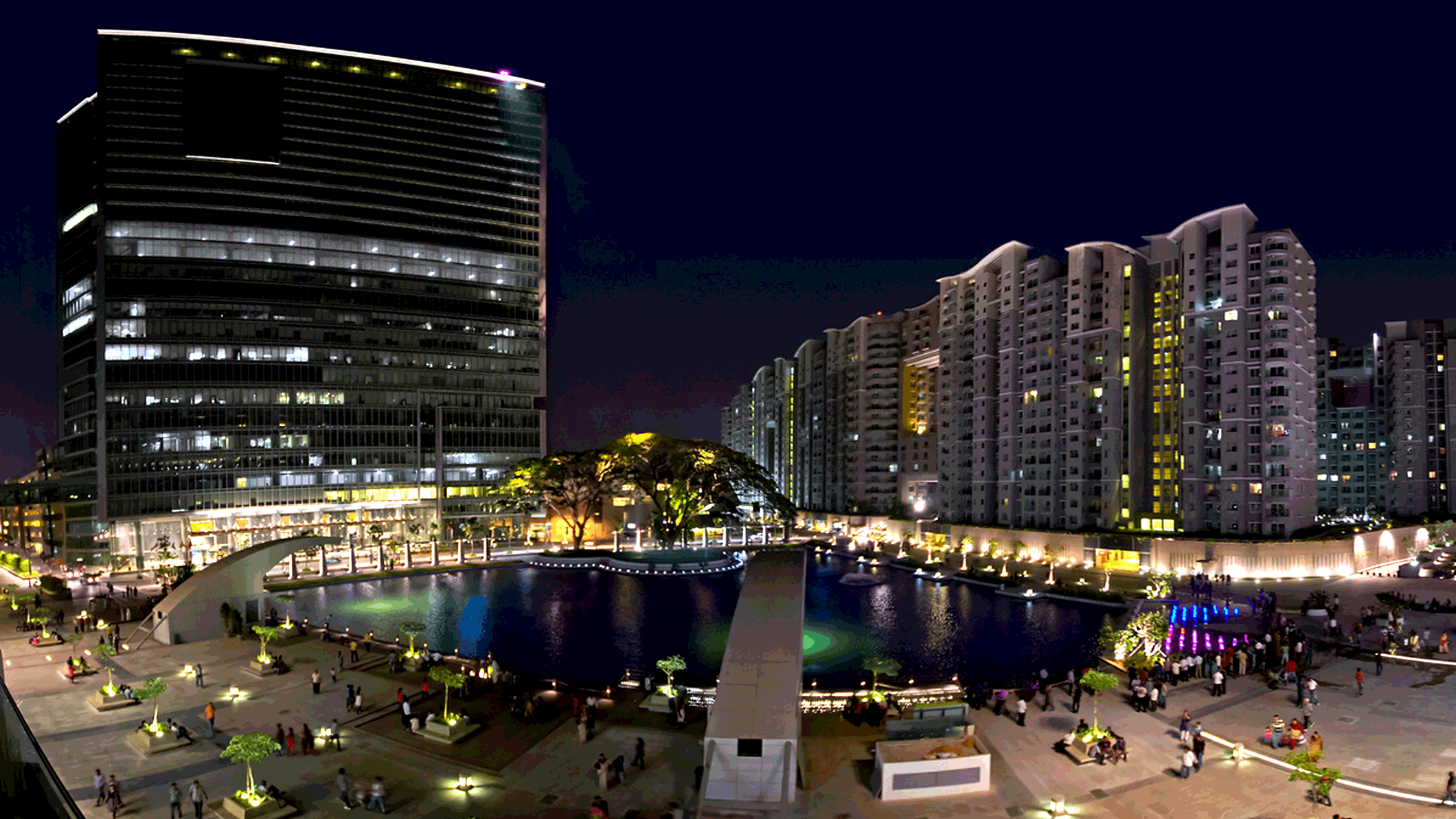
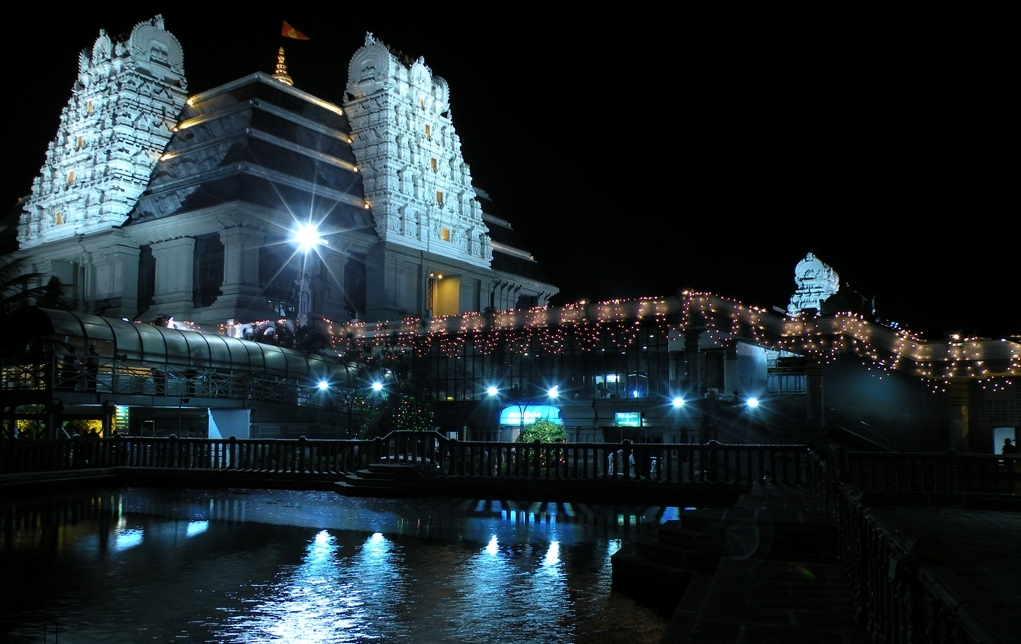
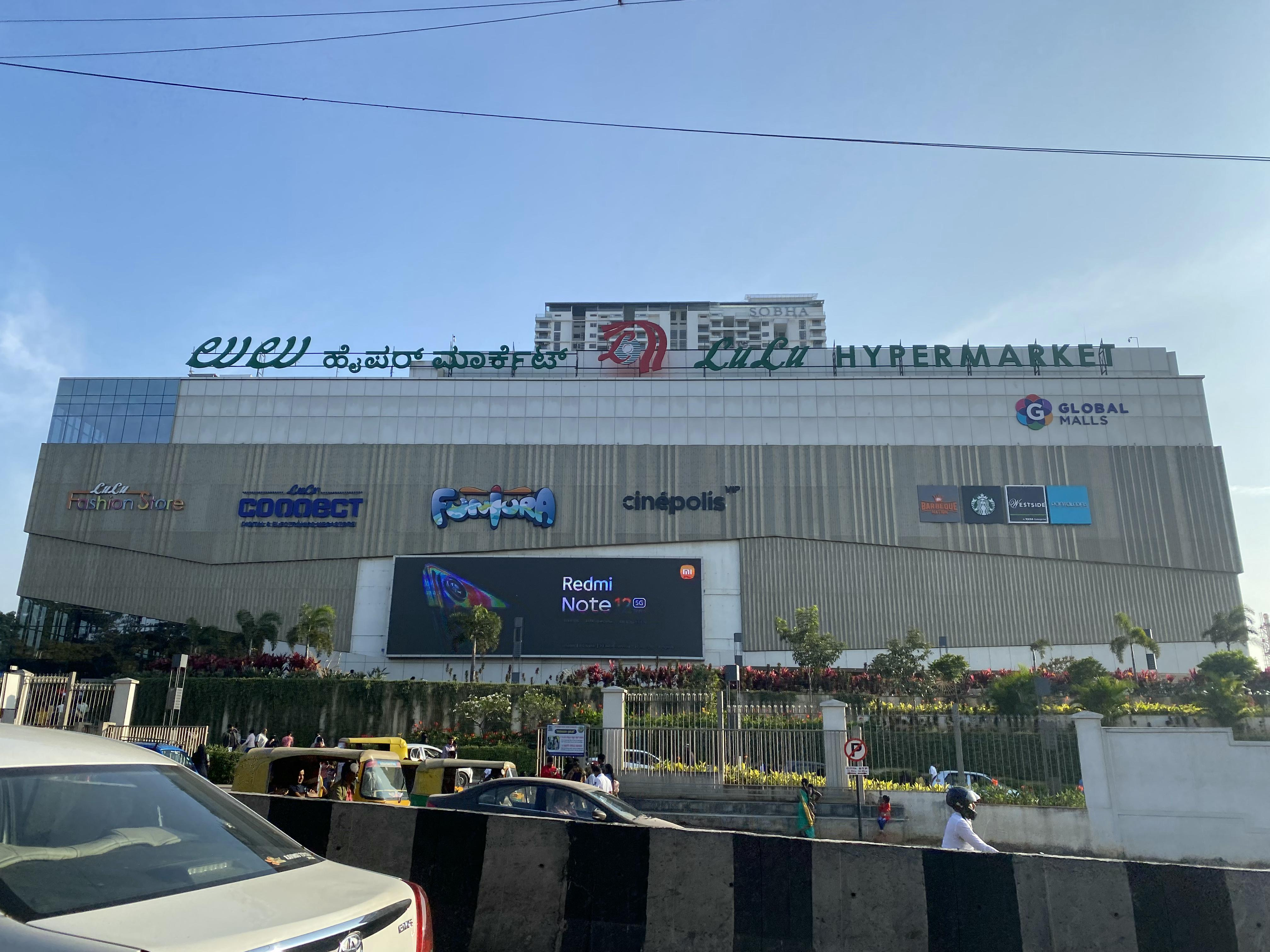
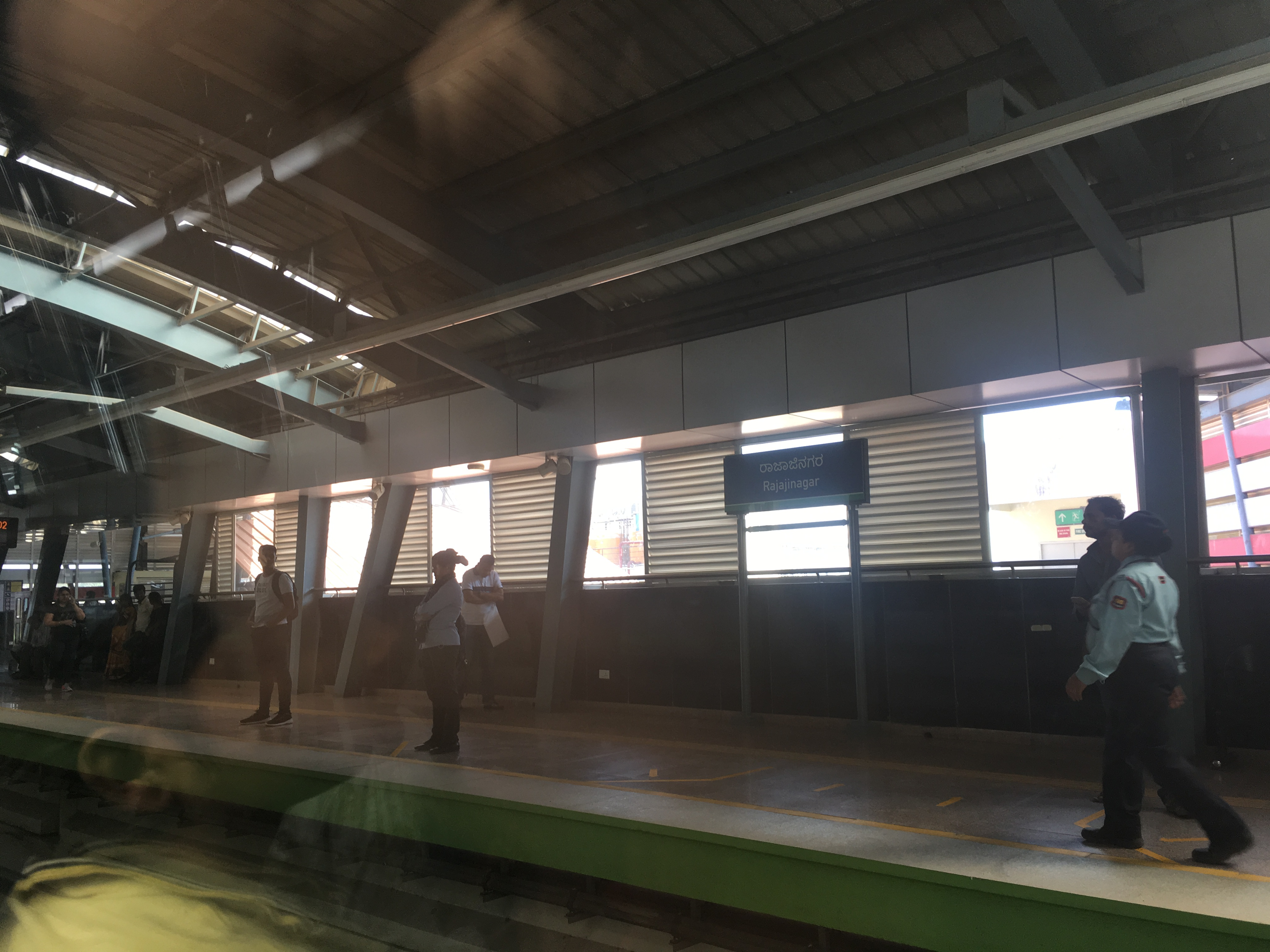
- (L–R, from top) World Trade Center within Brigade Gateway, ISKCON Temple, LuLu Hypermarket, Rajajinagar metro station

- Location within Bengaluru
- Coordinates: 12.97°N 77.57°E
- Country: India
- State: Karnataka
- City: Bangalore

Government
  - MLA: S. Suresh Kumar, BJP

Area
  - Metro: 800 km^{2} (310 sq mi)
- Elevation: 920 m (3,020 ft)

Population (2020)
  - Neighborhood: 227,517
  - Density: 32,387/km^{2} (83,880/sq mi)

Languages
  - Official: Kannada
- Time zone: UTC+5:30 (IST)
- PIN: 560010,560021,560044
- Vehicle registration: KA-02

Rajajinagar is a residential neighborhood and commercial hub in the west of Bangalore. It is one of the zones of BBMP. It is bordered by Basaveshwaranagar, Malleshwaram, Mahalakshmi Layout, Vijayanagara and Rajajinagar Industrial Suburb.

Inaugurated by Maharaja's of Mysuru Jayachamaraja Wadiyar, Rajajinagar Pillar on 3 July 1949. 70th birthday to C Rajagopalachari.

Named after statesman C. Rajagopalachari, a plaque in the Rajajinagar pillar indicates that 1,000 acres of land given for the locality was divided into industrial and housing areas. The former consisted of 140 acres for textiles, 220 acres for machinery, 100 acres for chemical plants and 40 acres for the food sector. About 4,000 housing plots were created in the remaining 500 acres. Rajajinagar was built at an estimated cost of Rs 50 lakh.

== Politics ==
BJP and INC are major players in Rajajinagar area. S. Suresh Kumar is the incumbent and 6 time MLA from Rajaji Nagar Assembly constituency

=== List of MLAs from Rajajinagar ===
Year	Member	Party
Until 1977: Constituency did not exist
1978	Mallur Ananda Rao	Janata Party
1983	M. S. Krishnan	Communist Party of India
1985	M. S. Krishnan	Communist Party of India
1989	K. Lakkanna	Indian National Congress
1994	S. Suresh Kumar	Bharatiya Janata Party
1999	S. Suresh Kumar	Bharatiya Janata Party
2004	N. L. Narendra Babu	Indian National Congress
2008	S. Suresh Kumar	Bharatiya Janata Party
2013	S. Suresh Kumar	Bharatiya Janata Party
2018	S. Suresh Kumar	Bharatiya Janata Party
2023	S. Suresh Kumar	Bharatiya Janata Party
