= Vijayanagar, Bengaluru =

Vijayanagar Vijayanagara
- Neighborhood
- Location within Bengaluru
- Coordinates: 12.96°N 77.54°E
- Country: India
- State: Karnataka
- Metro: Bangalore

Languages
  - Official: Kannada
- Time zone: UTC+5:30 (IST)
- PIN: 560040,560104
- Vehicle registration: KA-02, KA-41

Vijayanagar is a residential neighborhood in west Bangalore, India. It derives its name from the Vijayanagara Empire that flourished in South India during the 15th and 16th centuries. It is bound by Mysore Road and Magadi Road, with Chord Road cutting through. It is the north-western area in Bangalore. It is known for its well established roads, tree-lined streets, spacious parks and excellent metro connectivity.

Some neighbouring areas include Rajajinagar, Basaveshwara Nagar and Agrahara Dasarahalli in North, Binni Layout and Bapuji Nagar in East, Deepanjali Nagar and Chandra Layout in South, Nagarabhavi and Kamakshipalya in West.

Vijayanagar TTMC (Traffic and Transit Management Centre) is one of BMTC's major bus terminals in western Bengaluru. Located near the Attiguppe Metro Station on the Purple Line, it serves as an important interchange for city buses and metro services, making travel across Bengaluru convenient. The terminal also houses commercial spaces and supports high passenger volumes daily.

== Education ==
=== Schools ===
1. Blueline school
2. Cordial school
3. Euro kids Vijayanagar
4. NSVP convent
5. Pinewoods school
6. National English school
7. St John's School
8. St Michels Kids Kingdom Saraswathi Nagar
9. St Michael's English School
10. St Paul School
11. The New Cambridge School[ICSE]

Government First Grade College was established in 1985.

== Hospitals ==
- Precision Fertility Clinic - Dr

== Location ==
Vijayanagar is near R.V. College of Engineering, P.E.S. Institute of Technology, M. S. Ramaiah Institute of Technology, the Bangalore University, the National Law School of India University, Indian Institute of Fashion Technology and Dr. Ambedkar Institute of Technology.

It houses a large Public Library, which is one of the largest in Karnataka. It also boasts of a unique Karnataka Haridasa Scientific Research Centre housed in the spacious Vijaya Ranga building.

Many buses ply to different parts of Bangalore. Bus route series 61 is a direct bus from Vijayanagar to Kempegowda Bus Station/Majestic which is at a distance of around 5 km.

Namma Metro has 3 stations on its Purple Line (Namma Metro)

1. Balagangadharanatha Swamiji Station
  - provides easy access to Magadi Tollgate, Jai Muniroad circle, Vijayaganr Piple line areas
2. Vijayanagara Metro Station
  - provides easy access to Vijayangar, Vijayanagar 2nd Stage (Hampinagar) & Magadi Chordroad Layout (MC Layout)
3. Attiguppe Metro Station
  - provides easy access to Vijayanagar 2nd Stage(Hampinagar), Attiguppe, Chandra Layout, Subbanna Gargen localities

There is a well-maintained Swimming pool in Vijayanagar 2nd Stage (Hampinagar)

== Sub-localities ==
Vijayanagar East was formerly known as RPC Layout (Railway Parallel Chord Road Layout), as this locality is along the railway track. It has been recently renamed as Hampinagara, Vijayanagara 2nd Stage. Hampi was the capital of the Vijayanagara Empire.

Saraswatinagara and Govindrajnagara are two of the fastest-growing localities of Vijayanagara, which house some of the prominent people of Bengaluru. Bapujinagara, BCC Layout, Remco Layout, and Attiguppe are other sub-localities.
