= Orchids The International School, Bengaluru =

Chain of private schools in Karnataka, India

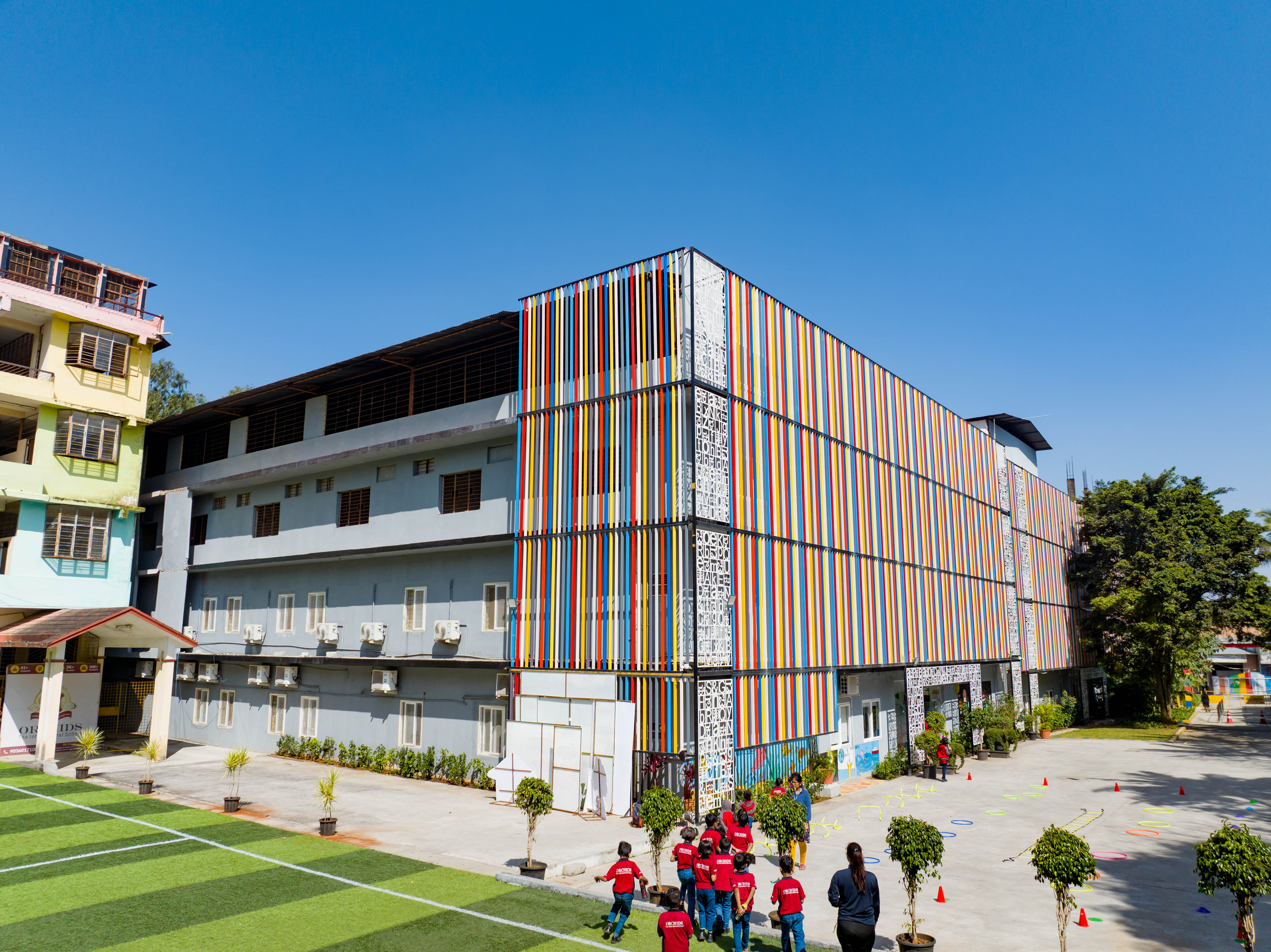
- A file photo of one of the Orchids School campuses in Bannerghatta in 2023
- Bengaluru, Karnataka; India

Information
- Established: 2013 (Nagarbhavi campus)
- Chairman: Jai Decosta
- Gender: Co-educational
- Classes: Nursery — Grade 12
- Language: English
- Campus type: Day school
- Affiliations: Central Board of Secondary Education, Indian Certificate of Secondary Education and Karnataka Secondary Education Examination Board
- Website: www.orchidsinternationalschool.com/bangalore-branches

Orchids The International School, Bengaluru (also known as ORCHIDS Bengaluru) is a co-educational chain of private K-12 schools operating multiple branches in Bengaluru, Karnataka, India.

As of 2025, the chain has around 30-32 branches in the city, with varying affiliations to the Central Board of Secondary Education, Indian Certificate of Secondary Education or the Karnataka Secondary Education Examination Board.

== History ==
In the 2010s, the ORCHIDS school chain started expanding in Bengaluru with multiple branches in neighbourhoods like Nagarabhavi, Mahalakshmi Layout, Haralur Road, Magadi Road, Mysore Road, Panathur and Sahakarnagar etc. The schools are run under trusts like AVV Educational Trust, Sri Radhakrishna Educational Trust, MB Shivakumar Seva Trust,Spandana Educational Trust, Ramanashree Pratishthana, Bangalore North Education Society, Udaya Education Society, Pragathi Charitable Trust and RT Nagar Educational Trust. After COVID-19, the network expanded to more than 30 branches in the city by the mid-2020s.

== Academics and curriculum ==
ORCHIDS schools follow curricula aligned with CBSE, ICSE, or state board standards, depending on the branch's affiliation. The schools offer STEM-related activities including coding, robotics, astronomy sessions, and project-based work. Students learn programming using Python and tools such as Pygame and OpenCV and participate in astronomy events such as “Go Cosmo – Universe Unleashed” and activities linked to National Space Day (India).

The schools provide two assessment levels in subjects such as Science, Social Science, and Mathematics in line with CBSE assessment reforms, with diagnostic tests and differentiated assignments. Reading and arithmetic skills are monitored using benchmarks referenced in the Annual Status of Education Report. Some branches include Kannada instruction alongside English in accordance with state bilingual education policies.

== Controversies ==
=== Affiliation and operations ===
Several branches including Nagarabhavi, Mahalakshmi Layout and Panathur were accused in 2022–2023 of claiming CBSE affiliation without approval. Protests by parents led to FIRs, notably in January 2023, for admitting students and teaching CBSE syllabus beyond permitted levels. The Karnataka education department ordered inspections across branches. The school stated that all branches had state board permissions; that CBSE affiliation processes take 3–4 years and were delayed by COVID-19; that admissions were transparent; and that currently all those schools have obtained full affiliations.

=== Student fees ===
In December 2024, the Mysore Road branch was accused of allegedly confining students over unpaid fees, triggering complaints to education and child protection authorities. The school denied the allegations.

=== Regulatory action ===
Multiple branches received notices, and some were temporarily shut or faced first information reports for unauthorized operations. The school stated it re-applied for permissions, relocated students where needed and emphasised transparency in admissions.

== Gallery ==
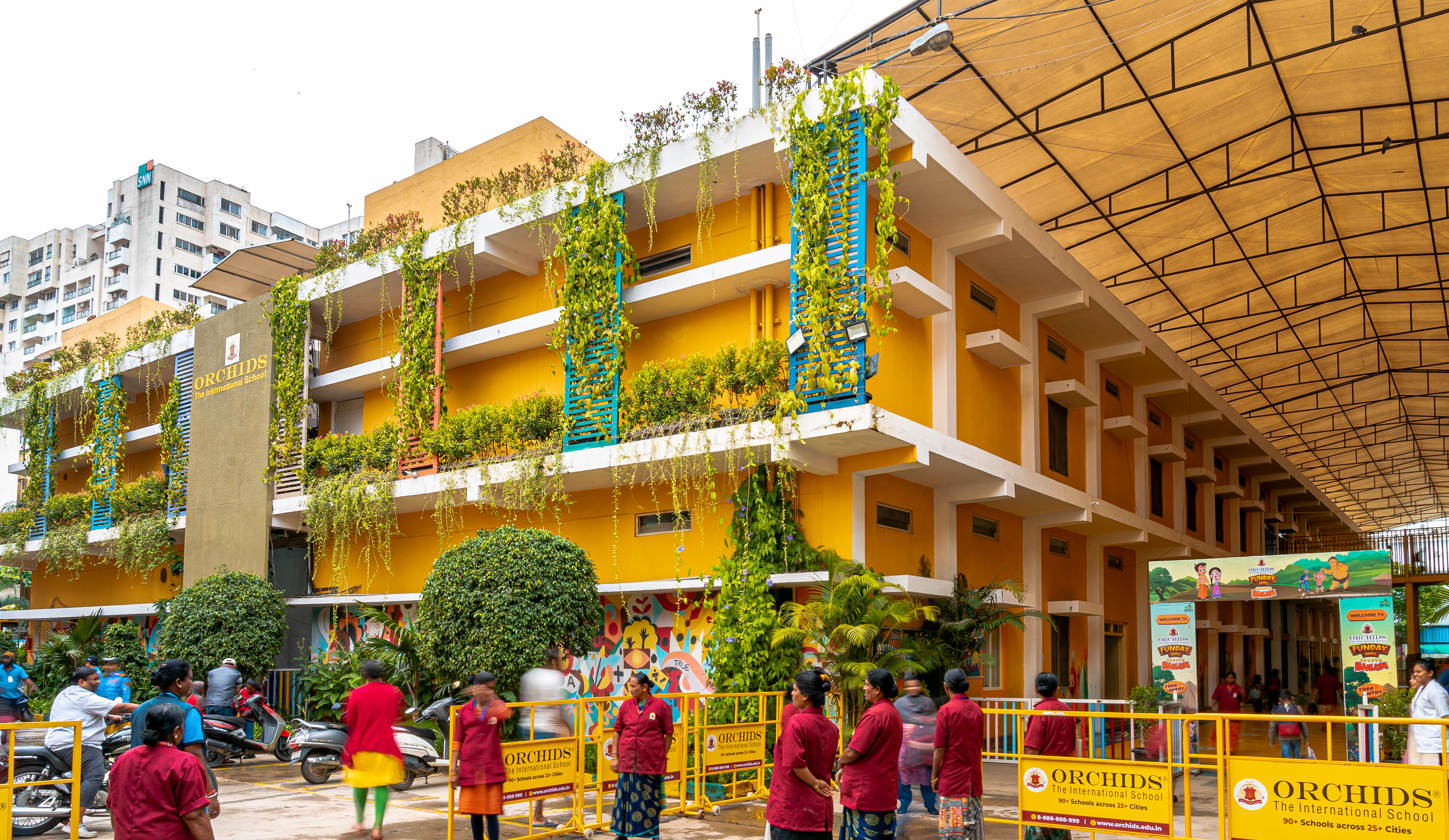
BTM Layout campus

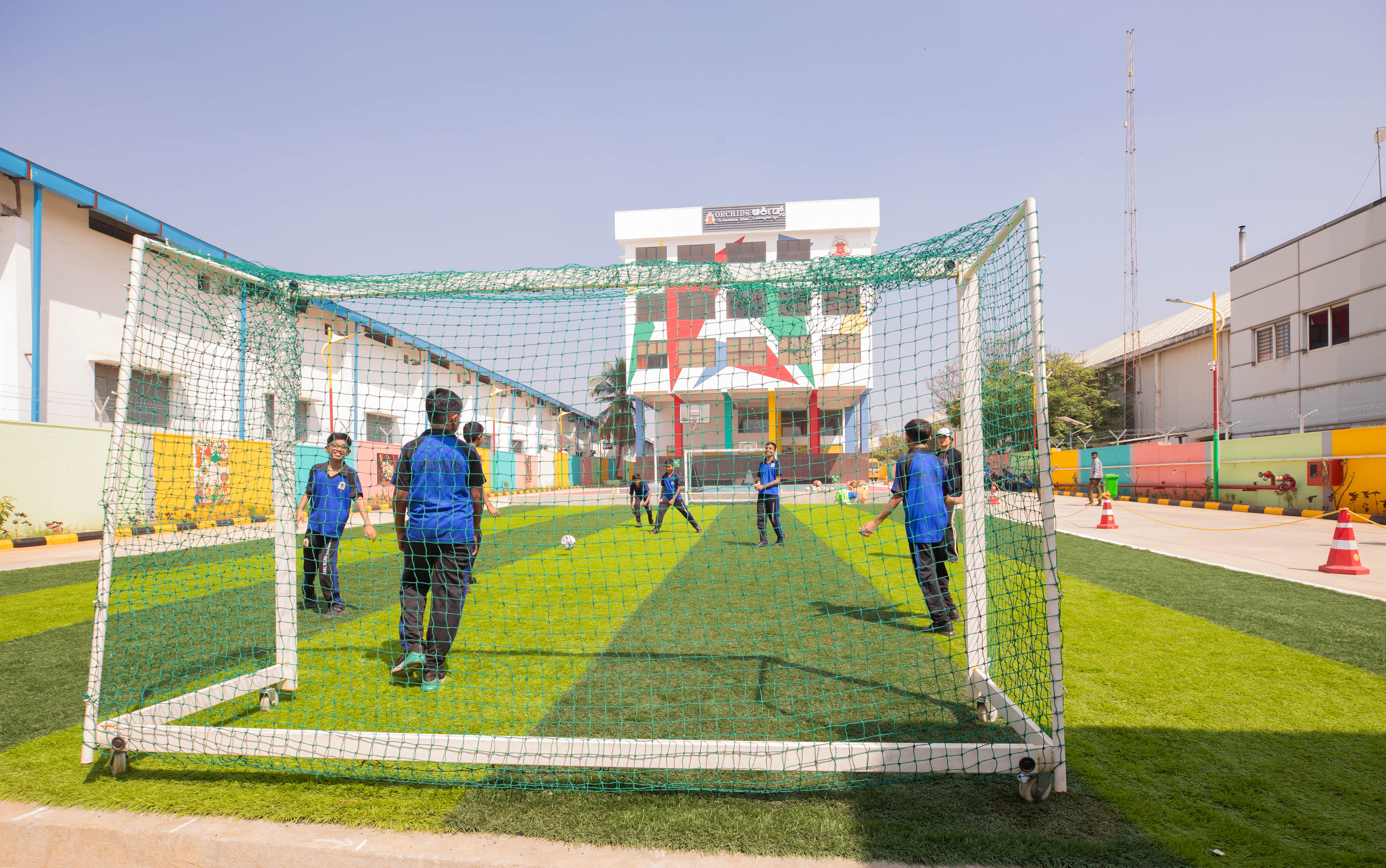
Makali campus

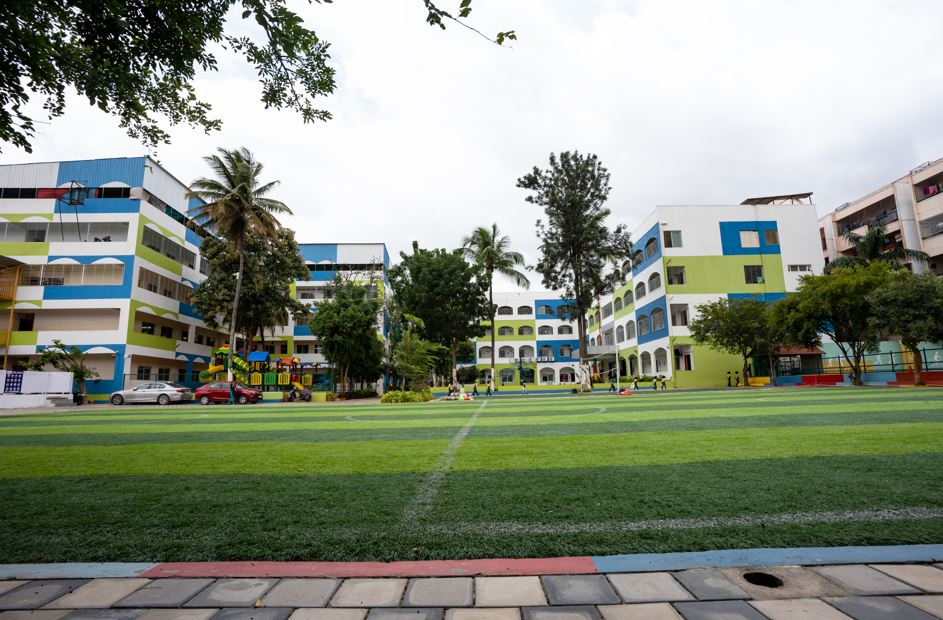
Whitefield campus

== Notes ==
=== Campuses ===
Locations of approximately 38 Orchids The International School campuses in Bengaluru (numbered legend provided)

Orchids The International School campuses in Bengaluru (precise locations where available; numbered legend in 3 columns below)
1 OIS Jakkur
2 OIS Yelahanka CBSE
3 OIS Yelahanka ICSE
4 OIS Sahakar Nagar
5 OIS Hesaraghatta Road
6 OIS Hennur Road
7 OIS Horamavu
8 OIS Ramamurthy Nagar
9 OIS Mahadevapura
10 OIS Whitefield
11 OIS Kadugodi
12 OIS CV Raman Nagar
13 OIS Panathur
14 OIS Cheemasandra
15 OIS Haralur
16 OIS Rayasandra
17 OIS Sarjapur Road
18 OIS HSR Layout
19 OIS Marathahalli
20 OIS JP Nagar area
21 OIS BTM Layout
22 OIS Arekere
23 OIS Bannerghatta
24 OIS Boarding School Kanakapura Road
25 OIS Mysore Road
26 OIS Kengeri
27 OIS Magadi Road
28 OIS Kumbalgodu
29 OIS Nagarbhavi
30 OIS Vijayanagar
31 OIS Mahalakshmi Layout
32 OIS Makali
33 OIS Jalahalli
34 OIS Rajajinagar
35 OIS Pre Primary Wing in Sahakar Nagar
36 OIS Pre Primary Wing in BTM
37 OIS Pre Primary Wing in Vijayanagar
38 OIS Majestic
