= Nandini Layout =

Nandini Layout Mahalakshmi Layout Extension Singapore Dollar Layout
- Locality
- Location within Bengaluru
- Coordinates: 13°00′41″N 77°32′12″E
- Country: India
- State: Karnataka
- District: Bengaluru Urban
- Metro: Bengaluru
- Zone: West
- Ward: 43
- Established: 1980's
- Founder: BDA
- Elevation: 878 m (2,881 ft)

Languages
  - Official: Kannada
- Time zone: UTC+5:30 (IST)
- PIN: 560096
- Telephone code: 91-80
- ISO 3166 code: IN-KA
- Vehicle registration: KA-02
- Lok Sabha: Bangalore North
- Vidhan Sabha: Mahalakshmi Layout

Nandini Layout was a village before it was converted into a residential area and is located in west Bangalore. It is 7 km from Majestic. It is famous for parks. Adjacent to the Main Bus stand is the Nandini Layout Central Park, also known as Circular Park, as it is circular in shape and is concentrically surrounded by roads. Nandini Layout is surrounded by Peenya, Kurubarahalli, Mahalakshmi Layout and Yeswanthpur. It is known as the Ooty of Bangalore for its trees and greenery. Moreover, the number of parks in the area is so much so that it remains famous for the same. Nandini Layout's connection to Singapore is more than just a passing comparison, it was a foundational vision of its creator. Often referred to by locals as "Singapore Colony" or "Gundu Rao Colony," the area was specifically modeled after urban planning seen in Singapore during the 1980s.

The advent of the Namma Metro Green Line was a turning point for the neighborhood. While the layout doesn't have a station in its immediate center, the nearby Mahalakshmi and Sandal Soap Factory stations have drastically reduced commute times to Majestic (the city’s central transit hub) and South Bengaluru. Internally, the layout is organized into "blocks." Each block functions almost like a mini-village, with its own local markets, temples, and small parks. The roads are generally wider than those in older "pete" areas, though the hilly terrain makes for some steep climbs that give local morning walkers a rigorous workout.

The layout was the brainchild of the late former Chief Minister of Karnataka, R. Gundu Rao. After a visit to Singapore in the early 1980s, he was so impressed by the city-state's organized residential blocks and lush greenery that he dreamt of developing a model layout in Bengaluru that captured that same charm. The centerpiece of the layout is the Nandini Layout Central Park (Circular Park). The design features concentric roads radiating from this green core, an impressive feat of geometric planning that includes eight concentric rings. Long before Bengaluru was struggling with rapid urbanization, Nandini Layout was designed to prioritize trees and parks. This early commitment to a "green lung" reflects Singapore's own transformation into a "City in Nature". Much like Singapore’s HDB (Housing & Development Board) estates, Nandini Layout was envisioned as a self-contained colony. In its early years, bulk blocks were purchased by over 20 public sector undertakings—including nationalised banks and insurance companies—to house their employees, creating a stable, close-knit community of working professionals and senior citizens.

Like any aging urban area, Nandini Layout faces its share of challenges. The very hills that make it beautiful also make it difficult for modern drainage systems during extreme rainfall. Furthermore, as the city grows, there is increasing pressure to convert old independent bungalows into multi-story apartment complexes. While this brings more people and modern amenities, there is a lingering fear among long-term residents that the "Ooty" charm might eventually be lost to over-densification. The local temples, such as the Sri Lakshmi Narasimha Swamy Temple, serve as more than just religious sites; they are community centers where people gather for music performances, social work, and local gossip. During festivals like Ganesh Chaturthi or Kannada Rajyotsava, the streets come alive with decorations, processions, and community feasts (Dasoha). The soul of Nandini Layout is its people. Historically, it has been a stronghold for the Kannada-speaking middle class, including government employees, educators, and retired professionals. This demographic has fostered a culture that prioritizes festivals, literature, and classical arts.

Over the decades, Nandini Layout has evolved into an educational hub. It caters to a diverse demographic, offering schools that follow various curricula. Institutions like Nandini Public School and Jnanavahini Public School have been staples of the community for generations, educating thousands of local children. The transition from St. Paul’s English School to Presidency School is a defining chapter in Nandini Layout’s history, marking the evolution of one of the area's first major educational institutions into a sprawling academic group. The Nandini Layout branch (now known as PSNLO) transitioned into a co-educational day school affiliated with the CISCE (ICSE) board.

In terms of healthcare, West Bangalore has two options nearby; Manipal Hospital (Yeshwanthpur) and Sparsh Hospital, which are open 24/7. Manipal Hospital is the second largest healthcare group in India, and has many awards regarding the hospital;

- Best Hospital for Medical Value in 2020 - Awarded by Newsweek for the hospital's exceptional healthcare services provided at an affordable cost.
- Excellence in Patient Care in 2019 - Awarded by Global Health & Travel Awards for the hospital's exceptional patient care services and for being at the forefront of medical innovation.
- Best Hospital in Cardiology in 2018 - Awarded by Times Health for the hospital's advanced cardiology care services and expertise in complex heart surgeries.
- Best Hospital in Oncology in 2017 - Awarded by Economic Times for the hospital's advanced oncology care services and expertise in cancer treatments.
- Best Hospital for Medical Tourism in 2016 - Awarded by India Medical Travel Awards for the hospital's focus on providing international patients with excellent medical treatments and personalized care.

Though, many customers criticize that basic scans cost a lot more on average than in other hospitals, along with hidden costs, though the treatment is known to be better at Manipal Hospital than other hospitals in South India. Although, this is contrary to the Best Hospital for Medical Value in 2020, proclaiming the hospital's services were affordable.

Sparsh Hospital - like Manipal Hospital (Yeshwanthpur) is open 24/7, and is a local hospital chain that has an expertise in Orthopedics. Here is how it ranks compared to other hospitals in the South India region;

- Specialty Ranking - In the Outlook-NEB Research Hospital Rankings, SPARSH Yeshwanthpur is ranked as the #1 Best Orthopedic Hospital in Bengaluru.
- Multi-Specialty Ranking - The same independent survey ranks it as the #2 Best Multi-Specialty Hospital in Bengaluru and the #5 Best across all of South India.
- Safety & Infection Control: In 2026, the branch was declared the National Winner by CAHO (Consortium of Accredited Healthcare Organizations) for national excellence in infection control and patient safety.
- Patient Volume & Rating - It has around 4.7/5 stars on Google across nearly 18,000 reviews, as of September 17, 2026.

Many patients criticize the expensive food choices and the volume of people - overcrowding.

While primarily residential, the outskirts of Nandini Layout are buzzing with commercial activity. It serves as a residential base for many who work in the Peenya Industrial Area, one of the largest industrial estates in Southeast Asia. This proximity creates a unique economic synergy where the quiet streets of the layout provide a sanctuary for those working in the high-decibel manufacturing sector. For leisure, residents don't have to travel far. The Orion Mall and Brigade Gateway complex are just a short drive away, offering high-end retail, cinemas, and dining. However, most locals still prefer the "Nandini Layout Main Road" for their daily needs. Here, traditional "Kirana" stores coexist with modern supermarkets, and street food vendors serve up some of the best masala puri and filter coffee in the city.
