= Mahalakshmi Layout =

Mahalakshmi Layout Mahalakshmipuram
- neighborhood
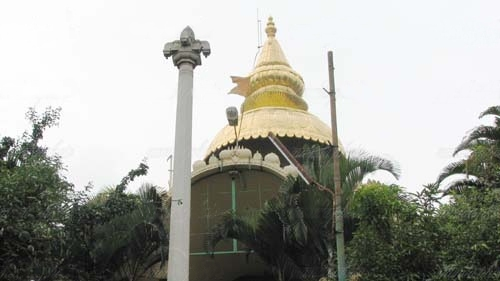
- Nickname: Temple Layout
- Location within Bengaluru
- Coordinates: 13°01′00″N 77°32′18″E
- Country: India
- State: Karnataka
- District: Bengaluru Urban
- Metro: Bengaluru

Area
  - Total: 1.46756 km^{2} (0.56663 sq mi)

Languages
  - Official: Kannada
- Time zone: UTC+5:30 (IST)
- PIN: 560086
- Telephone code: 080
- Vehicle registration: KA 02

Mahalakshmi Layout, also known as Mahalakshmipuram, is a neighborhood in northwest Bengaluru, India. It is near Rajajinagara, Basaveshwaranagara and Yeshwanthpura. Together with Nandini Layout, Kurubarahalli and Nagapura, it is the third largest residential area in Bengaluru.

Prasanna Veeranjaneya Temple with Lord Hanuman as the presiding deity is popular in the area.

== Educational institutions ==
Mahalakshmi layout has a considerable number of educational institutions, both at the primary/secondary education and higher education level.

The area consists of renowned colleges and colleges.

- BGS World School
- BGS Pre-university College
- BGS Institute of Management
- Orchids International School Mahalakshmi Layout
- Basaveshwara Aided High School
- Max Muller Public School
- St. Paul's High School
- SG International Public School

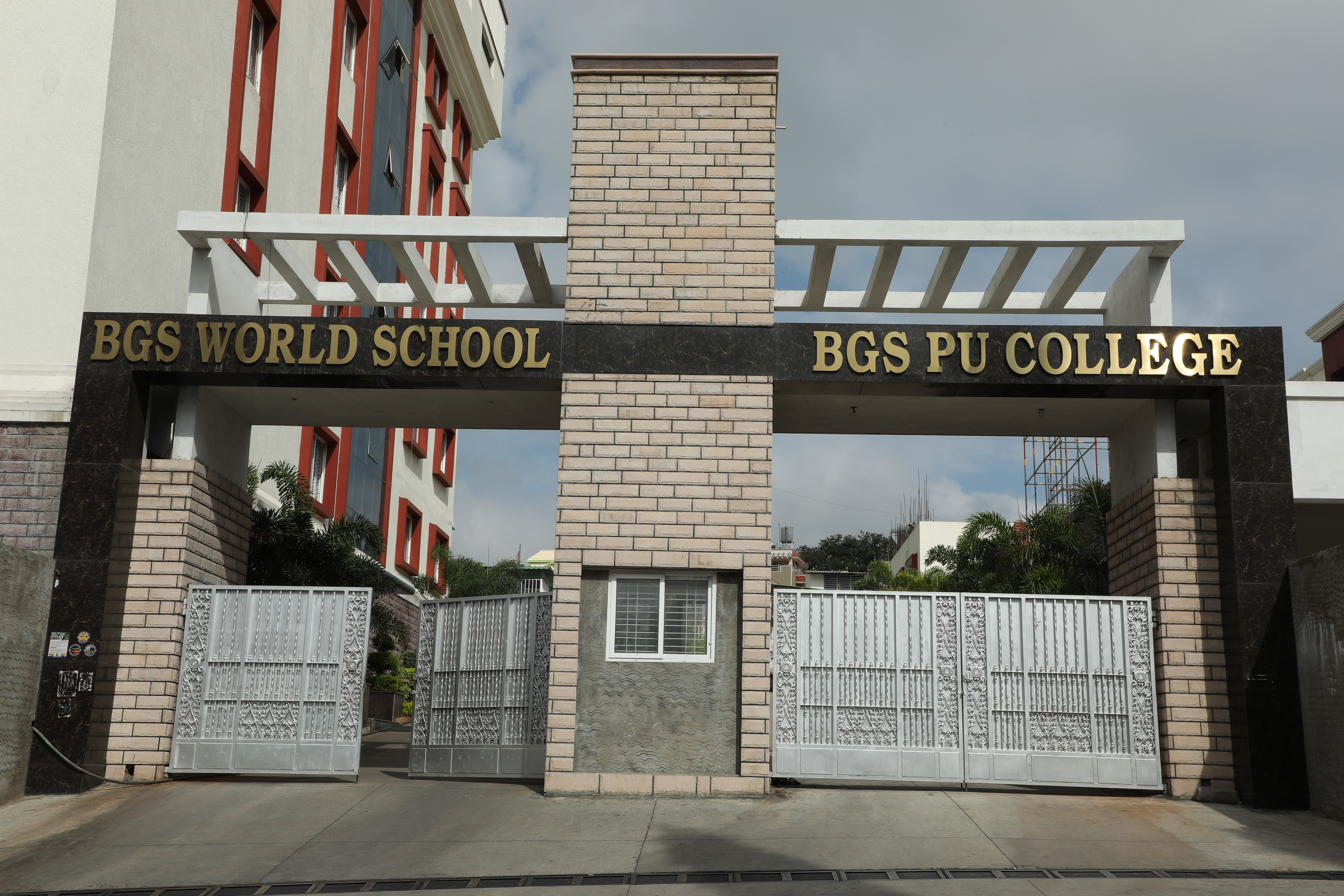
PU COLLEGE

The area consists of renowned skin clinic

- Skin Xperts Super specialty skin Hair and Laser Clinics(Bangalore Global Medical Foundation)
- Dental Xperts is common man's affordable Dental clinics
- Health xperts is super speacilty day care clinics
- Dermpath xperts skin hair and nail pathology centre
