= Indian Institute of Fashion Technology =

Fashion school affiliated with Bangalore University

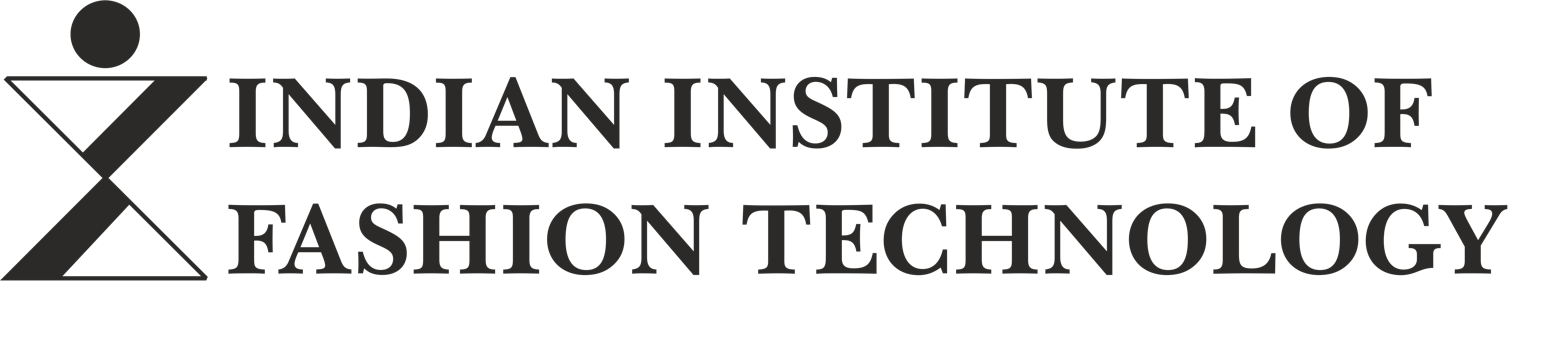
- Motto: Glamorous Careers, Glorious Future
- Type: Private
- Established: 2001
- Affiliations: Bangalore University, KSWU
- Chairperson: Rajeswari Vedhagiri
- Location: Bengaluru, India
- Website: www.iiftbangalore.com

Indian Institute of Fashion Technology also known as IIFT was established in the year 2001 in Bangalore, Karanataka by BVG Educational Trust. The branches of Indian Institute of Fashion technology are spread across Karnataka. The Fashion Institute provides various courses in the field of Fashion.

Indian Institute Of Fashion Technology entered Limca Book Of Records in 2011 for displaying most designs at Fashionite 2010. The Institute participates in various events including Charity as well as Fashion Weeks. Indian Institute of Fashion Technology was the Educational partner for Bangalore Fashion Week 2020. IIFT College bagged the 1st rank & 8th rank in the year 2012 and the 8th rank in the year 2013 in the Bangalore University for B.Sc Fashion and Apparel Design.

== Academics ==
The Institute offers following courses.

1. Diploma in Fashion Design & Boutique Management
2. Diploma in Fashion Communication & Fashion Journalism
3. BSc in Fashion & Apparel Design
4. Masters in Fashion Management
5. Certification Course in Pattern Making & Draping
6. Advanced Fashion Designing & Illustration Course
7. Weekend Diploma in Fashion Designing
8. Fashion Designing Course
9. Digital Marketing Course
10. Fashion Designing Diploma Courses in Jaipur
11. Fashion Designing Courses in Jaipur
12. Jaipur School of Design
13. fashion designing institute in jaipur

== Affiliations & Collaborations ==
Indian Institute of Fashion Technology has collaborated with Karnataka State Women’s University for its PG Diploma and Diploma In Fashion Design & Boutique Management as well as Masters in Fashion Management Courses. The Institute is also affiliated to Bangalore University and Recognized by Government of Karnataka to conduct BSc Degree course in Fashion & Apparel Design. Apart from these, Indian Institute of Fashion Technology has also been recognized by Department of Handlooms & Textiles.

== Fashionite ==
Every Year Indian Institute of Fashion Technology organizes a Fashion Show called Fashionite where students get to show their designs in front of proclaimed audience.
