= List of speakers of the Karnataka Legislative Assembly =

Presiding officer of the lower house of the Karnataka Legislature of India

Speaker of Karnataka Legislative Assembly
- Karnāṭaka Vidhāna Sabheya Adhyakṣaru
- Emblem of Karnataka

- Flag of India

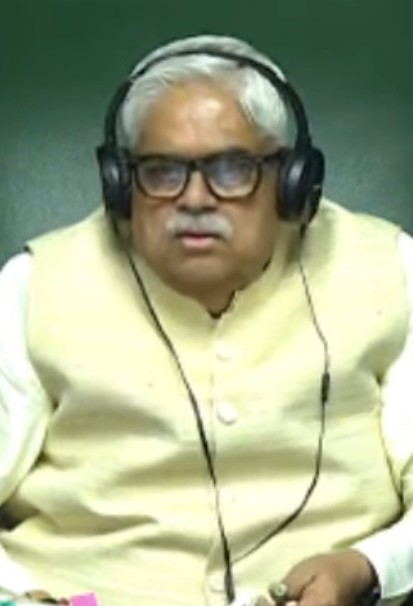
- Incumbent; G. S. Patil since 14 August 2026
- Karnataka Legislative Assembly
- Type: Speaker
- Status: Presiding Officer of Karnataka Legislative Assembly
- Member of: Karnataka Legislative Assembly
- Nominator: Members of the Karnataka Legislative Assembly
- Appointer: Members of the Karnataka Legislative Assembly
- Term length: five years
- Constituting instrument: article 178 of Indian Constitution
- Inaugural holder: V. Venkatappa (Mysore); K. S. Nagarathnamma
- Deputy: Mankala Vaidya

The state of Karnataka in India

The Speaker of the Karnataka Legislative Assembly is the presiding officer of the Legislative Assembly of Karnataka, the main law-making body for the Indian state of Karnataka. He is elected by the members of the Karnataka Legislative Assembly (until 1973, the Mysore Legislative Assembly). The speaker is usually a member of the Legislative Assembly.

== List of Speakers ==
Mysore was renamed to Karnataka on 1 November 1973.

Sl. No.	Portrait	Name	Constituency	Tenure			Assembly	Party
Mysore
1		V. Venkatappa	Channapatna	1952	1952			Indian National Congress
2		H. Siddaiah	Soraba-Shikaripur	18 June 1952	14 May 1954	1 year, 330 days		Indian National Congress
3		H. S. Rudrappa	Honnali	10 October 1954	1 November 1956	2 years, 22 days		Indian National Congress
4		S. R. Kanthi	Hungund	19 December 1956	9 March 1962	5 years, 80 days		Indian National Congress
5		Bantwal Vaikunta Baliga	Belthangady	15 March 1962	6 June 1968	6 years, 83 days		Indian National Congress
6		S. D. Kotavale	Sankeshwar	5 September 1968	24 March 1972	3 years, 201 days		Indian National Congress
7		K. S. Nagarathanamma	Gundlupete	24 March 1972	31 October 1973	1 year, 221 days continued...	5th (1972-77) continued...	Indian National Congress
Karnataka
1		K. S. Nagarathanamma	Gundlupete	1 November 1973	3 March 1978	...continued 4 years, 122 days	5th...continued (1972-77)	Indian National Congress
2		P. Venkataramana	T. Narasipur	3 March 1978	3 October 1980	2 years, 214 days	6th (1978-83)	Indian National Congress
3		Sumati B. Madiman	Dharwad Rural	22 December 1980	22 December 1980		6th (1978-83)	Indian National Congress
4		K. H. Ranganath	Hiriyur	30 January 1981	24 January 1983	2 years, 359 days	6th (1978-83)	Indian National Congress
5		D. B. Chandre Gowda	Tirthahalli	24 January 1983	17 March 1985	2 years, 52 days	7th (1983-85)	Janata Party
6		B. G. Banakar	Hirekerur	18 March 1985	17 December 1989	4 years, 274 days	8th (1985-89)	Janata Party
7		S. M. Krishna	Maddur	18 December 1989	20 January 1993	3 years, 33 days	9th (1989-94)	Indian National Congress
8		V. S. Koujalagi	Arabhavi	15 February 1993	26 December 1994	1 year, 314 days	9th (1989-94)	Indian National Congress
9		K. R. Ramesh Kumar	Srinivasapur	27 December 1994	24 October 1999	4 years, 301 days	10th (1994-99)	Janata Dal
10		M. V. Venkatappa	Mulbagal	26 October 1999	7 June 2004	4 years, 225 days	11th (1999-04)	Indian National Congress
11		Krishna	Krishnarajapete	10 June 2004	4 June 2008	3 years, 360 days	12th (2004-08)	Janata Dal (Secular)
12		Jagadish Shettar	Hubli-Dharwad Central	5 June 2008	16 November 2009	1 year, 164 days	13th (2008-13)	Bharatiya Janata Party
13		K. G. Bopaiah	Virajapete	30 November 2009	31 May 2013	3 years, 195 days	13th (2008-13)	Bharatiya Janata Party
14		Kagodu Thimmappa	Sagara	31 May 2013	5 July 2016	3 years, 35 days	14th (2013-18)	Indian National Congress
15		K. B. Koliwad	Ranibennur	5 July 2016	15 May 2018	1 year, 314 days	14th (2013-18)	Indian National Congress
Pro-term		K. G. Bopaiah	Virajapete	18 May 2018	25 May 2018	7 days	15th (2018-23)	Bharatiya Janata Party
(9)		K. R. Ramesh Kumar	Srinivasapur	25 May 2018	29 July 2019	1 year, 65 days	15th (2018-23)	Indian National Congress
16		Vishweshwar Hegde Kageri	Sirsi	31 July 2019	20 May 2023	3 years, 293 days	15th (2018-23)	Bharatiya Janata Party
17		U. T. Khader	Mangalore	24 May 2023	03 June 2026	3 years, 10 days	16th (2023-28)	Indian National Congress
–		Rudrappa Lamani (acting)	Haveri	03 June 2026	03 August 2026	31 days	16th (2023-28)	Indian National Congress
Pro-term		T. B. Jayachandra	Sira	09 August 2026	14 August 2026	5 days	16th (2023-28)	Indian National Congress
18		G. S. Patil	Ron	14 August 2026	Incumbent	39 days	16th (2023-28)	Indian National Congress

== List of Deputy Speakers ==
Sl. No.	Name	Constituency	Tenure			Assembly	Party
Mysore
1	Pullareddy	(Note: Representatives of Mysore Legislative Assembly)	1945	1949	4 years		
1	M. A. Sreenivasan	(Note: Representatives of Mysore Legislative Assembly)	1945	1949	4 years		
1	T. C. M. Rayan	(Note: Representatives of Mysore Legislative Assembly)	1945	1949	4 years		
1	O. S. Nasarulla Sharif	(Note: Representatives of Mysore Legislative Assembly)	1945	1949	4 years		
1	L. Siddappa	(Note: Representatives of Mysore Legislative Assembly)	1945	1949	4 years		
2	L. H. Thimmabhovi	(Note: Representatives of Mysore Legislative Assembly)	1950	1952	2 years		
3	R. Channigaramaiah	Koratagere-Madhugiri	1 July 1952	1 November 1956	4 years, 123 days	1st (1952-56)	Indian National Congress
4	M. Madhaiah	Nanjangud	24 December 1956	31 March 1957	97 days	1st (1952-56)	Indian National Congress
(2)	L. H. Thimmabhovi	Chikmagalur	19 July 1957	1 March 1962	4 years, 225 days	2nd (1957-62)	Indian National Congress
5	A. R. Panchagavi	Gokak–II	31 March 1962	28 February 1967	4 years, 334 days	3rd (1962-67)	Indian National Congress
6	D. Manjunath	Hiriyur	28 March 1967	14 April 1971	4 years, 17 days	4th (1967-72)	Indian National Congress
7	Balsu Pursu Kadam	Karwar	26 June 1972	31 October 1973	1 year, 127 days	5th (1972-77)	Indian National Congress
Karnataka
1	Balsu Pursu Kadam	Karwar	1 November 1973	24 March 1977	3 years, 143 days	5th (1972-77)	Indian National Congress
2	G. Puttaswamy		20 June 1977	31 December 1977	194 days	5th (1972-77)	Indian National Congress
3	Sumathi B. Madiman	Dharwad Rural	10 August 1978	21 December 1980	2 years, 133 days	6th (1978-83)	Indian National Congress (I)
4	Bapurao Hulsurkar	Basavakalyan	4 February 1981	8 January 1983	1 year, 338 days	6th (1978-83)	Indian National Congress (I)
5	C. Veeranna	Koratagere	11 March 1983	2 January 1985	1 year, 297 days	7th (1983-85)	Janata Party
6	Lakshmi Narasimhaiah	Tumkur	8 August 1985	26 April 1987	1 year, 261 days	8th (1985-89)	Janata Party
7	B. R. Yavagal	Nargund	11 September 1987	15 April 1989	1 year, 216 days	8th (1985-89)	Janata Party
8	Nagamma Keshavamurthy	Mayakonda	30 March 1990	20 January 1993	2 years, 296 days	9th (1989-94)	Indian National Congress
9	Anjanamurthy	Nelamangala	18 March 1993	17 December 1994	1 year, 274 days	9th (1989-94)	Indian National Congress
10	M. S. Patil	Raichur	30 December 1994	6 June 1996	1 year, 159 days	10th (1994-99)	Janata Dal
11	Chandrashekhar Mallikarjun Mamani	Parasgad	8 July 1996	14 January 1999	2 years, 190 days	10th (1994-99)	Janata Dal
12	Chandrashekhar Reddy Deshmukh	Sedam	11 March 1999	22 July 1999	133 days	10th (1994-99)	Janata Dal
13	Manohar Tahasildar	Hangal	30 October 1999	23 February 2004	4 years, 116 days	11th (1999-04)	Indian National Congress
14	N. Y. Gopalakrishna	Molakalmuru	17 March 2005	28 November 2007	2 years, 256 days	12th (2004-08)	Indian National Congress
15	K.G. Bopaiah	Virajpet	29 July 2008	30 December 2009	2 years, 154 days	13th (2008-13)	Bharatiya Janata Party
16	N. Yogish Bhat	Mangalore City South	11 January 2011	21 May 2013	2 years, 130 days	13th (2008-13)	Bharatiya Janata Party
17	N. H. Shivashankara Reddy	Gauribidanur	18 July 2013	18 May 2018	4 years, 304 days	14th (2013-18)	Indian National Congress
18	J. K. Krishna Reddy	Chintamani	6 July 2018	17 March 2020	1 year, 255 days	15th (2018–23)	Janata Dal (Secular)
19	Anand Mamani	Saundatti Yellamma	24 March 2020	22 October 2022	2 years, 212 days	15th (2018–23)	Bharatiya Janata Party
20	Rudrappa Lamani	Haveri	6 July 2023	3 August 2026	3 years, 28 days	16th (2023–28)	Indian National Congress
21	Mankala Vaidya	Bhatkal	18 August 2026	Incumbent	36 days	16th (2023–28)	Indian National Congress
Source: Karanataka Legislative Assembly

== Pro tem Speaker ==
=== List of Pro tem Speakers ===
Sl. No.	Name	Constituency	Assembly	Party
1	K. G. Bopaiah	Virajpet		BJP
2	Malikayya Guttedar	Afzalpur		INC
3	K. G. Bopaiah	Virajpet		BJP
4	R. V. Deshpande	Haliyal		INC

== See also ==
- List of deputy speakers of the Karnataka Legislative Assembly
- Chief Ministers of Karnataka
- Karnataka Legislature
