= Rajeev Gowda =

Indian academic and politician

M. V. Rajeev Gowda
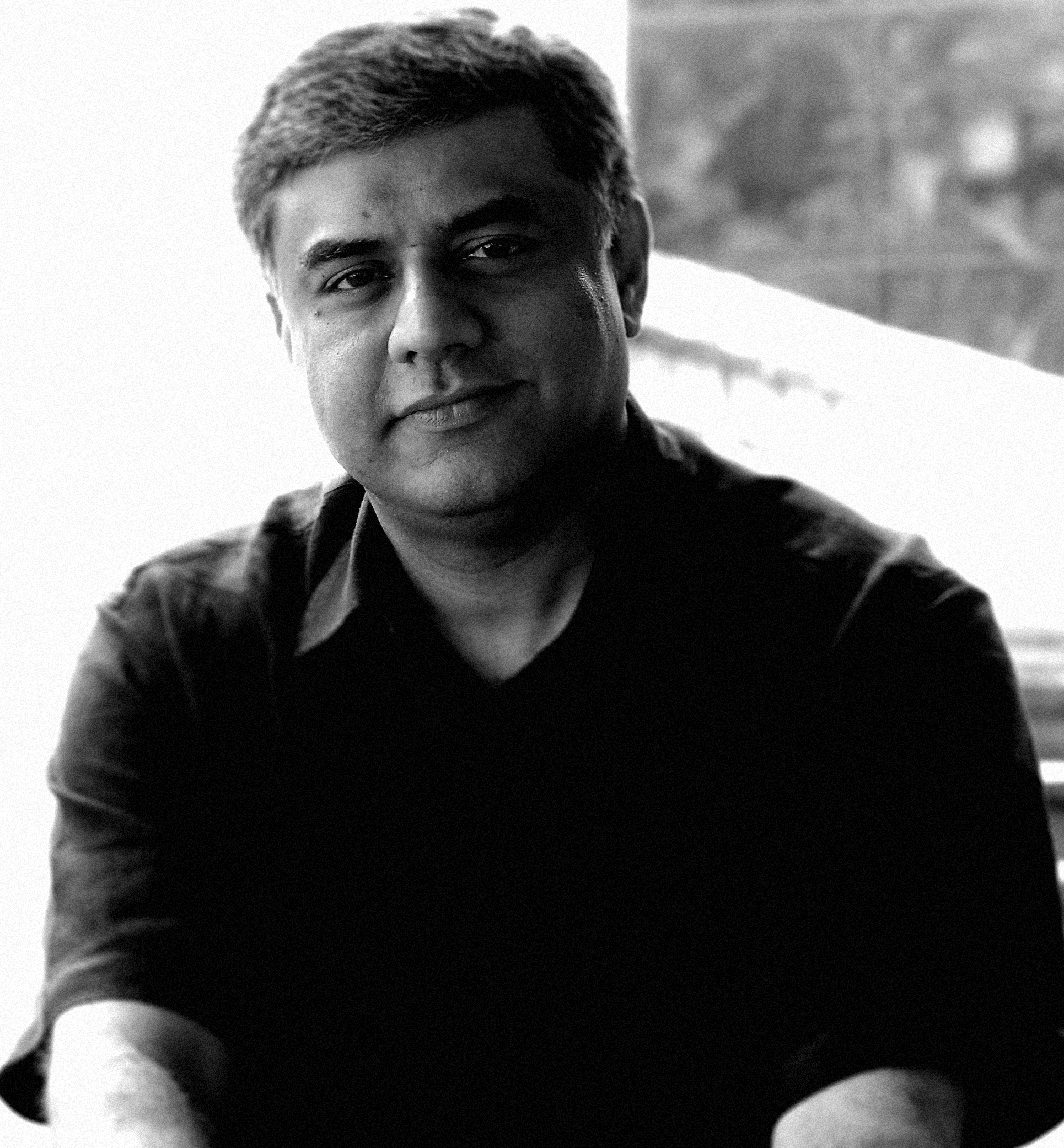

Member of Parliament, Rajya Sabha for Karnataka
- In office 26 June 2014 – 25 June 2020
- Succeeded by: Mallikarjun Kharge

Director, Central Board of Reserve Bank of India
- In office 2011–2014

Member, Executive Council & Mentor Group, Rajiv Gandhi National Institute of Youth Development
- In office 2007–2012

Director, General Insurance Corporation of India
- In office 2007–2010

Personal details
- Born: 29 October 1963 (age 62) Bangalore, Mysore State, India
- Party: Indian National Congress
- Spouse: Sharmila Bhaktaram
- Children: 2
- Parent: M. V. Venkatappa (father)
- Education: PhD(Public Policy & Management), M.A.(Economics), B.A.
- Alma mater: University of California, Berkeley; Wharton School, University of Pennsylvania; Fordham University; St. Joseph's College, Bangalore
- Occupation: Politician, Professor and Social Worker
- Awards: John M. Olin Post-doctoral Fellowship in Law & Economics, University of California, Berkeley, USA; University Fellowship, University of Pennsylvania, USA; Loyola Fellowship, Fordham University, USA
- Website: rajeevgowda.in

Mothakapalli Venkatappa Rajeev Gowda is an Indian politician and academician. He is a former member of parliament in the Rajya Sabha and a national spokesperson for the Indian National Congress. He also currently serves as chairman of the "Congress Research Department". He was Professor of Economics and Social Sciences and the chairperson of the Centre for Public Policy at the Indian Institute of Management, Bangalore and taught a range of courses. He served as the director of the Central Board, Reserve Bank of India. He is currently the advisor for Bridge India, a progressive non-profit think tank set up in London in 2018.

== Personal life ==
Rajeev Gowda was born into an eminent family in Bangalore and his father's and uncle's public lives influenced his own political ambitions. His father, M. V. Venkatappa (1932–2013), held the positions of speaker of the Karnataka Legislative Assembly and chairperson of the Karnataka Legislative Council. Venkatappa had worked as a member of Land Reforms Committee from 1972 to 1974 during the chief ministership of D. Devaraj Urs. He was also a prominent politician and was elected twice from the Mulbagal constituency, and also served as member of the upper house of the legislature for two terms. Gowda's mother, Subhadra, is a social worker and has served as president of the Karnataka Mahila Sabha. His uncle M. V. Krishnappa was involved in India's independence movement and was also the founder of the Bangalore Dairy. He was a minister in Jawaharlal Nehru's cabinet and was elected to the Lok Sabha six times.

In his youth, Gowda was active in student politics and was the vice-president of the students union at St. Joseph's College, Bangalore in 1982–83. Later, he moved to the United States for his higher education and built his academic career there, attaining tenure as a professor at the University of Oklahoma before moving back to India after more than 16 years abroad to teach at the Indian Institute of Management, Bangalore and pursue his political ambitions.

Rajeev Gowda is married to Sharmila Bhaktaram.

== Education ==
Gowda did his schooling at Cluny Convent School, Bengaluru, and at St Joseph's Boys' High School, Bengaluru. He then studied economics and political science at St. Joseph's College, Bengaluru. He was awarded the Bangalore University gold medal in political science and secured a fully funded scholarship to pursue a master's in Economics at Fordham University, New York. He holds a PhD in Public Policy & Management from Wharton School, University of Pennsylvania, USA. He was also a postdoctoral fellow in Law & Economics from the University of California, Berkeley.

== Professional career ==
In 1991, Gowda was awarded the John M. Olin Postdoctoral Fellow in Law and Economics- Law School (Boalt Hall), University of California, Berkeley, US. He was a visiting scholar at the Center for Jurisprudence and Social Policy- Law School (Boalt Hall), University of California. In the year 1992, he joined the University of Oklahoma as assistant professor of political science. From 1999 to 2000 he held the positions of associate professor of political science and research fellow in science and public policy at the University of Oklahoma. He was also the coordinator, Interdisciplinary Perspectives on the Environment Program at the university in 1999. In 2000, he moved to India to help set up the Centre for Public Policy at Indian Institute of Management, Bangalore and was chairperson of the centre. At present he is a professor at Indian Institute of Management, Bangalore.

His other professional appointments include being a Carnegie Council Global Ethics Fellow and a member of the Central Board, Reserve Bank of India. He has also held the positions of director, General Insurance Corporation of India, 2007–2010 and member, Executive Council, Rajiv Gandhi National Institute of Youth Development, 2008–present. He has been an invited columnist for several publications including Deccan Herald, Economic Times, India Today, Times of India and Outlook.

Gowda also co-founded the acclaimed Karnataka Quiz Association in 1983, and was the national runner up on BBC TV's Mastermind India in 2001.

Gowda is a renowned expert in election law. He contributed to the Routledge Handbook of Election Law.

== Political career ==
Rajeev Gowda was chosen to launch the Congress party's younger generation election campaign nationally in Guwahati, 2004.

At the Karnataka Pradesh Congress Committee, he is the official spokesperson and member of the Manifesto Committee. He was the chairman of the BBMP Election Manifesto Drafting Committee, 2010 and an ex-convenor, Vichar Vibhag.

To strengthen the support base of the Congress online, Rajeev Gowda has co-founded and runs a pro-Congress blog site hamaracongress.com

=== In Parliament ===
Gowda is a member of the following committees in his capacity as a Member of Parliament:

- Member, National Institute of Mental Health and Neuro-Sciences (NIMHANS), Bangalore (July 2014 – Present)
- Member, Committee on Human Resource Development (Sept. 2014–Present)
- Member, Committee on Subordinate Legislation (Sept. 2015–Present)
- Member, Court of the Jawaharlal Nehru University (Sept 2015–Present)
- Member, Select Committee of Rajya Sabha on the Real Estate (Regulation and Development) Bill, 2013 (May 2015 – Present)
- Member, Court of Manipur University (March 2016 – Present)
- Member of parliament Rajya shaba

== Newspaper columns ==
Highlighting various programs pioneered by the Congress party:

- On the youth fellowship with Prime Minister's Rural Development Fund, an outlook: “Our country's own peace corps”, Daily News Analysis, 28 November 2013
- Right to Education, every child's right as envisioned by Shri Pandit Jawaharlal Nehru: “An ideal birthday gift for Pandit Jawaharlal Nehru”, Daily News Analysis, 15 November 2013
- Distribution of Aakash tablets and making the internet available in rural areas: “Technology to transform teaching”, Vijaya Karnataka (Kannada newspaper), 18 September 2013
- Explaining and addressing the concerns expressed over the Food Security Bill: “Is the Food Security Bill a mere election gimmick?”, IBN Live, 27 August 2013

Elections, polls, statehood:

- Highlighting the necessity of banning public polls and opinion polls as directed by the Election Commission themselves: “EC has a point. Polls sway voters”, Daily News Analysis, 7 November 2013
- On the present condition of various states in India and the reason behind the formation of a separate Telangana state: “Rajyotsava: the celebration of Statehood”, Daily News Analysis, 1 November 2013
- Denunciation of ordinance on convicted lawmakers and the urgent need for electoral reforms: “Don't cripple clean politicians”, Times of India, 8 October 2013
- In-depth budget analysis and reasons for incorporation of subsidies: “A virtuous cycle will be unleashed”, Deccan Herald, 27 January 2013
- A career in politics is like an entrepreneurial venture, a dream with an unknown outcome, PaGaLGuY, 26 June 2012
- Right to Education is not just symbolic, Daily News analysis Newspaper, 5 August 2010

Karnataka Elections and the formation of people's government:

- The Congress government formation in Karnataka state and its implications: “Seven seats now, potential of 28 in 2014”, Business Today, 10 May 2013
- The next steps to be taken by the newly elected Congress government: “Agenda before Karnataka's new Government”, Business Line (The Hindu supplement), 9 May 2013
- The need to vote for a sustainable democracy: “Should more people vote? Then, let's revive the festival of democracy”, Times of India, 3 May 2013
- Answering various queries of the youth with regard to the May 2013 Karnataka state elections: Q&A: Karnataka Assembly polls, IBN Live, 11 April 2013
- A trip to the turbulent Karnataka political history: “Descent into democratic decadence”, Indiaseminar.com, 13 July 2011

Women's Safety: a high priority:

- Various women oriented NGO's unite to fight against injustice and moral policing: “A billion high fives for inclusiveness”, Times of India, 14 February 2013
- Insight into the anti-rape laws in India, post the Delhi-gang rape incident: “Anti-Rape Legislation in India: The Name Game”, One India news portal, 4 January 2013
- Protesting against the Ram Sena league which threatens the freedom and rights of women on celebrating Valentine's Day: “The protest is a forum to stand up for one's rights”, Daily News Analysis, 11 February 2009

On the need for electoral and economic reforms:

- A review of the Monsoon parliamentary session: “Five steps to make the Indian parliament more effective”, First Post news portal, 8 September 2013* Corruption in India and election expenditure laws: “The costs of democracy”, The Indian Express, 19 July 2013
- Initiatives to be taken by the UPA II for economic reforms: “It's time for UPA-II to retake the initiative”, The Financial Express, 31 December 2011
- Insight into the cost of fighting elections and being a politician: “Wages Of Democracy”, Outlook, 27 September 2009
- Consumer's perspective: Consumers slip on price flip, Deccan Herald, 11 July 2010
- Transforming Leadership, Economic Times, 7 December 2003
- Towards a realistic Economics, Economic Times, 19 October 2002

Opinions:

- The man that was: Nelson Mandela – a man who was free even in prison, Daily News Analysis Newspaper, 2 December 2013
- Being an alumnus of Wharton and its meaning: Wharton And All, Outlook India, 28 September 2013
- Notes from the campaign trail – 3. Media Perversions, Hamaracongress.com, 31 May 2010
- Sonia's new whizkid, rediff.com, 15 March 2004

== Books ==
- Judgments, Decisions, and Public Policy: Behavioral Decision Theory Perspectives and Applications, (Editor, with Jeffrey Fox), New York: Cambridge University Press, 2002
- Integrating Insurance and Risk Management for Hazardous Wastes, (Co-editor, with Howard Kunreuther), Boston: Kluwer, 1990
