= G. K. Venkatashiva Reddy =

Indian politician (born 1947)

G. K. Venkatashiva Reddy (born 1947) is an Indian politician from Karnataka. He is a five time member of the Karnataka Legislative Assembly from Srinivasapur Assembly constituency in Kolar district. He represented Indian National Congress in the first three terms but was elected as a Janata Dal (Secular) party candidate in the last two elections he won. He won the 2023 Karnataka Legislative Assembly election as a JD (S) candidate.

== Early life and education ==
Reddy is from Srinivasapur, Kolar district. His father is G V Krishnareddy. He completed B.Sc. and LLB from Government Law College, Arahalli, Kolar district.

== Career ==
Reddy won from Srinivasapur Assembly constituency representing Janata Dal (Secular) in the 2023 Karnataka Legislative Assembly election. He polled 95,463 votes and defeated his nearest rival, K. R. Ramesh Kumar of Indian National Congress, by a margin of 10,443 votes.

He became an MLA for the first time representing Indian National Congress from Srinivasapur winning the 1983 Karnataka Legislative Assembly election. From then on, he and his rival Ramesh Kumar were alternating as the MLA from this seat. However, his opponent broke the tradition and won twice, consecutively in 2018. Reddy won in 1989, 1999, 2008 and 2023.

He won the 1989 Karnataka Legislative Assembly election. In the 1999 Karnataka Legislative Assembly election, he defeated K. R. Ramesh Kumar an independent candidate by a narrow margin of 1,193 votes.
