= H M Ganesh Prasad =

Indian National Congress politician

Member of Karnataka Legislative Assembly
- Incumbent
- Assumed office 2023
- Preceded by: C. S. Niranjan Kumar
- Constituency: Gundlupet

Personal details
- Party: Indian National Congress
- Parent: H. S. Mahadeva Prasad

H M Ganesh Prasad is an Indian National Congress politician from Karnataka, and a member of the Karnataka Legislative Assembly for Gundlupet Assembly constituency of Chamarajanagar district, Karnataka.

He is the son of H. S. Mahadeva Prasad who was five-time Member of the Legislative Assembly from the Gundlupet.

== Positions held ==
- 2023: Elected to Karnataka Legislative Assembly
