= Kothur G. Manjunath =

Indian politician

Member of the Karnataka Legislative Assembly
- Incumbent
- Assumed office May 2023
- Preceded by: K. Srinivasa Gowda
- Constituency: Kolar
- In office 2013–2018
- Preceded by: Amaresh
- Succeeded by: H. Nagesh
- Constituency: Mulbagal

Personal details
- Born: Karnataka, India
- Party: Indian National Congress

Kothur G. Manjunath is an Indian politician from Karnataka. He is currently serving as member of Karnataka Legislative Assembly representing Kolar.

== Political career ==
He is former member of Karnataka Legislative Assembly from Mulbagal. Manjunath entered the election as an independent candidate, having been denied the ticket by the Congress party, but has later joined the party. In 2015 Manjunath was involved in controversy regarding a caste certificate issued for him and he was denied to participate in the 2018 Karnataka assembly election due to court order for fake certificate.

== Controversy ==
In May 2025, Manjunath drew widespread condemnation after publicly dismissing Operation Sindoor — India's precision military strikes launched on 7 May 2025 against terrorist infrastructure in Pakistan and Azad Jammu and Kashmir in response to the Pahalgam terror attack — as little more than a show of force. Speaking to media in Kolar, he questioned the operation's effectiveness, saying "apart from sending four fighter jets to bomb nine terrorist camps in Pakistan, what else has the government done?" and likening the response to an insult to the families of the 26 people killed in Pahalgam. He also demanded concrete proof of the claimed casualties, called the attack an intelligence failure, and suggested India should have taken a more aggressive approach akin to Israel or Russia. The remarks triggered swift cross-party backlash. BJP National Spokesperson C.R. Keshavan called the statements "unpatriotic" and "anti-national," accusing Manjunath of attempting to "defame, discredit and deplorably attack" the Indian armed forces. A formal complaint was subsequently filed against him at the Banashankari Police Station in Bengaluru, accusing him of making "derogatory and inflammatory remarks" against the armed forces and hurting national sentiments. Janes Faced with mounting pressure, Manjunath issued a clarification stating he had no doubts about the Army, though critics dismissed it as a half-hearted backtrack.

In February 2026, Manjunath drew significant public criticism following remarks he made at a Vemagal Town Panchayat meeting in response to the virtual inauguration of India's first Airbus H125 helicopter Final Assembly Line at Vemagal, Kolar district, on 17 February 2026 — an event jointly presided over by Prime Minister Narendra Modi and French President Emmanuel Macron. Expressing anger over what he described as the deliberate exclusion of local elected representatives from the inauguration, Manjunath alleged that the Vemagal Town Panchayat President had been denied a formal invitation and that local officials had received only an email notification rather than a proper ceremonial invite. He further alleged that the facility had not established an independent electrical feeder, instead drawing power from Vemagal's existing local grid, causing disruptions to residents. In protest, Manjunath publicly threatened to have the electricity supply to the facility cut off and reportedly urged farmers to use tractors to destroy the electricity poles supplying the industrial area. He also criticised the plant's employment practices, claiming that local youth were being offered only low-skilled positions while managerial roles were reserved for outsiders. The incident reignited longstanding concerns over India's ease of doing business, particularly regarding the exposure of large-scale foreign investment projects to unpredictable political interference at the local level. Within Karnataka specifically, the episode drew sharp scrutiny of the state's law and order environment and its capacity to provide stable, secure conditions for major industrial ventures, with critics questioning whether elected representatives wielding influence over critical infrastructure posed a systemic risk to the state's reputation as a preferred destination for global investment.
