= R. Shankar =

R. Shankar may refer to:

- Ramamurti Shankar, professor of physics
- R. Shankar (politician), Indian politician
- Ravi Shankar , Indian sitarist and composer

== See also ==
- R. Sankar, Indian politician and statesman
