= M. V. Venkatappa =

Indian politician

10th Speaker of the Karnataka Legislative Assembly
- In office 26 October 1999 – 7 June 2004
- Preceded by: K. R. Ramesh Kumar
- Succeeded by: Krishna
- Constituency: Mulbagal

Member of Legislative Assembly, Karnataka
- In office 1999–2004
- Preceded by: R. Venkataramaiah
- Succeeded by: R. Srinivasa
- Constituency: Mulbagal
- In office 1989–1994
- Preceded by: R. Srinivasa
- Succeeded by: R. Srinivasa
- Constituency: Mulbagal

Personal details
- Born: Malavalli
- Party: Indian National Congress
- Children: Rajeev Gowda
- Occupation: Politician

M. V. Venkatappa (1932–2013) was an Indian politician from the state of Karnataka. He was born in a Vokkaliga family. Venkatappa was the Karnataka Legislative Assembly speaker from 1999 to 2004, as MLA from Mulbagal.

His brother M. V. Krishnappa was involved in India's freedom movement and was also the founder of the Bangalore Dairy. He was a minister in Jawaharlal Nehru's cabinet and was elected to the Lok Sabha six times. He was also a Member of Legislative Council in Karnataka for a brief period. M. V. Venkatappa unsuccessfully contested Legislative Council Polls along with Lingayath leader N. R. Jagadeesh as Independent candidate to ensure votes from Veerappa Moily led Indian National Congress (Indira) and S. Bangarappa led Karnataka Kranti Ranga in 1983. Both leaders were defeated by Abdul Nazir Sab and P.G.R. Sindhia who later became ministers in Janata Party governments led by Ramakrishna Hegde and S. R. Bommai.

His son Rajeev Gowda, was also an Indian politician and academic. He is a former member of parliament in the Rajya Sabha from 26 June 2014 till 25 June 2020 and a national spokesperson for the Indian National Congress.
