= Ranibennur Assembly constituency =

Legislative Assembly constituency in Karnataka State, India

Coordinates: 14.62°N 75.63°E

Ranebennur
- Constituency No. 87 for the Karnataka Legislative Assembly

Constituency details
- Country: India
- Region: South India
- State: Karnataka
- District: Haveri
- Lok Sabha constituency: Haveri
- Established: 1951
- Total electors: 237,234
- Reservation: None

Member of Legislative Assembly
- 16th Karnataka Legislative Assembly
- Incumbent Prakash Koliwad
- Party: Indian National Congress
- Elected year: 2023
- Preceded by: Arunkumar Guththur

Ranebennur Assembly constituency is one of the 224 Legislative Assembly constituencies of Karnataka in India.

It is part of Haveri district. Prakash Koliwad is the current MLA from Ranebennur.

== Members of the Legislative Assembly ==
| Year | Member | Political party |
|---|---|---|
| 1952 | Kallanagouda Fakirgouda Patil | Indian National Congress |
| 1957 | Kallanagouda Fakirgouda Patil | Indian National Congress |
| 1957 | Sambrani Yallawwa W/o Dharmappa | Indian National Congress |
| 1962 | Yallawa Dharmappa Sambrani | Indian National Congress |
| 1967 | B. N. Lingappa | Praja Socialist Party |
| 1972 | K. B. Koliwad | Indian National Congress |
| 1978 | Nalawagal Somalingappa Hanumantappa | Indian National Congress |
| 1983 | Patil Basanagouda Guranagouda | Janata Party |
| 1985 | K. B. Koliwad | Indian National Congress |
| 1989 | K. B. Koliwad | Indian National Congress |
| 1994 | Karjagi Veerappa Sannatammappa | Janata Dal |
| 1999 | K. B. Koliwad | Indian National Congress |
| 2004 | G. Shivanna | Bharatiya Janata Party |
| 2008 | G. Shivanna | Bharatiya Janata Party |
| 2013 | K. B. Koliwad | Indian National Congress |
| 2018 | R. Shankar (Note: Disqualified by the Hon'ble Speaker under the 10th Schedule of the Constitution with effect from 25/07/2019) | Karnataka Pragnyavantha Janatha Party |
| 2019 (Note: By-Election) | Arunkumar Guttur | Bharatiya Janata Party |
| 2023 | Prakash Koliwad | Indian National Congress |

== Election results ==
=== Assembly Election 2023 ===
2023 Karnataka Legislative Assembly election : Ranibennur
| Party | Candidate | Votes | % | ±% |
|---|---|---|---|---|
| INC | Prakash Koliwad | 71,830 | 37.21 | ▼5.19 |
| BJP | Arunkumar Guttur | 62,030 | 32.14 | ▼23.90 |
| NCP | R. Shankar | 37,559 | 19.46 | New |
| Independent | Santoshkumar Patil | 11,395 | 5.90 | New |
| JD(S) | Manjunath Gowda Shivannanavar | 5,840 | 3.03 | ▲2.46 |
| NOTA | None of the above | 1,584 | 0.82 | ▼0.12 |
| Margin of victory | | 9,800 | 5.08 | ▼8.56 |
| Turnout | | 193,177 | 81.43 | ▲7.56 |
| Total valid votes | | 193,020 | | |
| Registered electors | | 237,234 | | ▲1.67 |
| INC gain from BJP | | Swing | ▼18.83 | |

=== Assembly By-election 2019 ===
2019 Karnataka Legislative Assembly by-election : Ranibennur
| Party | Candidate | Votes | % | ±% |
|---|---|---|---|---|
| BJP | Arunkumar Guttur | 95,438 | 56.04 | ▲28.73 |
| INC | K. B. Koliwad | 72,216 | 42.40 | ▲9.18 |
| NOTA | None of the above | 1,608 | 0.94 | ▲0.15 |
| Margin of victory | | 23,222 | 13.64 | ▲11.22 |
| Turnout | | 172,358 | 73.87 | ▼4.04 |
| Total valid votes | | 170,303 | | |
| Registered electors | | 233,326 | | ▲1.29 |
| BJP gain from KPJP | | Swing | ▲20.40 | |

=== Assembly Election 2018 ===
2018 Karnataka Legislative Assembly election : Ranibennur
| Party | Candidate | Votes | % | ±% |
|---|---|---|---|---|
| KPJP | R. Shankar | 63,910 | 35.64 | New |
| INC | K. B. Koliwad | 59,572 | 33.22 | ▼13.10 |
| BJP | Basavaraj Dr. Kelagar | 48,973 | 27.31 | ▲19.15 |
| NOTA | None of the above | 1,420 | 0.79 | New |
| Independent | Rukmani Sawkar | 1,226 | 0.68 | New |
| JD(S) | Shripad Sawkar | 1,219 | 0.68 | ▼11.50 |
| Margin of victory | | 4,338 | 2.42 | ▼3.43 |
| Turnout | | 179,475 | 77.91 | ▼1.40 |
| Total valid votes | | 179,321 | | |
| Registered electors | | 230,349 | | ▲14.72 |
| KPJP gain from INC | | Swing | ▼10.68 | |

=== Assembly Election 2013 ===
2013 Karnataka Legislative Assembly election : Ranibennur
| Party | Candidate | Votes | % | ±% |
|---|---|---|---|---|
| INC | K. B. Koliwad | 53,780 | 46.32 | ▲1.20 |
| Independent | R. Shankar | 46,992 | 40.48 | New |
| KJP | G. Shivanna | 26,570 | 22.89 | New |
| JD(S) | Manjunath Gowda Shivannanavar | 14,146 | 12.18 | ▲9.22 |
| BJP | Arunkumar Pujar | 9,476 | 8.16 | ▼39.13 |
| Independent | Hanumantappa. D. Kabbar | 2,975 | 2.56 | New |
| Independent | Basappa Puttappa Banakar | 1,053 | 0.91 | New |
| BSP | Gurulingappagowdra Umesh Mahadevappa | 944 | 0.81 | ▼0.30 |
| Margin of victory | | 6,788 | 5.85 | ▲3.67 |
| Turnout | | 159,241 | 79.31 | ▲9.38 |
| Total valid votes | | 116,099 | | |
| Registered electors | | 200,789 | | ▲11.76 |
| INC gain from BJP | | Swing | ▼0.97 | |

=== Assembly Election 2008 ===
2008 Karnataka Legislative Assembly election : Ranibennur
| Party | Candidate | Votes | % | ±% |
|---|---|---|---|---|
| BJP | G. Shivanna | 59,399 | 47.29 | ▼1.99 |
| INC | K. B. Koliwad | 56,667 | 45.12 | ▲9.72 |
| JD(S) | Ramalingannanavar. S. S | 3,720 | 2.96 | ▼8.37 |
| Independent | Ramachandrappa Guddappa Billal | 2,208 | 1.76 | New |
| BSP | Dr. B. G. Patil | 1,388 | 1.11 | New |
| JD(U) | Kotresh. R. Meharwade | 828 | 0.66 | New |
| Margin of victory | | 2,732 | 2.18 | ▼11.70 |
| Turnout | | 125,634 | 69.93 | ▼1.25 |
| Total valid votes | | 125,603 | | |
| Registered electors | | 179,660 | | ▲10.16 |
| BJP hold | | Swing | ▼1.99 | |

=== Assembly Election 2004 ===
2004 Karnataka Legislative Assembly election : Ranibennur
| Party | Candidate | Votes | % | ±% |
|---|---|---|---|---|
| BJP | G. Shivanna | 57,123 | 49.28 | ▲48.11 |
| INC | K. B. Koliwad | 41,037 | 35.40 | ▼14.83 |
| JD(S) | Kambli Kubeerappa Puttappa | 13,135 | 11.33 | New |
| JP | Rajanna P. Pawar | 1,644 | 1.42 | New |
| Urs Samyuktha Paksha | Kotresh. R. Meharwade | 901 | 0.78 | New |
| Independent | Dr. Hande Mohan | 849 | 0.73 | New |
| Margin of victory | | 16,086 | 13.88 | ▲8.46 |
| Turnout | | 116,083 | 71.18 | ▲1.11 |
| Total valid votes | | 115,920 | | |
| Registered electors | | 163,087 | | ▲9.16 |
| BJP gain from INC | | Swing | ▼0.95 | |

=== Assembly Election 1999 ===
1999 Karnataka Legislative Assembly election : Ranibennur
| Party | Candidate | Votes | % | ±% |
|---|---|---|---|---|
| INC | K. B. Koliwad | 50,958 | 50.23 | ▲19.71 |
| JD(U) | Tilavalli Shivanna Gurappa | 45,460 | 44.81 | New |
| BSP | Karur Maradeppa Mallappa | 1,827 | 1.80 | New |
| BJP | K. Shivalingappa | 1,188 | 1.17 | ▼4.89 |
| SP | Sanghavi Dayalal Premachand | 765 | 0.75 | New |
| Independent | Pujar Ningappa Bharamappa | 686 | 0.68 | New |
| Margin of victory | | 5,498 | 5.42 | ▼20.82 |
| Turnout | | 104,680 | 70.07 | ▲0.10 |
| Total valid votes | | 101,441 | | |
| Rejected ballots | | 3,226 | 3.08 | ▲1.10 |
| Registered electors | | 149,397 | | ▲9.51 |
| INC gain from JD | | Swing | ▼6.53 | |

=== Assembly Election 1994 ===
1994 Karnataka Legislative Assembly election : Ranibennur
| Party | Candidate | Votes | % | ±% |
|---|---|---|---|---|
| JD | Karjagi Veerappa Sannatammappa | 53,080 | 56.76 | ▲10.69 |
| INC | K. B. Koliwad | 28,542 | 30.52 | ▼18.84 |
| BJP | Bidari Fakkirappa Kariyappa | 5,663 | 6.06 | ▲5.19 |
| INC | Hande Mohan Revanasiddappa | 3,735 | 3.99 | New |
| JP | Patil Ajjanagouda Basanagooda | 1,060 | 1.13 | New |
| Margin of victory | | 24,538 | 26.24 | ▲22.95 |
| Turnout | | 95,452 | 69.97 | ▼2.88 |
| Total valid votes | | 93,524 | | |
| Rejected ballots | | 1,892 | 1.98 | ▼2.57 |
| Registered electors | | 136,417 | | ▲8.31 |
| JD gain from INC | | Swing | ▲7.40 | |

=== Assembly Election 1989 ===
1989 Karnataka Legislative Assembly election : Ranibennur
| Party | Candidate | Votes | % | ±% |
|---|---|---|---|---|
| INC | K. B. Koliwad | 43,228 | 49.36 | ▲5.84 |
| JD | Karjagi Veerappa Sannatammappa | 40,350 | 46.07 | New |
| JP | Koradhanyamath Kallayya Nagayya | 1,857 | 2.12 | New |
| BJP | Kottur Tejappa Hanamappa | 765 | 0.87 | New |
| Margin of victory | | 2,878 | 3.29 | ▲2.82 |
| Turnout | | 91,751 | 72.85 | ▼0.21 |
| Total valid votes | | 87,579 | | |
| Rejected ballots | | 4,172 | 4.55 | ▲2.86 |
| Registered electors | | 125,945 | | ▲18.24 |
| INC hold | | Swing | ▲5.84 | |

=== Assembly Election 1985 ===
1985 Karnataka Legislative Assembly election : Ranibennur
| Party | Candidate | Votes | % | ±% |
|---|---|---|---|---|
| INC | K. B. Koliwad | 33,296 | 43.52 | ▲25.67 |
| JP | Patil Basanagouda Guranagouda | 32,939 | 43.05 | ▼11.36 |
| Independent | Karur Maradeppa Mallappa | 9,248 | 12.09 | New |
| Independent | Kottur Telappa Hanumantapa | 502 | 0.66 | New |
| Margin of victory | | 357 | 0.47 | ▼34.05 |
| Turnout | | 77,821 | 73.06 | ▼0.06 |
| Total valid votes | | 76,505 | | |
| Rejected ballots | | 1,316 | 1.69 | ▼1.02 |
| Registered electors | | 106,512 | | ▲13.27 |
| INC gain from JP | | Swing | ▼10.89 | |

=== Assembly Election 1983 ===
1983 Karnataka Legislative Assembly election : Ranibennur
| Party | Candidate | Votes | % | ±% |
|---|---|---|---|---|
| JP | Patil Basanagouda Guranagouda | 36,395 | 54.41 | ▲12.23 |
| Independent | Karur Maradeppa Mallappa | 13,302 | 19.88 | New |
| INC | Talawar. B. G | 11,941 | 17.85 | ▲3.89 |
| Independent | Chudamani Basappa | 4,225 | 6.32 | New |
| Margin of victory | | 23,093 | 34.52 | ▲33.19 |
| Turnout | | 68,755 | 73.12 | ▼2.18 |
| Total valid votes | | 66,895 | | |
| Rejected ballots | | 1,860 | 2.71 | ▲0.10 |
| Registered electors | | 94,031 | | ▲16.86 |
| JP gain from INC(I) | | Swing | ▲10.90 | |

=== Assembly Election 1978 ===
1978 Karnataka Legislative Assembly election : Ranibennur
| Party | Candidate | Votes | % | ±% |
|---|---|---|---|---|
| INC(I) | Nalawagal Somalingappa Hanumantappa | 25,675 | 43.51 | New |
| JP | Patil Basanagouda Guranagouda | 24,892 | 42.18 | New |
| INC | K. B. Koliwad | 8,238 | 13.96 | ▼47.04 |
| Margin of victory | | 783 | 1.33 | ▼23.24 |
| Turnout | | 60,592 | 75.30 | ▲2.45 |
| Total valid votes | | 59,008 | | |
| Rejected ballots | | 1,584 | 2.61 | ▲2.61 |
| Registered electors | | 80,463 | | ▲21.93 |
| INC(I) gain from INC | | Swing | ▼17.49 | |

=== Assembly Election 1972 ===
1972 Mysore State Legislative Assembly election : Ranibennur
| Party | Candidate | Votes | % | ±% |
|---|---|---|---|---|
| INC | K. B. Koliwad | 28,540 | 61.00 | ▲24.14 |
| INC(O) | B. C. Patil | 17,043 | 36.43 | New |
| Independent | J. M. Channabasappa | 703 | 1.50 | New |
| ABJS | M. H. Hallimall Gauda | 503 | 1.08 | New |
| Margin of victory | | 11,497 | 24.57 | ▼0.28 |
| Turnout | | 48,072 | 72.85 | ▲1.26 |
| Total valid votes | | 46,789 | | |
| Registered electors | | 65,990 | | ▲9.45 |
| INC gain from PSP | | Swing | ▼0.71 | |

=== Assembly Election 1967 ===
1967 Mysore State Legislative Assembly election : Ranibennur
| Party | Candidate | Votes | % | ±% |
|---|---|---|---|---|
| PSP | B. N. Lingappa | 25,550 | 61.71 | ▲22.30 |
| INC | M. B. Uliweppa | 15,262 | 36.86 | ▼21.70 |
| Independent | T. K. Santavva | 593 | 1.43 | New |
| Margin of victory | | 10,288 | 24.85 | ▲5.70 |
| Turnout | | 43,159 | 71.59 | ▲6.19 |
| Total valid votes | | 41,405 | | |
| Registered electors | | 60,290 | | ▲18.37 |
| PSP gain from INC | | Swing | ▲3.15 | |

=== Assembly Election 1962 ===
1962 Mysore State Legislative Assembly election : Ranibennur
| Party | Candidate | Votes | % | ±% |
|---|---|---|---|---|
| INC | Yallawa Dharmappa Sambrani | 18,715 | 58.56 | ▼7.43 |
| PSP | Yallappa Venkapa Jogannowar | 12,596 | 39.41 | New |
| SWA | Basavannappa Mallappa Chalawadi | 650 | 2.03 | New |
| Margin of victory | | 6,119 | 19.15 | ▲4.33 |
| Turnout | | 33,308 | 65.40 | ▲8.06 |
| Total valid votes | | 31,961 | | |
| Registered electors | | 50,932 | | ▼38.74 |
| INC hold | | Swing | ▲22.97 | |

=== Assembly Election 1957 ===
1957 Mysore State Legislative Assembly election : Ranibennur
| Party | Candidate | Votes | % | ±% |
|---|---|---|---|---|
| INC | Kallanagouda Fakirgouda Patil | 33,937 | 35.59 | ▼34.69 |
| INC | Sambrani Yallawwa W/o Dharmappa | 28,988 | 30.40 | ▼39.88 |
| Independent | Madapurmath Panchazarayya Puttayya | 19,804 | 20.77 | New |
| Independent | Gabbur Mallappa Shettappa | 12,624 | 13.24 | New |
| Margin of victory | | 14,133 | 14.82 | ▼29.41 |
| Turnout | | 95,353 | 57.34 | ▼11.76 |
| Total valid votes | | 95,353 | | |
| Registered electors | | 83,147 | | ▲49.84 |
| INC hold | | Swing | ▼34.69 | |

=== Assembly Election 1952 ===
1952 Bombay State Legislative Assembly election : Ranibennur
| Party | Candidate | Votes | % | ±% |
|---|---|---|---|---|
| INC | Kallanagouda Fakirgouda Patil | 26,946 | 70.28 | New |
| KMPP | Kulkarni, Hanmantrao Chikko | 9,986 | 26.04 | New |
| Independent | Patil, Ramsing Peerappa | 1,410 | 3.68 | New |
| Margin of victory | | 16,960 | 44.23 | |
| Turnout | | 38,342 | 69.10 | |
| Total valid votes | | 38,342 | | |
| Registered electors | | 55,491 | | |
| INC win (new seat) | | | | |

== See also ==
- List of constituencies of the Karnataka Legislative Assembly
- Haveri district
