= Kolar Assembly constituency =

Legislative Assembly constituency in Karnataka, India

Coordinates: 13.13°N 78.12°E

Kolar
- Constituency No. 148 for the Karnataka Legislative Assembly

Constituency details
- Country: India
- Region: South India
- State: Karnataka
- District: Kolar
- Lok Sabha constituency: Kolar
- Established: 1951
- Total electors: 240,487
- Reservation: None

Member of Legislative Assembly
- 16th Karnataka Legislative Assembly
- Incumbent Kothur G. Manjunath
- Party: Indian National Congress
- Elected year: 2023
- Preceded by: K. Srinivasa Gowda

Kolar Assembly constituency is one of the seats in Karnataka Legislative Assembly in India. It is a segment of Kolar Lok Sabha constituency.

== Members of the Legislative Assembly ==
Election	Member	Party
1952	K. Pattabhiraman	Independent politician
1957	D. Abdul Rasheed	Indian National Congress
1962	P. Venkatagiriappa	Independent politician
1967	P. Venkatagiriappa	Independent politician
1972	D. Venkataramiah	Indian National Congress
1978	M. Abdul Latheef	Indian National Congress
1983	K. R. Shrinivasaiah	Janata Party
1985	K. R. Shrinivasaiah	Janata Party
1989	K. A. Nisar Ahamed	Indian National Congress
1994	K. Srinivasa Gowda	Janata Dal
1999	K. Srinivasa Gowda	Janata Dal
2004	K. Srinivasa Gowda	Indian National Congress
2008	Varthur Prakash	Independent politician
2013	Varthur Prakash	Independent politician
2018	K. Srinivasa Gowda	Janata Dal
2023	Kothur G. Manjunath	Indian National Congress

== Election results ==
=== Assembly Election 2023 ===
2023 Karnataka Legislative Assembly election : Kolar
Party	Candidate	Votes	%	±%
INC	Kothur G. Manjunath	83,990	43.56%	▲22.04
JD(S)	C. M. R. Srinath	53,229	27.61%	▼18.61
BJP	Varthur Prakash	50,914	26.41%	▲19.45
AAP	Jameel Ahamed. N	1,158	0.60%	New
NOTA	None of the above	1,005	0.52%	▼0.15
Margin of victory		30,761	15.95%	▼8.76
Turnout		193,052	80.28%	▲0.64
Total valid votes		192,818		
Registered electors		240,487		▲6.80
INC gain from JD(S)		Swing	▼2.66	

=== Assembly Election 2018 ===
2018 Karnataka Legislative Assembly election : Kolar
Party	Candidate	Votes	%	±%
JD(S)	K. Srinivasa Gowda	82,788	46.22%	▲11.03
INC	Syed Zameer Pasha	38,537	21.52%	▼7.48
Namma Congress	Varthur Prakash	35,544	19.85%	New
BJP	R. Venkatachalapathi (Om Shakthi Chalapathi)	12,458	6.96%	▲5.83
Independent	Gowramma	2,085	1.16%	New
Independent	Srinivasa	1,266	0.71%	New
NOTA	None of the above	1,195	0.67%	New
Margin of victory		44,251	24.71%	▲15.91
Turnout		179,343	79.64%	▼3.72
Total valid votes		179,102		
Registered electors		225,183		▲14.74
JD(S) gain from Independent		Swing	▲2.23	

=== Assembly Election 2013 ===
2013 Karnataka Legislative Assembly election : Kolar
Party	Candidate	Votes	%	±%
Independent	Varthur Prakash	62,957	43.99%	New
JD(S)	K. Srinivasa Gowda	50,366	35.19%	▲33.95
INC	Naseer Ahmed	41,510	29.00%	▼6.85
BJP	Anand. M. S	1,617	1.13%	▼3.34
Independent	K. S. Srinivasa Gowda	1,147	0.80%	New
Independent	S. Muniyappa	1,056	0.74%	New
KJP	Abdul Rehaman	1,041	0.73%	New
Margin of victory		12,591	8.80%	▼7.80
Turnout		163,586	83.36%	▲12.67
Total valid votes		143,121		
Registered electors		196,250		▲9.30
Independent hold		Swing	▼8.46	

=== Assembly Election 2008 ===
2008 Karnataka Legislative Assembly election : Kolar
Party	Candidate	Votes	%	±%
Independent	Varthur Prakash	66,446	52.45%	New
INC	K. Srinivasa Gowda	45,417	35.85%	▼12.84
BJP	C. Sonnegowda	5,661	4.47%	▼23.10
JD(S)	Nisar Ahmed. K. A	1,569	1.24%	▼17.85
Independent	K. S. Srinivasa Gowda	1,464	1.16%	New
BSP	Syed Sajjad	1,216	0.96%	New
Independent	D. L. Nagaraj	917	0.72%	New
Independent	N. Prakash	914	0.72%	New
Independent	Srinivasa	835	0.66%	New
Margin of victory		21,029	16.60%	▼4.52
Turnout		126,931	70.69%	▲1.61
Total valid votes		126,675		
Registered electors		179,553		▲10.25
Independent gain from INC		Swing	▲3.76	

=== Assembly Election 2004 ===
2004 Karnataka Legislative Assembly election : Kolar
Party	Candidate	Votes	%	±%
INC	K. Srinivasa Gowda	54,755	48.69%	▲13.32
BJP	Anand. M. S	31,004	27.57%	New
JD(S)	Nisar Ahmed. K. A	21,463	19.09%	▲16.74
JP	Murali Gowda. S. R	3,037	2.70%	New
Independent	Venkatesh. N	752	0.67%	New
Margin of victory		23,751	21.12%	▲1.56
Turnout		112,503	69.08%	▼5.60
Total valid votes		112,445		
Registered electors		162,863		▲8.70
INC gain from JD(U)		Swing	▼6.23	

=== Assembly Election 1999 ===
1999 Karnataka Legislative Assembly election : Kolar
Party	Candidate	Votes	%	±%
JD(U)	K. Srinivasa Gowda	59,017	54.92%	New
INC	Naseer Ahmed	38,004	35.37%	▲5.32
Independent	K. A. Nisar Ahamed	4,082	3.80%	New
Independent	K. R. Shrinivasaiah	2,816	2.62%	New
JD(S)	P. H. Nagaraja	2,526	2.35%	New
Margin of victory		21,013	19.56%	▲5.70
Turnout		111,894	74.68%	▲3.08
Total valid votes		107,451		
Rejected ballots		4,416	3.95%	▲1.98
Registered electors		149,822		▲13.70
JD(U) gain from JD		Swing	▲11.01	

=== Assembly Election 1994 ===
1994 Karnataka Legislative Assembly election : Kolar
Party	Candidate	Votes	%	±%
JD	K. Srinivasa Gowda	40,612	43.91%	▲5.31
INC	K. A. Nisar Ahamed	27,790	30.05%	▼15.47
BJP	K. V. Rangappa	17,769	19.21%	▲18.42
INC	Abdul Khayum	4,798	5.19%	New
Margin of victory		12,822	13.86%	▲6.93
Turnout		94,347	71.60%	▼2.05
Total valid votes		92,490		
Rejected ballots		1,857	1.97%	▼2.66
Registered electors		131,769		▲5.71
JD gain from INC		Swing	▼1.61	

=== Assembly Election 1989 ===
1989 Karnataka Legislative Assembly election : Kolar
Party	Candidate	Votes	%	±%
INC	K. A. Nisar Ahamed	39,860	45.52%	▲13.23
JD	K. R. Shrinivasaiah	33,796	38.60%	New
JP	R. Krishnappa	11,388	13.01%	New
BJP	B. C. Subbaraja Setty	696	0.79%	New
Margin of victory		6,064	6.93%	▼12.76
Turnout		91,816	73.65%	▲2.16
Total valid votes		87,563		
Rejected ballots		4,253	4.63%	▲2.81
Registered electors		124,657		▲31.09
INC gain from JP		Swing	▼6.47	

=== Assembly Election 1985 ===
1985 Karnataka Legislative Assembly election : Kolar
Party	Candidate	Votes	%	±%
JP	K. R. Shrinivasaiah	34,701	51.99%	▼12.89
INC	Abdul Rahim	21,556	32.29%	▲0.27
Independent	P. Venkatagiriappa	8,963	13.43%	New
Independent	V. Venkateshan	570	0.85%	New
Independent	Chandpasha	525	0.79%	New
Margin of victory		13,145	19.69%	▼13.17
Turnout		67,984	71.49%	▼1.41
Total valid votes		66,750		
Rejected ballots		1,234	1.82%	▼0.19
Registered electors		95,096		▲13.00
JP hold		Swing	▼12.89	

=== Assembly Election 1983 ===
1983 Karnataka Legislative Assembly election : Kolar
Party	Candidate	Votes	%	±%
JP	K. R. Shrinivasaiah	39,005	64.88%	▲18.77
INC	Naseer Ahmed	19,250	32.02%	▲27.23
LKD	M. Nanje Gowda	1,464	2.44%	New
Margin of victory		19,755	32.86%	▲32.17
Turnout		61,352	72.90%	▼3.31
Total valid votes		60,116		
Rejected ballots		1,236	2.01%	▼0.57
Registered electors		84,156		▲10.03
JP gain from INC(I)		Swing	▲18.08	

=== Assembly Election 1978 ===
1978 Karnataka Legislative Assembly election : Kolar
Party	Candidate	Votes	%	±%
INC(I)	M. Abdul Latheef	26,576	46.80%	New
JP	P. Venkatagiriappa	26,182	46.11%	New
INC	E. Narayana Gowda	2,721	4.79%	▼42.74
Independent	K. N. Kampaiah	842	1.48%	New
Independent	M. Nanjunda Gowda	463	0.82%	New
Margin of victory		394	0.69%	▼4.15
Turnout		58,289	76.21%	▲26.57
Total valid votes		56,784		
Rejected ballots		1,505	2.58%	▲2.58
Registered electors		76,486		▲20.33
INC(I) gain from INC		Swing	▼0.73	

=== Assembly Election 1972 ===
1972 Mysore State Legislative Assembly election : Kolar
Party	Candidate	Votes	%	±%
INC	D. Venkataramiah	14,639	47.53%	▲17.04
Independent	P. Venkatagiriappa	13,147	42.69%	New
Independent	Md. Fazalulla Sherieff	2,490	8.08%	New
INC(O)	S. Chandraiah	523	1.70%	New
Margin of victory		1,492	4.84%	▼9.23
Turnout		31,553	49.64%	▼8.51
Total valid votes		30,799		
Registered electors		63,562		▲16.24
INC gain from Independent		Swing	▲2.97	

=== Assembly Election 1967 ===
1967 Mysore State Legislative Assembly election : Kolar
Party	Candidate	Votes	%	±%
Independent	P. Venkatagiriappa	13,216	44.56%	New
INC	D. A. Rashid	9,042	30.49%	▼11.73
Independent	K. S. Gowda	3,868	13.04%	New
Independent	G. Pillappa	2,441	8.23%	New
Independent	Chamundi	619	2.09%	New
Independent	V. Venkataramanappa	474	1.60%	New
Margin of victory		4,174	14.07%	▼1.48
Turnout		31,798	58.15%	▼4.22
Total valid votes		29,660		
Registered electors		54,684		▼11.35
Independent hold		Swing	▼13.22	

=== Assembly Election 1962 ===
1962 Mysore State Legislative Assembly election : Kolar
Party	Candidate	Votes	%	±%
Independent	P. Venkatagiriappa	20,898	57.78%	New
INC	D. Abdul Rasheed	15,272	42.22%	▼2.47
Margin of victory		5,626	15.55%	▲4.04
Turnout		38,474	62.37%	▲16.76
Total valid votes		36,170		
Registered electors		61,684		▲19.30
Independent gain from INC		Swing	▲13.09	

=== Assembly Election 1957 ===
1957 Mysore State Legislative Assembly election : Kolar
Party	Candidate	Votes	%	±%
INC	D. Abdul Rasheed	10,539	44.69%	▲15.47
Independent	P. Venkatagiriappa	7,825	33.18%	New
Independent	N. Gopala Rao	4,163	17.65%	New
ABJS	Anche Ramchandrappa	1,058	4.49%	New
Margin of victory		2,714	11.51%	▼5.90
Turnout		23,585	45.61%	▲4.80
Total valid votes		23,585		
Registered electors		51,706		▲29.57
INC gain from Independent		Swing	▼1.93	

=== Assembly Election 1952 ===
1952 Mysore State Legislative Assembly election : Kolar
Party	Candidate	Votes	%	±%
Independent	K. Pattabhiraman	7,593	46.62%	New
INC	K. M. Hussain Sab	4,758	29.22%	New
Independent	P. Venkatagiriappa	3,935	24.16%	New
Margin of victory		2,835	17.41%	
Turnout		16,286	40.81%	
Total valid votes		16,286		
Registered electors		39,906		
Independent win (new seat)				

== See also ==
- Kolar District
- List of constituencies of Karnataka Legislative Assembly
