= Varthur Prakash =

Indian politician (born 1966)

R Varthur Prakash

Member of Legislative Assembly
- In office 25 May 2008 – 12 May 2018
- Preceded by: Srinivasa Gowda
- Succeeded by: Srinivasa Gowda
- Constituency: Kolar constituency

Personal details
- Born: 20 December 1966 (age 59) Kolar
- Party: Bharathiya janatha party(BJP)
- Spouse: Smt Syamala
- Children: 3
- Occupation: Politician
- Website: Sri ram sena KOLAR

R Varthur Prakash (b 1966) is an Indian politician from the state of Karnataka. He is a leader of Bharathiya Janatha Party. He was elected twice as an MLA from Kolar assembly constituency.

== Political career ==
He contested as an independent from Kolar constituency in 2008,2013 and won each time. He worked as Textile minister in D. V. Sadananda Gowda ministry. Also he was minister in Jagadish Shetter Cabinet. But he lost K Sreenivasa Gowda of JDS Party in 2018 AC general elections when he came third. He is the founder of Namma Congress Party. He started New party on 19 December 2017 at Kudala Sangama, Bagalkot district.

His wife Shyamala Prakash (b 1981/82) died of suspected dengue in July 2017.
