= H. S. Mahadeva Prasad =

Indian politician

MLA for Karnataka
- In office 1994–2017
- Preceded by: K. S. Nagarathanamma
- Constituency: Gundlupet

Minister of Co-operation and Sugar of Karnataka
- In office 17 May 2013 – 3 January 2017
- Constituency: Gundlupet

Minister of Kannada and Culture
- In office 2004–2008
- Constituency: Gundlupet

Personal details
- Born: 5 August 1958 Gundlupet, Mysore State, India
- Died: 3 January 2017 (aged 58) Chikkamagaluru, Karnataka, India
- Party: JD, JD(U), JD(S), INC
- Spouse: Dr. M.C. Mohan Kumari (Geetha)
- Profession: Politician

Halahalli Shreekantha Shetti Mahadeva Prasad (5 August 1958 – 3 January 2017) was an Indian politician from the state of Karnataka and five-time Member of the Legislative Assembly from the Gundlupet constituency of the Chamarajanagar district. He first won the Karnataka Legislative Assembly elections in 1994 while representing Janata Dal. He was re-elected in five straight subsequent elections in 1999, 2004, 2008 and 2013. Throughout his political career he had been member of Janata Dal, Janata Dal (United), Janata Dal (Secular) and the Indian National Congress. At the time of his death in January 2017, he was the incumbent state minister for Cooperation and Sugar in the Government of Karnataka led by Siddaramaiah as Chief Minister.

== Early life ==
Prasad was born on 5 August 1958. He received a master's degree in political science.

== Political career ==
Prasad had two failed attempts contesting the 1985 Karnataka Legislative Assembly election as a Janata Party candidate and the 1989 elections as a Janata Dal candidate. As a JD nominee, he won the MLA seat of the Gundlupet constituency in 1994 by defeating C. M. Shivamallappa of INC. He secured 53,724 votes, whereas the runner-up C. M. Shivamallappa of Congress received just 29,668 votes, winning with a large margin of 24,056 votes.

Janata Dal formed the state government in 1994 with H. D. Deve Gowda as Chief Minister. Gowda later resigned from the post to become the Prime Minister of India in 1996 and was succeeded by J. H. Patel in that position until the 1999 elections. Due to internal conflicts, Janata Dal split up and Patel formed the Janata Dal (United) faction in Karnataka and Mahadeva Prasad followed him to the new party. Prasad retained his seat by winning the 1999 assembly elections as JD(U) member, although the party did not win majority in the state. This time Prasad secured 46,757 votes and won the seat with a margin of 24,981 votes, compared to his closest contender H. S. Nanjappa of Congress, who received 21,776 votes.

After the Janata Party split up, Deve Gowda formed a new faction of Janata Dal (Secular). Prasad then switched his allegiance and joined JD(S). He won the 2004 elections for the third straight time from the same constituency. Prasad was Cabinet minister in the N. Dharam Singh-led coalition government and headed the Ministry of Food and Civil Supplies. When H. D. Kumaraswamy became the Chief Minister, Prasad took charge of the office of the Minister for Kannada and Culture.

Prasad later left the JD(S) group and this time joined the Indian National Congress. He won the Gundlupet Assembly seat again in the 2008 elections and "earned a rare distinction" for representing the same constituency four times but as a member of a different political party each time. He won with a close margin of 2,203 votes, receiving 64,824 votes while his opponent C. S. Niranjan Kumar of the Bharatiya Janata Party secured 62,621 votes. He contested the next elections in 2013, winning again with a margin of 7,675 votes by receiving 73,723 votes compared to 66,048 votes received by C. S. Niranjanakumar of Karnataka Janata Paksha. He took charge of state minister for Cooperation and Sugar and was also the in-charge minister of the Chamarajanagar district.

=== Controversies ===
In 2012, a private complaint was filed in a special court alleging misuse by Prasad of his post as MLA to acquire a land site in Chamarajanagar from the Karnataka Housing Board (KHB) in 2002 by allegedly submitting a false declaration of not owning any site in the state of Karnataka. The complaint mentioned that Prasad owned a site at Mysore. Prasad however claimed that he did not own the Mysore site when the Chamarajanagar site was allotted to him in 2002 by the board. Inactions at the lower court had elevated the case to the High Court. In October 2013, the High Court ordered a probe through the Mysore-Chamarajanagar Lokayukta Superintendent of Police. In October 2014, the Lokayukta submitted a report stating that the alleged complaint could attract action under various sections 409, 415, 420, 425 and 13/1 of Code of Criminal Procedure, 1973.

A different complaint was also filed against Prasad for allegedly not declaring 3.22 acres of land in Arepura village of Gundlupet in his election affidavit. In March 2016, Prasad's name had appeared in news after a Right to Information query informed that Prasad had claimed an excessive amount of ₹7.98 lakh (equivalent to ₹11 lakh or US$12,000 in 2023) as travel allowance for commuting between Bengaluru and his constituency for last three years.

In June 2016, Prasad's son Ganesh Prasad was accused of running a granite quarry on government-owned land in Chamarajanagar. He was accused of illegally acquiring approximately 14 acres of land and causing a loss to the state exchequer. The opposing BJP party demanded that Prasad be sacked. Prasad, however, repudiated the claims, calling them "politically motivated".

== Personal life ==
Prasad was married to Dr. M.C. Mohan Kumari (Gita) and had a son H. M. Ganesh Prasad.

He had cardiovascular disease, for which he underwent heart surgery in 2005. In 2015, he underwent angioplasty at Sri Jayadeva Institute of Cardiology, Bengaluru, after experiencing chest pains.

Prasad had a heart attack on 2 January 2017, and was found dead the following day at a private Serai Resort near Chikkamangalur. He had been attending a function in the nearby town of Koppa. His funeral was held in Halahalli village. In an emergency cabinet meeting, Chief Minister Siddaramaiah declared 3 January to be a holiday, and announced three days of state mourning.
