= Prakash Koliwad =

Indian politician

Member of the Karnataka Legislative Assembly
- Incumbent
- Assumed office 15 May 2023
- Preceded by: Arunkumar Guttur
- Constituency: Ranibennur

Personal details
- Born: Prakash Krishnappa Koliwad; 4 April 1969 (age 57) Gudagur, Ranebennur
- Party: Indian National Congress
- Spouse: Poornima Prakash Koliwad
- Children: 2
- Parent(s): K. B. Koliwad, Prabhavati
- Education: Malnad College of Engineering

Prakash Koliwad (born 1969) is an Indian politician from Karnataka. He is an MLA from Ranebennur Assembly constituency which is in Haveri district. He won the 2023 Karnataka Legislative Assembly election representing Indian National Congress.

== Early life and education ==
Koliwad is from Ranebennur, Haveri district. His father Krishnappa Koliwad was 21st speaker of Karnataka Legislative Assembly. He completed his bachelor's degree in Engineering at Malnad Technical College, Hassan in 1991.

== Career ==
Koliwad won from Ranebennur Assembly constituency representing Indian National Congress in the 2023 Karnataka Legislative Assembly election. He polled 71,830 votes and defeated his nearest rival, Arunkumar Guththur of Bharatiya Janata Party, by a margin of 9,800 votes.
