= Samruddhi Manjunath =

Indian politician (born 1983)

Samruddhi V. Manjunath (born 1 June 1983) is an Indian politician from Karnataka. He is a member of the Karnataka Legislative Assembly from Mulbagal Assembly constituency which is reserved for SC community in Kolar district. He represents Janata Dal (Secular) Party and won the 2023 Karnataka Legislative Assembly election.

== Early life and education ==
Manjunath is from Mulbagal, Kolar district. His father later Venkataramappa was a farmer. He completed his pre university course in 2001 from Government Boys Pre University College, Srinivasapura.

== Career ==
Manjunath won from Mulbagal Assembly constituency representing Janata Dal (Secular) party in the 2023 Karnataka Legislative Assembly election. He polled 94,254 votes and defeated his nearest rival, V. Adinarayana of Indian National Congress, by a margin of 26,268 votes.
