= V. Venkatappa =

Indian politician and independence activist (born 1900)

- ವಿ. ವೆಂಕಟಪ್ಪ

Speaker of the Mysore Legislative Assembly
- In office 1950 – 18 June 1952
- Succeeded by: H. Siddaiah

Chairman of the Mysore Legislative Council
- In office 5 November 1958 – 13 May 1960
- Preceded by: P. Seetharamaiah
- Succeeded by: K. V. Narasappa

Minister for Education, Mysore State
- In office April 1957 – April 1958
- Premier: S. Nijalingappa

Member of the Mysore Legislative Assembly
- In office 1952–1957
- Constituency: Channapatna Assembly constituency

Personal details
- Born: 1900 Channapatna, Kingdom of Mysore (now in Bengaluru South district, Karnataka, India)
- Party: Indian National Congress
- Occupation: Politician, educationist

V. Venkatappa (born 1900) was an Indian politician and independence activist who was associated with the Indian National Congress in Mysore State (present-day Karnataka). He served as the first Speaker of the Mysore Legislative Assembly, presiding over the provisional assembly from 1950 to 1952, Minister for Education from April 1957 to April 1958, and Chairman of the Mysore Legislative Council from November 1958 to May 1960.

Elected in 1952 to represent the Channapatna Assembly constituency, Venkatappa also chaired the 1949–1950 Integration and Co-ordination Committee for Local Bodies (the Venkatappa Committee), which recommended a two-tier system of rural local government that formed the statutory framework of the Mysore Village Panchayats and District Boards Act, 1952.

== Early life ==
Venkatappa was born in 1900 in Thittamaranahalli village in Channapatna taluka of Bangalore district (now in Bengaluru South district, Karnataka). He completed his education up to intermediate level. In 1920, he organised the All Mysore Patels' Conference. He joined the Indian National Congress in 1924, participated in the Indian independence movement and was imprisoned for his political activities. In 1928, he organised the All Mysore Youth Conference.

== Political and legislative career ==
=== Local government and Representative Assembly ===
Venkatappa entered public life through local governance institutions, serving on the Bangalore District Board from 1927 to 1940 and as its president from 1929 to 1935. He was elected a member of the Mysore Representative Assembly from 1927 to 1936 and served on the Mysore Legislative Council from 1937 to 1948. He also served on the Mysore Constitutional Reforms Committee in 1938 and was a member of the Mysore Constituent Assembly from 1948 to 1949. In 1949, he was elected the first elected president of the Mysore Representative Assembly.

=== Venkatappa Committee on Local Bodies ===
In 1949, the Government of Mysore appointed the Integration and Co-ordination Committee for Local Bodies under Venkatappa's chairmanship, popularly known as the Venkatappa Committee. The committee was tasked with reviewing the structure of local self-governing bodies in post-independence Mysore and recommending institutional reforms. The committee submitted its report in 1950, recommending a two-tier structure comprising group panchayats at the village level and district boards at the district level, while bypassing the taluk level. The recommendations formed the foundation for the enactment of the Mysore Village Panchayats and District Boards Act, 1952.

=== Speaker and MLA ===
Following the adoption of the Constitution of India in 1950, a provisional Mysore Legislative Assembly was formed. Venkatappa served as Speaker of the provisional assembly from 1950 to 1952. In the 1952 Mysore Legislative Assembly election, the first elections held under adult franchise, Venkatappa was elected as the Congress legislator for the Channapatna Assembly constituency. On 18 June 1952, Venkatappa presided at the inaugural sitting of the newly elected Assembly before H. Siddaiah assumed the office of Speaker. Venkatappa remained a member of the assembly until 1957.

=== Minister for Education and Council Chairman ===
In 1957, Venkatappa was unanimously elected president of the Mysore Pradesh Congress Committee (M.P.C.C.). In April 1957, he was appointed Minister for Education in the cabinet of Chief Minister S. Nijalingappa, serving until April 1958. During his ministerial tenure, he sanctioned University Grants Commission pay scales for college teachers in the state and approved developmental assistance for the Manasagangotri post-graduate campus of the University of Mysore. On 5 November 1958, Venkatappa was elected Chairman of the Mysore Legislative Council, succeeding P. Seetharamaiah. He held the office until 13 May 1960 and was succeeded by K. V. Narasappa. He was later re-elected to the Legislative Council in 1966 and served until 1970.
