= K. S. Nagarathnamma =

Indian politician

K. S. Nagarathanamma

Leader of the opposition in the Karnataka Legislative Assembly
- In office 29 January 1987 – 21 April 1989
- Preceded by: Sarekoppa Bangarappa
- Succeeded by: D. B. Chandregowda

1st 1st speaker of the Karanataka Legislative Assembly
- In office 1 Nov 1973 – 17 March 1978
- Preceded by: position renamed
- Succeeded by: P. Venkataramana

7th Speaker of the Mysore Legislative Assembly

Assembly Member for Gundlupet
- In office 24 March 1972 – 31 Oct 1973
- Preceded by: S. D. Kotavale
- Succeeded by: position renamed
- In office 1957–1978
- Preceded by: New constituency
- Succeeded by: H. K. Shivarudrappa
- In office 1983–1994
- Preceded by: H. K. Shivarudrappa
- Succeeded by: H. S. Mahadeva Prasad

Personal details
- Born: 23 November 1923
- Died: 17 December 1993 (aged 70) Bangalore, Karnataka, India
- Party: Indian National Congress
- Spouse: K. C. Subbanna (m. 1934; died 1947)

Kabballi Subbanna Nagarathanamma (23 November 1923 – 17 October 1993) was an Indian politician from the southern state of Karnataka. She was elected seven times from the Gundlupet constituency to the Karnataka Legislative Assembly. She was the first female speaker of the Karnataka Legislative Assembly, when she served between 1972 and 1978, and also the first female leader of opposition of the Assembly.

== Early life ==
Nagarathanamma was born on 23 November 1923 to Channamma and C. R. Gowda, an engineer, as their eldest of nine children. She had six sisters and two brothers. In 1934, she was married at the age of 11 to K. C. Subbanna (1911–1947). His family resided in Gundlupet, then a part of the Mysore district, and was a family involved in public service and politics. Subbanna served as president of the Gundlupet District Board for nine years before his death in August 1947. Upon being urged by the people of Gundlupet to follow the legacy of public service of the Kabballi family, Nagarathanamma contested the 1957 Mysore Legislative Assembly election from Gundlupet.

== Career ==
Before entering politics, Nagarathanamma served as vice-president of the Bharat Scouts and Guides and senate member of the University of Mysore. In 1957, when the Gundlupet constituency was formed, she contested the election as an independent politician and won upon securing 24,955 votes, whereas her only opponent H. K. Shivarudrappa of the Indian National Congress received 13,053. She thus became the first legislator of the constituency. She again defeated Shivarudrappa in 1962 elections winning 22,765 as against his 20,010 votes. She contested the 1967 elections as member of Indian National Congress and defeated K. B. Jayadevappa with a large margin of 21,423 by securing 30,778 as against his 9,355 votes.

Nagarathanamma retained the constituency for the fourth time in 1972 elections defeating B. Basappa of Indian National Congress (Organisation). She won 30,055 votes and Basappa won 20,255 votes. She was elected as the speaker of the assembly in 1972 till 1978 and became the first female speaker of the house. In the 1978 elections she faced defeat when Shivarudrappa, her long time contender, won by a close margin of 271 votes and received 27,141 votes while both were independent candidates.

The 1983 elections again saw her come back to her seat as INC member by defeating H. N. Srikanta Setty of Janata Party and won 44,085 votes. In the following 1985 elections she defeated H. S. Mahadeva Prasad of Janata Party with a large margin of 19,140 securing 40,857 votes for herself. Between 1987 and 1989, she served as leader of opposition in the Assembly. Nagarathanamma again defeated Prasad in 1989 elections winning 50,643 votes. In 1990, she was appointed Minister for Health and Family Welfare.

Since the 1970s till her death in 1993, Nagarathnamma lived at a farmhouse in Kenchenahalli, nearby Bangalore.

== See also ==
- Women's political participation in India
