= K. B. Koliwad =

Indian politician

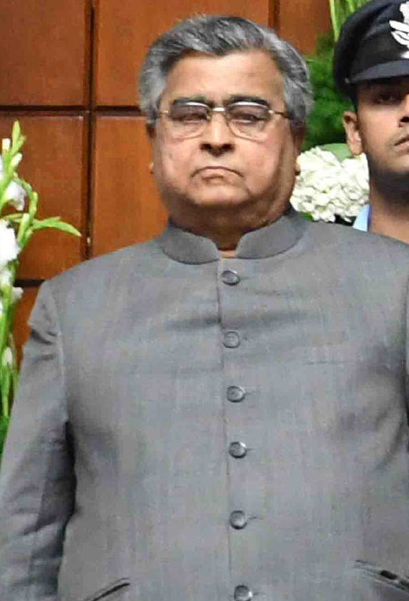

15th Speaker of the Karnataka Legislative Assembly
- In office 2016 – 19 May 2018
- Preceded by: Kagodu Thimmappa
- Succeeded by: K. R. Ramesh Kumar

Personal details
- Born: Krishnappa Bhimappa Koliwad; 1 November 1944 (age 81) Gudagur, Ranebennur, Kingdom of Mysore
- Party: Indian National Congress
- Spouse: Prabhavati
- Children: Prakash Koliwad

Krishnappa Bhimappa Koliwad (born 1 November 1944) is an Indian politician who was the 20th speaker of the Karnataka Legislative Assembly and member of the Indian National Congress from the state of Karnataka. Koliwad is a five-term member of the Karnataka Legislative Assembly. Koliwad was elected Speaker of the Karnataka Legislative Assembly in July 2016 which was vacated by Kagodu Thimmappa who was inducted as a minister in the Siddaramaiah led government of Karnataka. Koliwad was the 20th speaker of the lower house.

== Political life ==
Koliwad is from the Indian National Congress and represents Ranibennur constituency in Haveri district of Karnataka. He was elected to the Karnataka Legislative Assembly for the first time in 1972 beating B. C. Patil of the Indian National Congress (Organisation) by over 11,000 votes. The 1985 elections was more hard-fought as he won against Patil Basanagouda Guranagouda of the Janata Party by 700 votes, narrowly winning the seat. The following election of 1989 he won against the Janata Dal candidate Karjigi Veerappa Sannatammappa by about 2,800 votes. In the 1994 elections he lost to Karjagi Veerappa Sannatammappa by about 25,000 votes due to the 10-year anti-incumbency of the Congress rule in the state. Koliwadi once again retained the Ranibennur Legislative Assembly seat by beating Tilavalli Shivanna Gurappa of the Janata Dal (United) by about 5,000 votes. In 2004 and 2008 he lost both times to Tilavalli Shivanna Gurappa who had joined the Bharatiya Janata Party by then. In 2013 he won the Ranibennur Assembly seat back against R. Shankar who was an independent candidate by about 6,000 votes .In 2018 assembly elections he lost to R.Shanker of KPJP by about 4000 votes. Koliwad is also a member of the Pradesh election committee in the Karnataka Indian National Congress.

== Ministry ==
Koliwad was inducted into the Karnataka cabinet of ministers in the S. M. Krishna-led government in 2002 as the Minister of State for Drinking Water Supply. He has served in many committees in the Karnataka Legislative Assembly. Besides being the Speaker of the Karnataka Legislative Assembly he still holds the chairmanship of the lake committee which was in a controversy over encroachment in the areas around the lake by builders in connivance with civic officials.

== Personal life ==
Koliwad is married to Prabhavati, and has five children together with her. A son, Prakash Koliwad, who is the secretary of Karnataka Pradesh Congress Committee, is a businessman who runs a cloud-seeding company. He runs an NGO PKK trust, where he does social work organizing health camps, singing competitions, job fairs, skill development training, and free ambulance services. Koliwad belongs to the Raddi Lingayat community which is the dominant caste in North Karnataka.
