= C. S. Niranjan Kumar =

Indian politician (born 1973)

C.S. Niranjan Kumar

Member of the Karnataka Legislative Assembly for Gundlupet
- In office 16 May 2018 – 13 May 2023
- Preceded by: Geetha Mahadeva Prasad
- Succeeded by: H. M. Ganesh Prasad

Personal details
- Born: 12 December 1973 (age 52) Karnataka, India
- Party: Bharatiya Janata Party
- Children: 1
- Profession: Politician

C. S. Niranjan Kumar (born 12 December 1973) is an Indian politician who served as a member of the Karnataka Legislative Assembly. He represented the Gundlupet Assembly constituency from 2018 to 2023 as a member of the Bharatiya Janata Party (BJP).

== Early life and education ==
Kumar was born on 12 December 1973 in Karnataka. He pursued his higher education in commerce and completed his Bachelor's degree in Commerce.

== Political career ==
Kumar is a prominent local leader associated with the Bharatiya Janata Party in the Chamarajanagar district region.

=== 2017 By-election ===
Kumar's major entry into the electoral spotlight occurred during the 2017 by-election for the Gundlupet constituency. The by-poll was necessitated by the sudden death of the incumbent minister and five-time MLA, H. S. Mahadeva Prasad. Kumar contested as the BJP candidate against Geetha Mahadeva Prasad (the late minister's wife) of the Indian National Congress. Despite a strong campaign, Kumar was defeated by a margin of 10,887 votes.

=== 2018 General Election ===
In the subsequent 2018 Karnataka Legislative Assembly election, the BJP once again fielded Kumar from the Gundlupet constituency. In a reversal of the previous year's by-poll results, Kumar successfully defeated the incumbent Congress MLA, Geetha Mahadeva Prasad, by a comfortable margin of 16,684 votes, securing his first term in the Karnataka Legislative Assembly.

He served a full five-year term until the 2023 state elections, where he was succeeded by H. M. Ganesh Prasad of the Indian National Congress.

== Personal life ==
Kumar is married and his wife is a homemaker; together they have one son. In May 2020, during his tenure as MLA, Kumar briefly faced media scrutiny when a controversy erupted over his son taking a horse ride on a state highway near Gundlupet during the nationwide COVID-19 pandemic lockdown.
