= Soraba Shikaripur Assembly constituency =

Former Assembly constituency in Karnataka, India

Coordinates: 14.353428°N 75.255382°E

Soraba Shikaripur
- Former constituency for the State Legislative Assembly

Constituency details
- Country: India
- State: Mysore State
- Division: Bangalore
- District: Shimoga
- Lok Sabha constituency: Shimoga
- Established: 1952
- Abolished: 1957

Soraba Shikaripur Assembly constituency was one of the Karnataka Legislative Assemblies or Vidhan Sabha constituencies in Mysore State. It was part of Shimoga Lok Sabha constituency.

== Members of the Legislative Assembly ==
Election	Member	Party
1952	H. Siddaiah	Indian National Congress
1952	Ganganayak	Indian National Congress
1955 By-election (Note: Died in 1954)	Mallikarjunappa Gowda	Indian National Congress

== Election results ==
=== Assembly By-election 1955 ===
1955 Mysore State Legislative Assembly by-election : Soraba Shikaripur
Party	Candidate	Votes	%	±%
INC	Mallikarjunappa Gowda	29,845	58.54%	▲17.05
PSP	D. P. Wodayar	21,140	41.46%	New
Margin of victory		8,705	17.07%	▲9.03
Total valid votes		50,985		
INC hold		Swing	▲37.17	

=== Assembly Election 1952 ===
1952 Mysore State Legislative Assembly election : Soraba Shikaripur
Party	Candidate	Votes	%	±%
INC	H. Siddaiah	20,737	21.37%	New
INC	Ganganayak	19,519	20.12%	New
Socialist	H. Halanaik	12,938	13.33%	New
Socialist	K. H. Mariyappa	12,846	13.24%	New
KMPP	Kadappa Gowda	12,652	13.04%	New
Independent	Lokappa	9,490	9.78%	New
ABJS	Gurunathappa	6,598	6.80%	New
Independent	H. Ganapathipapa	2,255	2.32%	New
Margin of victory		7,799	8.04%	
Turnout		97,035	65.29%	
Total valid votes		97,035		
Registered electors		74,314		
INC win (new seat)				

== See also ==
- Sagar Assembly constituency
- Honnali Assembly constituency
- Tirthahalli Assembly constituency
