= Gundlupet Assembly constituency =

Constituency of the Karnataka legislative assembly in India

Coordinates: 11.81°N 76.69°E

Gundlupet
- Constituency No. 224 for the Karnataka Legislative Assembly

Constituency details
- Country: India
- Region: South India
- State: Karnataka
- Division: Mysore
- District: Chamarajanagar
- Lok Sabha constituency: Chamarajanagar
- Established: 1956
- Total electors: 213,888 (2023)
- Reservation: None

Member of Legislative Assembly
- 16th Karnataka Legislative Assembly
- Incumbent H M Ganesh Prasad
- Party: Indian National Congress
- Elected year: 2023
- Preceded by: C. S. Niranjan Kumar

Gundlupet Assembly constituency is one of the 224 electoral constituencies that form the Karnataka Legislative Assembly in the South Indian state of Karnataka. It is part of Chamarajanagar Lok Sabha constituency.

The constituency was formed in 1957 after Mysore State was reorganized as the result of States Reorganisation Act, 1956. K. S. Nagarathanamma won the first election of 1957, and she went on to be elected six more times. H. K. Shivarudrappa won in 1978 and since 1994 H. S. Mahadeva Prasad has won the seat five times consecutively. Following Prasad's death on 3 January 2017, the by-election was won by M. C. Mohan Kumari.

== Members of the Legislative Assembly ==
Election	Member	Party
1957	K. S. Nagarathnamma	Independent politician
1962	K. S. Nagarathnamma	Independent politician
1967	K. S. Nagarathnamma	Indian National Congress
1972	K. S. Nagarathnamma	Indian National Congress
1978	H. K. Shivarudrappa	Independent politician
1983	K. S. Nagarathnamma	Indian National Congress
1985	K. S. Nagarathnamma	Indian National Congress
1989	K. S. Nagarathnamma	Indian National Congress
1994	H. S. Mahadeva Prasad	Janata Dal
1999	H. S. Mahadeva Prasad	Janata Dal
2004	H. S. Mahadeva Prasad	Janata Dal
2008	H. S. Mahadeva Prasad	Indian National Congress
2013	H. S. Mahadeva Prasad	Indian National Congress
2017 By-election	M. C. Mohan Kumari Uruf Geetha	Indian National Congress
2018	C. S. Niranjan Kumar	Bharatiya Janata Party
2023	H M Ganesh Prasad	Indian National Congress

== Election results ==
=== Assembly Election 2023 ===
2023 Karnataka Legislative Assembly election : Gundlupet
Party	Candidate	Votes	%	±%
INC	H M Ganesh Prasad	107,794	57.34%	▲14.99
BJP	C. S. Niranjan Kumar	71,119	37.83%	▼13.65
Independent	Sunil. M. P	2,227	1.18%	New
JD(S)	Manjunatha. K. S	1,850	0.98%	New
NOTA	None of the above	1,538	0.82%	▲0.15
BSP	D. Govindaraju	1,234	0.66%	▼2.85
Margin of victory		36,675	19.51%	▲10.39
Turnout		188,014	87.90%	▼1.20
Total valid votes		187,995		
Registered electors		213,888		▲4.01
INC gain from BJP		Swing	▲5.86	

=== Assembly Election 2018 ===
2018 Karnataka Legislative Assembly election : Gundlupet
Party	Candidate	Votes	%	±%
BJP	C. S. Niranjan Kumar	94,151	51.48%	▲5.69
INC	M. C. Mohan Kumari Uruf Geetha	77,467	42.35%	▼9.72
BSP	S. Guruprasad	6,412	3.51%	New
Praja Parivartan Party	Kantharaj. C. G	1,419	0.78%	New
NOTA	None of the above	1,231	0.67%	▼0.25
Margin of victory		16,684	9.12%	▲2.85
Turnout		183,230	89.10%	▲1.99
Total valid votes		182,902		
Registered electors		205,646		▲2.37
BJP gain from INC		Swing	▼0.59	

=== Assembly By-election 2017 ===
2017 Karnataka Legislative Assembly by-election : Gundlupet
Party	Candidate	Votes	%	±%
INC	M. C. Mohan Kumari Uruf Geetha	90,260	52.07%	▲6.65
BJP	C. S. Niranjan Kumar	79,383	45.79%	▲44.56
NOTA	None of the above	1,596	0.92%	New
RPI	Shivaraju. M	1,512	0.87%	New
Margin of victory		10,877	6.27%	▲1.54
Turnout		175,000	87.11%	▲1.80
Total valid votes		173,359		
Registered electors		200,891		▲5.50
INC hold		Swing	▲6.65	

=== Assembly Election 2013 ===
2013 Karnataka Legislative Assembly election : Gundlupet
Party	Candidate	Votes	%	±%
INC	H. S. Mahadeva Prasad	73,723	45.42%	▲0.27
KJP	C. S. Niranjan Kumar	66,048	40.69%	New
BSP	Nagendra	6,052	3.73%	▼1.62
JD(S)	B. P. Muddumallu	4,017	2.47%	▼0.42
Samajwadi Janata Party (Karnataka)	G. M. Gadkar	3,123	1.92%	New
Independent	Subhash	3,041	1.87%	New
BJP	H. G. Mallikarjunaswamy	1,989	1.23%	▼42.39
RPI(A)	P. Sanghasena	1,588	0.98%	New
Independent	Maridasaiah	1,546	0.95%	New
Margin of victory		7,675	4.73%	▲3.20
Turnout		162,443	85.31%	▲3.99
Total valid votes		162,326		
Registered electors		190,425		▲7.74
INC hold		Swing	▲0.27	

=== Assembly Election 2008 ===
2008 Karnataka Legislative Assembly election : Gundlupet
Party	Candidate	Votes	%	±%
INC	H. S. Mahadeva Prasad	64,824	45.15%	▲8.70
BJP	C. S. Niranjan Kumar	62,621	43.62%	▲36.95
BSP	Venkataramana Shetty	7,677	5.35%	▼2.38
Independent	Subhash	4,284	2.98%	New
JD(S)	S. Shivabasappa	4,156	2.89%	▼42.67
Margin of victory		2,203	1.53%	▼7.59
Turnout		143,733	81.32%	▲3.71
Total valid votes		143,562		
Registered electors		176,750		▲13.45
INC gain from JD(S)		Swing	▼0.41	

=== Assembly Election 2004 ===
2004 Karnataka Legislative Assembly election : Gundlupet
Party	Candidate	Votes	%	±%
JD(S)	H. S. Mahadeva Prasad	55,076	45.56%	▲32.93
INC	H. S. Nanjappa	44,057	36.45%	▲15.38
BSP	Papanna Shetty	9,344	7.73%	New
BJP	Vrushabendrappa. M. P	8,067	6.67%	New
JP	Lakshmanashetty	4,336	3.59%	New
Margin of victory		11,019	9.12%	▼15.06
Turnout		120,910	77.61%	▲1.25
Total valid votes		120,880		
Registered electors		155,793		▲7.20
JD(S) gain from JD(U)		Swing	▲0.31	

=== Assembly Election 1999 ===
1999 Karnataka Legislative Assembly election : Gundlupet
Party	Candidate	Votes	%	±%
JD(U)	H. S. Mahadeva Prasad	46,757	45.25%	New
INC	H. S. Nanjappa	21,776	21.07%	▼7.00
Independent	C. M. Shivamallappa	21,748	21.05%	New
JD(S)	Muniraju. B. M	13,049	12.63%	New
Margin of victory		24,981	24.18%	▲1.42
Turnout		110,975	76.36%	▼4.06
Total valid votes		103,330		
Rejected ballots		7,645	6.89%	▲4.62
Registered electors		145,329		▲8.08
JD(U) gain from JD		Swing	▼5.58	

=== Assembly Election 1994 ===
1994 Karnataka Legislative Assembly election : Gundlupet
Party	Candidate	Votes	%	±%
JD	H. S. Mahadeva Prasad	53,724	50.83%	▲14.12
INC	C. M. Shivamallappa	29,668	28.07%	▼28.99
INC	M. Puttaranga Naik	11,917	11.28%	New
KRRS	K. R. Lokesh	4,798	4.54%	New
BJP	Dr. Girija Maheshan	4,206	3.98%	New
JP	A. Madaiah	740	0.70%	New
Margin of victory		24,056	22.76%	▲2.42
Turnout		108,138	80.42%	▲2.83
Total valid votes		105,686		
Rejected ballots		2,452	2.27%	▼4.74
Registered electors		134,464		▲9.30
JD gain from INC		Swing	▼6.23	

=== Assembly Election 1989 ===
1989 Karnataka Legislative Assembly election : Gundlupet
Party	Candidate	Votes	%	±%
INC	K. S. Nagarathnamma	50,643	57.06%	▼3.77
JD	H. S. Mahadeva Prasad	32,587	36.71%	New
Independent	C. K. Lingachar	1,902	2.14%	New
JP	Shankarlingegowda	1,247	1.40%	New
Kranti Sabha	K. R. Lokesh	965	1.09%	New
Independent	Puttalingaiah	959	1.08%	New
Margin of victory		18,056	20.34%	▼8.16
Turnout		95,451	77.59%	▲5.79
Total valid votes		88,760		
Rejected ballots		6,691	7.01%	▲4.89
Registered electors		123,021		▲28.72
INC hold		Swing	▼3.77	

=== Assembly Election 1985 ===
1985 Karnataka Legislative Assembly election : Gundlupet
Party	Candidate	Votes	%	±%
INC	K. S. Nagarathnamma	40,857	60.83%	▼1.62
JP	H. S. Mahadeva Prasad	21,717	32.34%	▼3.68
Independent	Shankarlingegowda	1,755	2.61%	New
Independent	V. Mallappa	1,188	1.77%	New
Independent	S. M. Chikkanna	894	1.33%	New
Margin of victory		19,140	28.50%	▲2.07
Turnout		68,619	71.80%	▼7.02
Total valid votes		67,162		
Rejected ballots		1,457	2.12%	▼0.31
Registered electors		95,573		▲4.13
INC hold		Swing	▼1.62	

=== Assembly Election 1983 ===
1983 Karnataka Legislative Assembly election : Gundlupet
Party	Candidate	Votes	%	±%
INC	K. S. Nagarathnamma	44,085	62.45%	New
JP	H. N. Srikanta Shetty	25,427	36.02%	New
BJP	M. N. Guruswamy	1,075	1.52%	New
Margin of victory		18,658	26.43%	▲26.04
Turnout		72,344	78.82%	▼4.20
Total valid votes		70,587		
Rejected ballots		1,757	2.43%	▼0.43
Registered electors		91,782		▲7.85
INC gain from Independent		Swing	▲22.90	

=== Assembly Election 1978 ===
1978 Karnataka Legislative Assembly election : Gundlupet
Party	Candidate	Votes	%	±%
Independent	H. K. Shivarudrappa	27,141	39.55%	New
Independent	K. S. Nagarathnamma	26,870	39.15%	New
INC(I)	H. N. Srikanta Shetty	11,438	16.67%	New
Independent	P. Shankara	1,815	2.64%	New
Independent	A. Siddaraju	1,366	1.99%	New
Margin of victory		271	0.39%	▼19.09
Turnout		70,648	83.02%	▲12.29
Total valid votes		68,630		
Rejected ballots		2,018	2.86%	▲2.86
Registered electors		85,101		▲15.21
Independent gain from INC		Swing	▼20.19	

=== Assembly Election 1972 ===
1972 Mysore State Legislative Assembly election : Gundlupet
Party	Candidate	Votes	%	±%
INC	K. S. Nagarathnamma	30,055	59.74%	▼16.95
INC(O)	B. Basappa	20,255	40.26%	New
Margin of victory		9,800	19.48%	▼33.90
Turnout		52,246	70.73%	▲3.09
Total valid votes		50,310		
Registered electors		73,868		▲15.83
INC hold		Swing	▼16.95	

=== Assembly Election 1967 ===
1967 Mysore State Legislative Assembly election : Gundlupet
Party	Candidate	Votes	%	±%
INC	K. S. Nagarathnamma	30,778	76.69%	▲29.91
Independent	K. B. Jayadevappa	9,355	23.31%	New
Margin of victory		21,423	53.38%	▲46.94
Turnout		43,139	67.64%	▼8.85
Total valid votes		40,133		
Registered electors		63,773		▲7.82
INC gain from Independent		Swing	▲23.47	

=== Assembly Election 1962 ===
1962 Mysore State Legislative Assembly election : Gundlupet
Party	Candidate	Votes	%	±%
Independent	K. S. Nagarathnamma	22,765	53.22%	New
INC	H. K. Shivarudrappa	20,010	46.78%	▲12.44
Margin of victory		2,755	6.44%	▼24.87
Turnout		45,239	76.49%	▲3.75
Total valid votes		42,775		
Registered electors		59,147		▲13.19
Independent hold		Swing	▼12.44	

=== Assembly Election 1957 ===
1957 Mysore State Legislative Assembly election : Gundlupet
Party	Candidate	Votes	%	±%
Independent	K. S. Nagarathnamma	24,955	65.66%	New
INC	H. K. Shivarudrappa	13,053	34.34%	New
Margin of victory		11,902	31.31%	
Turnout		38,008	72.74%	
Total valid votes		38,008		
Registered electors		52,255		
Independent win (new seat)				
