= K. R. Ramesh Kumar =

Indian politician (born 1949)

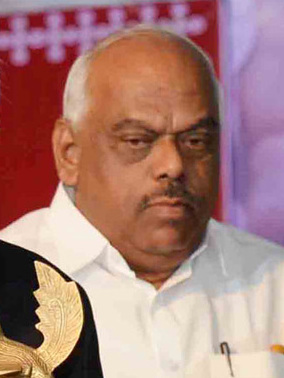

9th Speaker of the Karnataka Legislative Assembly
- In office 25 May 2018 – 29 July 2019
- Preceded by: K. B. Koliwad
- Succeeded by: Vishweshwar Hegde Kageri
- In office 27 December 1994 – 24 October 1999
- Preceded by: V. S. Koujalagi
- Succeeded by: M. V. Venkatappa

Minister of Health and Family Welfare of Karnataka
- In office 13 September 2016 – 23 May 2018
- Preceded by: U. T. Khader
- Succeeded by: Shivanand Patil

Personal details
- Born: 22 November 1949 (age 76) Addagal, Srinivaspur, Kolar, Mysore State, India
- Party: Indian National Congress
- Other political affiliations: All India Progressive Janata Dal
- Education: Bachelor of Science
- Occupation: Politician
- Profession: Agriculturist

Kanadam Ramaiah Ramesh Kumar (born 22 November 1949) is an Indian politician who was the 9th and 16th speaker of Karnataka Legislative Assembly and member of the Indian National Congress from the state of Karnataka.

He is a six-term member of the Karnataka Legislative Assembly from Srinivaspur assembly constituency in Kolar district. He met Devaraj Urs during student days and was encouraged to enter politics. In 1994, he became Speaker of the assembly for his first experience with that post. In June 2016, he was inducted into the Siddaramaiah-led government of Karnataka as a cabinet minister. He held the Health and Family Welfare Ministry portfolio in the Government of Karnataka. He was elected unopposed as the speaker of 15th Karnataka Legislative Assembly in 2018 after JD(S) and Congress unity.

== Political life ==
Ramesh Kumar is from the INC and represents Srinivaspur constituency of Kolar district, Karnataka. Ramesh Kumar started his political career in the seventies with the INC. He later joined the JP in the mid-1980s and joined the Janata Dal in the 1990s. In the early 2000s he came back into the INC. He acted in Mukta Mukta.

== Electoral history ==
- Ramesh Kumar won his first Karnataka Legislative Assembly election in 1978 by beating R. G. Narayanareddy by over 18,000 votes. Ramesh Kumar fought on an INC ticket. Devaraj Urs had encouraged him to enter politics.
- In the following Karnataka Legislative Assembly election of 1983 he contested as an independent, and lost the election to G. K. Venkata Shiva Reddy of Congress by a narrow margin of only about 700 votes.
- In the 1985 election Ramesh Kumar stood on a JP ticket and won the seat by about 7,000 votes beating G. K. Venkata Shiva Reddy of the INC.
- In the 1989 election Ramesh Kumar lost the seat to G. K. Venkata Shiva Reddy of the INC by about 8,000 votes.
- In the following 1994 election Ramesh Kumar stood on a JD ticket and won the seat by about 4,000 votes defeating G. K. Venkata Shiva Reddy of the INC. He was elected Speaker of the assembly.
- In the 1999 election Ramesh Kumar stood as an independent candidate and lost the assembly seat to G. K. Venkata Shiva Reddy of the INC by about 1,000 votes.
- In the 2004 election Ramesh Kumar joined the INC and fought on their ticket winning by over 8,000 votes against G. K. Venkata Shiva Reddy who had by then joined the BJP.
- The 2008 election Ramesh Kumar fought on an INC ticket and lost his assembly seat by about 3,500 votes to G. K. Venkata Shiva Reddy who was on a JD(S) ticket.
- Ramesh Kumar is a sitting member of the Karnataka Legislative Assembly as he won the 2013 assembly election on an INC ticket beating G. K. Venkata Shiva Reddy of the JD(S) by 3,000 votes.
- In 2018 assembly election he again won successively on an INC beating G. K. Venkata Shiva Reddy of JD(S) by 10,373 votes. This was the ninth successive time that Ramesh Kumar and G. K. Venkata Shiva Reddy had contested this seat against each other and the only time Kumar had been elected consecutively. He was elected Speaker for the second time in 2018. After the JD-S and Congress coalition government collapsed, he resigned from his post in 2019.
- In the 2023 assembly election he lost his seat to G. K. Venkata Shiva Reddy by a margin of around 10,000 votes, and the state saw a historic contest between the two for the 10th time facing each other.

== Membership of Legislature ==
SI No.	Year	Constituency	Tenure	Party
1.	1978	Srinivaspur	1978–1983	Indian National Congress
2.	1985	Srinivaspur	1985–1989	Janata Party
3.	1994	Srinivaspur	1994–1999	Janata Dal
4.	2004	Srinivaspur	2004–2008	Indian National Congress
5.	2013	Srinivaspur	2013–2018	Indian National Congress
6.	2018	Srinivaspur	2018–2023	Indian National Congress

== Positions held in Government of Karnataka ==
SI No.	Post	Tenure
1.	Speaker of the Karnataka Legislative Assembly.	1994–1999
2.	Minister of Health and Family Welfare.	2016–2018
3.	Speaker of the Karnataka Legislative Assembly.	2018–2019

== Ministry ==
Besides holding the Health and Family Welfare Ministry portfolio Ramesh Kumar in his forty-year political career has held many posts in the Karnataka Legislative Assembly and the Government of Karnataka. Ramesh Kumar was the Speaker of the Karnataka Legislative Assembly from 27 December 1994 to 24 October 1999.

== Controversy ==
In 2019, Ramesh Kumar made a statement in the Assembly where he compared himself with a rape survivor having to undergo repeated questioning during the discussion on the controversial audio clips that allegedly mentioned his name for taking Rs. 5 Billion. After facing backlash from various women legislators, activists and the media, he apologized to the MLAs later, clarifying it as a media hype.

In 2021, Ramesh Kumar made a statement in the Karnataka assembly, "When rape is inevitable, lie down and enjoy." Criticism of Kumar's comments came from his own party members.
