= Srinivasapur Assembly constituency =

Legislative Assembly constituency in Karnataka, India

Coordinates: 13.08°N 77.34°E

Srinivaspur
- Constituency No. 144 for the Karnataka Legislative Assembly

Constituency details
- Country: India
- Region: South India
- State: Karnataka
- District: Kolar
- Lok Sabha constituency: Kolar
- Established: 1961
- Total electors: 209,846
- Reservation: None

Member of Legislative Assembly
- 16th Karnataka Legislative Assembly
- Incumbent G. K. Venkatashiva Reddy
- Party: JD(S)
- Alliance: NDA
- Elected year: 2023
- Preceded by: K. R. Ramesh Kumar

Srinivaspur Assembly constituency is one of the seats in Karnataka Legislative Assembly in India. It is part of Kolar Lok Sabha constituency. Venkata Shiva Reddy is the incumbent MLA, elected in 2023.

The election in 2023 was the tenth consecutive time that K. R. Ramesh Kumar and Venkata Shiva Reddy had contested against each other, K. R. Ramesh Kumar winning five times and Venkata Shiva Reddy also winning five times. Ramesh Kumar has won this seat one more time but against another candidate. K. R. Ramesh Kumar became speaker of the assembly in 2018, and was in the news when a no-onfidence motion against H. D. Kumaraswamy in 2019 dragged out too long, resulting in a clash between the governor and the government. K. R. Ramesh Kumar stepped down as speaker after his coalition was reduced to a minority.

== Members of the Legislative Assembly ==
Election	Member	Party
1962	G. Narayana Gowda	Indian National Congress
1967	B. L. Narayanswamy	Independent politician
1972	S. Bachi Reddy	Indian National Congress
1978	K. R. Ramesh Kumar	Indian National Congress
1983	G. K. Venkatashiva Reddy	Indian National Congress
1985	K. R. Ramesh Kumar	Janata Party
1989	G. K. Venkatashiva Reddy	Indian National Congress
1994	K. R. Ramesh Kumar	Janata Dal
1999	G. K. Venkatashiva Reddy	Indian National Congress
2004	K. R. Ramesh Kumar	Indian National Congress
2008	G. K. Venkatashiva Reddy	Janata Dal
2013	K. R. Ramesh Kumar	Indian National Congress
2018	K. R. Ramesh Kumar	Indian National Congress
2023	G. K. Venkatashiva Reddy	Janata Dal

== Election results ==
=== Assembly Election 2023 ===
2023 Karnataka Legislative Assembly election : Srinivasapur
Party	Candidate	Votes	%	±%
JD(S)	G. K. Venkatashiva Reddy	95,463	49.99	▲5.00
INC	K. R. Ramesh Kumar	85,020	44.52	▼6.19
BJP	Gunjuru R. Srinivasareddy	6,644	3.48	▲1.20
AAP	Y. V. Venkatachala	2,086	1.09	New
NOTA	None of the above	678	0.36	▼0.01
Margin of victory		10,443	5.47	▼0.25
Turnout		192,681	88.89	▼0.75
Total valid votes		190,972		
Registered electors		216,763		▲5.22
JD(S) gain from INC		Swing	▼0.72	

=== Assembly Election 2018 ===
2018 Karnataka Legislative Assembly election : Srinivasapur
Party	Candidate	Votes	%	±%
INC	K. R. Ramesh Kumar	93,571	50.71	▼9.44
JD(S)	G. K. Venkatashiva Reddy	83,019	44.99	▼12.35
BJP	Dr. Venu Gopal. K. N	4,208	2.28	▲0.56
NOTA	None of the above	689	0.37	New
Margin of victory		10,552	5.72	▲2.91
Turnout		184,655	89.64	▲1.17
Total valid votes		184,508		
Registered electors		206,007		▲7.92
INC hold		Swing	▼9.44	

=== Assembly Election 2013 ===
2013 Karnataka Legislative Assembly election : Srinivasapur
Party	Candidate	Votes	%	±%
INC	K. R. Ramesh Kumar	83,426	60.15	▲15.05
JD(S)	G. K. Venkatashiva Reddy	79,533	57.34	▲9.76
BJP	V. Venkategowda	2,379	1.72	▼0.87
Independent	K. S. Mallikarjuna	1,005	0.72	New
Margin of victory		3,893	2.81	▲0.33
Turnout		168,888	88.47	▲4.65
Total valid votes		138,700		
Registered electors		190,892		▲7.90
INC gain from JD(S)		Swing	▲12.57	

=== Assembly Election 2008 ===
2008 Karnataka Legislative Assembly election : Srinivasapur
Party	Candidate	Votes	%	±%
JD(S)	G. K. Venkatashiva Reddy	70,282	47.58	▲46.51
INC	K. R. Ramesh Kumar	66,613	45.10	▼7.60
BJP	M. Lakshmana Gowda	3,825	2.59	▼43.13
Independent	S. Basavalingaiah	2,554	1.73	New
BSP	Manjunatha. V	1,425	0.96	New
SP	M. P. Venkataramana	969	0.66	New
Independent	D. R. Shankara Reddy	940	0.64	New
Margin of victory		3,669	2.48	▼4.50
Turnout		148,291	83.82	▲0.97
Total valid votes		147,701		
Registered electors		176,910		▲18.75
JD(S) gain from INC		Swing	▼5.12	

=== Assembly Election 2004 ===
2004 Karnataka Legislative Assembly election : Srinivasapur
Party	Candidate	Votes	%	±%
INC	K. R. Ramesh Kumar	65,041	52.70	▲3.28
BJP	G. K. Venkatashiva Reddy	56,431	45.72	New
JD(S)	Suresh. H. J	1,320	1.07	▲0.14
Margin of victory		8,610	6.98	▲5.86
Turnout		123,431	82.85	▲1.29
Total valid votes		123,423		
Registered electors		148,980		▲10.91
INC hold		Swing	▲3.28	

=== Assembly Election 1999 ===
1999 Karnataka Legislative Assembly election : Srinivasapur
Party	Candidate	Votes	%	±%
INC	G. K. Venkatashiva Reddy	52,490	49.42	▲2.37
Independent	K. R. Ramesh Kumar	51,297	48.30	New
Independent	B. Narayana Swamy	1,051	0.99	New
JD(S)	Ramakrishnappa	990	0.93	New
Margin of victory		1,193	1.12	▼2.93
Turnout		109,557	81.56	▼3.56
Total valid votes		106,204		
Rejected ballots		3,346	3.05	▲2.00
Registered electors		134,326		▲10.55
INC gain from JD		Swing	▼1.68	

=== Assembly Election 1994 ===
1994 Karnataka Legislative Assembly election : Srinivasapur
Party	Candidate	Votes	%	±%
JD	K. R. Ramesh Kumar	52,304	51.10	▲6.82
INC	G. K. Venkatashiva Reddy	48,157	47.05	▼7.80
BJP	T. Narayanaswamy	1,002	0.98	New
Margin of victory		4,147	4.05	▼6.52
Turnout		103,432	85.12	▲0.92
Total valid votes		102,348		
Rejected ballots		1,084	1.05	▼2.18
Registered electors		121,512		▲12.60
JD gain from INC		Swing	▼3.75	

=== Assembly Election 1989 ===
1989 Karnataka Legislative Assembly election : Srinivasapur
Party	Candidate	Votes	%	±%
INC	G. K. Venkatashiva Reddy	48,231	54.85	▲9.63
JD	K. R. Ramesh Kumar	38,938	44.28	New
Margin of victory		9,293	10.57	▲1.89
Turnout		90,868	84.20	▲2.30
Total valid votes		87,932		
Rejected ballots		2,936	3.23	▲1.66
Registered electors		107,918		▲23.16
INC gain from JP		Swing	▲0.95	

=== Assembly Election 1985 ===
1985 Karnataka Legislative Assembly election : Srinivasapur
Party	Candidate	Votes	%	±%
JP	K. R. Ramesh Kumar	38,074	53.90	▲52.70
INC	G. K. Venkatashiva Reddy	31,941	45.22	▼4.08
Independent	Chickka Venkatashamy Reddy	623	0.88	New
Margin of victory		6,133	8.68	▲7.63
Turnout		71,763	81.90	▲3.17
Total valid votes		70,638		
Rejected ballots		1,125	1.57	▼0.25
Registered electors		87,625		▲11.18
JP gain from INC		Swing	▲4.60	

=== Assembly Election 1983 ===
1983 Karnataka Legislative Assembly election : Srinivasapur
Party	Candidate	Votes	%	±%
INC	G. K. Venkatashiva Reddy	30,031	49.30	▲27.01
Independent	K. R. Ramesh Kumar	29,389	48.24	New
JP	M. Chowdappa	729	1.20	▼16.18
Independent	Poola Pamappa	426	0.70	New
Margin of victory		642	1.05	▼35.52
Turnout		62,050	78.73	▲1.56
Total valid votes		60,920		
Rejected ballots		1,130	1.82	▼0.92
Registered electors		78,815		▲9.26
INC gain from INC(I)		Swing	▼9.56	

=== Assembly Election 1978 ===
1978 Karnataka Legislative Assembly election : Srinivasapur
Party	Candidate	Votes	%	±%
INC(I)	K. R. Ramesh Kumar	31,867	58.86	New
INC	R. G. Narayanareddy	12,067	22.29	▼6.08
JP	H. Rahimansharif	9,409	17.38	New
Independent	V. Ramadrishnappa	800	1.48	New
Margin of victory		19,800	36.57	▼6.70
Turnout		55,668	77.17	▲17.27
Total valid votes		54,143		
Rejected ballots		1,525	2.74	▲2.74
Registered electors		72,134		▲2.29
INC(I) gain from INC(O)		Swing	▼12.77	

=== Assembly Election 1972 ===
1972 Mysore State Legislative Assembly election : Srinivasapur
Party	Candidate	Votes	%	±%
INC(O)	S. Bachi Reddy	29,616	71.63	New
INC	H. Syed Abdul Aleem	11,728	28.37	▼17.75
Margin of victory		17,888	43.27	▲35.51
Turnout		42,237	59.90	▲0.57
Total valid votes		41,344		
Registered electors		70,516		▲13.71
INC(O) gain from Independent		Swing	▲17.75	

=== Assembly Election 1967 ===
1967 Mysore State Legislative Assembly election : Srinivasapur
Party	Candidate	Votes	%	±%
Independent	B. L. Narayanswamy	18,801	53.88	New
INC	S. B. Reddy	16,094	46.12	▼11.27
Margin of victory		2,707	7.76	▼7.01
Turnout		36,791	59.33	▼2.61
Total valid votes		34,895		
Registered electors		62,015		▲3.20
Independent gain from INC		Swing	▼3.51	

=== Assembly Election 1962 ===
1962 Mysore State Legislative Assembly election : Srinivasapur
Party	Candidate	Votes	%	±%
INC	G. Narayana Gowda	20,311	57.39	New
Independent	B. L. Narayanaswamy	15,082	42.61	New
Margin of victory		5,229	14.77	
Turnout		37,217	61.94	
Total valid votes		35,393		
Registered electors		60,090		
INC win (new seat)				

== See also ==
- Kolar District
- List of constituencies of Karnataka Legislative Assembly
