= H. Siddaiah =

Indian politician

2nd Speaker of Karnataka Legislative Assembly
- In office 18 June 1952 – 14 May 1954
- Preceded by: V. Venkatappa
- Succeeded by: H. S. Rudrappa
- Constituency: Soraba-Shikaripur

Minister for Revenue
- In office 25 October 1947 – 30 March 1952
- Constituency: Legislative Assembly not established

Minister for Public Works Department
- In office 25 October 1947 – 30 March 1952
- Constituency: Legislative Assembly not established

Member of the Mysore Legislative Assembly
- In office April 1952 – 14 May 1954 Serving with Ganga Nayak
- Preceded by: Legislative Assembly not established
- Succeeded by: Mallikarjunappa Gowda
- Constituency: Soraba-Shikaripur

Personal details
- Died: 14 May 1954
- Party: Indian National Congress

H. Siddaiah was an Indian politician from Indian state of Mysore, currently known as Karnataka.

== Political career ==
He was the Minister of Mysore state for Public Works Department and Revenue department of Karnataka from 25 October 1947 to 30 March 1952 as part of the K. C. Reddy ministry. Later he became the Speaker of Mysore Legislative Assembly from 18 June 1952 and died on 14 May 1954 after winning 1952 Mysore State Legislative Assembly election for Soraba-Shikaripur.
