= Mulbagal Assembly constituency =

State assembly constituency in Karnataka, India

Coordinates: 13.16°N 78.39°E

Mulbagal
- Constituency No. 145 for the Karnataka Legislative Assembly

Constituency details
- Country: India
- Region: South India
- State: Karnataka
- District: Kolar
- Lok Sabha constituency: Kolar
- Established: 1956
- Total electors: 209,846
- Reservation: SC

Member of Legislative Assembly
- 16th Karnataka Legislative Assembly
- Incumbent Samruddhi Manjunath
- Party: JD(S)
- Alliance: NDA
- Elected year: 2023
- Preceded by: H. Nagesh

Mulbagal Assembly constituency is one of the 224 constituencies in the Karnataka Legislative Assembly of Karnataka, a southern state of India. It is also part of Kolar Lok Sabha constituency.

== Members of Legislative Assembly ==
Year	Member	Political party
1952	G. Narayana Gowda	Indian National Congress
1952	T. Channaiah	Indian National Congress
1957	B. L. Narayana Swamy	Independent politician
1957	J. Narayanappa. A	Indian National Congress
1962	J. Narayanappa. A	Indian National Congress
1967	T. Channaiah	Indian National Congress
1972	P. Muniyappa	Independent politician
1978	J. M. Reddy	Indian National Congress (I)
1983	Beere Gowda	Independent politician
1985	R. Venkataramaiah	Communist Party of India (Marxist)
1989	M. V. Venkatappa	Indian National Congress
1994	R. Srinivas	Janata Dal
1999	M. V. Venkatappa	Indian National Congress
2004	R. Srinivas	Janata Dal (Secular)
2008	Amaresh	Indian National Congress
2013	Kothur G. Manjunath	Independent politician
2018	H. Nagesh	Independent politician
2023	Samruddhi Manjunath	Janata Dal (Secular)

== Election results ==
=== Assembly Election 2023 ===
2023 Karnataka Legislative Assembly election : Mulbagal
Party	Candidate	Votes	%	±%
JD(S)	Samruddhi Manjunath	94,254	53.40	▲12.37
INC	V. Adinarayana	67,986	38.52	New
BJP	K. Sunder Raj Sheegehalli Sunder	9,163	5.19	▲0.08
AAP	Dr. Sangasandra Vijayakumar	2,762	1.56	New
NOTA	None of the above	922	0.52	▲0.13
Margin of victory		26,268	14.88	▲10.80
Turnout		176,807	81.61	▲0.63
Total valid votes		176,501		
Registered electors		216,636		▲6.50
JD(S) gain from Independent		Swing	▲8.28	

=== Assembly Election 2018 ===
2018 Karnataka Legislative Assembly election : Mulbagal
Party	Candidate	Votes	%	±%
Independent	H. Nagesh	74,213	45.12	New
JD(S)	Samruddhi Manjunath	67,498	41.03	▲7.45
BJP	Amaresh	8,411	5.11	▲3.09
Independent	V. Marappa	1,009	0.61	New
Independent	K. Nagaraju	1,001	0.61	New
NOTA	None of the above	646	0.39	New
Margin of victory		6,715	4.08	▼24.66
Turnout		164,725	80.98	▲0.03
Total valid votes		164,490		
Registered electors		203,419		▲18.61
Independent hold		Swing	▼17.20	

=== Assembly Election 2013 ===
2013 Karnataka Legislative Assembly election : Mulbagal
Party	Candidate	Votes	%	±%
Independent	Kothur G. Manjunath	73,146	62.32	New
JD(S)	N. Munianjappa	39,412	33.58	▲7.76
INC	Amaresh	11,491	9.79	▼17.63
CPI	M. N. Ambarish	2,450	2.09	▼0.68
BJP	Y. Sreenivasan Patapat	2,376	2.02	▼7.62
Independent	V. Adinarayana	1,547	1.32	New
Independent	D. Venkataravanappa	1,289	1.10	New
Independent	G. Venkataravana	1,019	0.87	New
Independent	G. Alanguru Ramanna	1,008	0.86	New
Margin of victory		33,734	28.74	▲27.14
Turnout		138,835	80.95	▲12.47
Total valid votes		117,374		
Registered electors		171,499		▲2.94
Independent gain from INC		Swing	▲34.90	

=== Assembly Election 2008 ===
2008 Karnataka Legislative Assembly election : Mulbagal
Party	Candidate	Votes	%	±%
INC	Amaresh	31,280	27.42	▲9.96
JD(S)	N. Munianjappa	29,452	25.82	▼12.10
Independent	Doddachowdappa	20,979	18.39	New
BJP	C. Munikrishna	11,002	9.64	▼16.12
CPI	T. Radhakrishna	3,158	2.77	▼1.91
Independent	V. Venkatamuni	2,844	2.49	New
Independent	Ganeshappa	2,429	2.13	New
Independent	M. Venkataswamy	1,331	1.17	New
Independent	Singapur Govind	1,081	0.95	New
Margin of victory		1,828	1.60	▼10.57
Turnout		114,091	68.48	▼0.48
Total valid votes		114,073		
Registered electors		166,594		▼9.73
INC gain from JD(S)		Swing	▼10.50	

=== Assembly Election 2004 ===
2004 Karnataka Legislative Assembly election : Mulbagal
Party	Candidate	Votes	%	±%
JD(S)	R. Srinivas	48,250	37.92	▲13.33
BJP	Y. Surendra	32,772	25.76	▲8.49
INC	M. V. Venkatappa	22,215	17.46	▼17.65
JP	K. V. Shankarappa	12,360	9.71	New
CPI	Gopala. M	5,959	4.68	New
Independent	Govindu. S	2,502	1.97	New
Kannada Nadu Party	Shankarappa. T. R	1,069	0.84	New
BSP	Batheppa. B. M	899	0.71	New
Independent	Muniyappa. V	798	0.63	New
Margin of victory		15,478	12.17	▲1.66
Turnout		127,275	68.96	▼5.54
Total valid votes		127,226		
Registered electors		184,552		▲14.91
JD(S) gain from INC		Swing	▲2.81	

=== Assembly Election 1999 ===
1999 Karnataka Legislative Assembly election : Mulbagal
Party	Candidate	Votes	%	±%
INC	M. V. Venkatappa	39,722	35.11	▼2.23
JD(S)	R. Srinivas	27,826	24.59	New
Independent	Mandikal Venkatesh	20,849	18.43	New
BJP	Y. Surendra	19,541	17.27	▲10.72
Independent	Govindu. S	4,237	3.74	New
Margin of victory		11,896	10.51	▲6.45
Turnout		119,645	74.50	▼1.37
Total valid votes		113,150		
Rejected ballots		6,424	5.37	▲3.70
Registered electors		160,600		▲11.96
INC gain from JD		Swing	▼6.29	

=== Assembly Election 1994 ===
1994 Karnataka Legislative Assembly election : Mulbagal
Party	Candidate	Votes	%	±%
JD	R. Srinivas	44,297	41.40	New
INC	M. V. Venkatappa	39,954	37.34	▲0.51
CPI(M)	H. N. Nagamohandas	8,896	8.31	▼7.45
BJP	M. P. Raghunath	7,008	6.55	New
Independent	Govindu. S	3,362	3.14	New
INC	G. Hanumanth Reddy	1,658	1.55	New
Margin of victory		4,343	4.06	▼9.77
Turnout		108,822	75.87	▲2.85
Total valid votes		107,004		
Rejected ballots		1,818	1.67	▼5.48
Registered electors		143,439		▲7.59
JD gain from INC		Swing	▲4.57	

=== Assembly Election 1989 ===
1989 Karnataka Legislative Assembly election : Mulbagal
Party	Candidate	Votes	%	±%
INC	M. V. Venkatappa	33,285	36.83	▲6.42
JP	K. V. Shankarappa	20,787	23.00	New
CPI(M)	H. N. Nagamohandas	14,243	15.76	▼47.28
Independent	R. Srinivas	10,789	11.94	New
Independent	Govindu. S	8,675	9.60	New
Independent	Mohamed Hanif	1,282	1.42	New
Independent	P. S. Narayana Gowda	608	0.67	New
Margin of victory		12,498	13.83	▼18.79
Turnout		97,343	73.02	▲4.49
Total valid votes		90,381		
Rejected ballots		6,962	7.15	▲5.26
Registered electors		133,314		▲32.28
INC gain from CPI(M)		Swing	▼26.21	

=== Assembly Election 1985 ===
1985 Karnataka Legislative Assembly election : Mulbagal
Party	Candidate	Votes	%	±%
CPI(M)	R. Venkataramaiah	42,712	63.04	New
INC	M. V. Prameelamma	20,608	30.41	▲4.34
Independent	Govindu. S	1,162	1.71	New
Independent	Venkateshappa	1,034	1.53	New
Independent	P. S. Narayana Gowda	929	1.37	New
LKD	Anwar Pasha	504	0.74	New
Margin of victory		22,104	32.62	▲12.78
Turnout		69,066	68.53	▼5.84
Total valid votes		67,758		
Rejected ballots		1,308	1.89	▼0.40
Registered electors		100,779		▲5.52
CPI(M) gain from Independent		Swing	▲17.13	

=== Assembly Election 1983 ===
1983 Karnataka Legislative Assembly election : Mulbagal
Party	Candidate	Votes	%	±%
Independent	Beere Gowda	31,862	45.91	New
INC	J. M. Reddy	18,091	26.07	▲8.07
Independent	R. Venkataramaiah	17,662	25.45	New
BJP	M. P. Raghunath	1,306	1.88	New
Independent	P. Muniyappa	482	0.69	New
Margin of victory		13,771	19.84	▲12.90
Turnout		71,028	74.37	▼2.61
Total valid votes		69,403		
Rejected ballots		1,625	2.29	▼0.47
Registered electors		95,508		▲11.98
Independent gain from INC(I)		Swing	▲10.98	

=== Assembly Election 1978 ===
1978 Karnataka Legislative Assembly election : Mulbagal
Party	Candidate	Votes	%	±%
INC(I)	J. M. Reddy	22,300	34.93	New
JP	Beere Gowda	17,871	27.99	New
INC	M. V. Venkatappa	11,489	18.00	▼4.23
Independent	R. Venkataramaian	11,475	17.97	New
Margin of victory		4,429	6.94	▼9.64
Turnout		65,652	76.98	▲26.81
Total valid votes		63,841		
Rejected ballots		1,811	2.76	▲2.76
Registered electors		85,287		▲14.74
INC(I) gain from Independent		Swing	▼12.25	

=== Assembly Election 1972 ===
1972 Mysore State Legislative Assembly election : Mulbagal
Party	Candidate	Votes	%	±%
Independent	P. Muniyappa	17,112	47.18	New
INC(O)	Buchappa	11,097	30.59	New
INC	V. Venkatamuni	8,062	22.23	▼30.98
Margin of victory		6,015	16.58	▲7.65
Turnout		37,290	50.17	▲8.17
Total valid votes		36,271		
Registered electors		74,328		▲12.58
Independent gain from INC		Swing	▼6.03	

=== Assembly Election 1967 ===
1967 Mysore State Legislative Assembly election : Mulbagal
Party	Candidate	Votes	%	±%
INC	T. Channaiah	13,917	53.21	▼11.48
Independent	P. Muniyappa	11,581	44.28	New
Independent	M. Venkatappa	657	2.51	New
Margin of victory		2,336	8.93	▼34.21
Turnout		27,727	42.00	▲6.55
Total valid votes		26,155		
Registered electors		66,023		▲12.53
INC hold		Swing	▼11.48	

=== Assembly Election 1962 ===
1962 Mysore State Legislative Assembly election : Mulbagal
Party	Candidate	Votes	%	±%
INC	J. Narayanapp. A	12,070	64.69	▲23.32
Independent	P. Muniyappa	4,021	21.55	New
Independent	Gurappa	1,750	9.38	New
Independent	Venkatappa	586	3.14	New
RPI	B. H. Hanumappa	232	1.24	New
Margin of victory		8,049	43.14	▲28.70
Turnout		20,801	35.45	▼7.83
Total valid votes		18,659		
Registered electors		58,672		▼44.99
INC gain from Independent		Swing	▲29.31	

=== Assembly Election 1957 ===
1957 Mysore State Legislative Assembly election : Mulbagal
Party	Candidate	Votes	%	±%
Independent	B. L. Narayana Swamy	32,662	35.38	New
INC	G. Narayana Gowda	19,327	20.93	▼31.40
INC	Narayanappa	18,870	20.44	▼31.89
Independent	G. Narayanaswamy	16,902	18.31	New
Independent	A. C. Venkataswamy	2,622	2.84	New
Independent	Gangappa	1,939	2.10	New
Margin of victory		13,335	14.44	▼3.89
Turnout		92,322	43.28	▼4.06
Total valid votes		92,322		
Registered electors		106,665		▲24.50
Independent gain from INC		Swing	▼16.95	

=== Assembly Election 1952 ===
1952 Mysore State Legislative Assembly election : Mulbagal
Party	Candidate	Votes	%	±%
INC	G. Narayana Gowda	21,225	52.33	New
Independent	B. L. Narayana Swamy	13,789	34.00	New
Independent	G. K. Venkataramaiah	5,545	13.67	New
INC	T. Channaiah			
Margin of victory		7,436	18.33	
Turnout		40,559	47.34	
Total valid votes		40,559		
Registered electors		85,676		
INC win (new seat)				

== See also ==
- Kolar district
- List of constituencies of Karnataka Legislative Assembly
