= Third Hegde ministry =

Government of Karnataka, India (1986–88)

- 16th Council of Ministers of Karnataka State
- Date formed: 16 February 1986
- Date dissolved: 10 August 1988

People and organisations
- Head of state: Ashoknath Banerji (16 April 1982 – 25 February 1987); Pendekanti Venkatasubbaiah (26 February 1987 – 5 February 1990)
- Head of government: Ramakrishna Hegde
- Member parties: JP
- Status in legislature: Majority
- Opposition party: Indian National Congress
- Opposition leader: S. Bangarappa; K. S. Nagarathanamma(assembly)

History
- Election: 1985
- Outgoing election: 1989 (After S. R. Bommai Ministry)
- Legislature terms: 6 years (Council); 5 years (Assembly)
- Predecessor: Second Hegde ministry
- Successor: S. R. Bommai ministry

Ramakrishna Hegde ministry was the Council of Ministers in Karnataka, a state in South India headed by Ramakrishna Hegde of the Janata Party.

The ministry had multiple ministers including the Chief Minister. All ministers belonged to the JP.

After Ramakrishna Hegde quit on 13 February 1986, he was again elected as Janata Legislative Party leader and took charge as Chief Minister of the State on 16 February 1986 and his was in power till he resigned on 10 August 1988. Later S. R. Bommai sworn in as Chief Minister on 13 August 1988. However S. R. Bommai government was dismissed by the then Governor, P. Venkatasubbaiah on 21 April 1989. The dismissal was on the grounds that his government had lost its majority following large-scale defections engineered by several Janata Party leaders of the day. Bommai had sought some time from the Governor to prove his majority on the floor of the Legislature and he was denied this. He challenged this order in the Supreme Court.

S. R. Bommai v. Union of India was a landmark judgment of the Supreme Court of India, where the Court discussed at length, the provisions of Article 356 of the Constitution of India and related issues. The apex court spelt out restrictions on the centre's power to dismiss a state government under Article 356. This case had huge impact on Centre-State Relations. Instances of imposition of President's rule have reduced after this judgement.

== Chief Minister and Cabinet Ministers ==
S.No	Portfolio	Minister	Constituency	Term of Office		Party
1.	Chief Minister: Cabinet Affairs; Personnel and Administrative Reforms; Finance (excluding National Savings Scheme); Ecology and Environment; Science and Technology; *Other departments not allocated to any Minister.	Ramakrishna Hegde	Basavanagudi	16 February 1986	10 August 1988	JP
2.	Home	B. Rachaiah	Santhemarahalli	29 June 1986	26 April 1987	JP
3.	Home; (Excluding Prisons, Excise, Home Guards and Civil Defence and matters pertaining to Cinematographic Act)	R. L. Jalappa	Doddaballapur	26 April 1987	7 May 1988	JP
4.	Revenue (Excluding Muzrai)	S. R. Bommai	Hubli Rural	16 February 1986	10 August 1988	JP
5.	Horticulture (Excluding Dry Land Development)	R. V. Deshpande	Haliyal	26 April 1987	10 August 1988	JP
6.	Agriculture	R. V. Deshpande	Haliyal	26 April 1987	2 May 1988	JP
6.	Agriculture	K. M. Muniyappa	Chikballapur	16 February 1986	2 May 1988	JP
6.	Agriculture	R. V. Deshpande	Haliyal	3 May 1988	10 August 1988	JP
7.	Primary and Secondary Education	C. Byre Gowda	Vemagal	16 February 1986	29 June 1986	JP
7.	Primary and Secondary Education	G. C. Manjunath	Holalkere	29 June 1986	2 May 1988	JP
7.	Primary and Secondary Education	Jeevaraj Alva	Jayamahal	3 May 1988	10 August 1988	JP
8.	Higher Education and Printing Stationery and Publications	Jeevaraj Alva	Jayamahal	26 April 1987	10 August 1988	JP
9.	Power; Commerce and Industries (excluding Mines and Geology)	J. H. Patel	Channagiri	29 June 1986	26 April 1987	JP
10.	Commerce and Industries (excluding Small Scale Industries, Mines and Geology and Dasara Exhibition)	J. H. Patel	Channagiri	26 April 1987	10 August 1988	JP
11.	Public Works.	H. D. Deve Gowda	Holenarsipur	16 February 1986	29 March 1988	JP
11.	Public Works.	M. Chandrashekar	Jayanagar	3 May 1988	10 August 1988	JP
12.	Transport	P. G. R. Sindhia	Kanakapura	26 April 1987	10 August 1988	JP
13.	Irrigation.	H. D. Deve Gowda	Holenarsipur	16 February 1986	29 March 1988	JP
14.	Planning and Institutional Finance and Statistics	S. R. Bommai	Hubli Rural	26 April 1987	10 August 1988	JP
15.	Mines and Geology; Forests	Jagadevarao Deshmukh	Muddebihal	29 June 1986	10 August 1988	JP
16.	Small scale Industries	B. A. Jivijaya	Somwarpet	26 April 1987	2 May 1988	JP
16.	Small scale Industries	M. Raghupathy	Malleshwaram	3 May 1988	10 August 1988	JP
17.	Sericulture	K. M. Krishna Reddy	Chintamani	29 June 1986	26 April 1987	JP
17.	Sericulture	K. M. Muniyappa	Chikballapur	26 April 1987	1987-88	JP
17.	Sericulture	Siddaramaiah	Chamundeshwari	1987-88	2 May 1988	JP
17.	Sericulture	A. Lakshmisagar	Chickpet	3 May 1988	10 August 1988	JP
18.	Food and Civil Supplies	A. Lakshmisagar	Chickpet	29 June 1986	10 August 1988	JP
19.	Law and Parliamentary Alfairs	A. Lakshmisagar	Chickpet	26 April 1987	10 August 1988	JP
20.	Fisheries	K. M. Krishna Reddy	Chintamani	29 June 1986	10 August 1988	JP
21.	Veterinary and Animal Husbandary	K. M. Krishna Reddy	Chintamani	29 June 1986	26 April 1987	JP
21.	Veterinary and Animal Husbandary	Siddaramaiah	Chamundeshwari	26 April 1987	2 May 1988	JP
21.	Veterinary and Animal Husbandary	Abdul Nazir Sab	MLC	3 May 1988	10 August 1988	JP
22.	Command Area Development, Electricity, Hydro-Electric Projects and Inland Water Transport	H. D. Deve Gowda	Holenarsipur	26 April 1987	29 March 1988	JP
23.	Inland Water Transport	M. Raghupathy	Malleshwaram	26 April 1987	10 August 1988	JP
24.	Ports	M. Raghupathy	Malleshwaram	26 April 1987	2 May 1988	JP
24.	Ports	M. Chandrashekar	Jayanagar	3 May 1988	10 August 1988	JP
26.	Health and family welfare	H. T. Krishnappa	Nagamangala	29 June 1986	26 April 1987	JP
26.	Health and family welfare	B. Rachaiah	Santhemarahalli	26 April 1987	10 August 1988	JP
27.	Excise	H. T. Krishnappa	Nagamangala	29 June 1986	26 April 1987	JP
27.	Excise	D. B. Inamdar	Kittur	26 April 1987	10 August 1988	JP
28.	Rural Development and Panchayati Raj, Wakf and Haj Committee	Abdul Nazir Sab	MLC	29 June 1986	10 August 1988	JP
29.	Social Welfare (excluding Labour)	G. Basavannappa	Holehonnur	29 June 1986	10 August 1988	JP
30.	Industrial Cooperatives	R. B. Potdar	MLC	26 April 1987	10 August 1988	JP
31.	Transport	P. G. R. Sindhia	Kanakapura	26 April 1987	10 August 1988	JP
32.	Labour	S. R. Bommai	Hubli Rural	29 June 1986	26 April 1987	JP
32.	Labour	S. K. Kanta	Gulbarga	26 April 1987	10 August 1988	JP
33.	Cooperation	R. L. Jalappa	Doddaballapur	29 June 1986	26 April 1987	JP
33.	Cooperation	H. Ekanthaiah	Chitradurga	26 April 1987	10 August 1988	JP
34.	Information, Tourism and Youth Services; Government Flying Training School; Bharat Scouts and Guides, Matters relating to Cinematographic Act; Dasara Exhibition; Bangalore Development Authority; Bangalore Metropolitan Regional Development Authority	M. P. Prakash	Hoovina Hadagali	26 April 1987	10 August 1988	JP
35.	Urban development	V. L. Patil	Kagwad	29 June 1986	14 August 1986	JP
36.	Housing and Urban Development; (Excluding Bangalore Development Authority, Bangalore Metropolitan Regional Development Authority)	M. Chandrashekar	Jayanagar	26 April 1987	10 August 1988	JP
38.	.	H. L. Thimme Gowda	Hunasuru	16 February 1986	29 June 1986	JP
39.	.	M. Raghupathy	Malleshwaram	16 February 1986	29 June 1986	JP
40.	Planning	D. Manjunath	Hiriyur	1984	29 December 1984	JP

== Minister of State ==
S.No	Portfolio	Minister	Constituency	Term of Office		Party
1.	.	B. A. Jivijaya	Somwarpet	16 February 1986	29 June 1986	JP
2.	.	M. P. Prakash	Hoovina Hadagali	16 February 1986	29 June 1986	JP
3.	.	P. G. R. Sindhia	Kanakapura	16 February 1986	29 June 1986	JP
4.	.	Jeevaraj Alva	Jayamahal	16 February 1986	29 June 1986	JP
5.	.	Ramesh Jigajinagi	Ballolli	16 February 1986	29 June 1986	JP
6.	Rural Development; Panchayati Raj; Housing	B. R. Yavagal	Nargund	16 February 1986	29 June 1986	JP
7.	.	Siddaramaiah	Chamundeshwari	16 February 1986	29 June 1986	JP
8.	.	D. B. Inamdar	Kittur	16 February 1986	29 June 1986	JP
9.	.	B. Somashekar	Malavalli	16 February 1986	29 June 1986	JP
10.	.	Y. K. Ramaiah	Kunigal	16 February 1986	29 June 1986	JP
11.	.	H. G. Govinde Gowda	Sringeri	16 February 1986	29 June 1986	JP
12.	.	R. V. Deshpande	Haliyal	16 February 1986	29 June 1986	JP
13.	.	Basavaraj Patil Attur	Basavakalyan	16 February 1986	29 June 1986	JP
14.	.	A. Pushpavathi	Devadurga	16 February 1986	29 June 1986	JP
15.	Fisheries, Ports and Wakf.	R. Roshan Baig	Shivajinagar	16 February 1986	10 August 1988	JP
16.	Horticulture	Y. K. Ramaiah	Kunigal	26 April 1987	30 April 1988	JP
16.	Horticulture	Lakshminarasimhaiah	Tumkur	3 May 1988	10 August 1988	JP
17.	Power	Lakshminarasimhaiah	Tumkur	26 April 1987	10 August 1988	JP
18.	Regulated Markets (Agricultural Marketing)	K. B. Mallappa	Arkalgud	16 February 1986	2 May 1988	JP
		K. Amarnath Shetty	Moodabidri	3 May 1988	10 August 1988	JP
19.	Women's and Children's Welfare	Shivkantha Chature	Hulsoor	26 April 1987	2 May 1988	JP
20.	Youth Service and Sports.	B. L. Shankar	MLC	26 April 1987	3 May 1988	JP
20.	Youth Service and Sports.	Ramesh Jigajinagi	Ballolli	3 May 1988	10 August 1988	JP
21.	Finance and Prisons	C. Veeranna	Koratagere	26 April 1987	10 August 1988	JP
22.	Small Savings	C. Veeranna	Koratagere	29 June 1986	10 August 1988	JP
23.	Transport	C. Veeranna	Koratagere	29 June 1986	10 August 1988	JP
24.	Food and Civil Supplies	Basavaraj Patil Anwari	Manvi	26 April 1987	10 August 1988	JP
25.	Mines and Geology	Ramesh Jigajinagi	Ballolli	26 April 1987	10 August 1988	JP
26.	Forests	G. S. Bagalkot	Jamkhandi	26 April 1987	10 August 1988	JP
27.	Religious and Charitable Endowments	K. Amarnath Shetty	Moodabidri	26 April 1987	10 August 1988	JP
28.	Dry Land Development	K. Amarnath Shetty	Moodabidri	3 May 1988	10 August 1988	JP
29.	Primary and Secondary Education	B. Somashekar	Malavalli	26 April 1987	9 July 1988	JP
30.	Minor and lift irrigation	K. Krishnamurthy	Kalmala	26 April 1987	10 August 1988	JP
31.	Housing	Mohammed Moinuddin	Chamrajpet	26 April 1987	10 August 1988	JP
32.	Horticulture	Basavaraj Patil Anwari	Manvi	29 June 1986	10 August 1988	JP

== See also ==
- Karnataka Legislative Assembly
