= S. R. Bommai ministry =

Government of Karnataka, India (1988–89)

- 17th Council of Ministers of Karnataka State
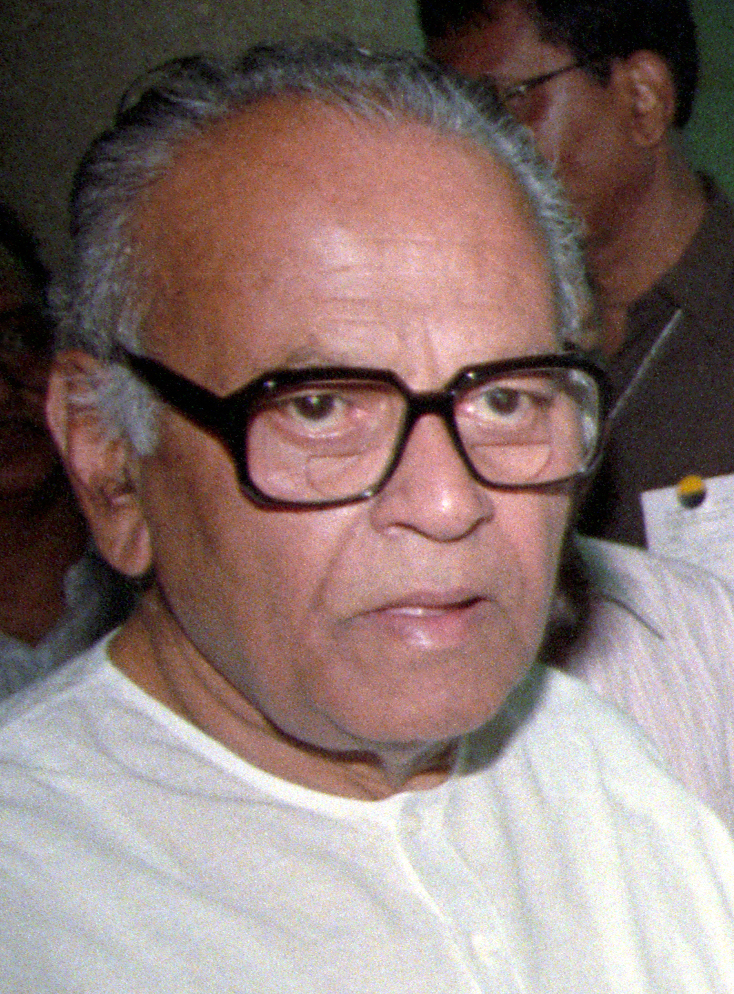
- S. R. Bommai; Chief Minister of Karnataka
- Date formed: 13 August 1988
- Date dissolved: 21 April 1989

People and organisations
- Head of state: Pendekanti Venkatasubbaiah (26 February 1987 – 5 February 1990)
- Head of government: S. R. Bommai
- No. of ministers: 34
- Member parties: JP
- Status in legislature: Majority
- Opposition party: Indian National Congress
- Opposition leader: K. S. Nagarathanamma (assembly)

History
- Election: 1985
- Outgoing election: 1989
- Legislature terms: 6 years (Council); 5 years (Assembly)
- Predecessor: Third Ramakrishna Hegde cabinet
- Successor: Second Veerendra Patil cabinet

S. R. Bommai ministry was the Council of Ministers in Karnataka, a state in South India headed by S. R. Bommai of the Janata Party.

The ministry had multiple ministers including the Chief Minister. All ministers belonged to the JP.

After Ramakrishna Hegde quit on moral grounds, Mr. Bommai took charge as Chief Minister of the State on 13 August 1988 and his government was dismissed by the then Governor, P. Venkatasubbaiah, on 21 April 1989. The dismissal was on the grounds that his government had lost its majority following large-scale defections engineered by several Janata Party leaders of the day. Bommai had sought some time from the Governor to prove his majority on the floor of the Legislature and he was denied this. He challenged this order in the Supreme Court.

S. R. Bommai v. Union of India was a landmark judgment of the Supreme Court of India, where the Court discussed at length, the provisions of Article 356 of the Constitution of India and related issues. The apex court spelt out restrictions on the centre's power to dismiss a state government under Article 356. This case had huge impact on Centre-State Relations. Instances of imposition of President's rule have reduced after this judgement.

== Chief Minister & Cabinet Ministers ==
S.No	Portfolio	Minister	Constituency	Term of Office		Party
1.	Chief Minister *Other departments not allocated to any Minister.	S. R. Bommai	Hubli Rural	13 August 1988	21 April 1989	JP
2.	Animal husbandry.	Krishna	Krishnarajpete	13 August 1988	21 April 1989	JP
3.	Sericulture.	Krishna	Krishnarajpete	13 August 1988	21 April 1989	JP
4.	.	J. H. Patel	Channagiri	13 August 1988	21 April 1989	JP
5.	Public Works.	H. D. Deve Gowda	Holenarsipur	13 August 1988	21 April 1989	JP
6.	Irrigation.	H. D. Deve Gowda	Holenarsipur	13 August 1988	21 April 1989	JP
7.	.	B. Rachaiah	Santhemarahalli	13 August 1988	21 April 1989	JP
8.	Rural development Panchayat Raj	Abdul Nazir Sab	MLC	13 August 1988	24 October 1988	JP
8.	Rural development Panchayat Raj	M. P. Prakash	Hoovina Hadagali	25 October 1988	21 April 1989	JP
9.	Health family welfare	Jagadevarao Deshmukh	Muddebihal	15 March 1989	21 April 1989	JP
10.	.	Lakshminarasimhaiah	Tumkur	1988	21 April 1989	JP
11.	.	Siddaramaiah	Chamundeshwari	13 August 1988	21 April 1989	JP
12.	.	M. Chandrashekar	Jayanagar	13 August 1988	21 April 1989	JP
13.	.	A. Lakshmisagar	Chickpet	13 August 1988	21 April 1989	JP
14.	Information; Tourism	M. P. Prakash	Hoovina Hadagali	13 August 1988	21 April 1989	JP
15.	.	P. G. R. Sindhia	Kanakapura	13 August 1988	21 April 1989	JP
16.	.	R. V. Deshpande	Haliyal	13 August 1988	21 April 1989	JP
17.	.	Ramesh Jigajinagi	Ballolli	13 August 1988	21 April 1989	JP
18.	.	Vishwanath Reddy Mudnal	Yadgir	13 March 1989	21 April 1989	JP
19.	.	H. G. Govinde Gowda	Sringeri	13 March 1989	21 April 1989	JP
20.	.	K. M. Krishna Reddy	Chintamani	13 March 1989	21 April 1989	JP
21.	.	C. Veeranna	Koratagere	13 March 1989	21 April 1989	JP
22.	.	M. Raghupathy	Malleshwaram	15 April 1989	21 April 1989	JP
23.	.	H. Ekanthaiah	Chitradurga	15 April 1989	21 April 1989	JP
24.	.	K. B. Mallappa	Arkalgud	15 April 1989	21 April 1989	JP
25.	.	B. Basavaiah	Kollegal	15 April 1989	21 April 1989	JP

== Minister of State ==
S.No	Portfolio	Minister	Constituency	Term of Office		Party
1	.	R. Roshan Baig	Shivajinagar	13 March 1989	21 April 1989	JP
2	.	A. Pushpavathi	Devadurga	13 March 1989	21 April 1989	JP
3	.	Leeladevi R. Prasad	Athani	13 March 1989	21 April 1989	JP
4	.	B. B. Ningaiah	Mudigere	13 March 1989	21 April 1989	JP
5	.	M.C. Nanaiah	MLC	15 April 1989	21 April 1989	JP
6	.	B. R. Yavagal	Nargund	15 April 1989	21 April 1989	JP
7	.	H. G. Channappa	Magadi	15 April 1989	21 April 1989	JP
8	.	B. D. Basavaraju	Sakleshpur	15 April 1989	21 April 1989	JP
9	.	Virupakshappa Agadi	Koppal	15 April 1989	21 April 1989	JP
10	.	Gurupadappa Nagamarapalli	Aurad	15 April 1989	21 April 1989	JP
11	.	R. M. Patil	Arabhavi	15 April 1989	21 April 1989	JP
12	.	K. Amarnath Shetty	Moodabidri	15 April 1989	21 April 1989	JP
13	.	K. S. Beelagi	Byadgi	15 April 1989	21 April 1989	JP

== See also ==
- Karnataka Legislative Assembly
- 2019 Karnataka resignation crisis
