= Second Hegde ministry =

Government of Karnataka, India (1985–86)

- 15th Council of Ministers of Karnataka State
- Date formed: 8 March 1985
- Date dissolved: 13 February 1986

People and organisations
- Head of state: Ashoknath Banerji (16 April 1982 – 25 February 1987)
- Head of government: Ramakrishna Hegde
- No. of ministers: 30
- Member parties: JP
- Status in legislature: Majority
- Opposition party: Indian National Congress
- Opposition leader: S. Bangarappa(assembly)

History
- Election: 1985
- Outgoing election: 1989 (After S. R. Bommai Ministry)
- Legislature terms: 6 years (Council); 5 years (Assembly)
- Predecessor: First Hegde ministry
- Successor: Third Hegde ministry

Ramakrishna Hegde ministry was the Council of Ministers in Karnataka, a state in South India headed by Ramakrishna Hegde of the Janata Party.

The ministry had multiple ministers including the Chief Minister. All ministers belonged to the Janata Party.

After Ramakrishna Hegde, during his previous term, resigned the chief minister post and dissolved the Legislative Assembly on 29 December 1984, the Janata Party won the elections again and he was elected leader. He took charge as Chief Minister of the State on 8 March 1985. He was in power till he resigned on 13 February 1986.

Later he was sworn in as Chief Minister on 16 February 1986.

== Chief Minister & Cabinet Ministers ==
S.No	Portfolio	Minister	Constituency	Term of Office		Party
1.	Chief Minister *Other departments not allocated to any Minister.	Ramakrishna Hegde	Basavanagudi	8 March 1985	13 February 1986	JP
2.	Agriculture	B. Rachaiah	Santhemarahalli	8 March 1985	13 February 1986	JP
3.	Home	M. Raghupathy	Malleshwaram	8 March 1985	13 February 1986	JP
4.	Power; Excise	J. H. Patel	Channagiri	8 March 1985	13 February 1986	JP
5.	Public Works.	H. D. Deve Gowda	Holenarsipur	8 March 1985	13 February 1986	JP
6.	Irrigation.	H. D. Deve Gowda	Holenarsipur	8 March 1985	13 February 1986	JP
7.	Revenue	S. R. Bommai	Hubli Rural	8 March 1985	13 February 1986	JP
8.	Law	A. Lakshmisagar	Chickpet	8 March 1985	13 February 1986	JP
9.	.	Jagadevarao Deshmukh	Muddebihal	8 March 1985	13 February 1986	JP
10.	.	K. B. Mallappa	Arkalgud	8 March 1985	13 February 1986	JP
11.	Rural Development and Wakf	Abdul Nazir Sab	MLC	8 March 1985	13 February 1986	JP
12.	Labour; Education; Planning	D. Manjunath	Hiriyur	8 March 1985	13 February 1986	JP
13.	.	C. Veeranna	Koratagere	8 March 1985	13 February 1986	JP

== Minister of State ==
S.No	Portfolio	Minister	Constituency	Term of Office		Party
1	Fisheries, Ports and Wakf.	R. Roshan Baig	Shivajinagar	8 March 1985	13 February 1986	JP
2	Animal Husbandary	Siddaramaiah	Chamundeshwari	8 March 1985	13 February 1986	JP
3	Health	D. B. Inamdar	Kittur	8 March 1985	13 February 1986	JP

== Leader of the House ==
Legislative Assembly - Ramakrishna Hegde (Chief minister) Legislative Council - Abdul Nazir Sab (Minister of Rural development and Wakf)

== See also ==
- Karnataka Legislative Assembly
