= First Hegde ministry =

Government of Karnataka, India (1983–84)

- 14th Council of Ministers of Karnataka State
- Date formed: 10 January 1983
- Date dissolved: 29 December 1984

People and organisations
- Head of state: Ashoknath Banerji (16 April 1982 – 25 February 1987)
- Head of government: Ramakrishna Hegde
- Member parties: JP
- Status in legislature: Majority
- Opposition party: Indian National Congress
- Opposition leader: M. Veerappa Moily(assembly)

History
- Election: 1983
- Outgoing election: 1985
- Legislature terms: 6 years (Council); 5 years (Assembly)
- Predecessor: R. Gundu Rao ministry
- Successor: Second Hegde ministry

Ramakrishna Hegde ministry was the Council of Ministers in Karnataka, a state in South India headed by Ramakrishna Hegde of the Janata Party.

The ministry had multiple ministers including the Chief Minister. All ministers belonged to the JP.

After Janata Party won the 1983 Karnataka elections and Ramakrishna Hegde was elected as Janata Legislative Party leader. He took charge as Chief Minister of the State on 10 January 1983 and his was in power till he resigned on 29 December 1984. Later he was sworn in as Chief Minister on 8 March 1985 after winning 1985 Karnataka elections

== Chief Minister and Cabinet Ministers ==
| S.No | Portfolio | Minister | Constituency | Term of Office | | Party |
|---|---|---|---|---|---|---|
| 1. | Chief Minister *Other departments not allocated to any Minister. | Ramakrishna Hegde | Basavanagudi | 11 January 1983 | 29 December 1984 | JP |
| 2. | | B. Rachaiah | Santhemarahalli | 11 January 1983 | 29 December 1984 | JP |
| 3. | | M. Raghupathy | Malleshwaram | 11 January 1983 | 29 December 1984 | JP |
| 4. | Power; Commerce and Industries | J. H. Patel | Channagiri | 11 January 1983 | 29 December 1984 | JP |
| 5. | Public Works. | H. D. Deve Gowda | Holenarsipur | 11 January 1983 | 29 December 1984 | JP |
| 6. | Irrigation. | H. D. Deve Gowda | Holenarsipur | 11 January 1983 | 29 December 1984 | JP |
| 7. | Industries | S. R. Bommai | Hubli Rural | 11 January 1983 | 29 December 1984 | JP |
| 8. | | A. Lakshmisagar | Chickpet | 11 January 1983 | 29 December 1984 | JP |
| 9. | . | Jagadevarao Deshmukh | Muddebihal | 11 January 1983 | 29 December 1984 | JP |
| 10. | Wakf | Abdul Nazir Sab | MLC | 18 August 1984 | 29 December 1984 | JP |
| 11. | Rural Development; Panchayat Raj | Abdul Nazir Sab | MLC | 11 January 1983 | 29 December 1984 | JP |
| 12. | Industries; Transportation; Revenue | V. L. Patil | Kagwad | 11 January 1983 | 29 December 1984 | JP |
| 13. | Labour | V. L. Patil | Kagwad | 11 January 1983 | 1984 | JP |
| 14. | . | K. B. Mallappa | Arkalgud | 11 January 1983 | 29 December 1984 | JP |
| 15. | Urban development | M. Chandrashekar | Jayanagar | 11 January 1983 | 29 December 1984 | JP |
| 16. | Horticulture | Vaijnath Patil | Chincholi | 1984 | 1984 | JP |
| 17. | Labour; Education; Planning | D. Manjunath | Hiriyur | 1984 | 29 December 1984 | JP |

== Minister of State ==
| S.No | Portfolio | Minister | Constituency | Term of Office | | Party |
|---|---|---|---|---|---|---|
| 1. | Mines and Geology | D. B. Inamdar | Kittur | 11 January 1983 | 29 December 1984 | JP |

== Leader of the House ==
Legislative Assembly - Ramakrishna Hegde (Chief minister) Legislative Council - Abdul Nazir Sab (Minister of Rural development, Panchayat Raj and Wakf)

== See also ==
- Karnataka Legislative Assembly
