= Bommai ministry =

Bommai ministry may refer to:

== Karnataka Council of Ministers ==
- S. R. Bommai ministry, the government of Karnataka headed by S. R. Bommai from 1988 to 1989
- Basavaraj Bommai ministry, the government of Karnataka headed by Basavaraj Bommai from 2021 to 2023

== See also ==
- Bommai (disambiguation)
- S. R. Bommai
- Basavaraj Bommai
