= C. C. Patil =

Indian politician

Chandrakanthagouda Channappagouda Patil

Minister of Public Works Department Government of Karnataka
- In office 4 August 2021 – 13 May 2023
- Chief Minister: Basavaraj Bommai
- Preceded by: Govind Karjol

Minister of Small Scale Industries Government of Karnataka
- In office 21 January 2021 – 28 July 2021
- Chief Minister: B. S. Yediyurappa
- Preceded by: H. Nagesh
- Succeeded by: M. T. B. Nagaraj

Minister of Information & Public Relations Government of Karnataka
- In office 21 January 2021 – 28 July 2021
- Chief Minister: B. S. Yediyurappa
- Preceded by: D. K. Shivakumar

Minister of Environment & Forest Government of Karnataka
- In office 27 September 2019 – 10 February 2020
- Chief Minister: B. S. Yediyurappa
- Preceded by: Satish Jarkiholi
- Succeeded by: Anand Singh

Minister of Mines & Geology Government of Karnataka
- In office 20 August 2019 – 21 January 2021
- Chief Minister: B. S. Yediyurappa
- Preceded by: Rajashekar Patil
- Succeeded by: Murugesh Nirani

Minister of Women & Child Development Government of Karnataka
- In office 22 September 2010 – 9 February 2012
- Chief Minister: B. S. Yediyurappa; Sadananda Gowda
- Preceded by: P. M. Narendra Swamy
- Succeeded by: Kalakappa G Bandi

Member of Karnataka Legislative Assembly
- Incumbent
- Assumed office 2018
- Preceded by: B. R. Yavagal
- Constituency: Nargund
- In office 2004–2013
- Preceded by: B. R. Yavagal
- Succeeded by: B. R. Yavagal
- Constituency: Nargund

Personal details
- Born: 22 October 1958 (age 67) Gadag district
- Party: Bharatiya Janata Party

Chandrakanthgowda Channappagowda Patil is an Indian politician who served as the Minister of Public Works Department of Karnataka from 4 August 2021 to 13 May 2023. He is a member of the Karnataka Legislative Assembly from Nargund, Karnataka. He is a member of the Bharatiya Janata Party, who had served as Minister for Women and Child Welfare department, Government of Karnataka in the Sadananda Gowda Ministry. He was a member of the legislative assembly from Nargund from 2004 to 2013 and again was re-elected during 2018 assembly elections. He served as Minister for Mines and Geology from Commerce & Industries department and Ecology & Environment department in the B. S. Yediyurappa cabinet.

He resigned as a Minister on 8 February 2012 during the Karnataka video clip controversy.
