= Bommai =

Bommai may refer to:

- Bommai (1964 film), an Indian Tamil-language film
- Basavaraj Bommai (born 1960), 17th Chief Minister of Karnataka
- S. R. Bommai (1924-2007), 4th Chief Minister of Karnataka
- Bommai (2023 film), an Indian Tamil-language film

== See also ==
- Bommai ministry (disambiguation)
