= Krishna (politician) =

Indian politician (1941–2021)

11th Speaker of the Karnataka Legislative Assembly
- In office 10 June 2004 – 4 June 2008
- Preceded by: M. V. Venkatappa, INC
- Succeeded by: Jagadish Shettar, BJP

Minister of Sericulture and Animal Husbandry, Government of Karnataka
- In office 1988–89

Member of Parliament, Lok Sabha
- In office 1996–1998
- Preceded by: G. Madegowda
- Succeeded by: M. H. Ambareesh
- Constituency: Mandya

Member of Legislative Assembly
- In office 2004–2008
- Preceded by: K. B. Chandrashekar
- Succeeded by: K. B. Chandrashekar
- Constituency: Krishnarajpete
- In office 1994–1996
- Preceded by: M. Puttaswamy Gowda
- Succeeded by: B. Prakash
- Constituency: Krishnarajpete
- In office 1985–1989
- Preceded by: M. Puttaswamy Gowda
- Succeeded by: M. Puttaswamy Gowda
- Constituency: Krishnarajpete

Personal details
- Born: 1 July 1941 Kothamaranahally, Kingdom of Mysore, British India
- Died: 21 May 2021 (aged 79) Mysore, Karnataka, India
- Party: Independent (2013–2021)
- Other political affiliations: Janata Dal (Secular) (1999–2013); Janata Party (till 1988); Janata Dal (1988–1999)
- Spouse: Indramma (8 May 1969 – 21 May 2021, his death)
- Children: One daughter
- Education: Bachelor of Arts, Bachelor of Law
- Alma mater: Mysore University; Bangalore University
- Occupation: Politician
- Profession: Agriculturist, Lawyer, Political and Social Worker: Kothamaranahally, Krishnarajpet Taluk, Mandya district; Mysore

Krishna (1 July 1941 – 21 May 2021) was an Indian politician, former speaker of Karnataka Legislative Assembly and member of the Janata Dal (Secular) from the state of Karnataka. He was born in Kothamaranahally village (Krishnarajpet Taluk, Mandya district). He died on 21 May 2021 in Mysore, Karnataka.

== Political life ==
Rising in politics, he became Member of K. R. Pet Taluk Board from 1978 to 1983, later becoming General Secretary of Janata Party for Mandya district in 1980 till 1985. He was elected to Karnataka Legislative Assembly in 1985 and became the Minister of Sericulture and Animal Husbandry in 1988 to remain in the post till 1989. He was re-elected in 1994 from Krishnarajpete on Janata Dal ticket and resigned from the post after becoming the Member of Parliament from Mandya constituency. He was picked as the Speaker of the Karnataka Legislative Assembly after he became victorious as a Janata Dal (Secular) candidate in 2004 elections.

== Death ==
Krishna was suffering from cancer and was being treated in Chennai. He died at his residence in Kuvempunagar in Mysuru. Then Chief Minister of Karnataka B. S. Yediyurappa, his former H. D. Kumaraswamy and many others condoled the death of Krishna.

== Positions held ==
- 1978–83: Member, Taluk Board, K.R. Pet Taluk, Mandya district
- 1980–85: General Secretary, Janata Party, Mandya district
- 1985–89: Member, Karnataka Legislative Assembly
- 1985–87: Member, House Committee, Karnataka Legislature
- 1988–89: Cabinet Minister, Department of Sericulture and Animal Husbandry in S. R. Bommai government
- 1989–94: General-Secretary, Janata Dal, Karnataka
- 1994–96: Member, Karnataka Legislative Assembly
- 1995–96: Member, House Committee on Industries, Karnataka Legislative Assembly
- 1996–98: Elected to Lok Sabha (Eleventh) from Mandya
- 2004–08: Member, Karnataka Legislative Assembly from Krishnarajapete
- 2004–08: Speaker of the Karnataka Legislative Assembly
