= Umanatha Kotian =

Indian politician

Member of 15th Karnataka Legislative Assembly
- Incumbent
- Assumed office 2018
- Chief Minister: B. S. Yeddyurappa
- Preceded by: Abhayachandra Jain
- Constituency: Moodabidri

Personal details
- Born: 15 June 1951 (age 75)
- Party: Bharatiya Janata Party

Umanatha Kotian is a Bharatiya Janata Party political activist and member of the Karnataka Legislative Assembly from the Moodabidri constituency.

He was re-elected from Moodabidri Constituency in the May 2023 state election.

== Filmography ==
| Year | Title | Notes |
|---|---|---|
| 2014 | Chaali Polilu | |
