= Abdul Nazir Sab State Institute of Rural Development and Panchayat Raj =

Government college

Coordinates: 12.3066°N 76.6782°E

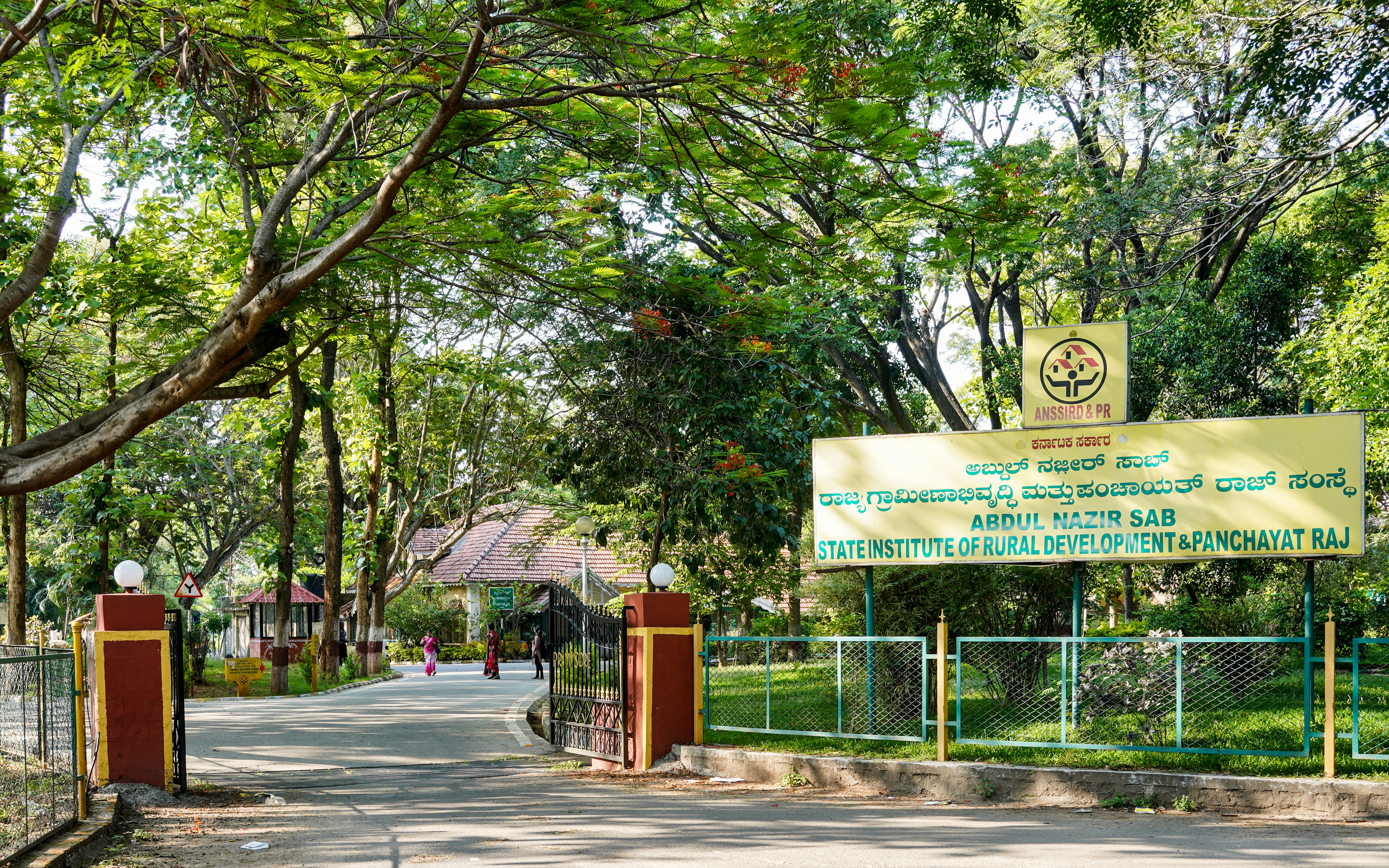
- Entrance, Abdul Nazir Sab State Institute of Rural Development & Panchayat Raj (ANSSIRD&PR), Mysore, Karnataka
- Former name: Abdul Nazir Sab State Institute for Rural Development
- Type: Government institution
- Established: 1989
- Affiliations: Department of Rural Development and Panchayat Raj, Government of Karnataka
- Director: Dr. Arundhati Chandrashekar (2024–present)
- Location: Mysore, Karnataka, India

The Abdul Nazir Sab State Institute of Rural Development and Panchayat Raj is a government institution located in Mysore, Karnataka. It was named after Abdul Nazir Sab, a former Karnataka Minister for Rural Development and Panchayat Raj, who was a strong advocate for the Panchayati Raj system and the decentralization of political power. The institute operates under the Department of Rural Development and Panchayat Raj (Karnataka) and provides training and capacity-building programs for elected representatives of Panchayat Raj institutions and officials from various development departments.

== History ==
The institution was originally established in 1989 as the Abdul Nazir Sab State Institute for Rural Development. In 2015, it was officially renamed to Abdul Nazir Sab State Institute of Rural Development and Panchayat Raj through a government order and was registered under the Karnataka Society Registration Act of 1960.

== Governance ==
ANSSIRDPR operates as an autonomous entity under the Department of Rural Development and Panchayat Raj. Its governing body is led by the Honourable Minister for Rural Development and Panchayat Raj, Government of Karnataka, and includes representatives from various sectors such as the Ministry of Rural Development, the National Institute of Rural Development and Panchayat Raj (NIRDPR), and members of Zila and Taluk Panchayats. The council also includes experts in rural development and governance for guidance. The day-to-day operations of the institute are managed by the executive committee, which is chaired by the Principal Secretary of the Rural Development and Panchayat Raj Department. This committee consists of representatives from key government departments and local government members.

K. Lakshmi Priya, an IAS officer, previously served as the director of ANSSIRDPR. On August 3, 2024, Dr. Arundhati Chandrashekar succeeded her as Director.

== Training programs ==
ANSSIRD employs methods including satellite-assisted learning to train gram panchayat members in Karnataka. In November 2023, the institute conducted a training program for about 49,000 women gram panchayat members to support their leadership skills. The program was held at various centers across Karnataka.

The Ministry of Panchayat Raj, in partnership with the National Institute of Rural Development and Panchayat Raj (NIRDPR) and ANSSIRDPR, held a National Consultative Workshop on Citizen Charter and Delivery of Services by Panchayats on November 22, as part of the Azadi Ka Amrit Mahotsav celebrations.
