= H. T. Manju =

Indian politician (born 1974)

H. T. Manjunath (born 1974) is an Indian politician from Karnataka. He is a member of the Karnataka Legislative Assembly from Krishnarajpete Assembly constituency in Mandya district. He represents Janata Dal (Secular) Party and won the 2023 Karnataka Legislative Assembly election.

== Early life and education ==
Manju is from Krishnarajpeta, Mandya district. His father Timmegowda is a farmer. He runs his own business including a petrol bunk. He did his bachelor's degree in library science through Karnataka Open University, Mysore.

== Career ==
Manju won the Krishnarajpete Assembly constituency representing Janata Dal (S) in the 2023 Karnataka Legislative Assembly election. He polled 80,646 votes and defeated his nearest rival, B. I. Devaraja of Indian National Congress, by a huge margin of 22,344 votes.
