= Vadnal Rajanna =

Indian Political Figure

Member of the Karnataka Legislative Assembly
- In office 2013–2018
- Preceded by: K Madal Virupakshappa
- Succeeded by: K Madal Virupakshappa
- Constituency: Channagiri
- In office 1999–2004
- Preceded by: J. H. Patel
- Succeeded by: Mahima J Patel
- Constituency: Channagiri

Personal details
- Party: Indian National Congress
- Occupation: Politician

Vadnal Rajanna was an Indian Politician from the state of Karnataka. He was a two term member of the Karnataka Legislative Assembly. He was a member of the Indian National Congress.

== Constituency ==
He represented the Channagiri constituency.

== Political party ==
First he was from Bharatiya Janata Party and later joined the Indian National Congress.

Karnataka Legislative Assembly
| Preceded by J. H. Patel | Member of Legislative Assembly for Channagiri; 1999–2004 | Succeeded by Mahima J Patel |
| Preceded by K Madal Virupakshappa | Member of Legislative Assembly for Channagiri; 2008–2013 | Succeeded by K Madal Virupakshappa |
