= Moodabidri Assembly constituency =

Legislative Assembly constituency in Karnataka State, India

Coordinates: 13.07°N 75°E

Moodabidri
- Constituency No. 201 for the Karnataka Legislative Assembly

Constituency details
- Country: India
- Region: South India
- State: Karnataka
- District: Dakshina Kannada
- Lok Sabha constituency: Dakshina Kannada
- Established: 1951
- Total electors: 205,099 (2023)
- Reservation: None

Member of Legislative Assembly
- 16th Karnataka Legislative Assembly
- Incumbent Umanatha A. Kotian
- Party: Bharatiya Janata Party
- Elected year: 2023
- Preceded by: Abhayachandra Jain

Moodabidri Assembly constituency is one of the 224 Legislative Assembly constituencies of Karnataka in India.

It is part of Dakshina Kannada district.

== Members of the Legislative Assembly ==
Election	Member	Party
1952	N. N. Suvarna	Indian National Congress
1962	Gopal Salenna	Swatantra Party
1967	K. R. Shetty	Swatantra Party
1972	Damodar Mulky	Indian National Congress
1978	Damodar Mulky	Indian National Congress
1983	K. Amarnath Shetty	Janata Party
1985	K. Amarnath Shetty	Janata Party
1989	K. Somappa Suvarna	Indian National Congress
1994	K. Amarnath Shetty	Janata Dal
1999	Abhayachandra Jain	Indian National Congress
2004	Abhayachandra Jain	Indian National Congress
2008	Abhayachandra Jain	Indian National Congress
2013	Abhayachandra Jain	Indian National Congress
2018	Umanatha Kotian	Bharatiya Janata Party
2023	Umanatha Kotian	Bharatiya Janata Party

== Election results ==
=== Assembly Election 2023 ===
2023 Karnataka Legislative Assembly election : Moodabidri
Party	Candidate	Votes	%	±%
BJP	Umanatha Kotian	86,925	54.77%	▼2.67
INC	Mithun M. Rai	64,457	40.61%	▲2.75
SDPI	Alphonse Franko	3,617	2.28%	New
JD(S)	Dr. Amarashree Amarnath Shetty	1,533	0.97%	▼0.24
NOTA	None of the above	837	0.53%	▼0.15
Margin of victory		22,468	14.16%	▼5.41
Turnout		159,142	77.59%	▲1.40
Total valid votes		158,721		
Registered electors		205,099		▲2.52
BJP hold		Swing	▼2.67	

=== Assembly Election 2018 ===
2018 Karnataka Legislative Assembly election : Moodabidri
Party	Candidate	Votes	%	±%
BJP	Umanatha Kotian	87,444	57.44%	▲24.10
INC	K. Abhayachandra	57,645	37.86%	▲1.40
Independent	Ashwin Jossy Pereira	2,111	1.39%	New
JD(S)	Jeevan Krishna Shetty	1,845	1.21%	▼12.83
CPI(M)	K. Yadava Shetty	1,114	0.73%	New
NOTA	None of the above	1,037	0.68%	New
Margin of victory		29,799	19.57%	▲16.45
Turnout		152,431	76.19%	▲1.95
Total valid votes		152,247		
Registered electors		200,066		▲15.28
BJP gain from INC		Swing	▲20.98	

=== Assembly Election 2013 ===
2013 Karnataka Legislative Assembly election : Moodabidri
Party	Candidate	Votes	%	±%
INC	Abhayachandra Jain	53,180	36.46%	▼3.85
BJP	Umanatha Kotian	48,630	33.34%	▲1.95
JD(S)	K. Amarnath Shetty	20,471	14.04%	▼9.46
SDPI	Ismail. B	3,523	2.42%	New
Independent	Abhaya Kumar Jain	1,650	1.13%	New
KJP	Michel Lobo	1,354	0.93%	New
Margin of victory		4,550	3.12%	▼5.80
Turnout		128,853	74.24%	▲1.70
Total valid votes		145,853		
Registered electors		173,553		▲13.42
INC hold		Swing	▼3.85	

=== Assembly Election 2008 ===
2008 Karnataka Legislative Assembly election : Moodabidri
Party	Candidate	Votes	%	±%
INC	Abhayachandra Jain	44,744	40.31%	▲3.99
BJP	K. P. Jagadish Adhikari	34,841	31.39%	▲2.52
JD(S)	K. Amarnath Shetty	26,083	23.50%	▼9.24
BSP	Mohammed Farooq	2,297	2.07%	New
Independent	Steven Vincent D'souza	1,984	1.79%	New
SP	D. R. Raju Poojary	1,054	0.95%	New
Margin of victory		9,903	8.92%	▲5.34
Turnout		111,004	72.54%	▲3.02
Total valid votes		111,003		
Registered electors		153,024		▲29.09
INC hold		Swing	▲3.99	

=== Assembly Election 2004 ===
2004 Karnataka Legislative Assembly election : Moodabidri
Party	Candidate	Votes	%	±%
INC	Abhayachandra Jain	29,926	36.32%	▼14.52
JD(S)	K. Amarnath Shetty	26,977	32.74%	▲31.78
BJP	Kotian Ms	23,788	28.87%	New
Kannada Nadu Party	Robert Rosario	1,712	2.08%	New
Margin of victory		2,949	3.58%	▼2.41
Turnout		82,403	69.52%	▼0.27
Total valid votes		82,403		
Registered electors		118,538		▲12.49
INC hold		Swing	▼14.52	

=== Assembly Election 1999 ===
1999 Karnataka Legislative Assembly election : Moodabidri
Party	Candidate	Votes	%	±%
INC	Abhayachandra Jain	35,588	50.84%	▲22.88
JD(U)	K. Amarnath Shetty	31,398	44.86%	New
BSP	B. G. Pereira	1,421	2.03%	New
JD(S)	Daniel D. Souza	674	0.96%	New
Kannada Chalavali Vatal Paksha	S. Sathish Salian	521	0.74%	New
Margin of victory		4,190	5.99%	▼13.53
Turnout		73,538	69.79%	▼0.77
Total valid votes		69,998		
Rejected ballots		3,540	4.81%	▲3.60
Registered electors		105,372		▲4.68
INC gain from JD		Swing	▲3.35	

=== Assembly Election 1994 ===
1994 Karnataka Legislative Assembly election : Moodabidri
Party	Candidate	Votes	%	±%
JD	K. Amarnath Shetty	33,319	47.49%	▲3.75
INC	K. Somappa Suvarna	19,620	27.96%	▼23.94
BJP	M. S. Kotian	9,331	13.30%	▲10.81
INC	Dr. Damodhar Mulky	7,360	10.49%	New
Margin of victory		13,699	19.52%	▲11.36
Turnout		71,028	70.56%	▼1.32
Total valid votes		70,163		
Rejected ballots		857	1.21%	▼2.84
Registered electors		100,664		▲3.93
JD gain from INC		Swing	▼4.41	

=== Assembly Election 1989 ===
1989 Karnataka Legislative Assembly election : Moodabidri
Party	Candidate	Votes	%	±%
INC	K. Somappa Suvarna	34,667	51.90%	▲4.03
JD	K. Amarnath Shetty	29,219	43.74%	New
BJP	K. Keshava Rai	1,664	2.49%	New
JP	Robert D. Souza	1,125	1.68%	New
Margin of victory		5,448	8.16%	▲5.32
Turnout		69,621	71.88%	▼3.28
Total valid votes		66,799		
Rejected ballots		2,822	4.05%	▲3.21
Registered electors		96,857		▲27.62
INC gain from JP		Swing	▲1.19	

=== Assembly Election 1985 ===
1985 Karnataka Legislative Assembly election : Moodabidri
Party	Candidate	Votes	%	±%
JP	K. Amarnath Shetty	28,683	50.71%	▼4.68
INC	K. Somappa Suvarna	27,075	47.87%	▲3.26
Independent	K. Shivaraya Shenoy	525	0.93%	New
Margin of victory		1,608	2.84%	▼7.94
Turnout		57,041	75.16%	▲6.26
Total valid votes		56,562		
Rejected ballots		479	0.84%	▼0.99
Registered electors		75,897		▲16.38
JP hold		Swing	▼4.68	

=== Assembly Election 1983 ===
1983 Karnataka Legislative Assembly election : Moodabidri
Party	Candidate	Votes	%	±%
JP	Amarnatha Sheety. K	24,433	55.39%	▲12.37
INC	Devdas Kattemar	19,676	44.61%	▲40.18
Margin of victory		4,757	10.78%	▲1.25
Turnout		44,932	68.90%	▼7.98
Total valid votes		44,109		
Rejected ballots		823	1.83%	▲0.30
Registered electors		65,213		▲0.55
JP gain from INC(I)		Swing	▲2.84	

=== Assembly Election 1978 ===
1978 Karnataka Legislative Assembly election : Moodabidri
Party	Candidate	Votes	%	±%
INC(I)	Damodar Mulky	25,800	52.55%	New
JP	K. Amarnath Shetty	21,121	43.02%	New
INC	S. D. Samrajya	2,175	4.43%	▼60.51
Margin of victory		4,679	9.53%	▼22.51
Turnout		49,860	76.88%	▲5.69
Total valid votes		49,096		
Rejected ballots		764	1.53%	▲1.53
Registered electors		64,856		▲17.08
INC(I) gain from INC		Swing	▼12.39	

=== Assembly Election 1972 ===
1972 Mysore State Legislative Assembly election : Moodabidri
Party	Candidate	Votes	%	±%
INC	Damodar Moolki	25,121	64.94%	▲27.17
INC(O)	K. Amarnath Shetty	12,727	32.90%	New
Independent	Perody Vittal Shetty	836	2.16%	New
Margin of victory		12,394	32.04%	▲26.39
Turnout		39,433	71.19%	▲2.14
Total valid votes		38,684		
Registered electors		55,393		▲13.02
INC gain from SWA		Swing	▲21.52	

=== Assembly Election 1967 ===
1967 Mysore State Legislative Assembly election : Moodabidri
Party	Candidate	Votes	%	±%
SWA	K. R. Shetty	13,940	43.42%	▼7.21
INC	B. G. Das	12,126	37.77%	▼11.60
PSP	S. Aikal	6,037	18.81%	New
Margin of victory		1,814	5.65%	▲4.40
Turnout		33,845	69.05%	▲24.51
Total valid votes		32,103		
Registered electors		49,012		▲0.50
SWA hold		Swing	▼7.21	

=== Assembly Election 1962 ===
1962 Mysore State Legislative Assembly election : Moodabidri
Party	Candidate	Votes	%	±%
SWA	Gopal Salenna	10,431	50.63%	New
INC	Manjappa Ullal	10,173	49.37%	▼13.10
Margin of victory		258	1.25%	▼40.95
Turnout		21,720	44.54%	▼17.00
Total valid votes		20,604		
Registered electors		48,770		▼28.93
SWA gain from INC		Swing	▼11.84	

=== Assembly Election 1952 ===
1952 Madras State Legislative Assembly election : Mulky
Party	Candidate	Votes	%	±%
INC	N. N. Suvarna	26,381	62.47%	New
Socialist	Sanjeevanath	8,562	20.28%	New
ABJS	Karkal Sadasiva Rao	5,267	12.47%	New
Independent	B. D. Souza	2,019	4.78%	New
Margin of victory		17,819	42.20%	
Turnout		42,229	61.54%	
Total valid votes		42,229		
Registered electors		68,621		
INC win (new seat)				

== See also ==
- List of constituencies of the Karnataka Legislative Assembly
- Dakshina Kannada district
