= B. R. Yavagal =

Indian politician

B. R. Yavagal MLA

Minister of State for Rural Development - Panchayati Raj and Housing of Karnataka
- In office 16 February 1986 – 29 June 1986

Member of the Karnataka Legislative Assembly
- In office 1983–1989
- Preceded by: B. R. Patil
- Succeeded by: Siddhanagouda Patil
- In office 1994–2004
- Preceded by: Siddhanagouda Patil
- Succeeded by: C. C. Patil
- In office 2013 – May 2018
- Preceded by: C. C. Patil
- Succeeded by: C. C. Patil

Personal details
- Born: 5 December 1947 (age 78) Javoor
- Party: Indian National Congress
- Education: Karnatak University
- Occupation: Member of Legislative Assembly

Basavaraddi Rangaraddi Yavagal (born 5 December 1947) is an Indian politician from Karnataka. He is the Ex. member of legislative assembly from Naragund assembly constituency, Karnataka. Yavagal has been the five term member of the Karnataka Legislative Assembly and has held the position of minister of Rural Development and Panchayat Raj and the minister for State Housing, Karnataka Government.

== Education and career ==
Yavagal received his Bachelor of Science (B.Sc.) degree from Karnatak University and Bachelor of Law (LL.B) degree from University College of Law, Dharwad. Afterwards, Yavagal enrolled himself as an Advocate with Karnataka Bar Council in 1971. He practiced law majorly in public interest litigations concerning farmers issues. Yavagal also led farmers' movement known as Naragund Bandaya and was made President of the 'Malaprabha Pradesha Raithara Horata Samiti' in 1980.

== Political career ==
Yavagal started his political career with Janata Party. In 1983, he won the Karnataka Legislative Assembly elections to become the first non-Congress member of legislative assembly from Naragund. In 1985, Yavagal won the assembly elections for the second consecutive term. During his second term as an MLA, Yavagal held key positions such as Minister for the Rural Development and Panchayat Raj (RDPR) and minister for State Housing in the Karnataka government. In 1986, Yavagal was appointed Deputy Speaker of the Karnataka State Assembly, a position which he held till 1988. In 1994, Yavagal was elected as an MLA for the third term, this time representing Janata Dal. After the dissolution of Janata Dal, Yavagal joined Indian National Congress and won the 1999 Karnataka assembly elections. In the 2013 Karnataka elections, Yavagal again won the election to become the MLA of Nargund legislative constituency for the fifth time. In 2016, Yavagal was appointed the Chairman of Hutti Gold Mines Limited.

== Personal life ==
Yavagal was married to Shashikala B Yavagal who died due to cancer in 2009. He has two daughters and a son.
