= Krishnarajpete Assembly constituency =

Legislative Assembly constituency in Karnataka, India

Coordinates: 12.66°N 76.49°E

Krishnarajpete
- Constituency No. 192 for the Karnataka Legislative Assembly

Constituency details
- Country: India
- Region: South India
- State: Karnataka
- District: Mandya
- Lok Sabha constituency: Mandya
- Established: 1951
- Total electors: 366,876 (2023)
- Reservation: None

Member of Legislative Assembly
- 16th Karnataka Legislative Assembly
- Incumbent Narayana Gowda
- Party: JD(S)
- Alliance: NDA
- Elected year: 2023
- Preceded by: H. T. Manjunath

Krishnarajpete Assembly constituency (also spelled Krishnaraja Pete, and often abbreviated to K R Pete or KR Pete) is one of the 224 constituencies in Karnataka Legislative Assembly in India. It is part of Mandya Lok Sabha constituency.

== Members of Legislative Assembly ==
Year	Member	Political party
1952	S. M. Lingappa	Indian National Congress
1957	M. K. Bomme Gowda	Indian National Congress
1962	N. Nanje Gowda	Independent politician
1967	M. K. Bomme Gowda	Independent politician
1972	S. M. Lnigappa	Indian National Congress
1978	S. M. Lnigappa	Janata Party
1983	M. Puttaswamy Gowda	Indian National Congress
1985	Krishna	Janata Party
1989	M. Puttaswamy Gowda	Indian National Congress
1994	Krishna	Janata Dal
1996 (Note: By-Election)	B. Prakash	Independent politician
1999	K. B. Chandrashekar	Indian National Congress
2004	Krishna	Janata Dal (Secular)
2008	K. B. Chandrashekar	Indian National Congress
2013	Dr. Narayana Gowda	Janata Dal (Secular)
2018	Dr. Narayana Gowda	Janata Dal (Secular)
2019	Dr. Narayana Gowda	Bharatiya Janata Party
2023	H. T. Manju	Janata Dal (Secular)

== Election results ==
=== Assembly Election 2023 ===
2023 Karnataka Legislative Assembly election : Krishnarajpete
Party	Candidate	Votes	%	±%
JD(S)	H. T. Manju	80,646	42.55%	▲8.79
INC	B. L. Devaraja	58,302	30.76%	▲5.80
BJP	Narayangowda	38,151	20.13%	▼19.46
Independent	Chandan Gowda. K	8,497	4.48%	New
BSP	Basthi Pradeepa	1,612	0.85%	New
NOTA	None of the above	713	0.38%	▼0.07
Margin of victory		22,344	11.79%	▲5.96
Turnout		189,608	86.19%	▲5.70
Total valid votes		189,545		
Registered electors		219,983		▲5.59
JD(S) gain from BJP		Swing	▲2.96	

=== Assembly By-election 2019 ===
2019 Karnataka Legislative Assembly by-election : Krishnarajpete
Party	Candidate	Votes	%	±%
BJP	Dr. Narayana Gowda	66,094	39.59%	▲33.95
JD(S)	B. L. Devaraja	56,363	33.76%	▼16.82
INC	K. B. Chandrashekar	41,665	24.96%	▼15.78
UPP	Chandre Gowda. H. M	1,020	0.61%	New
NOTA	None of the above	748	0.45%	▼0.18
Margin of victory		9,731	5.83%	▼4.01
Turnout		167,685	80.49%	▼4.18
Total valid votes		166,950		
Registered electors		208,343		▲1.36
BJP gain from JD(S)		Swing	▼10.99	

=== Assembly Election 2018 ===
2018 Karnataka Legislative Assembly election : Krishnarajpete
Party	Candidate	Votes	%	±%
JD(S)	Dr. Narayana Gowda	88,016	50.58%	▲14.14
INC	K. B. Chandrashekar	70,897	40.74%	▲10.23
BJP	B. C. Manju	9,819	5.64%	▲4.02
Independent	K. N. Shankaregowda	1,524	0.88%	New
Independent	Lokesh. B. N	1,139	0.65%	New
NOTA	None of the above	1,093	0.63%	New
Margin of victory		17,119	9.84%	▲3.91
Turnout		174,034	84.67%	▲3.10
Total valid votes		174,003		
Registered electors		205,554		▲8.68
JD(S) hold		Swing	▲14.14	

=== Assembly Election 2013 ===
2013 Karnataka Legislative Assembly election : Krishnarajpete
Party	Candidate	Votes	%	±%
JD(S)	Dr. Narayana Gowda	56,784	36.44%	▲2.97
INC	K. B. Chandrashekar	47,541	30.51%	▼5.21
Independent	Krishna	37,764	24.24%	New
Independent	Lokesh. B. N	3,612	2.32%	New
BJP	Varadarajegowda	2,519	1.62%	▼18.34
Independent	G. C. Asha	2,232	1.43%	New
Independent	Manjulamma	1,736	1.11%	New
BSRCP	K. Keshava	1,294	0.83%	New
Margin of victory		9,243	5.93%	▲3.68
Turnout		154,279	81.57%	▲3.52
Total valid votes		155,814		
Registered electors		189,137		▲8.54
JD(S) gain from INC		Swing	▲0.72	

=== Assembly Election 2008 ===
2008 Karnataka Legislative Assembly election : Krishnarajpete
Party	Candidate	Votes	%	±%
INC	K. B. Chandrashekar	48,556	35.72%	▲11.21
JD(S)	Krishna	45,500	33.47%	▲4.43
BJP	B. Prakash	27,131	19.96%	▲0.80
BSP	Dr. Narayana Gowda	10,218	7.52%	▲5.08
Independent	Manjulamma	2,306	1.70%	New
Kannada Chalavali Vatal Paksha	Javare Gowda	957	0.70%	New
Margin of victory		3,056	2.25%	▼2.28
Turnout		136,010	78.05%	▲5.84
Total valid votes		135,953		
Registered electors		174,250		▲5.16
INC gain from JD(S)		Swing	▲6.68	

=== Assembly Election 2004 ===
2004 Karnataka Legislative Assembly election : Krishnarajpete
Party	Candidate	Votes	%	±%
JD(S)	Krishna	34,738	29.04%	▲1.76
INC	K. B. Chandrashekar	29,324	24.51%	▼18.77
Independent	B. Prakash	26,552	22.19%	New
BJP	Srinivas. K	22,921	19.16%	▲11.30
BSP	Shivakumar. K	2,917	2.44%	▼1.61
Kannada Nadu Party	Chandrashekar. K. P	1,713	1.43%	New
Independent	Manjulamma	1,476	1.23%	New
Margin of victory		5,414	4.53%	▼11.46
Turnout		119,651	72.21%	▼0.43
Total valid votes		119,641		
Registered electors		165,703		▲7.71
JD(S) gain from INC		Swing	▼14.24	

=== Assembly Election 1999 ===
1999 Karnataka Legislative Assembly election : Krishnarajpete
Party	Candidate	Votes	%	±%
INC	K. B. Chandrashekar	45,683	43.28%	▲24.46
JD(S)	B. L. Devaraja	28,802	27.28%	New
Independent	B. Prakash	18,502	17.53%	New
BJP	B. Nanjappa	8,297	7.86%	▼3.79
BSP	K. J. Vijayakumar	4,276	4.05%	New
Margin of victory		16,881	15.99%	▲13.44
Turnout		111,745	72.64%	▲1.33
Total valid votes		105,560		
Rejected ballots		6,104	5.46%	▲3.86
Registered electors		153,844		▲7.65
INC gain from Independent		Swing	▲13.84	

=== Assembly By-election 1996 ===
1996 Karnataka Legislative Assembly by-election : Krishnarajpete
Party	Candidate	Votes	%	±%
Independent	B. Prakash	29,524	29.44%	New
JD	B. Javarayee Gowda	26,969	26.89%	▼28.17
INC	A. B. Javarappa	18,868	18.82%	▲0.63
BJP	M. B. Gowda	11,684	11.65%	▼9.32
KRRS	K. R. Jayaramu	6,551	6.53%	New
Independent	Basthi Rangappa	3,523	3.51%	New
Independent	M. Puttaswamy Gowda	3,159	3.15%	New
Margin of victory		2,555	2.55%	▼31.55
Turnout		101,907	71.31%	▼7.70
Total valid votes		100,278		
Rejected ballots		1,629	1.60%	▲0.04
Registered electors		142,913		▲2.26
Independent gain from JD		Swing	▼25.62	

=== Assembly Election 1994 ===
1994 Karnataka Legislative Assembly election : Krishnarajpete
Party	Candidate	Votes	%	±%
JD	Krishna	59,841	55.06%	▲30.26
BJP	Kengegowda. K. N	22,785	20.97%	New
INC	K. B. Chandrashekar	19,773	18.19%	▼22.32
BSP	Rangaiah. B. J	3,798	3.49%	New
INC	Doddaswamy Gowda Md	1,625	1.50%	New
Independent	Basava Raju. P. D	792	0.73%	New
Margin of victory		37,056	34.10%	▲28.27
Turnout		110,414	79.01%	▲3.02
Total valid votes		108,678		
Rejected ballots		1,721	1.56%	▼3.19
Registered electors		139,754		▲13.95
JD gain from INC		Swing	▲14.55	

=== Assembly Election 1989 ===
1989 Karnataka Legislative Assembly election : Krishnarajpete
Party	Candidate	Votes	%	±%
INC	M. Puttaswamy Gowda	35,963	40.51%	▲1.97
JP	K. N. Kenge Gowda	30,791	34.69%	New
JD	Krishna	22,015	24.80%	New
Margin of victory		5,172	5.83%	▼17.08
Turnout		93,193	75.99%	▲0.14
Total valid votes		88,769		
Rejected ballots		4,424	4.75%	▲3.16
Registered electors		122,643		▲28.41
INC gain from JP		Swing	▼20.95	

=== Assembly Election 1985 ===
1985 Karnataka Legislative Assembly election : Krishnarajpete
Party	Candidate	Votes	%	±%
JP	Krishna	43,817	61.46%	▲19.08
INC	M. Puttaswamy Gowda	27,482	38.54%	▼13.27
Margin of victory		16,335	22.91%	▲13.48
Turnout		72,449	75.85%	▲3.01
Total valid votes		71,299		
Rejected ballots		1,150	1.59%	▼0.49
Registered electors		95,510		▲12.05
JP gain from INC		Swing	▲9.65	

=== Assembly Election 1983 ===
1983 Karnataka Legislative Assembly election : Krishnarajpete
Party	Candidate	Votes	%	±%
INC	M. Puttaswamy Gowda	31,499	51.81%	▲31.45
JP	Krishna	25,766	42.38%	▼0.98
LKD	G. Rajegowda	2,200	3.62%	New
Independent	G. P. Jagadish	699	1.15%	New
INC(J)	K. S. Mallaiah	630	1.04%	New
Margin of victory		5,733	9.43%	▼0.95
Turnout		62,087	72.84%	▼6.10
Total valid votes		60,794		
Rejected ballots		1,293	2.08%	▼0.13
Registered electors		85,242		▲8.26
INC gain from JP		Swing	▲8.45	

=== Assembly Election 1978 ===
1978 Karnataka Legislative Assembly election : Krishnarajpete
Party	Candidate	Votes	%	±%
JP	S. M. Lingappa	26,352	43.36%	New
INC(I)	K. Ujjinilingeswar	20,040	32.97%	New
INC	A. B. Javarappa	12,373	20.36%	▼45.27
Independent	G. Rajegowda	2,016	3.32%	New
Margin of victory		6,312	10.38%	▼20.88
Turnout		62,154	78.94%	▲12.86
Total valid votes		60,781		
Rejected ballots		1,373	2.21%	▲2.21
Registered electors		78,739		▲13.56
JP gain from INC		Swing	▼22.27	

=== Assembly Election 1972 ===
1972 Mysore State Legislative Assembly election : Krishnarajpete
Party	Candidate	Votes	%	±%
INC	S. M. Lnigappa	29,424	65.63%	▲38.24
Independent	M. K. Bommognoa	15,410	34.37%	New
Margin of victory		14,014	31.26%	▼12.04
Turnout		45,821	66.08%	▼6.03
Total valid votes		44,834		
Registered electors		69,338		▲15.17
INC gain from Independent		Swing	▼5.06	

=== Assembly Election 1967 ===
1967 Mysore State Legislative Assembly election : Krishnarajpete
Party	Candidate	Votes	%	±%
Independent	M. K. Bomme Gowda	28,512	70.69%	New
INC	S. M. Lingappa	11,048	27.39%	▼19.41
Independent	C. Kondaiah	776	1.92%	New
Margin of victory		17,464	43.30%	▲36.89
Turnout		43,413	72.11%	▲6.89
Total valid votes		40,336		
Registered electors		60,205		▲8.16
Independent hold		Swing	▲17.49	

=== Assembly Election 1962 ===
1962 Mysore State Legislative Assembly election : Krishnarajpete
Party	Candidate	Votes	%	±%
Independent	N. Nanje Gowda	18,236	53.20%	New
INC	M. K. Bomme Gowda	16,040	46.80%	▼12.77
Margin of victory		2,196	6.41%	▼28.12
Turnout		36,303	65.22%	▲3.83
Total valid votes		34,276		
Registered electors		55,663		▲16.88
Independent gain from INC		Swing	▼6.37	

=== Assembly Election 1957 ===
1957 Mysore State Legislative Assembly election : Krishnarajpete
Party	Candidate	Votes	%	±%
INC	M. K. Bomme Gowda	17,419	59.57%	▲16.40
Independent	N. Nanje Gowda	7,323	25.05%	New
PSP	K. L. Nanjappa Nadig	4,497	15.38%	New
Margin of victory		10,096	34.53%	▲20.32
Turnout		29,239	61.39%	▲10.23
Total valid votes		29,239		
Registered electors		47,625		▼6.56
INC hold		Swing	▲16.40	

=== Assembly Election 1952 ===
1952 Mysore State Legislative Assembly election : Krishnarajpete
Party	Candidate	Votes	%	±%
INC	S. M. Lingappa	11,258	43.17%	New
Independent	B. Kempegowda	7,552	28.96%	New
KMPP	K. L. Nanjappa Nadig	5,433	20.84%	New
Independent	H. Boregowda	1,833	7.03%	New
Margin of victory		3,706	14.21%	
Turnout		26,076	51.16%	
Total valid votes		26,076		
Registered electors		50,968		
INC win (new seat)				

== See also ==
- List of constituencies of Karnataka Legislative Assembly
