= Karadagi =

- village
- Country: India
- State: Karnataka
- District: Haveri
- Talukas: Savanur

Population (2001)
  - Total: 5,451

Languages
  - Official: Kannada
- Time zone: UTC+5:30 (IST)

Karadagi is a village in the southern state of Karnataka, India. It is located in the Savanur taluk of Haveri district in Karnataka.

== Demographics ==
As of 2001 India census, Karadagi had a population of 5451 with 2822 males and 2629 females.

== See also ==
- Haveri
- Districts of Karnataka
