= Nargund Assembly constituency =

Constituency of the Karnataka legislative assembly in India

Coordinates: 15.72°N 75.39°E

Nargund
- Constituency No. 68 for the Karnataka Legislative Assembly

Constituency details
- Country: India
- Region: South India
- State: Karnataka
- District: Gadag
- Lok Sabha constituency: Bagalkot
- Established: 1956
- Total electors: 187,212
- Reservation: None

Member of Legislative Assembly
- 16th Karnataka Legislative Assembly
- Incumbent C. C. Patil
- Party: Bharatiya Janata Party
- Elected year: 2023
- Preceded by: B. R. Yavagal

Nargund Assembly constituency is one of the 224 constituencies in the Karnataka Legislative Assembly of Karnataka, a southern state of India. It is also part of Bagalkot Lok Sabha constituency.

== Members of the Legislative Assembly ==
Election	Member	Party
1952	Adiveppagouda Siddanagouda Patil	Indian National Congress
1957	Adiveppagouda Siddanagouda Patil	Indian National Congress
1962	Adiveppagouda Siddanagouda Patil	Indian National Congress
1967	D. R. Veerappa	Indian National Congress
1972	J. Y. Venkappa	Indian National Congress
1978	B. R. Patil	Indian National Congress
1983	B. R. Yavagal	Janata Party
1985	B. R. Yavagal	Janata Party
1989	Siddanagouda Fakiragouda Patil	Indian National Congress
1994	B. R. Yavagal	Janata Dal
1999	B. R. Yavagal	Indian National Congress
2004	C. C. Patil	Bharatiya Janata Party
2008	C. C. Patil	Bharatiya Janata Party
2013	B. R. Yavagal	Indian National Congress
2018	C. C. Patil	Bharatiya Janata Party
2023	C. C. Patil	Bharatiya Janata Party

== Election results ==
=== Assembly Election 2023 ===
2023 Karnataka Legislative Assembly election : Nargund
Party	Candidate	Votes	%	±%
BJP	C. C. Patil	72,835	48.48%	▼2.04
INC	B. R. Yavagal	71,044	47.29%	▲2.29
NOTA	None of the above	1,769	1.18%	▲0.37
Independent	Veeresh Sobaradamath	1,663	1.11%	New
Independent	Shivanand. Shiddappa. Mayannavar	1,005	0.67%	New
Margin of victory		1,791	1.19%	▼4.33
Turnout		150,315	80.29%	▲3.23
Total valid votes		150,236		
Registered electors		187,212		▼0.24
BJP hold		Swing	▼2.04	

=== Assembly Election 2018 ===
2018 Karnataka Legislative Assembly election : Nargund
Party	Candidate	Votes	%	±%
BJP	C. C. Patil	73,045	50.52%	▲13.36
INC	Basavaraddi Rangaraddi Yavagal	65,066	45.00%	▲1.59
JD(S)	Girimallanagouda Ishwaragouda Patil	2,456	1.70%	▼0.47
NOTA	None of the above	1,173	0.81%	New
SS	Danappagouda Bheemanagouda Danappagoudar	903	0.62%	New
Margin of victory		7,979	5.52%	▼0.73
Turnout		144,602	77.06%	▲2.13
Total valid votes		144,595		
Registered electors		187,655		▲9.29
BJP gain from INC		Swing	▲7.11	

=== Assembly Election 2013 ===
2013 Karnataka Legislative Assembly election : Nargund
Party	Candidate	Votes	%	±%
INC	B. R. Yavagal	59,620	43.41%	▲24.17
BJP	C. C. Patil	51,035	37.16%	▼6.22
BSRCP	S. H. Shivanagoudar	6,908	5.03%	New
Independent	V. R. Ramananda	3,410	2.48%	New
JD(S)	Prakash Ningappa Kari	2,976	2.17%	▼0.46
Independent	Suresh Maharudrappa Mundaragi	1,449	1.05%	New
KJP	Kuberagouda Shivanagouda Parwatgoudra	1,054	0.77%	New
LJP	Kadiyavar Hemantha Mallappa	931	0.68%	New
Margin of victory		8,585	6.25%	▼10.07
Turnout		128,666	74.93%	▲3.58
Total valid votes		137,347		
Registered electors		171,706		▲13.43
INC gain from BJP		Swing	▲0.03	

=== Assembly Election 2008 ===
2008 Karnataka Legislative Assembly election : Nargund
Party	Candidate	Votes	%	±%
BJP	C. C. Patil	46,824	43.38%	▼10.98
Independent	B. R. Yavagal	29,210	27.06%	New
INC	Patil Shiddlinganagouda Shiddanagouda	20,770	19.24%	▼19.93
JD(S)	M. S. Patil	2,834	2.63%	▼0.24
Independent	Suneel Laxmansa Dhongadi	2,334	2.16%	New
Independent	Desai Laxmappayya Rangappayya	1,369	1.27%	New
Independent	Rachappa Mahadevappa Kori	1,304	1.21%	New
BSP	Javoor Shivappa Shantappa	1,291	1.20%	New
Independent	Leelakka Karbasappa Hasabi	1,001	0.93%	New
Margin of victory		17,614	16.32%	▲1.13
Turnout		108,006	71.35%	▲0.63
Total valid votes		107,932		
Registered electors		151,375		▲34.09
BJP hold		Swing	▼10.98	

=== Assembly Election 2004 ===
2004 Karnataka Legislative Assembly election : Nargund
Party	Candidate	Votes	%	±%
BJP	C. C. Patil	43,382	54.36%	▲49.70
INC	B. R. Yavagal	31,260	39.17%	▼12.70
JD(S)	Somapur Basavaraddi Vankaraddi	2,291	2.87%	▼32.44
Kannada Nadu Party	Somanakatti Sharada	1,653	2.07%	New
JP	Totanagowd Sankanagowd Channappagowdra	1,214	1.52%	New
Margin of victory		12,122	15.19%	▼1.38
Turnout		79,832	70.72%	▲0.20
Total valid votes		79,800		
Registered electors		112,888		▲11.53
BJP gain from INC		Swing	▲2.49	

=== Assembly Election 1999 ===
1999 Karnataka Legislative Assembly election : Nargund
Party	Candidate	Votes	%	±%
INC	B. R. Yavagal	34,870	51.87%	▲23.97
JD(S)	C. C. Patil	23,734	35.31%	New
JD(U)	Asuti Neelakantappa Shivappa	3,297	4.90%	New
BJP	Leelakka Karbasappa Hasabi	3,130	4.66%	▼3.53
Independent	R. M. Kori	1,612	2.40%	New
Independent	Rajashekar Mudakappa Homakeri	578	0.86%	New
Margin of victory		11,136	16.57%	▼11.56
Turnout		71,378	70.52%	▲1.93
Total valid votes		67,221		
Rejected ballots		4,143	5.80%	▲3.39
Registered electors		101,216		▲2.17
INC gain from JD		Swing	▼4.16	

=== Assembly Election 1994 ===
1994 Karnataka Legislative Assembly election : Nargund
Party	Candidate	Votes	%	±%
JD	B. R. Yavagal	37,154	56.03%	▲8.45
INC	V. A. Mattikatti	18,502	27.90%	▼20.79
BJP	S. H. Hurali	5,433	8.19%	New
INC	J. P. Belavatagi	2,088	3.15%	New
KRRS	B. G. Chowkimath	1,327	2.00%	New
Independent	H. R. Mudaraddi	815	1.23%	New
Margin of victory		18,652	28.13%	▲27.02
Turnout		67,946	68.59%	▼1.84
Total valid votes		66,311		
Rejected ballots		1,635	2.41%	▼2.86
Registered electors		99,066		▲6.26
JD gain from INC		Swing	▲7.34	

=== Assembly Election 1989 ===
1989 Karnataka Legislative Assembly election : Nargund
Party	Candidate	Votes	%	±%
INC	Siddanagouda Fakiragouda Patil	30,284	48.69%	▲18.21
JD	B. R. Yavagal	29,595	47.58%	New
JP	Patil Annappaggouda Onkaragouda	1,262	2.03%	New
Kranti Sabha	Hebbal Venkaraddi Bhimaraddi	838	1.35%	New
Margin of victory		689	1.11%	▼36.95
Turnout		65,660	70.43%	▼3.29
Total valid votes		62,197		
Rejected ballots		3,463	5.27%	▲2.91
Registered electors		93,229		▲26.00
INC gain from JP		Swing	▼19.85	

=== Assembly Election 1985 ===
1985 Karnataka Legislative Assembly election : Nargund
Party	Candidate	Votes	%	±%
JP	B. R. Yavagal	36,506	68.54%	▲13.52
INC	Katarki. S. N	16,234	30.48%	▼3.87
Margin of victory		20,272	38.06%	▲17.39
Turnout		54,547	73.72%	▲10.20
Total valid votes		53,261		
Rejected ballots		1,286	2.36%	▼0.33
Registered electors		73,992		▲10.98
JP hold		Swing	▲13.52	

=== Assembly Election 1983 ===
1983 Karnataka Legislative Assembly election : Nargund
Party	Candidate	Votes	%	±%
JP	B. R. Yavagal	22,675	55.02%	▲20.43
INC	B. R. Patil	14,156	34.35%	▲14.46
Independent	Arabajamadar Abubakkaradsab Hazihasimsab	2,728	6.62%	New
Independent	Angadi Shivanand Ishwappa	890	2.16%	New
Independent	Jogi Sangappa Mallappa	584	1.42%	New
Margin of victory		8,519	20.67%	▲18.33
Turnout		42,351	63.52%	▼11.16
Total valid votes		41,211		
Rejected ballots		1,140	2.69%	▼0.78
Registered electors		66,673		▲7.60
JP gain from INC(I)		Swing	▲18.09	

=== Assembly Election 1978 ===
1978 Karnataka Legislative Assembly election : Nargund
Party	Candidate	Votes	%	±%
INC(I)	B. R. Patil	16,496	36.93%	New
JP	Patil Parwatagouda Linganagouda	15,450	34.59%	New
INC	Patil Linganagouda Siddanagouda	8,887	19.89%	▼40.16
Independent	Budial Siddappa Tirakappa	3,479	7.79%	New
Independent	Asuti Basappa Maritammappa	358	0.80%	New
Margin of victory		1,046	2.34%	▼17.77
Turnout		46,277	74.68%	▲15.37
Total valid votes		44,670		
Rejected ballots		1,607	3.47%	▲3.47
Registered electors		61,965		▲5.61
INC(I) gain from INC		Swing	▼23.12	

=== Assembly Election 1972 ===
1972 Mysore State Legislative Assembly election : Nargund
Party	Candidate	Votes	%	±%
INC	J. Y. Venkappa	20,070	60.05%	▼13.47
INC(O)	Bhaskar Mudiyappa Pujar	13,350	39.95%	New
Margin of victory		6,720	20.11%	▼29.35
Turnout		34,803	59.31%	▲17.51
Total valid votes		33,420		
Registered electors		58,675		▲13.31
INC hold		Swing	▼13.47	

=== Assembly Election 1967 ===
1967 Mysore State Legislative Assembly election : Nargund
Party	Candidate	Votes	%	±%
INC	D. R. Veerappa	14,402	73.52%	▲0.12
SSP	M. M. Mudakappa	4,714	24.06%	New
RPI	H. S. Deviningaiah	473	2.41%	New
Margin of victory		9,688	49.46%	▼0.22
Turnout		21,644	41.80%	▼18.87
Total valid votes		19,589		
Registered electors		51,782		▼12.51
INC hold		Swing	▲0.12	

=== Assembly Election 1962 ===
1962 Mysore State Legislative Assembly election : Nargund
Party	Candidate	Votes	%	±%
INC	Adiveppagouda Siddanagouda Patil	24,601	73.40%	▲5.66
Independent	Shiddangouda Hanamantgouda Patil	7,951	23.72%	New
ABJS	Mahantappa Gurubasappa Kallur	590	1.76%	New
Independent	Maruti Gurunathappa Rahul	373	1.11%	New
Margin of victory		16,650	49.68%	▲14.20
Turnout		35,911	60.67%	▲9.81
Total valid votes		33,515		
Registered electors		59,186		▲12.38
INC hold		Swing	▲5.66	

=== Assembly Election 1957 ===
1957 Mysore State Legislative Assembly election : Nargund
Party	Candidate	Votes	%	±%
INC	Adiveppagouda Siddanagouda Patil	18,143	67.74%	▼2.53
Independent	Patil Shiddangouda Hanmantgouda	8,640	32.26%	New
Margin of victory		9,503	35.48%	▼5.06
Turnout		26,783	50.86%	▼12.77
Total valid votes		26,783		
Registered electors		52,665		▼7.93
INC hold		Swing	▼2.53	

=== Assembly Election 1952 ===
1952 Bombay State Legislative Assembly election : Navalgund Nargund
Party	Candidate	Votes	%	±%
INC	Adiveppagouda Siddanagouda Patil	25,576	70.27%	New
KMPP	Nalawadi, Girmallappa Rachappa	10,822	29.73%	New
Margin of victory		14,754	40.54%	
Turnout		36,398	63.63%	
Total valid votes		36,398		
Registered electors		57,201		
INC win (new seat)				

== See also ==
- Nargund
- Gadag district
- List of constituencies of Karnataka Legislative Assembly
