= Abdul Nazir Sab =

Former Karnataka minister

Minister for Rural Development and Panchayat Raj
- In office 1983–1985

President of the Town Municipal Council, Gundlupet

Organizing Secretary of the Congress Committee, Mysore

President of Karnataka Kranti Ranga

Personal details
- Born: 25 December 1934 Ayanavaram, Madras Presidency, British India
- Died: 25 October 1988 (aged 53) Bangalore, Karnataka, India
- Party: Janata Party
- Spouse: Ashraf Jehan Begum
- Children: 5
- Profession: Politician; agriculturist

Abdul Nazir Sab (25 December 1934 – 25 October 1988), a.k.a. Neer Sab, was an Indian politician, agriculturist, and member of the Janata Party who served as the Minister for Rural Development and Panchayat Raj in the Ramakrishna Hegde Cabinet from 1983 to 1985. He was a pioneer in advocating for the implementation of the Panchayat Raj system and the decentralization of political power.

== Early life ==
Nazir Sab was born on 25 December 1934, in Ayanavaram, in the Madras Presidency of British India (in present-day Tamil Nadu, India). He was commonly referred to as Neer Sab, meaning water in Kannada, due to his efforts in promoting the installation of hand pumps in every village.

== Political career ==
Nazir Sab's political journey began as a social worker. He was mostly active in the education field. He would also organize farm laborers and advocate for the upliftment of marginalized communities. He served as the President of the Town Municipal Council, Gundlupet, and was the Organizing Secretary of the Congress Committee in Mysore. After completing his term as a Member of the Legislative Council (MLC) during Gundu Rao's regime, he left the Congress (I) and joined the Janata-Ranga alliance. He was the President of Karnataka Kranti Ranga.

Ramakrishna Hegde was the Chief Minister of Karnataka when the Janata Party came to power in 1983. His government focused on social welfare and rural development. In 1983, Nazir Sab was appointed as the Rural Development and Panchayat Raj Minister. During his tenure, he introduced a scheme for decentralized democracy across the country. Under his leadership, the Panchayat Raj Institution was empowered. Karnataka was one of the first states to implement the Panchayat Raj system in India by enacting the Karnataka Zilla Parishads, Taluk Panchayat Samithies, Mandal Panchayats, and Nyaya Panchayats Act, 1985, commonly known as the Act of 1983. This legislation was based on the recommendations of the Ashok Mehta Committee and was drafted by Nazir Sab. The bill was introduced in the State Assembly in 1983, and the Act received the assent of the President of India in 1985.

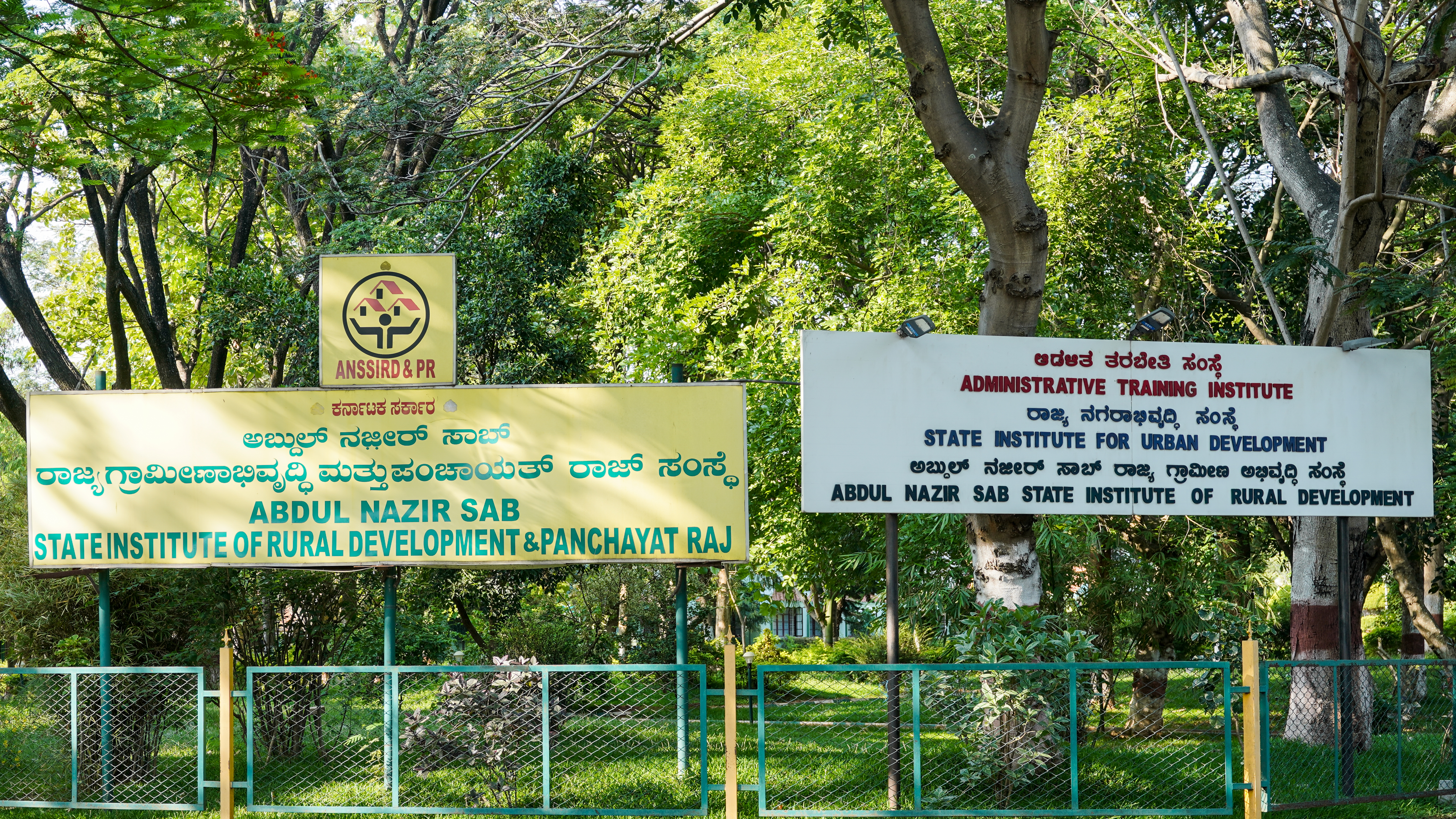
Sign boards, Administrative Training Institute, Abdul Nazir Sab State Institute of Rural Development & Panchayat Raj (ANSSIRD&PR), Mysore, Karnataka

== Death ==
Nazir Sab was diagnosed with cancer and went to the US for treatment. In his final days, he returned to his native Gundlupet. He was admitted to the Kidwai Memorial Institute of Oncology in Bangalore, where he died on 25 October 1988, at the age of 54. He was survived by his wife, Ashraf Jehan Begum, one son, and four daughters. In 2005, a statue of Nazir Sab was placed at the Zilla Panchayat office in Bangalore. The Abdul Nazir Sab State Institute of Rural Development and Panchayat Raj was set up in Mysore in 1989 after his name. The institute provides training in rural development and decentralized governance for elected representatives of Panchayat Raj Institutions.

The Government of Karnataka created a chair at the Centre for Multi-disciplinary Development Research (CMDR) to conduct research on various aspects of decentralized decision-making.
