= Abhayachandra Jain =

Indian politician

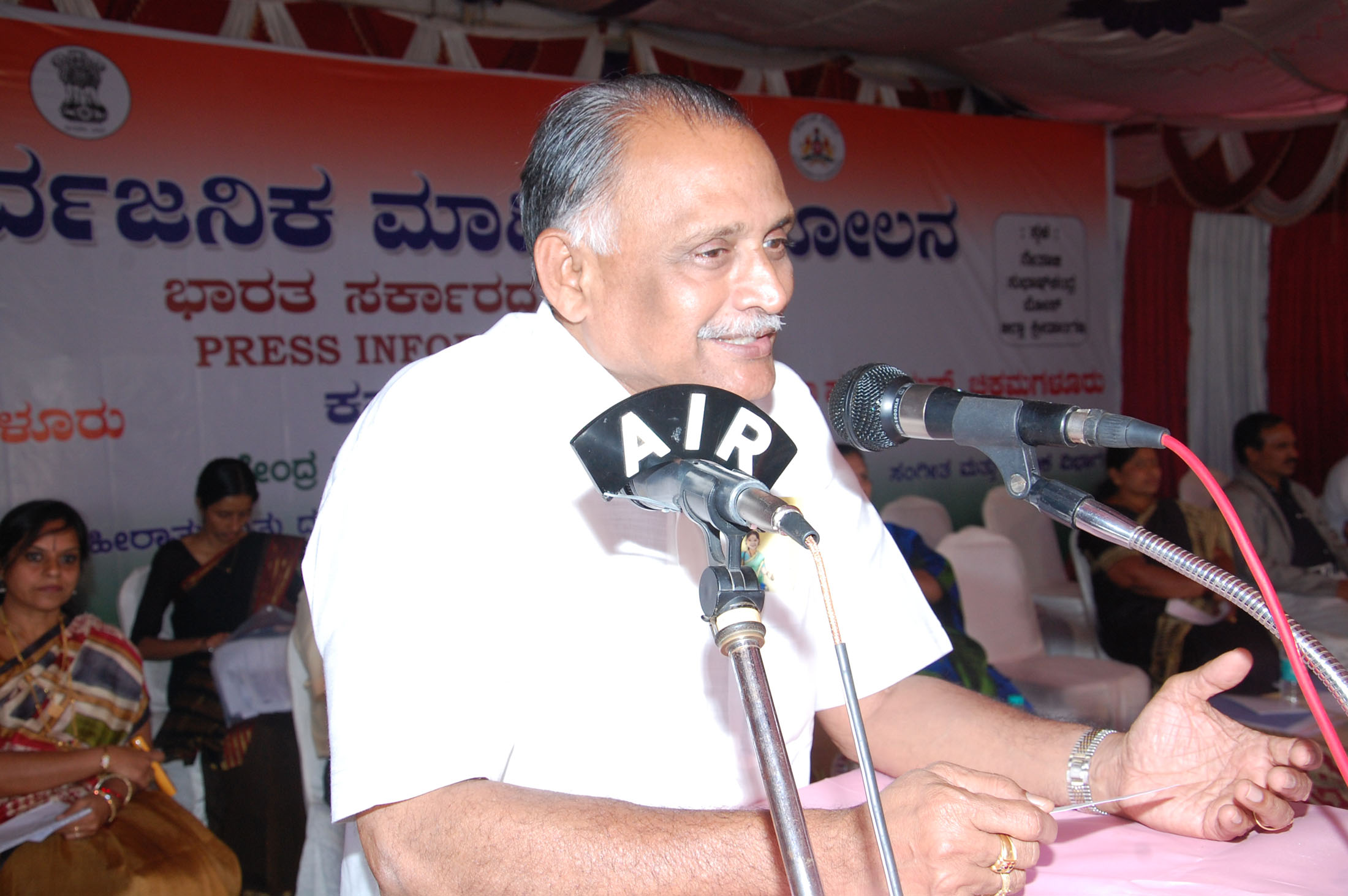
- Abhayachandra Jain in 2014

Minister for Fisheries Youth services Sports in the Government of Karnataka
- In office 18 May 2013 – Jun 19 2016

Member of the Karnataka Legislative Assembly
- In office 2013–2018

Personal details
- Party: Indian National Congress
- Occupation: Politician

Abhayachandra Jain is an Indian Politician from the state of Karnataka. He was a member of the Karnataka Legislative Assembly representing the Moodabidri constituency. He is the honourable president of excellent PU college Moodbidri.

== Political party ==
He is from the Indian National Congress however in recent years has taken a step back from active politics.

== Ministry ==
He was the Minister for Fisheries, Youth Services & Sports in the K. Siddaramaiah led Karnataka Government.
