= A. Lakshmisagar =

Former Karnataka minister

Minister of Law & Parliamentary Affairs Government of Karnataka

Member of Karnataka Legislative Assembly
- In office 1978–1989
- Constituency: Chickpet Assembly constituency

Corporator
- In office 1972–1975
- Constituency: Chickpet Assembly constituency

Member of Karnataka Legislative Council
- In office 1996–2002

Rajya Sabha Member
- Incumbent
- Assumed office 2007

Personal details
- Born: Chikkakondappa; 8 December 1927; Lakshmisagar, near Varalakonda, India
- Died: 12 September 2008 (aged 80)
- Political party: Janata Party
- Education: Law degree
- Profession: Advocate and professor of law
- Portfolio: Law and Parliamentary Affairs, Housing, Revenue and Public Grievances, and Urban Development

A. Lakshmisagar was an Indian politician, advocate, and professor of law. He was a member of the Janata Party and served as the Law Minister in the Ramakrishna Hegde cabinet. He also served as a corporator from 1972 to 1975. He was elected three times consecutively as an MLA to the Karnataka Legislative Assembly from the Chikpet constituency in 1978, 1983 and 1985. During his career, he held multiple portfolios including Law and Parliamentary Affairs, Housing, Revenue and Public Grievances, and Urban Development. He once served as the Chief Minister's representative (acting Chief Minister) when Ramakrishna went on an official trip abroad.

== Early life ==
Lakshmisagar was born on 8 December 1927, in Lakshmisagar village near Varalakonda. His original name was Chikkakondappa, which was later changed to Lakshmisagar after the village's name. He finished his primary education in Varalakonda and Beachaganahalli and then went to Bangalore for higher and legal education. While still in college, he started working part-time jobs to cover his education and living expenses. He also tutored children and used that money to pay for his studies. He obtained a law degree from Bangalore and later started working as a lecturer.

== Political career ==
Lakshmisagar began his political career in the 1970s and was elected as a Bangalore City Municipal Councilor from the Chikkapet ward. He later contested elections from Chikkapet in 1978, 1983, and 1985 and was elected as an MLA for three consecutive terms. He also served as the opposition leader in the Karnataka Legislative Assembly from 1982 to 1983 during Gundu Rao's government. He was also a member of the Vidhan Parishad from 1996 to 2002.

== Death ==
Lakshmisagar died on 12 September 2008 at the state-run Bowring Hospital in Bangalore at the age of 80 after a cardiac arrest. Lakshmisagar was a bachelor. During his political tenure, he established government schools in Varalakonda and Somenahalli with his special grant in 2007 when he was a Rajya Sabha member. In recognition of his contributions, a statue in his honor was erected on the school campus.
