= K. Amarnath Shetty =

Indian politician (died 2020)

Kodman Amarnath Shetty (1939/1940 – January 27, 2020) was an Indian politician who served as a minister in the Government of Karnataka. He was the President of Rotary Educational institution Moodabidri. He was one of the main members of JDS Party in Karnataka.

== Biography ==
Amarnath grew up in Moodabidri. He entered politics in 1965 and went on to become the President of Paladka Panchayath in Karkala Taluk, Chairman of Moodbidri Town Panchayath, President of Taluk Marketing Society, Karkala, Co-operative Service Bank and District Janata Party of Dakshina Kannada. In 1983 he was elected to the Karnataka Legislative Assembly from Moodbidri constituency for the first time. He was again re-elected to assembly for the same constituency in 1987 and 1994. During his term as a legislator, he also served as Minister of the Karnataka Government holding various portfolios namely the Ministry for Tourism and Religious Endowment.
