= M. Raghupathy =

Indian politician (1941–2022)

Minister of Education
- In office 1976–1982

Member of the Legislative Assembly
- In office 1985–1983
- Constituency: Shivajinagar
- In office 1985–1989
- Constituency: Malleshwaram

Personal details
- Born: 1941 Yeswanthpur, Bangalore
- Died: 18 June 2022 (aged 80–81) Malleswaram
- Party: Janata Parivar
- Occupation: Politician

M. Raghupathy (1941 – 18 June 2022) was an Indian politician and senior leader of the erstwhile Janata Parivar (JNP) who served as the Higher Education Minister in the cabinet of former Chief Minister Ramakrishna Hegde from 1976 to 1982. He also served as MLC and was elected twice as MLA to the Karnataka Legislative Assembly, once from the Shivajinagar constituency in 1983 and once from the Malleshwaram constituency in 1985. He was known to be close to former Andhra Pradesh Chief Minister N. T. Rama Rao.

== Early life ==
Raghupathy was born in Yeswanthpur, Bangalore. He had an interest in sports from his school time. He pursued his studies in law.

== Political career ==
Raghupathi's political journey began in 1969 when he joined the Congress Party by attending a requisition meeting of the All India Congress Committee. In 1969, he was appointed as the Karnataka Pradesh Youth Congress secretary. In 1970, he served as the founder convener of NSUI (Karnataka) and later led a selected student team to visit Expo 70. He also participated in a 7-day hunger strike in 1970 as part of the student movement advocating for student welfare schemes, which led to the appointment of the John Mathai Committee by the Government in 1971. In 1973, he was appointed as the general secretary of the Karnataka Pradesh Youth Congress. In 1974, he served as the Congress Performance secretary, and in 1975, he served as the General Secretary of the Indian Youth Congress. He was also the President of Karanatka Pradesh Youth Congress Committee.

From 1976 to 1982, he served as the Minister of Education and Information in the Government of Karnataka.

He first became an MLA in 1983 as a candidate of the JNP. He won by a margin of 7527 votes and represented the Shivajinagar constituency from 1983 to 1985. In 1985, he again contested as a JNP candidate, this time for the Malleshwaram constituency in the assembly election. He defeated the Indian National Congress party candidate Vijoilakshami Ram Bhat by a significant margin of 21,699 votes and represented the Malleshwaram constituency from 1985 to 1989. During his time as an MLA, he introduced free uniforms for students in state-run schools and provided free textbooks for children in government schools.

In 1989, he ran for the Lok Sabha election from Bangalore South and in 1999, for the Vidhan Sabha election from Malleswaram, but he did not win either election.

== Death ==
Raghupati died on 18 June 2022, at the age of 81 at his residence in Malleswaram.
