= S. R. Bommai =

Indian politician (1924–2007)

Somappa Rayappa Bommai
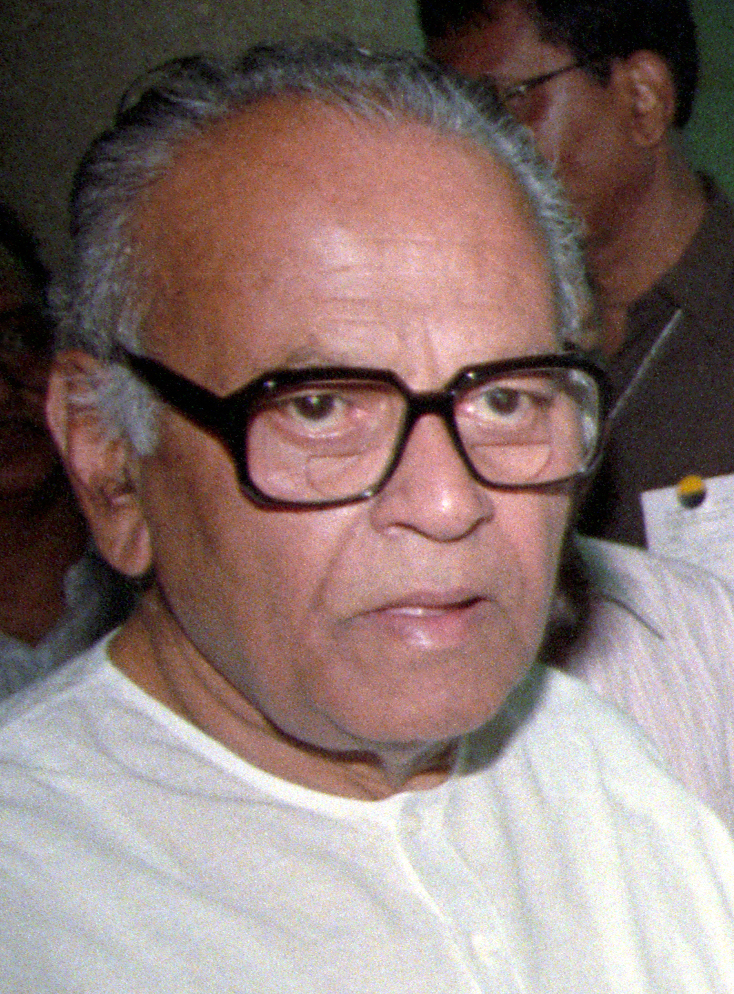

Union Minister of Human Resource Development
- In office 5 June 1996 – 19 March 1998
- Prime Minister: H. D. Deve Gowda; I. K. Gujral
- Preceded by: Atal Bihari Vajpayee
- Succeeded by: Murli Manohar Joshi
- Constituency: Orissa (Rajya Sabha)

4th Chief Minister of Karnataka
- In office 13 August 1988 – 21 April 1989
- Preceded by: Ramakrishna Hegde
- Succeeded by: Veerendra Patil

Member of Parliament, Rajya Sabha
- In office 2 July 1992 – 2 April 1998
- Constituency: Odisha
- In office 3 April 1998 – 2 April 2004
- Constituency: Karnataka

Member of the Karnataka Legislative Assembly for Hubli Rural
- In office 1978–1989
- Preceded by: G. Rangaswamy Sandra
- Succeeded by: G. Rangaswamy Sandra

President of Janata Dal
- In office 1990–1996

Personal details
- Born: 6 June 1924 Karadagi, Bombay Presidency, British India
- Died: 10 October 2007 (aged 83) Bangalore, Karnataka, India
- Party: All India Progressive Janata Dal (2002–2007)
- Other political affiliations: Janata Dal (United) (1999–2002); Janata Dal (1993–1999); Samajwadi Janata Party (1990–1993); Janata Party (1977–1990); Indian National Congress (Organisation) (1972–1977); Radical Democratic Party (1940)
- Spouse: Gangamma
- Children: 4; including Basavaraj Bommai

Somappa Rayappa Bommai (6 June 1924 – 10 October 2007) was an Indian politician who was the 4th Chief Minister of Karnataka. He was also the Human Resource Development Minister in the United Front government from 1996 to 1998. He is widely remembered as the champion for the landmark judgment of the Supreme Court of India, S. R. Bommai v. Union of India.

His son Basavaraj Bommai became the Chief Minister of Karnataka in 2021 making them only the second father and son duo after H. D. Devegowda and H. D. Kumaraswamy to become the Chief Ministers of Karnataka

== Early life and political career ==
S. R. Bommai was born on 6 June 1924 in a Sadar Lingayat family at Karadagi village of Shiggaon taluk of the then undivided Dharwad District. He took part in the Quit India movement of 1942. He also played an active role in the unification (Ekikarana in Kannada) of Karnataka which had been spread among Mysore kingdom, Bombay Presidency, Hyderabad, and Madras Presidency, during the British rule.

A lawyer by profession, he was elected to the Karnataka Legislative assembly many times from the Hubballi rural constituency and was also a member of the Karnataka Legislative council from 1972 to 1978.

He along with Ramakrishna Hegde, J. H. Patel and H. D. Deve Gowda was instrumental in the Janata Party forming a government in Karnataka for the first time in 1983. He was given the portfolio of Industries in the Ramakrishna Hegde government. After Hegde quit on moral grounds, Bommai took charge as Chief Minister on 13 August 1988 and his government was dismissed by the then Governor, P. Venkatasubbaiah, on 21 April 1989 on the grounds that his government had lost its majority following large-scale defections engineered by several Janata Party leaders. Bommai had sought some time from the Governor to prove his majority on the floor of the Legislature and he was denied this. He challenged this order in the Supreme Court.

S. R. Bommai was the president of Karnataka state unit until the state unit got merged with Janata Dal in 1993 before 1994 Karnataka Assembly elections.

== S. R. Bommai v. Union of India case ==
S. R. Bommai v. Union of India was a landmark judgment of the Supreme Court of India, where the Court discussed at length, the provisions of Article 356 of the Constitution of India and related issues. The apex court spelt out restrictions on the centre's power to dismiss a state government under Article 356. This case had huge impact on Centre-State Relations. Instances of imposition of President's rule have reduced after this judgement.

Bommai was National president of the Janata Dal from 1990 to 1996. He was elected to the Rajya Sabha, two times in 1992 and 1998. In 1996, he became the Union minister for Human resource development in the United Front government and served with both the prime ministers H. D. Deve Gowda and I. K. Gujral. In 1999, after the Janata Dal split, he sided with the JD(U) faction and later formed the All India Progressive Janata Dal in 2002, as a platform for merger of different factions of Janata Dal. However, after large scale defections, the weakened party was finally merged with JD(U).

He died on 10 October 2007, aged 84. His one son, M.S. Bommai is an industrialist in Bengaluru, and the other Basavaraj Bommai inherited his political legacy and went on to become the Chief Minister of Karnataka on 28 July 2021.

Preceded by Ramakrishna Hegde	Chief Minister of Karnataka; 13 August 1988 – 21 April 1989	Succeeded by President's rule

Preceded by Atal Bihari Vajpayee (as Prime minister)	Human Resource Development Minister; 5 June 1996 – 19 March 1998	Succeeded by Murli Manohar Joshi
