= Chief Minister of Karnataka =

Leader of the executive branch of Government of Karnataka

- Karnāṭakada Mukhyamantri
- Emblem of Karnataka

- Flag of India

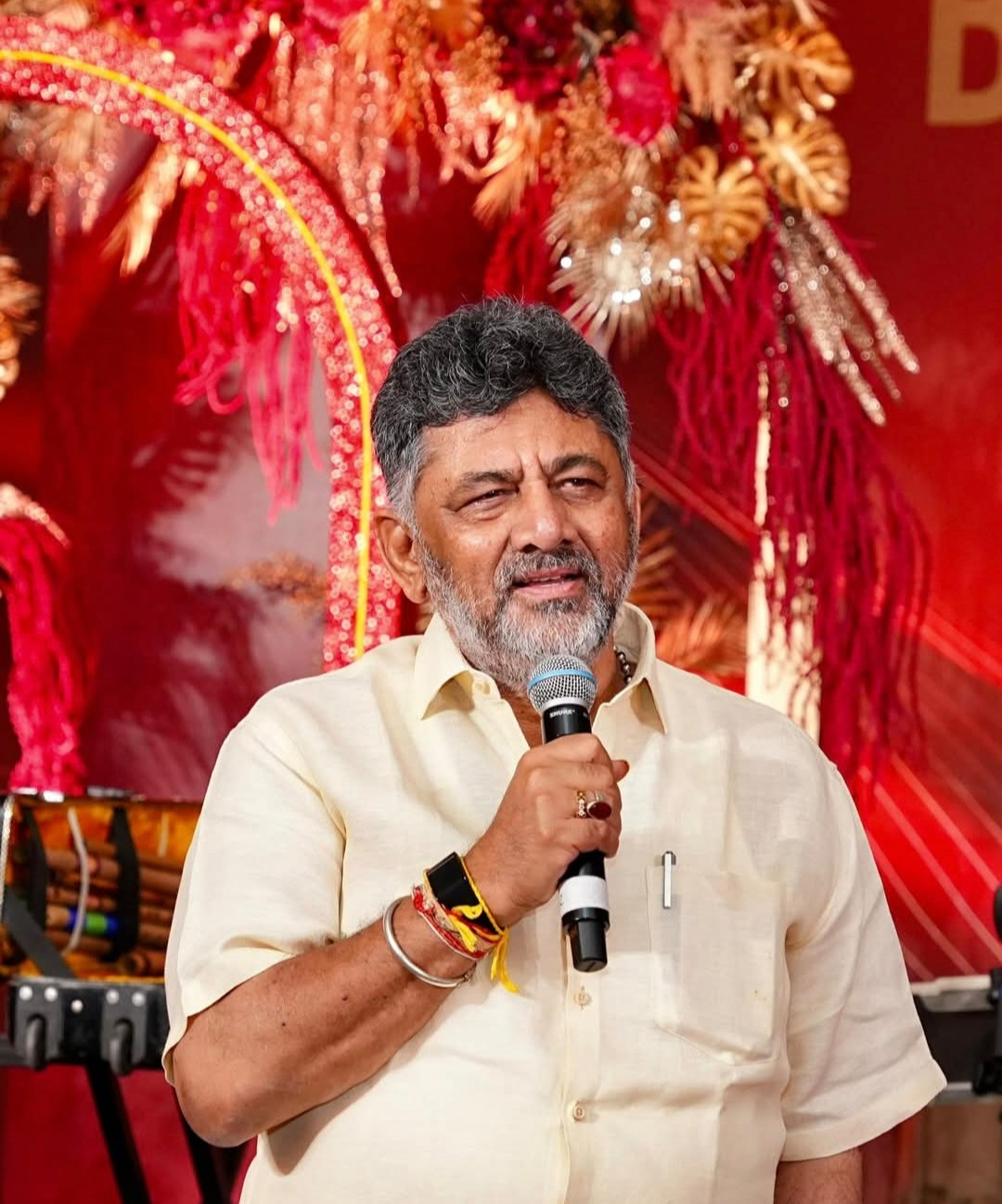
- Incumbent; D. K. Shivakumar since 3 June 2026
- Chief Minister's Office; Government of Karnataka
- Style: The Honourable
- Type: Leader of the Executive
- Status: Head of government
- Member of: State Cabinet; State Legislature
- Reports to: Governor of Karnataka; Karnataka Legislature
- Residence: Anugraha, Bangalore
- Seat: Vidhana Soudha, Bengaluru
- Nominator: MLAs of the majority party of alliance
- Appointer: Governor of Karnataka; by convention based on appointees ability to command confidence in the Karnataka Legislative Assembly
- Term length: At the confidence of the assembly; Chief minister's term is for 5 years and is subject to no term limits.
- Precursor: Dewan of Mysore
- Inaugural holder: K. Chengalaraya Reddy (as the chief minister of Mysore; before state's reorganization); S. Nijalingappa (as the chief minister of Mysore; after state's reorganization); D. Devaraj Urs (as the chief minister of Karnataka)
- Formation: 1 November 1956 (69 years ago)
- Deputy: Deputy Chief Minister of Karnataka
- Salary: ₹200,000 (US$2,100)/monthly; ₹2,400,000 (US$25,000)/annually
- Website: cm.karnataka.gov.in

The Chief Minister of Karnataka is the head of government of the Indian state of Karnataka. As per the Constitution of India, the governor is the state's de jure head, while the de facto executive authority rests with the chief minister. Following elections to the Karnataka Legislative Assembly, the state's governor usually invites the political party (or a coalition of political parties) with a majority of assembly seats to form the government in the state. The governor appoints the chief minister, whose council of ministers is collectively responsible to the assembly. Given that he/she has the confidence of the assembly, the chief minister's term is for five years, renewable, and is subject to no term limits. Usually, the chief minister also serves as leader of the house in the legislative assembly.

The office traces its lineage to the dewan of Mysuru, the chief minister of the princely Kingdom of Mysore under the British Raj. After Indian independence in 1947, this became the office of prime minister of Mysuru State, which was in turn redesignated chief minister when Mysuru became a constituent state of the newly declared Republic of India in 1950. The state, expanded along linguistic lines in 1956, was renamed Karnataka in 1973, and the office has been styled Chief Minister of Karnataka ever since. Since 1947, twenty-one people have held the position, an overwhelming majority of them from the Indian National Congress (INC), which has supplied twelve of the twenty-one officeholders and accounted for the bulk of the office's cumulative tenure. INC's dominance was broken only intermittently: by Ramakrishna Hegde of the Janata Party in 1983, the first chief minister unaffiliated with Congress or its breakaway factions; by two terms of Janata Dal-descended governments in the 1990s and 2000s, including the Janata Dal (Secular) premierships of Deve Gowda and HD Kumaraswamy; and, from 2007 onward, by the Bharatiya Janata Party (BJP), whose B. S. Yediyurappa became Karnataka's first BJP chief minister and, across four separate terms, the only person to hold the office that many times.

Tenures have varied widely in length and stability. Siddaramaiah holds the record for the longest single stint, at eight years and eighteen days across two terms, while Veerendra Patil had the longest gap between his two periods in office, at over eighteen years. The state has also seen recurring interruptions: six spells of President's rule, most recently from November 2007 to May 2008, during which the office fell vacant and administration passed to the governor. Two father–son pairs have held the post — Deve Gowda and Kumaraswamy of the JD(S), and S. R. Bommai and his son Basavaraj Bommai of the BJP — and two former chief ministers went on to higher national office: B. D. Jatti, chief minister from 1958 to 1962, later became India's fifth Vice President in 1974, while Deve Gowda became the eleventh Prime Minister in 1996. D. K. Shivakumar became the twenty-first and incumbent chief minister on 3 June 2026, succeeding Siddaramaiah.

== Predecessors ==
=== Prime ministers of Mysore State ===
The Princely state of Kingdom of Mysuru, which existed during the British Raj, was organised into Mysuru state after the Indian Independence in 1947.

| # | Portrait | Name | Constituency | Term (tenure length) | | | Assembly (election) | Party (Note: This column only names the chief minister's party. The state government he headed may have been a complex coalition of several parties and independents; these are not listed here.) |
|---|---|---|---|---|---|---|---|---|
| 1 | Portrait of K. Chengalaraya Reddy | K. Chengalaraya Reddy (1902 – 1976) | N/A | 25 October 1947 | 26 January 1950 | 2 years, 93 days | Not established yet | Indian National Congress |

=== Chief ministers of Mysore State ===
Following the adoption of the Constitution of India, the executive of the Mysore State was led by a chief minister.

| # | Portrait | Name | Constituency | Term (tenure length) | | | Assembly (election) | Party |
|---|---|---|---|---|---|---|---|---|
| 1 | Portrait of K. Chengalaraya Reddy | K. Chengalaraya Reddy (1902 – 1976) | N/A | 26 January 1950 | 30 March 1952 | 2 years, 64 days | Not established yet | Indian National Congress |
| 2 | Portrait of Kengal Hanumanthaiah | Kengal Hanumanthaiah (1908 – 1980) | Ramanagara | 30 March 1952 | 19 August 1956 | 4 years, 142 days | 1st (1952 election) | Indian National Congress |
| 3 | | Kadidal Manjappa (1908 – 1992) | Tirthahalli | 19 August 1956 | 31 October 1956 | 73 days | 1st (1952 election) | Indian National Congress |

== Chief ministers of Karnataka ==
On 1 November 1956, as per the States Reorganisation Act, which organised states along the linguistic lines, Mysuru State was expanded with the inclusion of the Kannada-speaking districts of Bombay, Hyderabad and Madras States, and the entirety of Coorg. On 1 November 1973, Mysuru State was renamed as Karnataka via the Mysuru State (Alteration of Name) Act.

Colour key

Indian National Congress (INC)
Bharatiya Janata Party (BJP)
Janata Party (JP)
Janata Dal (JD)
Janata Dal (Secular) (JD(S))
INC(O)
INC(R)
INC(I)
Office vacant / President's rule

| # | Portrait | Name | Constituency | Term | | | Assembly (election) | Party |
Chief Minister of Mysore (1956-1973) (Note: On 1 November 1956, the Indian states were reorganised along linguistic lines. The Mysore State was expanded with the addition of the Kannada-speaking districts of Bombay, Hyderabad, and Madras states, and the entirety of Coorg.)
| 1 | Portrait of S. Nijalingappa | S. Nijalingappa (1902 – 2000) | Molakalmuru | 31 October 1956 | 16 May 1958 | 1 year, 197 days | ...continued 1st (1952) | Indian National Congress |
| 1 | Portrait of S. Nijalingappa | S. Nijalingappa (1902 – 2000) | Molakalmuru | 31 October 1956 | 16 May 1958 | 1 year, 197 days | 2nd (1957) | Indian National Congress |
| 2 | Portrait of B. D. Jatti | B. D. Jatti (1912 – 2002) | Jamkhandi | 16 May 1958 | 14 March 1962 | 3 years, 302 days | 2nd (1957) | Indian National Congress |
| 3 | | S. R. Kanthi (1908 – 1969) | Hungund | 14 March 1962 | 21 June 1962 | 99 days | 3rd (1962) | Indian National Congress |
| (1) | Portrait of S. Nijalingappa | S. Nijalingappa (1902 – 2000) | Shiggaon | 21 June 1962 | 29 May 1968 | 5 years, 343 days | 3rd (1962) | Indian National Congress |
| (1) | Portrait of S. Nijalingappa | S. Nijalingappa (1902 – 2000) | Bagalkot | 21 June 1962 | 29 May 1968 | 5 years, 343 days | 4th (1967) | Indian National Congress |
| 4 | Portrait of Veerendra Patil | Veerendra Patil (1924 – 1997) | Chincholi | 29 May 1968 | 18 March 1971 | 2 years, 293 days | 4th (1967) | Indian National Congress (O) |
| – | | Vacant (Note: President's rule may be imposed when the "government in a state is not able to function as per the Constitution", which often happens because no party or coalition has a majority in the assembly. When President's_rule#Karnataka) (President's rule) | N/A | 18 March 1971 | 20 March 1972 | 1 year, 2 days | Dissolved | N/A |
| 5 | Portrait of D. Devaraj Urs | D. Devaraj Urs (Note: On 1 November 1973, Mysore State was renamed as Karnataka. Devaraj Urs, who was the chief minister of Mysore state since 20 March 1972, continued as chief minister of Karnataka post the renaming.) (1915 – 1982) | Hunasuru | 20 March 1972 | 31 October 1973 | 1 year, 225 days | 5th (1972) | Indian National Congress (R) |
Chief Minister of Karnataka (1973-present)
| 1 | | D. Devaraj Urs (1915 – 1982) | Hunasuru | 1 November 1973 | 31 December 1977 | 4 years, 60 days | ...continued 5th (1972) | Indian National Congress (I) |
| – | | Vacant (President's rule) | N/A | 31 December 1977 | 28 February 1978 | 59 days | Dissolved | N/A |
| (1) | Portrait of D. Devaraj Urs | D. Devaraj Urs (1915 – 1982) | Hunasuru | 28 February 1978 | 12 January 1980 | 1 year, 318 days | 6th (1978) | Indian National Congress (I) |
| 2 | | R. Gundu Rao (1937 – 1993) | Somwarpet | 12 January 1980 | 10 January 1983 | 2 years, 363 days | 6th (1978) | Indian National Congress (I) |
| 3 | Portrait of Ramakrishna Hegde | Ramakrishna Hegde (1926 – 2004) | Kanakapura | 10 January 1983 | 7 March 1985 (Note: According to Frontline, following the poor performance of the Janata Party in the 1984 Indian general election (it won only four out of the 28 seats), Hegde resigned because his party had lost its popular mandate. He headed a caretaker government till the next elections. In the 1985 Karnataka assembly election, the Janata Party came to power with a comfortable majority.") | 5 years, 216 days | 7th (1983) | Janata Party |
| 3 | Portrait of Ramakrishna Hegde | Ramakrishna Hegde (1926 – 2004) | Basavanagudi | 8 March 1985 | 13 August 1988 (Note: According to Frontline, Hegde resigned in February 1986 when the Karnataka High Court censured his government for the way it handled arrack bottling contracts. He withdrew his resignation after a couple of days, "following pressure from his party legislators".) | 5 years, 216 days | 8th (1985) | Janata Party |
| 4 | Portrait of S. R. Bommai | S. R. Bommai (1924 – 2007) | Hubli Rural | 13 August 1988 | 21 April 1989 | 251 days | 8th (1985) | Janata Party |
| – | | Vacant (President's rule) | N/A | 21 April 1989 | 30 November 1989 | 223 days | Dissolved | N/A |
| 5 | Portrait of Veerendra Patil | Veerendra Patil (1924 – 1997) | Chincholi | 30 November 1989 | 10 October 1990 | 314 days | 9th (1989) | Indian National Congress (I) |
| – | | Vacant (President's rule) | N/A | 10 October 1990 | 17 October 1990 | 7 days | 9th (1989) | N/A |
| 6 | | Sarekoppa Bangarappa (1933 – 2011) | Soraba | 17 October 1990 | 19 November 1992 | 2 years, 33 days | 9th (1989) | Indian National Congress (I) |
| 7 | Portrait of Veerappa Moily | Veerappa Moily (born 1940) | Karkala | 19 November 1992 | 11 December 1994 | 2 years, 22 days | 9th (1989) | Indian National Congress (I) |
| 8 | Portrait of H. D. Deve Gowda | H. D. Deve Gowda (born 1933) | Ramanagara | 11 December 1994 | 31 May 1996 | 1 year, 172 days | 10th (1994) | Janata Dal |
| 9 | | J. H. Patel (1930 – 2000) | Channagiri | 31 May 1996 | 11 October 1999 | 3 years, 133 days | 10th (1994) | Janata Dal |
| 10 | Portrait of S. M. Krishna | S. M. Krishna (1932 – 2024) | Maddur | 11 October 1999 | 28 May 2004 | 4 years, 230 days | 11th (1999) | Indian National Congress |
| 11 | Portrait of Dharam Singh | Dharam Singh (1936 – 2017) | Jevargi | 28 May 2004 | 3 February 2006 | 1 year, 251 days | 12th (2004) | Indian National Congress |
| 12 | Portrait of H. D. Kumaraswamy | H. D. Kumaraswamy (born 1959) | Ramanagara | 3 February 2006 | 8 October 2007 | 1 year, 247 days | 12th (2004) | Janata Dal (Secular) |
| – | | Vacant (President's rule) | N/A | 8 October 2007 | 12 November 2007 | 35 days | 12th (2004) | N/A |
| 13 | Portrait of B. S. Yediyurappa | B. S. Yediyurappa (Note: Yediyurappa is the only person to have served as chief minister on four separate occasions.) (born 1943) | Shikaripura | 12 November 2007 | 19 November 2007 | 7 days | 12th (2004) | Bharatiya Janata Party |
| – | | Vacant (President's rule) | N/A | 19 November 2007 | 29 May 2008 | 193 days | Dissolved | N/A |
| (13) | Portrait of B. S. Yediyurappa | B. S. Yediyurappa (born 1943) | Shikaripura | 30 May 2008 | 5 August 2011 | 3 years, 67 days | 13th (2008) | Bharatiya Janata Party |
| 14 | Portrait of Sadananda Gowda | Sadananda Gowda (born 1953) | MLC | 5 August 2011 | 12 July 2012 | 342 days | 13th (2008) | Bharatiya Janata Party |
| 15 | Portrait of Jagadish Shettar | Jagadish Shettar (born 1955) | Hubli-Dharwad Central | 12 July 2012 | 13 May 2013 | 305 days | 13th (2008) | Bharatiya Janata Party |
| 16 | Portrait of Siddaramaiah | Siddaramaiah (Note: Siddaramaiah holds the record for the longest combined tenure as chief minister, at eight years and eighteen days across his two terms.) (born 1947) | Varuna | 13 May 2013 | 17 May 2018 | 5 years, 4 days | 14th (2013) | Indian National Congress |
| (13) | Portrait of B. S. Yediyurappa | B. S. Yediyurappa (born 1943) | Shikaripura | 17 May 2018 | 23 May 2018 | 6 days | 15th (2018) | Bharatiya Janata Party |
| (12) | Portrait of H. D. Kumaraswamy | H. D. Kumaraswamy (born 1959) | Channapatna | 23 May 2018 | 26 July 2019 | 1 year, 64 days | 15th (2018) | Janata Dal (Secular) |
| (13) | Portrait of B. S. Yediyurappa | B. S. Yediyurappa (born 1943) | Shikaripura | 26 July 2019 | 28 July 2021 | 2 years, 2 days | 15th (2018) | Bharatiya Janata Party |
| 17 | Portrait of Basavaraj Bommai | Basavaraj Bommai (born 1960) | Shiggaon | 28 July 2021 | 20 May 2023 | 1 year, 296 days | 15th (2018) | Bharatiya Janata Party |
| (16) | Portrait of Siddaramaiah | Siddaramaiah (born 1947) | Varuna | 20 May 2023 | 3 June 2026 | 3 years, 14 days | 16th (2023) | Indian National Congress |
| 18 | Portrait of D. K. Shivakumar | D. K. Shivakumar (born 1962) | Kanakapura | 3 June 2026 | Incumbent | 123 days | 16th (2023) | Indian National Congress |

== Statistics ==
Time held in office by party (as of 12 September 2026)
1. Indian National Congress (64.0%)
2. Bharatiya Janata Party (12.6%)
3. Janata Party (8.99%)
4. Janata Dal (6.92%)
5. Janata Dal (Secular) (4.08%)
6. President's Rule (3.47%)

| # | Name | Party | Length of term | |
| # | Name | Party | Longest tenure | Total tenure |
|---|---|---|---|---|
| 1 | Siddaramaiah | INC | 5 years, 4 days | 8 years, 18 days |
| 2 | D. Devaraj Urs | INC / INC(R) | 5 years, 286 days | 7 years, 239 days |
| 3 | S. Nijalingappa | INC | 5 years, 343 days | 7 years, 175 days |
| 4 | Ramakrishna Hegde | JP | 5 years, 216 days | 5 years, 216 days |
| 5 | B. S. Yediyurappa | BJP | 3 years, 67 days | 5 years, 82 days |
| 6 | S. M. Krishna | INC | 4 years, 230 days | 4 years, 230 days |
| 7 | B. D. Jatti | INC | 3 years, 302 days | 3 years, 302 days |
| 8 | Veerendra Patil | INC / INC(O) | 2 years, 293 days | 3 years, 242 days |
| 9 | J. H. Patel | JD | 3 years, 133 days | 3 years, 133 days |
| 10 | R. Gundu Rao | INC | 2 years, 363 days | 2 years, 363 days |
| 11 | H. D. Kumaraswamy | JD(S) | 1 year, 247 days | 2 years, 311 days |
| 12 | Sarekoppa Bangarappa | INC | 2 years, 33 days | 2 years, 33 days |
| 13 | Veerappa Moily | INC | 2 years, 22 days | 2 years, 22 days |
| 14 | Basavaraj Bommai | BJP | 1 year, 296 days | 1 year, 296 days |
| 15 | Dharam Singh | INC | 1 year, 251 days | 1 year, 251 days |
| 16 | H. D. Deve Gowda | JD | 1 year, 172 days | 1 year, 172 days |
| 17 | Sadananda Gowda | BJP | 342 days | 342 days |
| 18 | Jagadish Shettar | BJP | 305 days | 305 days |
| 19 | S. R. Bommai | JP | 251 days | 251 days |
| 20 | D. K. Shivakumar* | INC | 123 days | 123 days |
| 21 | S. R. Kanthi | INC | 99 days | 99 days |
| — | President's Rule | — | 1 year, 1 day | 2 years, 121 days |

By political party

Span by political party (as of 12 September 2026)
| Political party | Number of chief ministers | Total years of holding CMO |
|---|---|---|
| Indian National Congress including INC(I) / INC(O) / INC(R) | 12 | 44 years, 258 days |
| Bharatiya Janata Party | 4 | 8 years, 296 days |
| Janata Party | 2 | 6 years, 103 days |
| Janata Dal | 2 | 4 years, 305 days |
| Janata Dal (Secular) | 1 | 2 years, 311 days |
| President's Rule | 6 | 2 years, 155 days |

== Parties by total duration (in years) of holding Chief Minister's Office ==
- INC
- BJP
- JD
- JP
- JD(S)

== See also ==
- Dewan of Mysore
- List of Diwans of Mysore
- List of deputy chief ministers of Karnataka
