= Hubli Rural Assembly constituency =

Former constituency in Karnataka State, India

Coordinates: 15.35°N 75.13°E

Hubli Rural
- Former constituency for the Karnataka Legislative Assembly

Constituency details
- Country: India
- Region: South India
- State: Karnataka
- District: Dharwad
- Lok Sabha constituency: Dharwad
- Established: 1972
- Abolished: 2008
- Reservation: None

Hubli Rural Assembly constituency was one of the 224 Vidhan Sabha constituencies in Karnataka Legislative Assembly that used to come under Dharwad district and it came into existence in 1972 and was abolished after the 2008 delimitation exercise. This seat was once held by 2 Chief Ministers S. R. Bommai and Jagadish Shettar and former Chief Minister Basavaraj Bommai contested in this constituency once in 1994 but lost to Jagadish Shettar.

== Members of the Legislative Assembly ==
Election	Member	Party
1957	P. M. Ramangouda	Indian National Congress
1962	P. M. Ramangouda	Indian National Congress
1967	P. M. Ramangouda	Indian National Congress
1972	G. Rangaswamy Sandra	Indian National Congress
1978	S. R. Bommai	Janata Party
1983	S. R. Bommai	Janata Party
1985	S. R. Bommai	Janata Party
1989	G. R. Sandra	Indian National Congress
1994	Jagadish Shettar	Bharatiya Janata Party
1999	Jagadish Shettar	Bharatiya Janata Party
2004	Jagadish Shettar	Bharatiya Janata Party

== Election results ==
=== Assembly Election 2004 ===
2004 Karnataka Legislative Assembly election : Hubli Rural
Party	Candidate	Votes	%	±%
BJP	Jagadish Shettar	58,501	43.66	▼9.84
INC	Anil Kumar Patil	31,965	23.86	▼8.09
JD(S)	Prafulchandra Rayanagoudar	29,869	22.29	▲10.15
KNP	Vijay Sankeshwar	9,479	7.07	New
JP	Husensab H. Morab	966	0.72	New
Independent	Venkatesh Savadatti	948	0.71	New
Margin of victory		26,536	19.81	▼1.74
Turnout		133,991	57.97	▼1.32
Total valid votes		133,979		
Registered electors		231,157		▲12.94
BJP hold		Swing	▼9.84	

=== Assembly Election 1999 ===
1999 Karnataka Legislative Assembly election : Hubli Rural
Party	Candidate	Votes	%	±%
BJP	Jagadish Shettar	62,691	53.50	▲13.64
INC	Gopinath Rangaswamy Sandra	37,437	31.95	▲14.77
JD(S)	Hirekerur Lakshman Hanamantappa	14,222	12.14	New
Independent	V. B. Hombal	996	0.85	New
Independent	Kuppe Abdul Razark Diwansab	957	0.82	New
Margin of victory		25,254	21.55	▲6.66
Turnout		121,351	59.29	▼2.84
Total valid votes		117,183		
Rejected ballots		4,033	3.32	▲1.13
Registered electors		204,675		▲15.91
BJP hold		Swing	▲13.64	

=== Assembly Election 1994 ===
1994 Karnataka Legislative Assembly election : Hubli Rural
Party	Candidate	Votes	%	±%
BJP	Jagadish Shettar	42,768	39.86	New
JD	Basavaraj Bommai	26,794	24.97	▼19.38
INC	Raja. N. Desai	18,433	17.18	▼30.48
Independent	Prafulchandra Rayangoudar	9,188	8.56	New
INC	Umashree	2,522	2.35	New
Independent	K. S. Acharya	1,568	1.46	New
Kranti Sabha	Pujar Mahadevappa Somappa	1,192	1.11	New
Independent	Ramappa Dyavappa Talawar	797	0.74	New
Margin of victory		15,974	14.89	▲11.59
Turnout		109,712	62.13	▲0.43
Total valid votes		107,304		
Rejected ballots		2,405	2.19	▼1.55
Registered electors		176,574		▲9.32
BJP gain from INC		Swing	▼7.80	

=== Assembly Election 1989 ===
1989 Karnataka Legislative Assembly election : Hubli Rural
Party	Candidate	Votes	%	±%
INC	G. R. Sandra	45,718	47.66	▲7.18
JD	Bommai Somappa Rayappa	42,548	44.35	New
Independent	P. H. Pawar	3,746	3.91	New
Independent	Yedravi. F. B	786	0.82	New
Independent	Bijapur. G. F	662	0.69	New
JP	Hiremath. S. S	609	0.63	New
Margin of victory		3,170	3.30	▲1.34
Turnout		99,651	61.70	▼3.60
Total valid votes		95,927		
Rejected ballots		3,724	3.74	▲2.27
Registered electors		161,516		▲37.11
INC gain from JP		Swing	▲5.21	

=== Assembly Election 1985 ===
1985 Karnataka Legislative Assembly election : Hubli Rural
Party	Candidate	Votes	%	±%
JP	S. R. Bommai	32,175	42.45	▼6.93
INC	Gopinath Rangaswamy Sandra	30,687	40.48	▲5.62
Independent	Patil Panduranga Venkanagoudra	7,469	9.85	New
BJP	Hadagali Shrinivas Nagesh	4,751	6.27	▼8.38
Margin of victory		1,488	1.96	▼12.56
Turnout		76,928	65.30	▼1.39
Total valid votes		75,801		
Rejected ballots		1,127	1.47	▼1.58
Registered electors		117,800		▲18.86
JP hold		Swing	▼6.93	

=== Assembly Election 1983 ===
1983 Karnataka Legislative Assembly election : Hubli Rural
Party	Candidate	Votes	%	±%
JP	S. R. Bommai	31,644	49.38	▼3.97
INC	Wali Rachappa Gangappa	22,341	34.86	▲27.87
BJP	Shindhe Hanamantappa Nagappa	9,388	14.65	New
Margin of victory		9,303	14.52	▲0.02
Turnout		66,093	66.69	▼6.55
Total valid votes		64,079		
Rejected ballots		2,014	3.05	▲0.54
Registered electors		99,106		▲18.82
JP hold		Swing	▼3.97	

=== Assembly Election 1978 ===
1978 Karnataka Legislative Assembly election : Hubli Rural
Party	Candidate	Votes	%	±%
JP	S. R. Bommai	31,771	53.35	New
INC(I)	Kittur. F. M	23,137	38.85	New
INC	Gopinath Rangaswamy Sandra	4,165	6.99	▼53.06
Independent	C. M. Devendranaik	482	0.81	New
Margin of victory		8,634	14.50	▼22.79
Turnout		61,088	73.24	▲4.10
Total valid votes		59,555		
Rejected ballots		1,533	2.51	▲2.51
Registered electors		83,410		▲20.50
JP gain from INC		Swing	▼6.70	

=== Assembly Election 1972 ===
1972 Mysore State Legislative Assembly election : Hubli Rural
Party	Candidate	Votes	%	±%
INC	G. Rangaswamy Sandra	27,745	60.05	▼4.22
INC(O)	Wali Rachappa Gangappa	10,515	22.76	New
ABJS	K. B. Gadigeppa	7,946	17.20	▼7.64
Margin of victory		17,230	37.29	▼2.14
Turnout		47,861	69.14	▲7.91
Total valid votes		46,206		
Registered electors		69,221		▲13.78
INC hold		Swing	▼4.22	

=== Assembly Election 1967 ===
1967 Mysore State Legislative Assembly election : Hubli Rural
Party	Candidate	Votes	%	±%
INC	P. M. Ramangouda	22,540	64.27	▼10.55
ABJS	K. C. Shiddappa	8,713	24.84	New
Independent	D. M. Irappa	1,291	3.68	New
Independent	C. M. Devendranaik	1,163	3.32	New
PSP	N. N. Kallannawar	965	2.75	New
Independent	K. M. Narayan	399	1.14	New
Margin of victory		13,827	39.43	▼21.01
Turnout		37,255	61.23	▲1.70
Total valid votes		35,071		
Registered electors		60,840		▲8.63
INC hold		Swing	▼10.55	

=== Assembly Election 1962 ===
1962 Mysore State Legislative Assembly election : Hubli
Party	Candidate	Votes	%	±%
INC	P. M. Ramangouda	23,356	74.82	▲5.86
Independent	Tadasadmath Shivalingayya Madevayya	4,489	14.38	New
ABJS	Talawai Kallappa Fakirappa	3,371	10.80	New
Margin of victory		18,867	60.44	▲22.52
Turnout		33,341	59.53	▼1.19
Total valid votes		31,216		
Registered electors		56,006		▲12.44
INC hold		Swing	▲5.86	

=== Assembly Election 1957 ===
1957 Mysore State Legislative Assembly election : Hubli
Party	Candidate	Votes	%	±%
INC	P. M. Ramangouda	20,858	68.96	New
Independent	Kabli Anddaneppa Shiddappa	9,388	31.04	New
Margin of victory		11,470	37.92	
Turnout		30,246	60.72	
Total valid votes		30,246		
Registered electors		49,809		
INC win (new seat)				

== See also ==
- List of constituencies of the Karnataka Legislative Assembly
- Dharwad district
