= Channagiri Assembly constituency =

Legislative Assembly constituency in Karnataka State, India

Coordinates: 14.02°N 75.92°E

Channagiri
- Constituency No. 109 for the Karnataka Legislative Assembly

Constituency details
- Country: India
- Region: South India
- State: Karnataka
- District: Davanagere
- Lok Sabha constituency: Davangere
- Established: 1951
- Total electors: 199,517
- Reservation: None

Member of Legislative Assembly
- 16th Karnataka Legislative Assembly
- Incumbent Basavaraju V. Shivaganga
- Party: Indian National Congress
- Elected year: 2023
- Preceded by: K. Madal Virupakshappa

Channagiri Assembly constituency is one of the 224 Legislative Assembly constituencies of Karnataka in India.

It is part of Davanagere district. Basavaraju V. Shivaganga is the current MLA from Channagiri.

== Members of the Legislative Assembly ==
Election	Member	Party
1952	L. Siddappa	Kisan Mazdoor Praja Party
1957	Kundur Rudrappa	Indian National Congress
1962	Kundur Rudrappa	Indian National Congress
1967	N. G. Halappa	Sanghata Socialist Party
1972	N. G. Halappa	Indian National Congress
1978	J. H. Patel	Janata Party
1983	J. H. Patel	Janata Party
1985	J. H. Patel	Janata Party
1989	N. G. Halappa	Indian National Congress
1994	J. H. Patel	Janata Dal
1999	Vadnal Rajanna	Independent politician
2004	Mahima J. Patel	Janata Dal
2008	K. Madalu Virupakshappa	Bharatiya Janata Party
2013	Vadnal Rajanna	Indian National Congress
2018	K. Madalu Virupakshappa	Bharatiya Janata Party
2023	Basavaraju V. Shivaganga	Indian National Congress

== Election results ==
=== Assembly Election 2023 ===
2023 Karnataka Legislative Assembly election : Channagiri
Party	Candidate	Votes	%	±%
INC	Basavaraju V. Shivaganga	78,263	47.03%	▲16.66
Independent	Madal Mallikarjuna	61,828	37.16%	New
BJP	H. S. Shivakumar	21,467	12.90%	▼33.78
JD(S)	Tejaswi. V. Patel	1,216	0.73%	▼17.68
UPP	Chandrashekhara. Channagiri	1,017	0.61%	New
NOTA	None of the above	555	0.33%	▼0.27
Margin of victory		16,435	9.88%	▼6.43
Turnout		166,544	83.47%	▲2.87
Total valid votes		166,402		
Registered electors		199,517		▲1.66
INC gain from BJP		Swing	▲0.35	

=== Assembly Election 2018 ===
2018 Karnataka Legislative Assembly election : Channagiri
Party	Candidate	Votes	%	±%
BJP	K. Madalu Virupakshappa	73,794	46.68%	▲43.64
INC	Vadnal Rajanna	48,014	30.37%	▼5.41
JD(S)	D. Ramesha	29,106	18.41%	▼0.97
JD(U)	Mahima J. Patel	3,954	2.50%	New
NOTA	None of the above	946	0.60%	New
Margin of victory		25,780	16.31%	▲15.12
Turnout		158,191	80.60%	▼1.02
Total valid votes		158,094		
Registered electors		196,265		▲11.61
BJP gain from INC		Swing	▲10.90	

=== Assembly Election 2013 ===
2013 Karnataka Legislative Assembly election : Channagiri
Party	Candidate	Votes	%	±%
INC	Vadnal Rajanna	53,355	35.78%	▲1.86
KJP	K. Madalu Virupakshappa	51,582	34.59%	New
JD(S)	Hodigere Ramesh	28,900	19.38%	▲0.45
BJP	H. S. Shivakumar	4,526	3.04%	▼31.76
BSRCP	Ameer Ahmed Kogaluru	1,054	0.71%	New
Margin of victory		1,773	1.19%	▲0.32
Turnout		143,530	81.62%	▲8.34
Total valid votes		149,119		
Registered electors		175,842		▲13.36
INC gain from BJP		Swing	▲0.98	

=== Assembly Election 2008 ===
2008 Karnataka Legislative Assembly election : Channagiri
Party	Candidate	Votes	%	±%
BJP	K. Madalu Virupakshappa	39,526	34.80%	▲11.95
INC	Vadnal Rajanna	38,533	33.92%	▲3.44
JD(S)	Hodigere Ramesh	21,499	18.93%	▼21.68
Swarna Yuga Party	Mahima J. Patel	9,519	8.38%	New
Independent	A. C. S. Cyclist Babu	1,524	1.34%	New
BSP	K. G. Purushothama Naik	1,372	1.21%	New
Independent	Durugappa	965	0.85%	New
Margin of victory		993	0.87%	▼9.26
Turnout		113,679	73.28%	▲3.00
Total valid votes		113,596		
Registered electors		155,121		▲3.25
BJP gain from JD(S)		Swing	▼5.81	

=== Assembly Election 2004 ===
2004 Karnataka Legislative Assembly election : Channagiri
Party	Candidate	Votes	%	±%
JD(S)	Mahima J. Patel	42,837	40.61%	▲35.48
INC	Vadnal Rajanna	32,154	30.48%	▲7.81
BJP	Veerupakshappa. K. M	24,105	22.85%	New
Independent	Bhoja Raj. N. P	1,880	1.78%	New
Kannada Nadu Party	Tejesh. G. S	1,381	1.31%	New
Independent	Benkikere Madanna	1,025	0.97%	New
JP	Devendrappa. M. N	1,006	0.95%	New
Independent	Jayadev. T. S	674	0.64%	New
Margin of victory		10,683	10.13%	▼16.93
Turnout		105,581	70.28%	▼6.44
Total valid votes		105,487		
Registered electors		150,239		▲9.44
JD(S) gain from Independent		Swing	▼9.12	

=== Assembly Election 1999 ===
1999 Karnataka Legislative Assembly election : Channagiri
Party	Candidate	Votes	%	±%
Independent	Vadnal Rajanna	48,778	49.73%	New
INC	Mohibulla Khan	22,239	22.67%	▲2.24
JD(U)	J. H. Patel	18,791	19.16%	New
JD(S)	H. Ramachandra Murthy	5,035	5.13%	New
Independent	K. R. Vasudevappa	1,633	1.66%	New
Independent	K. H. Manjappa	1,179	1.20%	New
Margin of victory		26,539	27.06%	▲6.54
Turnout		105,328	76.72%	▲2.79
Total valid votes		98,084		
Rejected ballots		7,033	6.68%	▲4.62
Registered electors		137,285		▲6.49
Independent gain from JD		Swing	▲8.78	

=== Assembly Election 1994 ===
1994 Karnataka Legislative Assembly election : Channagiri
Party	Candidate	Votes	%	±%
JD	J. H. Patel	38,178	40.95%	▲4.93
INC	N. G. Halappa	19,047	20.43%	▼33.42
BJP	Vadnal Rajanna	18,703	20.06%	New
INC	C. H. Jagadish	15,687	16.83%	New
Margin of victory		19,131	20.52%	▲2.68
Turnout		95,308	73.93%	▼2.07
Total valid votes		93,222		
Rejected ballots		1,964	2.06%	▼2.55
Registered electors		128,918		▲6.68
JD gain from INC		Swing	▼12.90	

=== Assembly Election 1989 ===
1989 Karnataka Legislative Assembly election : Channagiri
Party	Candidate	Votes	%	±%
INC	N. G. Halappa	47,179	53.85%	▲8.27
JD	J. H. Patel	31,553	36.02%	New
JP	H. Ramachandra Murthy	8,024	9.16%	New
Margin of victory		15,626	17.84%	▲13.63
Turnout		91,842	76.00%	▼1.20
Total valid votes		87,608		
Rejected ballots		4,234	4.61%	▲3.00
Registered electors		120,845		▲29.82
INC gain from JP		Swing	▲4.06	

=== Assembly Election 1985 ===
1985 Karnataka Legislative Assembly election : Channagiri
Party	Candidate	Votes	%	±%
JP	J. H. Patel	35,204	49.79%	▼5.30
INC	N. G. Halappa	32,224	45.58%	▲0.67
Independent	T. Siddaramappoa	1,414	2.00%	New
Independent	B. S. Nagaraj	937	1.33%	New
Independent	K. Babajan	815	1.15%	New
Margin of victory		2,980	4.21%	▼5.96
Turnout		71,859	77.20%	▲5.64
Total valid votes		70,701		
Rejected ballots		1,158	1.61%	▼0.50
Registered electors		93,083		▲3.89
JP hold		Swing	▼5.30	

=== Assembly Election 1983 ===
1983 Karnataka Legislative Assembly election : Channagiri
Party	Candidate	Votes	%	±%
JP	J. H. Patel	34,571	55.09%	▲6.13
INC	N. G. Halappa	28,188	44.91%	▲27.79
Margin of victory		6,383	10.17%	▼6.68
Turnout		64,113	71.56%	▼7.94
Total valid votes		62,759		
Rejected ballots		1,354	2.11%	▼0.61
Registered electors		89,596		▲12.22
JP hold		Swing	▲6.13	

=== Assembly Election 1978 ===
1978 Karnataka Legislative Assembly election : Channagiri
Party	Candidate	Votes	%	±%
JP	J. H. Patel	30,227	48.96%	New
INC(I)	Abdul Hameed Khan	19,826	32.11%	New
INC	N. G. Halappa	10,570	17.12%	▼37.34
Independent	Ummar Khan	1,120	1.81%	New
Margin of victory		10,401	16.85%	▼0.07
Turnout		63,471	79.50%	▲17.88
Total valid votes		61,743		
Rejected ballots		1,728	2.72%	▲2.72
Registered electors		79,842		▼3.71
JP gain from INC		Swing	▼5.50	

=== Assembly Election 1972 ===
1972 Mysore State Legislative Assembly election : Channagiri
Party	Candidate	Votes	%	±%
INC	N. G. Halappa	27,097	54.46%	▲17.14
Independent	D. M. Raghavappa	18,677	37.54%	New
INC(O)	K. Thippanna	3,979	8.00%	New
Margin of victory		8,420	16.92%	▼8.44
Turnout		51,093	61.62%	▼8.53
Total valid votes		49,753		
Registered electors		82,916		▲26.78
INC gain from SSP		Swing	▼8.22	

=== Assembly Election 1967 ===
1967 Mysore State Legislative Assembly election : Channagiri
Party	Candidate	Votes	%	±%
SSP	N. G. Halappa	27,077	62.68%	New
INC	K. Rudrappa	16,122	37.32%	▼21.05
Margin of victory		10,955	25.36%	▲5.34
Turnout		45,878	70.15%	▲4.40
Total valid votes		43,199		
Registered electors		65,400		▲9.12
SSP gain from INC		Swing	▲4.31	

=== Assembly Election 1962 ===
1962 Mysore State Legislative Assembly election : Channagiri
Party	Candidate	Votes	%	±%
INC	Kundur Rudrappa	21,368	58.37%	New
Socialist Party (India)	J. H. Patel	14,041	38.36%	New
ABJS	S. P. Seetharamaiah	1,196	3.27%	New
Margin of victory		7,327	20.02%	
Turnout		39,409	65.75%	
Total valid votes		36,605		
Registered electors		59,935		
INC hold		Swing		

=== Assembly Election 1957 ===
1957 Mysore State Legislative Assembly election : Channagiri
Party	Candidate	Votes	%	±%
INC	Kundur Rudrappa	Unopposed		
Registered electors		49,062		▲14.12
INC win (new seat)				

=== Assembly Election 1952 ===
1952 Mysore State Legislative Assembly election : Channagiri
Party	Candidate	Votes	%	±%
KMPP	L. Siddappa	17,297	51.29%	New
INC	Kundur Rudrappa	16,430	48.71%	New
Margin of victory		867	2.57%	
Turnout		33,727	78.45%	
Total valid votes		33,727		
Registered electors		42,991		
KMPP win (new seat)				

== See also ==
- List of constituencies of the Karnataka Legislative Assembly
- Davanagere district
