= Bangalore Rural Lok Sabha constituency =

Lok Sabha Constituency in Karnataka

Coordinates: 13.3°N 77.6°E

Bangalore Rural
- Lok Sabha constituency
- Bengaluru Rural - Kanakapura - Ramanagara Lok Sabha Constituency Map

Constituency details
- Country: India
- Region: South India
- State: Karnataka
- Assembly constituencies: Kunigal; Rajarajeshwarinagar; Bangalore South; Anekal; Magadi; Ramanagara; Kanakapura; Channapatna
- Established: 2008
- Total electors: 2,190,397
- Reservation: None

Member of Parliament
- 18th Lok Sabha
- Incumbent C. N. Manjunath
- Party: Bharatiya Janata Party
- Elected year: 2024

Bangalore Rural Lok Sabha constituency (sometimes called Ramanagara) is one of the 28 Lok Sabha (lower house of the Indian parliament) constituencies in the South Indian state of Karnataka. This constituency was created in 2008 following the delimitation of parliamentary constituencies.

It comprises eight assembly segments of which seven are derived from the former Kanakapura Lok Sabha constituency (abolished in 2008). It first held elections in 2009 and its first member of parliament (MP) was H. D. Kumaraswamy of the Janata Dal (Secular) party. Kumaraswamy resigned his seat in 2013. The by election that followed was won by D. K. Suresh of the Indian National Congress (INC). As of the latest election in 2024, Dr. C. N. Manjunath of the Bharatiya Janata Party represents this constituency.

== History ==
Kanakapura Lok Sabha constituency was a former Lok Sabha constituency in Karnataka state in southern India. It included eight Assembly constituencies, namely Kanakapura, Ramanagara, Channapatna, Magadi, Sathanur, Uttarahalli, Malavalli and Anekal. Out of them, Kanakapura, Ramanagaram, Channapatna, Magadi and Anekal assembly segments were retained in the Bangalore Rural constituency created in 2008 as part of delimitation in Karnataka. Sathanur was merged between Kanakapura, Ramanagaram and Channapatna constituencies. Malavalli became a part of Mandya constituency and Uttarahalli was reformed and Uttarahalli Circle was merged with new Bangalore South Assembly Constituency.

The new Assembly Constituencies Bangalore South, Anekal, and Rajarajeshwarinagar became a part of Bangalore Rural along with Kunigal Assembly Constituency from Tumkur district

== Assembly segments ==
Bangalore Rural Lok Sabha constituency presently comprises the following eight Legislative Assembly segments:

No	Name	District	Member	Party	Party Leading (in 2024)
131	Kunigal	Tumkur	H. D. Ranganath	INC	BJP
154	Rajarajeshwarinagar	Bangalore Urban	Munirathna	BJP	BJP
176	Bangalore South	Bangalore Urban	M. Krishnappa	BJP	BJP
177	Anekal (SC)	Bangalore Urban	B. Shivanna	INC	BJP
182	Magadi	Bangalore South	H. C. Balakrishna	INC	BJP
183	Ramanagara	Bangalore South	H. A. Iqbal Hussain	INC	INC
184	Kanakapura	Bangalore South	D. K. Shivakumar	INC	INC
185	Channapatna	Bangalore South	C. P. Yogeshwara	INC	BJP

== Members of Parliament ==
Year	Name	Party
Before 2008: See Kanakapura
2009	H. D. Kumaraswamy	Janata Dal (Secular)
2013^	D. K. Suresh	Indian National Congress
2014	D. K. Suresh	Indian National Congress
2019	D. K. Suresh	Indian National Congress
2024	C. N. Manjunath	Bharatiya Janata Party

^ by poll

== Election results ==
=== General election 2024 ===
2024 Indian general election: Bangalore Rural
Party	Candidate	Votes	%	±%
BJP	Dr. C. N. Manjunath	1,079,002	56.21	▲14.81
INC	D. K. Suresh	8,09,355	42.16	▼11.99
NOTA	None of the Above	10,649	0.55	▼0.22
Majority		2,69,647	14.05	▲1.30
Turnout		19,20,679	68.52	▲3.54
BJP gain from INC		Swing		

=== 2019 ===
2019 Indian general election: Bangalore Rural
Party	Candidate	Votes	%	±%
INC	D. K. Suresh	878,258	54.15	+9.30
BJP	Ashwath Narayan Gowda	671,388	41.40	+12.45
BSP	Dr. Chinappa Y. Chikkahagade	19,972	1.23	+0.43
NOTA	None of the Above	12,454	0.77	+0.09
Margin of victory		2,06,870	12.75	−3.15
Turnout		16,22,824	64.98	−1.46
INC hold		Swing	+9.30	

=== General election 2014 ===
2014 Indian general election: Bangalore Rural
Party	Candidate	Votes	%	±%
INC	D. K. Suresh	652,723	44.85	−10.07
BJP	Muniraju Gowda P.	4,21,243	28.95	N/A
JD(S)	R. Prabhakara Reddy	3,17,870	21.84	−20.08
AAP	Ravi Krishna Reddy	17,195	1.18	N/A
BSP	C. Thopaiah	11,594	0.80	N/A
NOTA	None of the above	9,871	0.68	N/A
Margin of victory		2,31,480	15.90	+2.90
Turnout		14,55,610	66.45	+14.41
INC hold		Swing		

=== By election 2013 ===
Bye-election, 2013: Bangalore Rural
Party	Candidate	Votes	%	±%
INC	D. K. Suresh	578,608	54.92	+37.44
JD(S)	Anitha Kumaraswamy	4,41,601	41.92	−2.81
RPI(A)	Kunigal Shivanna	9,399	0.89	N/A
IND.	S. Siddaramaiah (Heggade)	6,057	0.58	N/A
JD(U)	J. T. Prakash	3,245	0.31	−0.15
Margin of victory		1,37,007	13.00	+1.19
Turnout		10,53,745	52.04	−5.88
INC gain from JD(S)		Swing		

=== General election 2009 ===
2009 Indian general election: Bangalore Rural
Party	Candidate	Votes	%	±%
JD(S)	H. D. Kumaraswamy	493,302	44.73	
BJP	C. P. Yogeeshwara	3,63,027	32.92	
INC	Tejashwini Gowda	1,92,822	17.48	
BSP	Mohamed Hafeez Ullah	12,909	1.17	
IND.	T. M. Manchegowda	10,739	0.97	
Margin of victory		1,30,275	11.81	
Turnout		11,02,833	57.92	
JD(S) win (new seat)				

== See also ==
- Ramanagaram district
- List of constituencies of the Lok Sabha
