= Electoral history of H. D. Deve Gowda =

This is the electoral history of H. D. Deve Gowda. Deve Gowda served as the prime minister of India from June 1996 to April 1997. He was also the chief minister of Karnataka between 1994 and 1996.

== Summary ==
=== Karnataka Legislative Assembly elections ===
| Year | Constituency | Party | Votes | Result | Opposition Candidate | Opposition Party | Opposition votes | Ref |
|---|---|---|---|---|---|---|---|---|
| 1962 | Holenarasipur | Independent | 12,622 | Won | H. D. Doddegowda | INC | 7,338 | |
| 1967 | Holenarasipur | Independent | 20,594 | Won | H. D. Doddegowda | INC | 12,191 | |
| 1972 | Holenarasipur | INC(O) | 26,639 | Won | K. Kumaraswamy | INC | 20,475 | |
| 1978 | Holenarasipur | JP | 33,992 | Won | K. Kumaraswamy | INC | 28,472 | |
| 1983 | Holenarasipur | JP | 37,239 | Won | K. Kumaraswamy | INC | 28,158 | |
| 1985 | Holenarasipur | JP | 41,230 | Won | G. Puttaswamy Gowda | IND | 38,063 | |
| 1985 | Sathanur | JP | 45,612 | Won | D. K. Shivakumar | INC | 29,809 | |
| 1989 | Holenarasipur | JP | 45,461 | Lost | G. Puttaswamy Gowda | INC | 53,297 | |
| 1994 | Ramanagara | JD | 47,986 | Won | C. M. Lingappa | INC | 38,392 | |

=== Lok Sabha elections ===
| Year | Constituency | Party | Votes | Result | Opposition Candidate | Opposition Party | Opposition votes | Ref |
|---|---|---|---|---|---|---|---|---|
| 1991 | Hassan | JP | 2,60,761 | Won | H. C. Srikantaiah | INC | 2,57,570 | |
| 1998 | Hassan | JD | 3,36,407 | Won | H. C. Srikantaiah | INC | 3,04,753 | |
| 1999 | Hassan | JD(S) | 2,56,587 | Lost | G. Putta Swamy Gowda | INC | 3,98,344 | |
| 2002 (bypoll) | Kanakapura | JD(S) | 5,81,709 | Won | D. K. Shivakumar | INC | 5,29,133 | |
| 2004 | Hassan | JD(S) | 4,62,625 | Won | H. C. Srikantaiah | INC | 2,72,320 | |
| 2004 | Kanakapura | JD(S) | 4,62,320 | Lost | Tejashwini Sreeramesh | INC | 2,72,320 | |
| 2009 | Hassan | JD(S) | 4,96,429 | Won | K. H. Hanume Gowda | BJP | 2,05,316 | |
| 2014 | Hassan | JD(S) | 5,09,841 | Won | A. Manju | INC | 4,09,379 | |
| 2019 | Tumkur | JD(S) | 5,82,788 | Lost | G. S. Basavaraj | BJP | 5,96,127 | |

== Detailed results ==
=== Lok Sabha elections ===
==== 2002 by-election ====
2002 By elections: Kanakapura
| Party | Candidate | Votes | % | ±% |
|---|---|---|---|---|
| JD(S) | H. D. Devegowda | 581,709 | 41.35 | +27.99 |
| INC | D. K. Shivakumar | 5,29,133 | 37.61 | −5.78 |
| BJP | K. S. Eshwarappa | 2,28,134 | 16.22 | −24.21 |
| Majority | | 52,576 | 3.74 | |
| Turnout | | 14,08,007 | | |
| Swing to JD(S) from INC | | Swing | | |

==== 2014 ====
2014 Indian general elections: Hassan
| Party | Candidate | Votes | % | ±% |
|---|---|---|---|---|
| JD(S) | H. D. Devegowda | 509,841 | 44.44 | |
| INC | A. Manju | 4,09,378 | 35.69 | |
| BJP | C. H. Vijayashankar | 1,65,688 | 14.44 | |
| Majority | | 1,00,462 | 8.76 | |
| Turnout | | 11,47,534 | 73.49 | |
| JD(S) hold | | Swing | | |

==== 2019 ====
2019 Indian general elections: Tumkur
| Party | Candidate | Votes | % | ±% |
|---|---|---|---|---|
| BJP | G. S. Basavaraj | 596,127 | 47.89 | ▲15.59 |
| JD(S) | H. D. Deve Gowda | 5,82,788 | 46.82 | ▲23.34 |
| CPI | N. Shivanna | 17,227 | 1.38 | N/A |
| NOTA | None of the Above | 10,295 | 0.83 | ▼0.34 |
| Majority | | 13,339 | 1.07 | |
| Turnout | | 12,45,469 | 77.43 | ▲4.86 |
| BJP gain from INC | | Swing | ▲15.64 | |
