= List of deputy chief ministers of Karnataka =

Karanataka government deputy head

Deputy Chief Minister of Karnataka
- Karnāṭakada Upamukhyamantri
- Emblem of Karnataka

- Flag of India

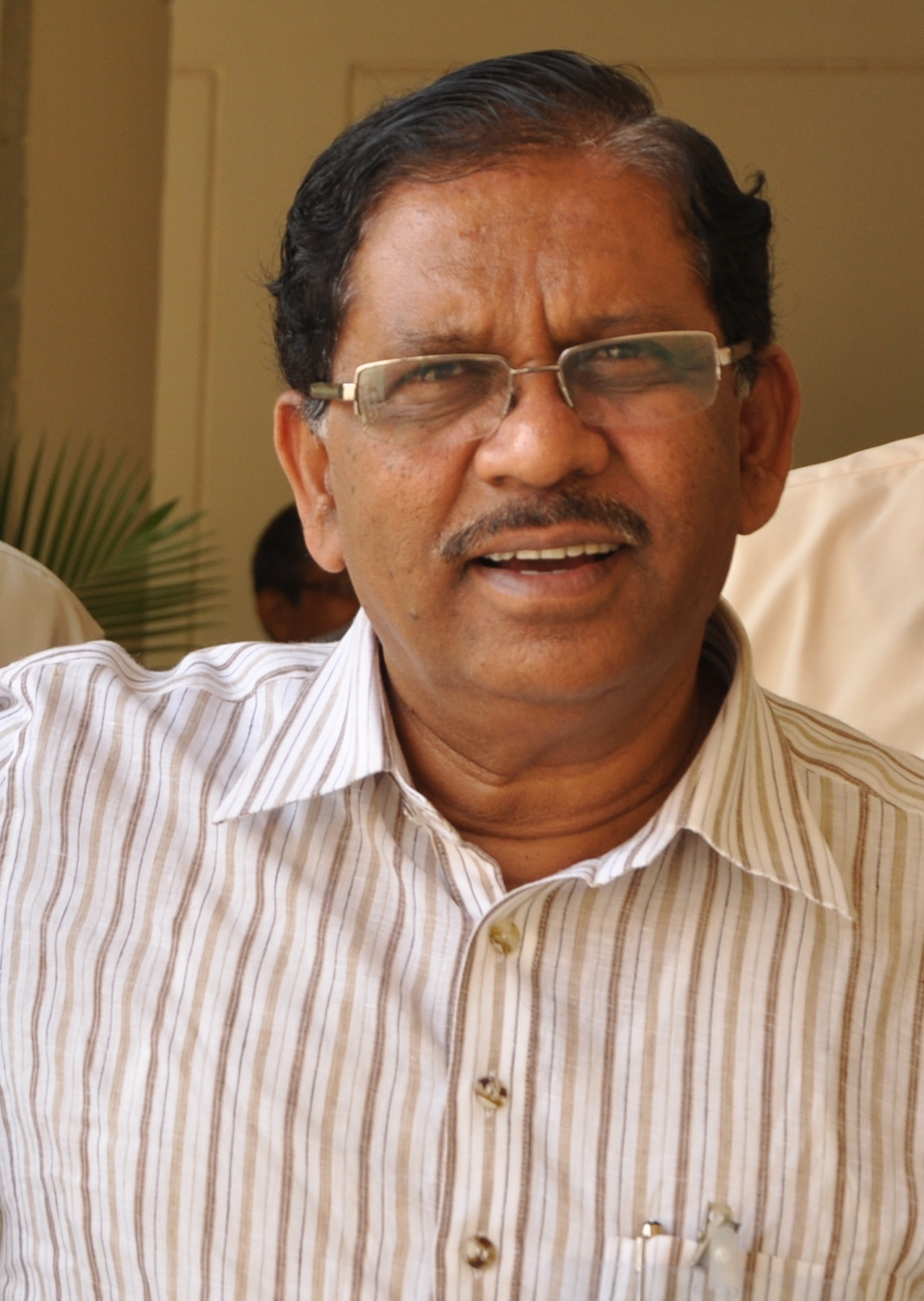
- Incumbent; G. Parameshwara since 3 June 2026
- Government of Karnataka
- Style: The Honourable (Formal); Mr. Deputy Chief Minister (Informal)
- Type: Deputy Head of Government
- Status: Deputy Leader of the Executive
- Abbreviation: DCM
- Member of: Cabinet; Karnataka Legislature
- Reports to: Chief Minister of Karnataka; Karnataka Legislature
- Seat: Vidhana Soudha
- Nominator: Members of the Government of Karnataka in Karnataka Legislative Assembly
- Appointer: Governor of Karnataka on the advice of the Chief Minister of Karnataka
- Term length: At the confidence of the assembly; Deputy Chief minister's term is for 5 years and is subject to no term limits.
- Inaugural holder: S. M. Krishna
- Formation: 19 November 1992 (33 years ago)
- Salary: ₹200,000 (US$2,100)/monthly; ₹2,400,000 (US$25,000)/annually
- Website: Official website

The deputy chief minister of Karnataka is a member of the Cabinet in the Government of Karnataka. Not technically a constitutional office, it seldom carries any specific powers. In the parliamentary system of government, According to the Constitution of India, the Governor is Karnataka's de jure head, but de facto executive authority rests with its Chief Minister; the position of deputy chief minister is used to bring political stability and strength within a coalition government or in times of hung assembly, when a proper chain of command is necessaryThe position of deputy chief minister is not explicitly defined or mentioned in the Constitution of India. However, the Supreme Court of India has stated that the appointment of deputy chief ministers is not unconstitutional. The court has clarified that a deputy chief minister, for all practical purposes, remains a minister in the council of ministers headed by the chief minister and does not draw a higher salary or perks compared to other ministers.During the absence of the chief minister, the deputy-chief minister may chair cabinet meetings and lead the assembly majority. Various deputy chief ministers have also taken the oath of secrecy in line with the one that chief minister takes. This oath has also sparked controversies.

The first deputy chief minister of Karnataka was S. M. Krishna, in M. Veerappa Moily's cabinet in 1992. The office has since been only intermittently occupied. The current Chief Minister Siddaramaiah is the longest serving deputy chief minister of Karnataka, who held the post on two occasions. Once during the chief minister-ship of J. H. Patel and another time when Dharam Singh was the chief minister. R. Ashoka and Eshwarappa were deputy chief minister of Karnataka, who took on the role when Jagadish Shettar was the chief minister. When H. D. Kumaraswamy formed a government in 2018, G. Parameshwara was sworn in as the deputy chief minister. After which when B.S. Yeddyurappa formed a government in 2019, three deputy chief ministers were sworn in, C. N. Ashwath Narayan, Govind Karjol and Laxman Savadi. For the first Karnataka witnessed three deputy chief ministers in office at the same time.

Many times there arose a proposal to make this post permanent, but nothing happened.

So far, Karnataka has witnessed 12 deputy chief ministers in nine terms; meanwhile, Siddaramaiah held the position twice.

== List of deputy chief ministers of Karnataka ==
Colour key for parties
Bharatiya Janata Party
Indian National Congress
Janata Dal
Janata Dal (Secular)

#	Portrait	Name	Constituency	Term of office			Assembly (election)	Chief Minister	Party
1		S. M. Krishna	Maddur	21 January 1993	9 December 1994	1 year, 322 days	9th (1989 election)	M. Veerappa Moily	Indian National Congress
2		J. H. Patel	Channagiri	11 December 1994	31 May 1996	1 year, 172 days	10th (1994 election)	H. D. Deve Gowda	Janata Dal
3		Siddaramaiah	Chamundeshwari	31 May 1996	22 July 1999	3 years, 52 days	10th (1994 election)	J. H. Patel	Janata Dal
Vacant (22 July 1999 – 28 May 2004)
(3)		Siddaramaiah	Chamundeshwari	28 May 2004	5 August 2005	1 year, 69 days	12th (2004 election)	Dharam Singh	Janata Dal (Secular)
4		M. P. Prakash	Hoovina Hadagali	8 August 2005	28 January 2006	173 days	12th (2004 election)	Dharam Singh	Janata Dal (Secular)
5		B. S. Yediyurappa	Shikaripura	3 February 2006	8 October 2007	1 year, 253 days	12th (2004 election)	H. D. Kumaraswamy	Bharatiya Janata Party
Vacant (9 October 2007 – 12 July 2012)
6		R. Ashoka	Padmanabha Nagar	12 July 2012	12 May 2013	304 days	13th (2008 election)	Jagadish Shettar	Bharatiya Janata Party
6		K. S. Eshwarappa	Shivamogga	12 July 2012	12 May 2013	304 days	13th (2008 election)	Jagadish Shettar	Bharatiya Janata Party
Vacant (12 May 2013 – 23 May 2018)
7		G. Parameshwara	Koratagere	23 May 2018	23 July 2019	1 year, 61 days	15th (2018 election)	H. D. Kumaraswamy	Indian National Congress
8		C. N. Ashwath Narayan	Malleshwaram	26 August 2019	26 July 2021	1 year, 340 days	15th (2018 election)	B. S. Yediyurappa	Bharatiya Janata Party
8		Govind Karjol	Mudhol	26 August 2019	26 July 2021	1 year, 340 days	15th (2018 election)	B. S. Yediyurappa	Bharatiya Janata Party
8		Laxman Savadi	MLC	26 August 2019	26 July 2021	1 year, 340 days	15th (2018 election)	B. S. Yediyurappa	Bharatiya Janata Party
Vacant (26 July 2021 – 20 May 2023)
9		D. K. Shivakumar	Kanakapura	20 May 2023	29 May 2026	3 years, 13 days	16th (2023 election)	Siddaramaiah	Indian National Congress
Vacant (29 May 2026 – 3 June 2026)
(7)		G. Parameshwara	Koratagere	3 June 2026	Incumbent	114 days	16th (2023 election)	D. K. Shivakumar	Indian National Congress

== Statistics ==
Time held in office by party (Note: This pie chart represents the distribution of time the office of Deputy Chief Minister of Karnataka has been held by each party since the position was first created on 21 January 1993, including periods when the office was vacant or not in use.)
1. Indian National Congress (18.3%)
2. Janata Dal (13.3%)
3. Bharatiya Janata Party (13.9%)
4. Janata Dal (Secular) (5.00%)
5. Position not in use (49.5%)

#	Deputy Chief Minister	Party	Term of office	
#	Deputy Chief Minister	Party	Longest term	Total duration
1	Siddaramaiah	JD/JD(S)	3 years, 52 days	4 years, 121 days
2	D. K. Shivakumar	INC	3 years, 14 days	3 years, 14 days
3	C. N. Ashwath Narayan	BJP	1 year, 340 days	1 year, 340 days
4	Govind Karjol	BJP	1 year, 340 days	1 year, 340 days
5	Laxman Savadi	BJP	1 year, 340 days	1 year, 340 days
6	S. M. Krishna	INC	1 year, 322 days	1 year, 322 days
7	G. Parameshwara*	INC	1 year, 61 days	1 year, 175 days
8	B. S. Yediyurappa	BJP	1 year, 253 days	1 year, 253 days
9	J. H. Patel	JD	1 year, 172 days	1 year, 172 days
10	K. S. Eshwarappa	BJP	304 days	304 days
11	R. Ashoka	BJP	304 days	304 days
12	M. P. Prakash	JD(S)	173 days	173 days
—	Position not in use	—	16 years, 167 days	
—	Position did not exist	—	36 years, 82 days	

== See also ==
- List of chief ministers of Karnataka
- Deputy Prime Minister of India
