= Utanahalli =

- Uttanahalli is a village near Mysore, India.
- Uttarahalli is a suburb of Bangalore, India.
