= R. Ashoka =

Indian politician

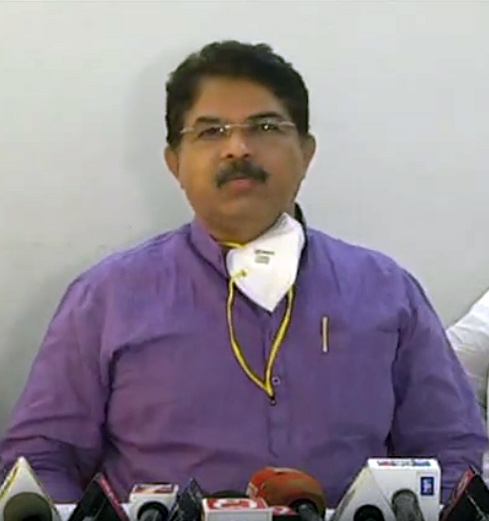
- R. Ashoka in 2020

18th Leader of the Opposition Karnataka Legislative Assembly
- Incumbent
- Assumed office 17 November 2023
- Chief Minister: Siddaramaiah; D. K Shivakumar
- Preceded by: B. S. Bommai (Acting)

Minister of Revenue Government of Karnataka
- In office 20 August 2019 – 13 May 2023
- Chief Minister: B. S. Yediyurappa; Basavaraj Bommai
- Preceded by: R. V. Deshpande

Minister of Municipal Administration Government of Karnataka
- In office 27 September 2019 – 10 February 2020
- Chief Minister: B. S. Yediyurappa
- Preceded by: R. Shankar
- Succeeded by: Narayana Gowda

Deputy Chief Minister of Karnataka
- In office 12 July 2012 – 13 May 2013 Serving with K. S. Eshwarappa
- Preceded by: B. S. Yediyurappa
- Succeeded by: G. Parameshwara

Minister of Home Affairs Government of Karnataka
- In office 23 September 2010 – 13 May 2013
- Chief Minister: B. S. Yediyurappa; Sadananda Gowda; Jagadish Shettar
- Preceded by: V. S. Acharya
- Succeeded by: K. J. George

Minister of Transport Government of Karnataka
- In office 30 May 2008 – 13 May 2013
- Chief Minister: B. S. Yediyurappa; Sadananda Gowda; Jagadish Shettar
- Preceded by: N. Chaluvaraya Swamy
- Succeeded by: Ramalinga Reddy

Minister of Health & Family Welfare Government of Karnataka
- In office 18 February 2006 – 8 October 2007
- Chief Minister: H. D. Kumaraswamy
- Preceded by: N. Chaluvaraya Swamy
- Succeeded by: B. Sriramulu

Member of Karnataka Legislative Assembly
- Incumbent
- Assumed office May 2008
- Preceded by: Seat established
- Constituency: Padmanabhanagar
- In office 1998–2008
- Preceded by: M. Srinivas
- Succeeded by: Seat disestablished
- Constituency: Uttarahalli

Personal details
- Born: 1 July 1957 (age 69) Jalahalli, Mysore State, India
- Party: Bharatiya Janata Party
- Spouse: Pramilarani (m. 1987)
- Education: Bachelor of Science
- Website: rashoka.in

Ramaiah Ashoka (born 1 July 1957) is an Indian politician who served as the Deputy Chief Minister of Karnataka from 2011 to 2013. Serving as 18th Leader of Opposition in Karnataka Legislative Assembly since 2023, he previously served as the Deputy Leader of Opposition in Karnataka Legislative Assembly (2014 -2018), Minister of Revenue, Minister of Home Affairs and Minister of Transport under the BJP government. He has also served as the Minister of Health and Family Welfare under the coalition government of BJP and JDS. He is a seven-time MLA for Padmanabhanagar Assembly Constituency (before delimitation of the Uttarahalli assembly constituency).

== Early political career ==
During the Emergency, he was arrested and detained in prison along with veteran leaders like L.K. Advani at the Central Jail in Bengaluru. He was first elected to the Karnataka Legislative Assembly in the 1997 by-elections from Uttarahalli, which was the biggest state legislature constituency in India before delimitation. He was re-elected from the same constituency in the 1999 and 2004 Assembly elections with impressive margins. In the 2004 elections, he won by a margin of 84,001 votes which is the highest in any Karnataka Assembly election.

== Positions held ==
In 2008, he became the Minister of Health and family welfare in the Bharatiya Janata Party-Janata Dal (Secular) (BJP-JD(S)) coalition government. As a minister, he implemented novel schemes and also streamlined the administration of the department.

As Minister of Transport in the Yeddyurappa Government from 2008 onwards, he was instrumental in modernizing the department and also using innovative hi-tech methods to automate the working of the department.

When Jagadish Shettar became Chief Minister in June 2012, Ashoka was appointed one of the two Deputy chief ministers and entrusted with the ministries of Home and Transport in the Government of Karnataka.

Ashoka is regarded as one of the most influential leaders of the BJP in Bangalore city and has steered the party to historic victories in the 2010 and 2015 BBMP elections.

On 26 August 2019, Ashoka was appointed the Revenue Minister in Karnataka government excluding Muzrai.

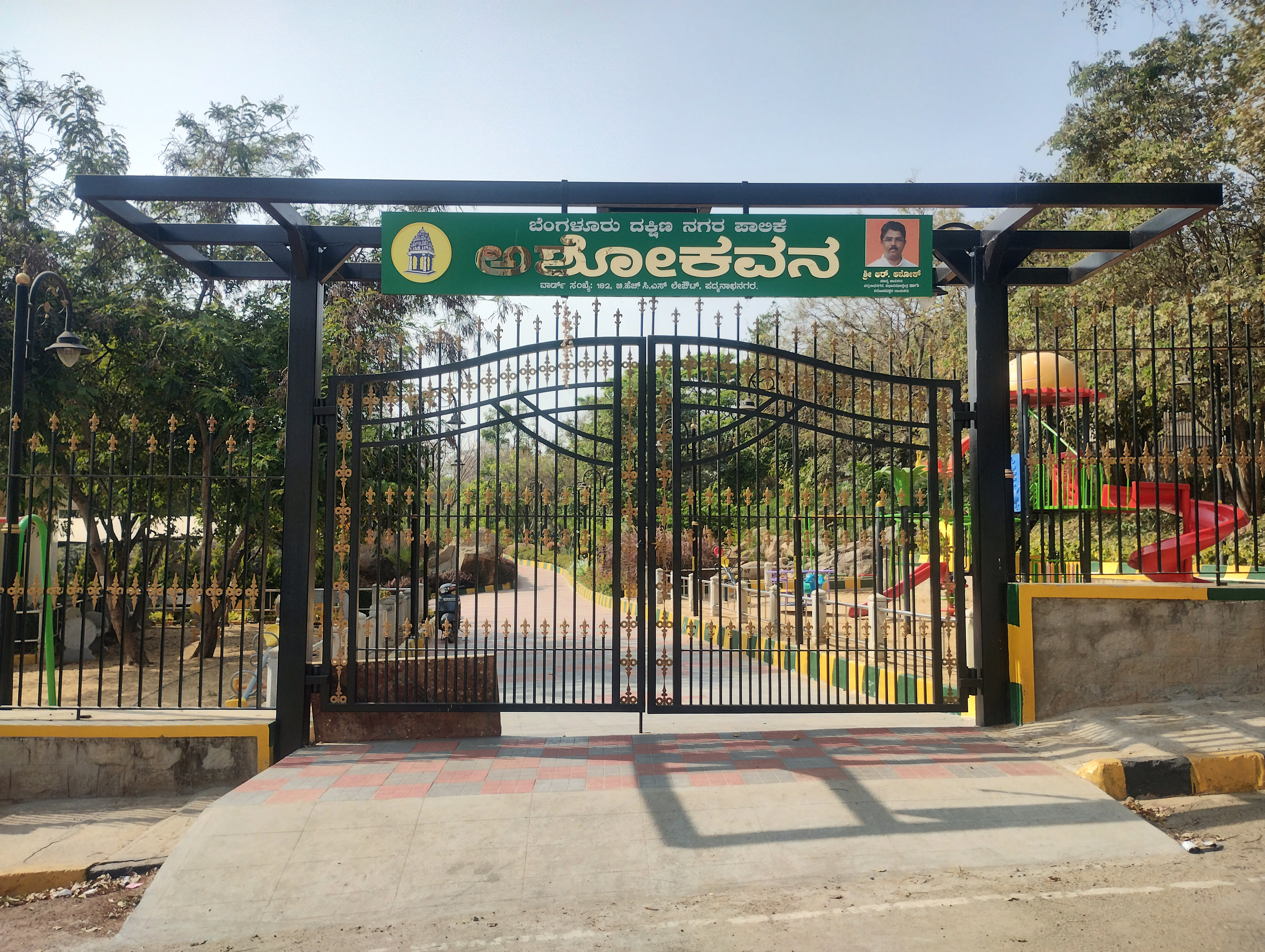
Ashokavana, a park named after R. Ashoka in Padmanabhanagar, Bangalore (2026)

Political offices
Preceded by B. S. Yeddyurappa	Deputy Chief Minister of Karnataka; 13 July 2012 – 8 May 2013	Succeeded by G. Parameshwara
