= Padmanabhanagar Assembly constituency =

Constituency of the Karnataka legislative assembly in India

Coordinates: 12.916°N 77.555°E

Padmanabhanagar
- Constituency No. 171 for the Karnataka Legislative Assembly

Constituency details
- Country: India
- Region: South India
- State: Karnataka
- District: Bangalore Urban
- Lok Sabha constituency: Bangalore South
- Established: 2008
- Total electors: 278,959 (2023)
- Reservation: None

Member of Legislative Assembly
- 16th Karnataka Legislative Assembly
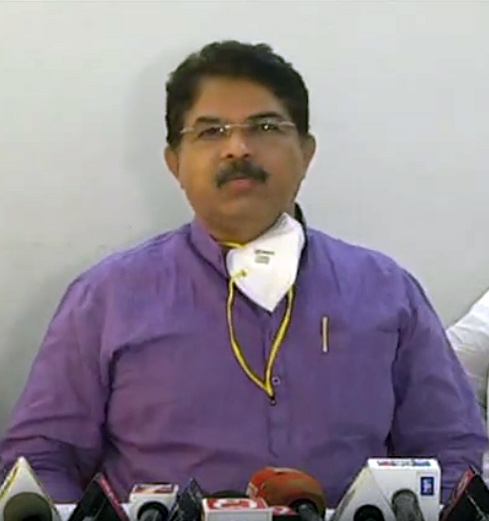
- Incumbent R. Ashoka
- Party: Bharatiya Janata Party
- Elected year: 2023

Padmanabhanagar Assembly constituency is one of the seats in Karnataka Legislative Assembly in India. It is a segment of Bangalore South Lok Sabha constituency.

Padmanabhanagar constituency (ಪದ್ಮನಾಭನಗರ) came into existence after the 2008 delimitation of assembly segments came into effect under the provisions of the Delimitation Act, 2002.

== Members of Legislative Assembly ==
Year	Member	Party
Until 2008: Constituency did not exist. See: Uttarahalli
2008	R. Ashoka	Bharatiya Janata Party
2013	R. Ashoka	Bharatiya Janata Party
2018	R. Ashoka	Bharatiya Janata Party
2023	R. Ashoka	Bharatiya Janata Party

== Election results ==
=== 2023 ===
2023 Karnataka Legislative Assembly election: Padmanaba Nagar
Party	Candidate	Votes	%	±%
BJP	R. Ashoka	98,750	61.72	+13.54
INC	V. Raghunathan Naidu	43,575	27.24	−1.04
JD(S)	Manjunath Banjarapalya	7,857	4.91	−23.37
UPP	R. Rakshit	2,789	1.74	
NOTA	None of the Above	2,367	1.48	−0.01
Majority		55,175	34.48	+14.58
Turnout		1,59,991	57.35	−0.74
BJP hold		Swing		

=== 2018 ===
2018 Karnataka Legislative Assembly election: Padmanaba Nagar
Party	Candidate	Votes	%	±%
BJP	R. Ashoka	77,868	48.18	
JD(S)	V. K. Gopal	45,702	28.28	
INC	M. Srinivas	33,400	20.67	
NOTA	None of the Above	2,404	1.49	
Majority		32,166	19.90	
Turnout		161,608	58.09	
BJP hold		Swing		

=== 2013 ===
- R Ashoka (BJP): 53,680 votes
- L S Chethan Gowda (INC): 33,557 votes
- Dr M R V Prasad (JD-S): 26,272 votes

=== 2008 ===
- R Ashoka (BJP): 61,561 votes
- M. V. Prasad Babu (JD-S): 30,285 votes

== See also ==
- List of constituencies of Karnataka Legislative Assembly
- Uttarahalli Assembly constituency
