= M. Srinivas (politician, born 1942) =

Indian politician (1942–2025)

Member of Parliament, Lok Sabha
- In office 1998–1999
- Preceded by: H. D. Kumaraswamy
- Succeeded by: M. V. Chandrashekara Murthy
- Constituency: Kanakapura Karnataka

Member of the Karnataka Legislative Assembly
- In office 2008–2013
- Preceded by: Seat established
- Succeeded by: Munirathna
- Constituency: Rajarajeshwarinagar

Member of the Karnataka Legislative Assembly
- In office 1994–1998
- Preceded by: S. Ramesh
- Succeeded by: R. Ashoka
- Constituency: Uttarahalli

Member of the Karnataka Legislative Assembly
- In office 1983–1989
- Preceded by: M.V. Rajasekharan
- Succeeded by: S. Ramesh
- Constituency: Uttarahalli

Personal details
- Born: 30 September 1942 Uttarahalli, Kingdom of Mysore, India
- Died: 17 January 2025 (aged 82) Bengaluru, Karnataka, India
- Party: Indian National Congress (from 2018)
- Other political affiliations: Bharatiya Janata Party (1993–2004, 2007–2018); Janata Dal (Secular) (2004–2007); Janata Dal (1988–1993); Janata Party (till 1988)

Muniswamappa Srinivas (30 September 1942 – 17 January 2025) was an Indian politician from Karnataka. He was elected to the Lok Sabha, the lower house of the Parliament of India from the Kanakapura Lok Sabha constituency as a member of the Bharatiya Janata Party. Srinivas died on 17 January 2025, at the age of 82.
