= D. K. Suresh =

Member of Parliament of India

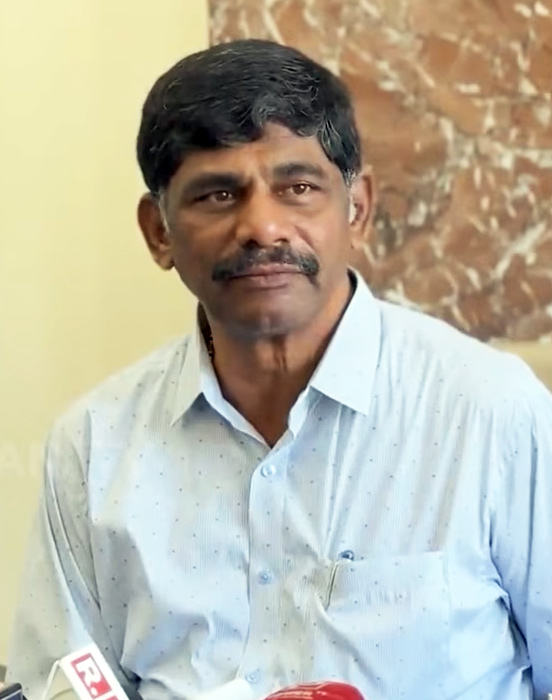
- D. K. Suresh in 2026

Member of Parliament, Lok Sabha
- In office 21 May 2013 – 4 June 2024
- Preceded by: H. D. Kumaraswamy
- Succeeded by: C. N. Manjunath
- Constituency: Bangalore Rural

Personal details
- Born: 18 December 1966 (age 59) kanakapura, Mysore State, India
- Citizenship: India
- Party: Indian National Congress.
- Children: 1 son.
- Parent(s): Doddaalahalli Kempegowda (Father), Gowramma (Mother)
- Relatives: D. K. Shivakumar (brother)
- Profession: Businessperson & Politician.
- Committees: Member, Committee on Water Resources

Doddaalahalli Kempegowda Suresh is an Indian politician and former member of Parliament of the 17th Lok Sabha of India. He represented the Bangalore Rural constituency of Karnataka and is a member of the Indian National Congress political party.

== Early life and education ==
D. K. Suresh was born in Doddaalahalli, Bengaluru south in the state of Karnataka, as the son of Kempegowda and Gowramma. He is the younger brother of D. K. Shivakumar, another noted Congress leader and the chief minister of Karnataka (2026 - ). Suresh has received education till higher secondary. By profession, Suresh is a farmer and a businessperson.

== Political career ==
D. K. Suresh is a three time MP. He was elected into 15th Lok Sabha in by-election on 21 May 2013 after sitting MP (then) H. D. Kumaraswamy’s resignation .

=== Controversy of 'separate nation' remark ===
In February 2024, D.K. Suresh (at the time a Member of Parliament) sparked controversy by suggesting that South India may need to demand a "separate country" due to perceived fiscal injustices by the central government. Suresh made this statement while reacting to the Union Budget, arguing that funds intended for South Indian states were being disproportionately redirected to North India. He highlighted that Karnataka, despite being a significant contributor to the national tax pool, faced budgetary neglect, which he attributed to policies that disadvantage the southern states.

The remarks drew immediate criticism from BJP leaders, including Tejasvi Surya, who accused Suresh of attempting to divide the nation. Surya pointed out the increase in tax devolution to Karnataka under the NDA government, contrasting it with the Congress's alleged "divide and rule" tactics. R. Ashoka, another BJP leader from Karnataka, condemned the statement as divisive, linking it to Congress’s history of partition and contrasting it with Rahul Gandhi’s “Bharat Jodo Yatra” initiative aimed at uniting India.

In response, D.K. Shivakumar, Suresh’s brother and Karnataka Congress chief, clarified that Suresh was echoing the sentiments of people who feel neglected, while reiterating his commitment to a united India. Suresh later clarified his stance on social media, describing himself as a "proud Indian and a proud Kannadiga" and emphasizing his commitment to the unity of India, while underscoring the need for fair financial treatment for Karnataka and the southern states.

== Posts held ==
#	From	To	Position
01	2013	2014	Member, 15th Lok Sabha
02	2013	2014	Member, Committee on Water Resources

== See also ==
- 15th Lok Sabha
- Politics of India
- Parliament of India
- Government of India
- Indian National Congress
- Bangalore Rural Lok Sabha constituency
