= M. V. Chandrashekara Murthy =

Indian politician

- ಎಂ. ವಿ. ಚಂದ್ರಶೇಖರ ಮೂರ್ತಿ

Minister of State for Finance (Revenue & Expenditure)
- In office 1993–1996
- Prime Minister: P. V. Narasimha Rao
- Preceded by: Rameshwar Thakur

Member of Parliament (13th Lok Sabha)
- In office 1999 – 2001 (death)
- Preceded by: M. Srinivas (Bharathiya Janata Party)
- Succeeded by: H. D. Deve Gowda (Janata Dal (Secular))
- Constituency: Kanakapura

Member of Parliament (6th, 7th, 8th, 9th and 10th Lok Sabhas)
- In office 1977–1996
- Preceded by: C. K. Jaffer Sharief (Indian National Congress)
- Succeeded by: H. D. Kumaraswamy (Janata Dal (Secular))
- Constituency: Kanakapura

Personal details
- Born: 1 September 1941 Mysore, Kingdom of Mysore, British India (now in Karnataka, India)
- Died: 21 November 2001 (aged 60) Bangalore, Karnataka, India
- Party: Indian National Congress
- Profession: Agriculturist, entrepreneur, politician
- Website: chandrashekaramurthy.in

Malavalli Venkatappa Chandrashekara Murthy (Kannada: ಮಳವಳ್ಳಿ ವೆಂಕಟಪ್ಪ ಚಂದ್ರಶೇಖರ ಮೂರ್ತಿ; 1 September 1939 – 21 November 2001), sometimes spelled M. V. Chandrashekhara Murthy, was an Indian Union Minister of State for Finance and a member of parliament representing Kanakapura (Lok Sabha constituency) of Karnataka State in the 6th, 7th, 8th, 9th, 10th and 13th Lok Sabhas.

== Early life ==
Chandrashekara Murthy was born on 1 September 1939 in Mysore, Karnataka, to Malavalli V. Venkatappa and Gowramma. Venkatappa was an agriculturalist and entrepreneur (Sri Udayaranga Motor Service, a popular bus line plying between Bangalore and Chamarajanagara, is one of his better known ventures). Venkatappa was also a Member of the Legislative Council of Karnataka for a term.

== Education ==
Chandrashekara Murthy's early schooling was in Mysore under the guidance of his maternal grandfather. He graduated with a Bachelor of Science degree from the Central College, Bangalore, and a Bachelor of Law degree from the Government Law College, Bangalore.

== Personal life ==
Chandrashekara Murthy married Umadevi Murthy (née Nanjappa) on 20 May 1968. They have two children, son Venkatesh Murthy, and daughter Srivally Murthy. Umadevi Murthy's father, V. Nanjappa was the youngest brother of Kengal Hanumanthaiah.

== Political career ==
Chandrashekara Murthy entered politics in the year 1977 winning the parliamentary elections from the erstwhile Kanakapura (Lok Sabha constituency).

Chandrashekara Murthy was always an ardent supporter of the Nehru-Gandhi family. He, as executive member of the Congress Parliamentary Party, was the one that proposed Rajiv Gandhi’s name for party president after Indira Gandhi’s death by suggesting "Let us celebrate the Congress Party centenary under the leadership of a person from the great family of the Nehrus."

Chandrashekara Murthy was always known to be honest and corruption-free. Dr. Manmohan Singh, during a memorial service, said "I was really fortunate that when I was Finance Minister this portfolio of revenue department was in [the] honest hands of Sri M. V. Chandrashekara Murthy."

Chandrashekara Murthy lost an election only once, to H. D. Kumaraswamy in 1996, which was a result of betrayal by S. M. Krishna based on his secret understanding with H. D. Deve Gowda. He, however, won his next election by such a margin that H. D. Kumaraswamy faced his worst ever defeat, even losing his deposit.

== Positions held ==
- 1977: Elected to 6th Lok Sabha
- 1979–80: General Secretary, Pradesh Congress Committee [P.C.C. (I)] Karnataka
- 1980: Re-elected to 7th Lok Sabha (2nd term)
- 1983–84: Chairman, House Committee
- 1984: Re-elected to 8th Lok Sabha (3rd term)
- 1984: Member, Public Account Committee
- 1984: Member, Consultative Committees, Ministries of Industry, Food and Civil Supplies and Civil Aviation
- 1985–86: Chairman, Committee on Papers laid on the Table
- 1989: Re-elected to 9th Lok Sabha (4th term)
- 1990: Member, Consultative Committee, Ministry of Industry
- 1991: Re-elected to 10th Lok Sabha (5th term)
- 1993–96: Union Minister of State, Finance (Revenue and Expenditure)
- 1999: Re-elected to 13th Lok Sabha (6th term)
- 1999–2000: Member, Committee on Finance

Source: Lok Sabha

== Death ==
Chandrashekara Murthy died on 21 November 2001, after a prolonged battle with cancer. He was honoured with a state funeral. His mortal remains are buried in his home town of Malavalli, Mandya District, Karnataka.

The by-election resulting from Chandrashekara Murthy's death was won by H. D. Deve Gowda of the Janata Dal (Secular), with D. K. Shivakumar of the Indian National Congress losing. Shivakumar was first encouraged in politics by Chandrashekara Murthy. It has been suggested that the by-election could have easily been won by Umadevi Murthy, who was surprisingly denied the party ticket to contest since it was generally the convention of the party to consider a near relative of deceased incumbents where possible. S. M. Krishna was blamed for this, as he was Chandrashekara Murthy's bête noire, both being powerful Vokkaliga leaders from the same region and party. It has also been suggested that S. M. Krishna had a secret understanding with H. D. Deve Gowda, as in the past. Notably, H. D. Deve Gowda had gone on record that he would not have contested if Umadevi Murthy was fielded.
