= Channapatna Assembly constituency =

Legislative Assembly constituency in Karnataka, India

Coordinates: 12.65°N 77.20°E

Channapatna
- Constituency No. 185 for the Karnataka Legislative Assembly

Constituency details
- Country: India
- Region: South India
- State: Karnataka
- District: Bengaluru South
- Lok Sabha constituency: Bangalore Rural
- Established: 1951
- Total electors: 230,381 (2023)
- Reservation: None

Member of Legislative Assembly
- 16th Karnataka Legislative Assembly
- Incumbent C. P. Yogeshwara
- Party: Indian National Congress
- Preceded by: H. D. Kumaraswamy

Channapatna Assembly constituency is one of the 224 constituencies in Karnataka Assembly is one of the constituencies located in Bengaluru South district.

It is a part of Bangalore Rural Lok Sabha constituency, along with eight other assembly constituencies. Channapatna constituency is well known for many important people in Karnataka politics. The first education minister of Mysore State, V. Venkatappa, was from this constituency.

== Members of the Legislative Assembly ==
Election	Member	Party
1952	V. Venkatappa	Indian National Congress
1957	B. K. Puttaramaiah	Praja Socialist Party
1962	B. J. Linge Gowda	Indian National Congress
1967	T. V. Krishnappa	Independent politician
1972	T. V. Krishnappa	Indian National Congress
1978	D. T. Ramu	Indian National Congress
1983	M. Varade Gowda	Janata Party
1985	M. Varade Gowda	Janata Party
1989	Sadath Ali Khan	Indian National Congress
1994	M. Varade Gowda	Janata Dal
1999	C. P. Yogeshwara	Independent politician
2004	C. P. Yogeshwara	Indian National Congress
2008	C. P. Yogeshwara	Indian National Congress
2009 By-election	Ashwath. M. C	Janata Dal
2011 By-election	C. P. Yogeshwara	Bharatiya Janata Party
2013	C. P. Yogeshwara	Samajwadi Party
2018	H. D. Kumaraswamy	Janata Dal
2023	H. D. Kumaraswamy	Janata Dal
2024 By-election	C. P. Yogeshwara	Indian National Congress

== Election results ==
=== Assembly By-election 2024 ===
2024 Karnataka Legislative Assembly by-election : Channapatna
Party	Candidate	Votes	%	±%
INC	C. P. Yogeshwara	112,642	54.44%	▲46.67
JD(S)	Nikhil Kumaraswamy	87,229	42.16%	▼6.67
Independent	Ningaraju S. D. S. S. Shanakanapura	2,352	1.14%	New
Independent	J. T. Prakash	1,649	0.80%	New
NOTA	None of the above	427	0.21%	▼0.35
Margin of victory		25,413	12.28%	▲4.23
Turnout		206,886	88.79%	▲2.90
Total valid votes		206,920		
Registered electors		232,996		▲1.14
INC gain from JD(S)		Swing	▲5.61	

=== Assembly Election 2023 ===
2023 Karnataka Legislative Assembly election : Channapatna
Party	Candidate	Votes	%	±%
JD(S)	H. D. Kumaraswamy	96,592	48.83%	▲2.28
BJP	C. P. Yogeshwara	80,677	40.79%	▲5.63
INC	Gangadhar. S	15,374	7.77%	▼8.21
NOTA	None of the above	1,110	0.56%	▼0.02
Margin of victory		15,915	8.05%	▼3.34
Turnout		197,883	85.89%	▼0.98
Total valid votes		197,796		
Registered electors		230,381		▲5.87
JD(S) hold		Swing	▲2.28	

=== Assembly Election 2018 ===
2018 Karnataka Legislative Assembly election : Channapatna
Party	Candidate	Votes	%	±%
JD(S)	H. D. Kumaraswamy	87,995	46.55%	▲3.88
BJP	C. P. Yogeshwara	66,465	35.16%	▲34.23
INC	H. M. Revanna	30,208	15.98%	▲11.27
NOTA	None of the above	1,103	0.58%	New
Margin of victory		21,530	11.39%	▲7.64
Turnout		189,028	86.87%	▲2.09
Total valid votes		189,013		
Registered electors		217,606		▲9.48
JD(S) gain from SP		Swing	▲0.13	

=== Assembly Election 2013 ===
2013 Karnataka Legislative Assembly election : Channapatna
Party	Candidate	Votes	%	±%
SP	C. P. Yogeshwara	80,099	46.42%	New
JD(S)	Anitha Kumaraswamy	73,635	42.67%	▲4.04
INC	Sadath Ali Khan	8,134	4.71%	▼3.82
BJP	Ravikumar Gowda	1,609	0.93%	▼49.67
Margin of victory		6,464	3.75%	▼8.22
Turnout		168,515	84.78%	▲5.82
Total valid votes		172,550		
Registered electors		198,769		▲5.50
SP gain from BJP		Swing	▼4.18	

=== Assembly By-election 2011 ===
2011 Karnataka Legislative Assembly by-election : Channapatna
Party	Candidate	Votes	%	±%
BJP	C. P. Yogeshwara	75,275	50.60%	▲8.45
JD(S)	S. L. Nagaraju	57,472	38.63%	▼5.06
INC	R. Ramanna	12,687	8.53%	▼3.19
Margin of victory		17,803	11.97%	▲10.42
Turnout		148,769	78.96%	▼0.15
Total valid votes		148,764		
Registered electors		188,399		▲0.93
BJP gain from JD(S)		Swing	▲6.91	

=== Assembly By-election 2009 ===
2009 Karnataka Legislative Assembly by-election : Channapatna
Party	Candidate	Votes	%	±%
JD(S)	Ashwath. M. C	64,517	43.69%	▼1.19
BJP	C. P. Yogeshwara	62,235	42.15%	▲39.76
INC	T. K. Yogesh	17,299	11.72%	▼36.59
BSP	V. S. Sujeevan Kr	1,212	0.82%	▼1.20
Margin of victory		2,282	1.55%	▼1.88
Turnout		147,665	79.11%	▲0.96
Total valid votes		147,665		
Registered electors		186,669		▲1.56
JD(S) gain from INC		Swing	▼4.62	

=== Assembly Election 2008 ===
2008 Karnataka Legislative Assembly election : Channapatna
Party	Candidate	Votes	%	±%
INC	C. P. Yogeshwara	69,356	48.31%	▼4.95
JD(S)	Ashwath. M. C	64,426	44.88%	▲5.04
BJP	N. Ramesh	3,434	2.39%	▼2.34
BSP	M. S. Mukarram	2,905	2.02%	New
Independent	Syed Zulfikar Mehdi	1,835	1.28%	New
Margin of victory		4,930	3.43%	▼9.99
Turnout		143,627	78.15%	▲6.64
Total valid votes		143,560		
Registered electors		183,793		▲9.07
INC hold		Swing	▼4.95	

=== Assembly Election 2004 ===
2004 Karnataka Legislative Assembly election : Channapatna
Party	Candidate	Votes	%	±%
INC	C. P. Yogeshwara	64,162	53.26%	▲24.33
JD(S)	Ashwath. M. C	47,993	39.84%	▲25.08
BJP	Vijaykumar. B	5,698	4.73%	▼5.57
Independent	Appaji Gowda. H. R	1,691	1.40%	New
Urs Samyuktha Paksha	Puttaswamy. L	933	0.77%	New
Margin of victory		16,169	13.42%	▼3.66
Turnout		120,490	71.51%	▼1.41
Total valid votes		120,477		
Registered electors		168,502		▲5.54
INC gain from Independent		Swing	▲7.25	

=== Assembly Election 1999 ===
1999 Karnataka Legislative Assembly election : Channapatna
Party	Candidate	Votes	%	±%
Independent	C. P. Yogeshwara	50,716	46.01%	New
INC	Sadath Ali Khan	31,888	28.93%	▼5.18
JD(S)	M. Varade Gowda	16,269	14.76%	New
BJP	T. P. Putta Siddegowda	11,350	10.30%	▲7.57
Margin of victory		18,828	17.08%	▼7.35
Turnout		116,429	72.92%	▼8.60
Total valid votes		110,223		
Rejected ballots		6,127	5.26%	▲3.90
Registered electors		159,659		▲11.08
Independent gain from JD		Swing	▼12.53	

=== Assembly Election 1994 ===
1994 Karnataka Legislative Assembly election : Channapatna
Party	Candidate	Votes	%	±%
JD	M. Varade Gowda	67,661	58.54%	▲56.55
INC	Sadath Ali Khan	39,428	34.11%	▼16.36
INC	D. T. Ramu	3,319	2.87%	New
BJP	H. M. Venkatappa	3,157	2.73%	▲0.90
JP	B. V. Venkatesh	768	0.66%	New
Margin of victory		28,233	24.43%	▲16.42
Turnout		117,175	81.52%	▲2.12
Total valid votes		115,584		
Rejected ballots		1,591	1.36%	▼1.88
Registered electors		143,735		▲9.26
JD gain from INC		Swing	▲8.07	

=== Assembly Election 1989 ===
1989 Karnataka Legislative Assembly election : Channapatna
Party	Candidate	Votes	%	±%
INC	Sadath Ali Khan	51,010	50.47%	▲6.57
JP	M. Varade Gowda	42,912	42.46%	New
Kranti Sabha	Su. Tha. Rame Gowda	2,366	2.34%	New
JD	R. J. Krishna	2,008	1.99%	New
BJP	Puttamadu	1,846	1.83%	▲1.03
Margin of victory		8,098	8.01%	▼3.40
Turnout		104,455	79.40%	▲1.93
Total valid votes		101,067		
Rejected ballots		3,388	3.24%	▲2.07
Registered electors		131,553		▲17.27
INC gain from JP		Swing	▼4.84	

=== Assembly Election 1985 ===
1985 Karnataka Legislative Assembly election : Channapatna
Party	Candidate	Votes	%	±%
JP	M. Varade Gowda	47,503	55.31%	▲3.08
INC	D. T. Ramu	37,704	43.90%	▼0.10
BJP	Siddaramu	684	0.80%	New
Margin of victory		9,799	11.41%	▲3.18
Turnout		86,911	77.47%	▲2.73
Total valid votes		85,891		
Rejected ballots		1,020	1.17%	▼0.40
Registered electors		112,183		▲16.77
JP hold		Swing	▲3.08	

=== Assembly Election 1983 ===
1983 Karnataka Legislative Assembly election : Channapatna
Party	Candidate	Votes	%	±%
JP	M. Varade Gowda	36,910	52.23%	▲29.13
INC	T. V. Krishnappa	31,094	44.00%	▲41.76
IC(S)	J. Bhoja Raj	1,201	1.70%	New
Independent	Abdul Jaleel	503	0.71%	New
Independent	B. C. Channegowda	503	0.71%	New
Independent	Javaraiah	460	0.65%	New
Margin of victory		5,816	8.23%	▼10.82
Turnout		71,801	74.74%	▼5.56
Total valid votes		70,671		
Rejected ballots		1,130	1.57%	▲0.01
Registered electors		96,068		▲7.86
JP gain from INC(I)		Swing	▲5.93	

=== Assembly Election 1978 ===
1978 Karnataka Legislative Assembly election : Channapatna
Party	Candidate	Votes	%	±%
INC(I)	D. T. Ramu	32,601	46.30%	New
Independent	B. J. Linge Gowda	19,190	27.26%	New
JP	T. V. Ramanna	16,263	23.10%	New
INC	R. Lingaiah	1,578	2.24%	▼52.40
Independent	B. K. Puttaramaiah	552	0.78%	New
Margin of victory		13,411	19.05%	▲3.17
Turnout		71,522	80.30%	▲16.09
Total valid votes		70,408		
Rejected ballots		1,114	1.56%	▲1.56
Registered electors		89,067		▲4.98
INC(I) gain from INC		Swing	▼8.34	

=== Assembly Election 1972 ===
1972 Mysore State Legislative Assembly election : Channapatna
Party	Candidate	Votes	%	±%
INC	T. V. Krishnappa	29,120	54.64%	▲7.59
INC(O)	Sivvaramaiah	20,656	38.76%	New
Independent	M. Shivalingaiah	1,708	3.20%	New
ABJS	D. Ramachandran	1,304	2.45%	New
Independent	C. S. Gundappa	507	0.95%	New
Margin of victory		8,464	15.88%	▲12.02
Turnout		54,475	64.21%	▼12.52
Total valid votes		53,295		
Registered electors		84,839		▲26.32
INC gain from Independent		Swing	▲3.74	

=== Assembly Election 1967 ===
1967 Mysore State Legislative Assembly election : Channapatna
Party	Candidate	Votes	%	±%
Independent	T. V. Krishnappa	24,875	50.90%	New
INC	B. J. Linge Gowda	22,991	47.05%	▼11.12
Independent	B. V. Venkatagirigowda	1,002	2.05%	New
Margin of victory		1,884	3.86%	▼12.48
Turnout		51,537	76.73%	▼2.87
Total valid votes		48,868		
Registered electors		67,164		▲34.16
Independent gain from INC		Swing	▼7.27	

=== Assembly Election 1962 ===
1962 Mysore State Legislative Assembly election : Channapatna
Party	Candidate	Votes	%	±%
INC	B. J. Linge Gowda	22,256	58.17%	▲18.54
PSP	B. K. Puttaramaiah	16,003	41.83%	▼9.36
Margin of victory		6,253	16.34%	▲4.78
Turnout		39,850	79.60%	▲9.15
Total valid votes		38,259		
Registered electors		50,064		▲10.48
INC gain from PSP		Swing	▲6.98	

=== Assembly Election 1957 ===
1957 Mysore State Legislative Assembly election : Channapatna
Party	Candidate	Votes	%	±%
PSP	B. K. Puttaramaiah	16,343	51.19%	New
INC	B. J. Linge Gowda	12,651	39.63%	▼12.81
Independent	Choode Gowda Alias Puttaswamy Gowda	2,930	9.18%	New
Margin of victory		3,692	11.56%	▲6.68
Turnout		31,924	70.45%	▼3.74
Total valid votes		31,924		
Registered electors		45,313		▲19.59
PSP gain from INC		Swing	▼1.25	

=== Assembly Election 1952 ===
1952 Mysore State Legislative Assembly election : Channapatna
Party	Candidate	Votes	%	±%
INC	V. Venkatappa	14,741	52.44%	New
KMPP	B. K. Puttaramaiah	13,369	47.56%	New
Margin of victory		1,372	4.88%	
Turnout		28,110	74.19%	
Total valid votes		28,110		
Registered electors		37,891		
INC win (new seat)				
