= Kanakapura Lok Sabha constituency =

Former constituency of the Indian parliament in Karnataka

Coordinates: 12.5°N 77.4°E

Kanakapura
- Former Lok Sabha constituency

Constituency details
- Country: India
- Region: South India
- State: Karnataka
- Established: 1967
- Abolished: 2009
- Reservation: None

Kanakapura Lok Sabha constituency was a former Lok Sabha constituency in Karnataka state in southern India. It included eight Assembly constituencies, namely Kanakapura, Ramanagaram, Channapatna, Magadi, Sathanur, Uttarahalli, Malavalli and Anekal. Out of them, Kanakapura, Ramanagaram, Channapatna, Magadi and Anekal assembly segments were retained in the Bangalore Rural constituency created in 2008 as part of delimitation in Karnataka. Sathanur segment was merged between Kanakapura, Ramanagaram and Channapatna constituencies. Malavalli became a part of Mandya constituency and Uttarahalli was reformed and Uttarahalli Circle was merged with new Bangalore South Assembly Constituency. Former prime minister Deve Gowda won from this constituency in the 2002 bypoll but lost the next and last election in 2004, won by Tejashwini, before it was abolished.

The new Assembly Constituencies Bangalore South, Anekal, and Rajarajeshwarinagar became a part of Bangalore Rural along with Kunigal Assembly Constituency from Tumkur district

== Members of Parliament ==
Year	Member	Party
Till 1967 : Constituency did not exist
1952	M. V. Rajasekharan	Indian National Congress
1971	C. K. Jaffer Sharief	Indian National Congress
1977	M. V. Chandrashekara Murthy	Indian National Congress
1980	M. V. Chandrashekara Murthy	Indian National Congress (I)
1984	M. V. Chandrashekara Murthy	Indian National Congress
1989	M. V. Chandrashekara Murthy	Indian National Congress
1991	M. V. Chandrashekara Murthy	Indian National Congress
1996	H. D. Kumaraswamy	Janata Dal
1998	M. Srinivas	Bharatiya Janata Party
1999	M. V. Chandrashekara Murthy	Indian National Congress
2002^	H. D. Deve Gowda	Janata Dal
2004	Tejashwini Sreeramesh	Indian National Congress
After 2009 : Constituency Abolished

^ Denote By-Elections

== Election results ==
=== 2004 ===
2004 Indian general election: Kanakapura
Party	Candidate	Votes	%	±%
INC	Tejashwini Gowda	584,238	37.63	▲0.02
BJP	Ramachandra Gowda	4,67,575	30.12	▲13.90
JD(S)	H. D. Deve Gowda	4,62,320	29.78	▼11.57
Independent	Muniramaiah	23,350	1.50	N/A
Independent	G. S. Kumar	14,933	0.96	N/A
Majority		1,16,663	7.51	▲3.77
Turnout		15,52,416		
Swing to INC from JD(S)		Swing		

=== 2002 by-election ===
2002 By elections: Kanakapura
Party	Candidate	Votes	%	±%
JD(S)	H. D. Devegowda	581,709	41.35	+27.99
INC	D. K. Shivakumar	5,29,133	37.61	−5.78
BJP	K. S. Eshwarappa	2,28,134	16.22	−24.21
Majority		52,576	3.74	
Turnout		14,08,007		
Swing to JD(S) from INC		Swing		

=== 1999 ===
1999 Indian general election: Kanakapura
Party	Candidate	Votes	%	±%
INC	M. V. Chandrashekara Murthy	532,910	43.19	▲5.55
BJP	M. Srinivas	4,98,893	40.43	▲1.43
JD(S)	H. D. Kumaraswamy	1,62,448	13.17	New entry
Independent	Veerappa	33,322	2.70	N/A
Independent	N. Brahmananda	6,252	0.51	N/A
Majority		34,017	2.76	▲1.40
Turnout		12,75,773	60.45	
Swing to INC from BJP		Swing		

=== 1998 ===
1998 Indian general election: Kanakapura
Party	Candidate	Votes	%	±%
BJP	M. Srinivas	470,387	39.00	▲15.40
INC	Dr. D. Premachandra Sagar	4,53,946	37.64	▲5.80
JD	H. D. Kumaraswamy	2,60,859	21.63	▼20.48
BSP	Muniyappa	15,732	1.30	New entry
Independent	Ram Avathar Agarwal	3,255	0.27	N/A
Independent	G. Srinivas	1,397	0.12	N/A
Independent	H. G. Srinivas	465	0.04	N/A
Majority		16,441	1.36	▼8.91
Turnout		12,28,049	63.90	
Swing to BJP from INC		Swing		

=== 1996 ===
1996 Indian general election: Kanakapura
Party	Candidate	Votes	%	±%
JD	H. D. Kumaraswamy	440,444	42.11	▲15.95
INC	M. V. Chandraseekhara Murthy	3,33,040	31.84	▼6.18
BJP	Ramachandra Gowda	2,46,838	23.60	▼10.20
Independent	16 Independent Candidates	25,589	2.45	N/A
Majority		1,07,404	10.27	▲6.05
Turnout				
Swing to JD from INC		Swing		

=== 1991 ===
1991 Indian general election: Kanakapura
Party	Candidate	Votes	%	±%
INC	M. V. Chandrashekara Murthy	301,455	38.02	▼14.97
BJP	Ramachandra Gowda	2,67,992	33.80	New entry
JD	P. G. R. Sindhia	2,07,376	26.16	▲1.81
BSP	B. Gopal	4,509	0.57	New entry
Independent	7 Independent Candidates	11,505	1.45	N/A
Majority		33,463	4.22	▼24.42
Turnout		8,10,336	59.13	
INC hold		Swing		

=== 1989 ===
1989 Indian general election: Kanakapura
Party	Candidate	Votes	%	±%
INC	M. V. Chandrashekhara Murthy	472,265	52.99	▲5.21
JD	C. Narayanaswamy	2,17,044	24.35	New entry
JP	B. L. Lakke Gowda	1,85,716	20.84	▼25.84
KRRS	M. Basappaji	10,553	1.18	New entry
LKD	K. G. Ashwathanarayanaiah	2,832	0.32	New entry
Independent	C. Mahadevaswamy	2,772	0.31	N/A
Majority		2,55,221	28.64	▲27.54
Turnout		9,23,505	68.14	
INC hold		Swing		

=== 1984 ===
1984 Indian general election: Kanakapura
Party	Candidate	Votes	%	±%
INC	M. V. Chandrashekara Murthy	305,210	47.78	▼5.65
JP	P. G. R. Sindhiya	2,98,184	46.68	▲20.45
LKD	M. P. Krishnappa	17,303	2.71	New entry
Independent	A. J. Sadashiva	9,292	1.45	N/A
Independent	K. Annaiah	2,129	0.33	N/A
Independent	Devagiri Panduranga	2,105	0.33	N/A
Independent	K. S. Krishna Murthy	1,349	0.21	N/A
Independent	Ramakrishna Naik	1,239	0.19	N/A
Independent	Mohammed Facrudin	1,018	0.16	N/A
Independent	Basheer Ahamed	891	0.14	N/A
Majority		7,026	1.10	▼26.10
Turnout		6,52,044	72.16	
INC hold		Swing		

=== 1980 ===
1980 Indian general election: Kanakapura
Party	Candidate	Votes	%	±%
INC(I)	M. V. Chandrasekhara Murthy	252,383	53.43	▲6.28
JP	M. V. Rajasekharan	1,23,879	26.23	▼19.78
INC(U)	S. Kariyappa	67,960	14.39	New entry
JP(S)	M. P. Krishnappa	17,767	3.76	New entry
Independent	C. Mahadevaswamy	4,498	0.95	N/A
Independent	M. Krishanswamy	3,668	0.78	N/A
Independent	Arun Nagarkatti	834	0.18	N/A
Independent	R. Siddaiah	793	0.17	N/A
Independent	G. K. Siddaiah	563	0.12	N/A
Majority		1,28,504	27.20	▲26.06
Turnout		4,86,180	61.93	
Swing to INC(I) from INC		Swing		

=== 1977 ===
1977 Indian general election: Kanakapura
Party	Candidate	Votes	%	±%
INC	M. V. Chandrasekhara Murthy	192,111	47.15	▼32.82
JP	M. V. Rajasekharan	1,87,459	46.01	New entry
Independent	Shivanna	20,849	5.12	N/A
Independent	C. Mahadevaswamy	7,039	1.73	N/A
Majority		4,652	1.14	▼59.99
Turnout		4,18,814	62.18	
INC hold		Swing		

=== 1971 ===
1971 Indian general election: Kanakapura
Party	Candidate	Votes	%	±%
INC	C. K. Jaffer Sharief	243,987	79.97	▲34.40
INC(O)	M. V. Rajasekharan	57,468	18.84	New entry
Independent	Abdul Rasheed	3,631	1.19	N/A
Majority		1,86,519	61.13	▲43.04
Turnout		3,13,659	64.77	
INC hold		Swing		

=== 1967 ===
1967 Indian general election: Kanakapura
Party	Candidate	Votes	%	±%
INC	M. V. Rajasekharan	121,394	45.57	New entry
Independent	M. B. Das	73,198	27.48	N/A
Independent	T. Ramaiah	34,296	12.87	N/A
SWA	B. K. Puttaramiya	21,834	8.20	New entry
Independent	S. Ahamad	10,902	4.09	N/A
Independent	H. N. Reddy	4,756	1.79	N/A
Majority		48,196	18.09	New entry
Turnout		2,81,621	63.38	New entry
INC win (new seat)				

== See also ==
- Bangalore Rural Lok Sabha constituency
- List of former constituencies of the Lok Sabha
