= S. Ramesh =

Indian politician

Member of the Legislative Assembly
- In office 1989–1994
- Preceded by: M. Srinivas
- Succeeded by: M. Srinivas
- Constituency: Uttarahalli

Personal details
- Born: 1953/54
- Died: July 7, 2006 Bangalore, Karnataka
- Party: Indian National Congress (1968-1994, 1996-2006), Karnataka Congress Party (1994–96)
- Spouse: Hemalatha
- Children: One son (Pavankumar Ramesh) and one daughter (Mahalakshmi Chari), two grandchildren( Malolan Chari & Medani P)

S. Ramesh was an Indian politician. He was elected to the Karnataka Legislative Assembly, the lower house of the bicameral legislature of the southern Indian state of Karnataka, from the Uttarahalli constituency as a member of the Indian National Congress. Ramesh was also a film producer and was former Karnataka Film Chamber of Commerce President. He had also acted in the film 'Gokarna' produced by Upendra. He had been a Minister in the Bangarappa government in 1990 and been a trade union leader. Ramesh started his career in the youth congress and was President of the Pradesh Youth Congress for a brief period. He unsuccessfully contested from Krishnaraja constituency of Mysore and M. K. Somashekar of Janata Dal (Secular) was victorious during 2004 Karnataka Legislative Assembly elections.

== Positions held ==
- Minister of Karnataka State Government
- General Secretary, Karnataka Pradesh Youth
- President, Karnataka Pradesh Youth Congress (I)
- Member, Karnataka Pradesh Youth Congress (I) Poll Panel
- President, Karnataka Slum Dwellers Congress
- Member of Karnataka Legislative Assembly from Uttarahalli
- President Bharath Electronics Limited, Employees Union
- Advisor Escorts Ltd., Employees Union
- President Stumpp Scheule & Somappa Ltd., Union
- President Amco Batteries Employees Union
- President Karnataka Rajiv Gandhi Auto Owners & Drivers Association
- President Karnataka Film Chamber of Commerce
- Vice Chairman International Film Festival
- President Dasooha Trust Chamundi Hills
- President Karnataka Film Chamber of Commerce.

== Controversies ==
=== Gangaiah Murder ===
Ramesh had allegedly snatched a gun from his security guard Krishnappa and shot dead Gangaiah during clashes with Janata Dal supporters outside an inspection bungalow in Kunigal, Tumkur district. This happened during the assembly by-elections in the constituency in June 1992. Following the incident, an investigation was ordered by then Chief Minister Bangarappa, which gave a clean chit to Ramesh in its 'B' summary report to the Kunigal magistrate's court. Veerappa Moily, who took over as the chief minister in 1993 appointed retired judge M.S. Patil to inquire into the incident. In June 1995, Patil submitted his findings to the Government. In late February 1996, the Government tabled the report in legislature since such reports should be within eight months of submission. The report accused the police for clearing the minister of the murder charges and reiterated that Gangaiah had sustained the bullet injury as a result of the firing by Ramesh, which lead to his death. The report accused investigating officer G.K. Bekal "A cursory reading of the 'B' summary report would show that he (Bekal) played the role of a judge and virtually wrote a judgment of acquittal." Following the tabling of the report, Home Minister P.G.R. Sindhia announced that the Government would withdraw the 'B' report and launch criminal proceedings against Ramesh and Krishnappa based on the Patil committee findings. Both the two accused had sought anticipatory bail.

== Death ==
He died of heart attack on 7th July 2006. He was survived by his wife and two children.

== Filmography ==
He produced many movies in Kannada, including Cheluva and Thandege Thakka Maga. He also acted in Gokarna.

=== As actor ===
- Gokarna (2003)

=== As producer ===
- Cheluva (1997)
- Ravivarma (1992) (Produced by his wife Hemalatha Ramesh)
- Ezhai Jaathi (1993) (Produced by his wife Hemalatha Ramesh)
- Thandege Thakka Maga (2006)
