= Uttarahalli Assembly constituency =

Former constituency in Karnataka, India

Coordinates: 12.906°N 77.547°E

Uttarahalli
- Former constituency No. 89 for the Karnataka Legislative Assembly

Constituency details
- Country: India
- Region: South India
- State: Karnataka
- District: Bangalore Urban
- Lok Sabha constituency: Kanakapura
- Established: 1962
- Abolished: 2008
- Reservation: None

Uttarahalli Assembly constituency was one of the constituencies in Karnataka Legislative Assembly in India. Its electoral size had gradually become one of the biggest in India. It was abolished in the 2008 delimitation exercise, in accordance with the provisions of the Delimitation Act, 2002, and split into smaller segments.

== Members of the Legislative Assembly ==
Election	Member	Party
1962	J. Srinivasa Reddy	Independent politician
1967	Y. Ramakrishna	Indian National Congress
1972	B. Basavalingappa	Indian National Congress
1978	M. V. Rajasekharan	Janata Party
1983	M. Srinivas	Janata Party
1985	M. Srinivas	Janata Party
1989	S. Ramesh	Indian National Congress
1994	M. Srinivas	Bharatiya Janata Party
1998^	R. Ashoka	Bharatiya Janata Party
1999	R. Ashoka	Bharatiya Janata Party
2004	R. Ashoka	Bharatiya Janata Party

== Election results ==
=== Assembly Election 2004 ===
2004 Karnataka Legislative Assembly election : Uttarahalli
Party	Candidate	Votes	%	±%
BJP	R. Ashoka	313,309	45.38	▼4.41
INC	S. T. Somashekhar	229,308	33.22	▼11.42
JD(S)	M. Srinivas	130,153	18.85	▲14.87
USP	Gopala Krishnegowda. L	6,128	0.89	New
KNP	Vivekananda S. K.	4,870	0.71	New
Margin of victory		84,001	12.17	▲7.02
Turnout		690,363	50.17	▲2.48
Total valid votes		690,363		
Registered electors		1,376,130		▲38.50
BJP hold		Swing	▼4.41	

=== Assembly Election 1999 ===
1999 Karnataka Legislative Assembly election : Uttarahalli
Party	Candidate	Votes	%	±%
BJP	R. Ashoka	230,914	49.79	▲3.30
INC	S. Ramesh	207,009	44.64	▲6.45
JD(S)	D. Muniraju	18,471	3.98	New
Margin of victory		23,905	5.15	▼3.15
Turnout		473,864	47.69	▲19.40
Total valid votes		463,769		
Rejected ballots		10,095	2.13	▲1.14
Registered electors		993,571		▲15.61
BJP hold		Swing	▲3.30	

=== Assembly By-election 1998 ===
1998 Karnataka Legislative Assembly by-election : Uttarahalli
Party	Candidate	Votes	%	±%
BJP	R. Ashoka	111,920	46.49	▲3.47
INC	S. Ramesh	91,946	38.19	▲8.86
JD	H. M. Muninarayana	34,950	14.52	▼8.16
Margin of victory		19,974	8.30	▼5.39
Turnout		243,155	28.29	▼25.70
Total valid votes		240,744		
Rejected ballots		2,411	0.99	▼0.86
Registered electors		859,453		▲35.72
BJP hold		Swing	▲3.47	

=== Assembly Election 1994 ===
1994 Karnataka Legislative Assembly election : Uttarahalli
Party	Candidate	Votes	%	±%
BJP	M. Srinivas	144,193	43.02	▲39.69
INC	S. Ramesh	98,315	29.33	▼25.02
JD	H. M. Muninarayana	76,008	22.68	▼8.40
INC	Ramu. M	5,670	1.69	New
Margin of victory		45,878	13.69	▼9.58
Turnout		341,896	53.99	▲1.30
Total valid votes		335,167		
Rejected ballots		6,320	1.85	▼2.53
Registered electors		633,241		▲38.65
BJP gain from INC		Swing	▼11.33	

=== Assembly Election 1989 ===
1989 Karnataka Legislative Assembly election : Uttarahalli
Party	Candidate	Votes	%	±%
INC	S. Ramesh	125,065	54.35	▲12.70
JD	M. Srinivas	71,523	31.08	New
JP	H. Hanumantharayappa	21,449	9.32	New
BJP	L. Gurumurthyreddy	7,658	3.33	New
Margin of victory		53,542	23.27	▲12.50
Turnout		240,625	52.69	▼2.91
Total valid votes		230,096		
Rejected ballots		10,529	4.38	▲2.82
Registered electors		456,705		▲77.90
INC gain from JP		Swing	▲1.93	

=== Assembly Election 1985 ===
1985 Karnataka Legislative Assembly election : Uttarahalli
Party	Candidate	Votes	%	±%
JP	M. Srinivas	73,655	52.42	▲1.82
INC	S. Ramesh	58,522	41.65	▼1.04
LKD	M. G. Mani Heggade	4,243	3.02	New
Independent	Muninarasappa	853	0.61	New
Margin of victory		15,133	10.77	▲2.86
Turnout		142,749	55.60	▼6.42
Total valid votes		140,518		
Rejected ballots		2,231	1.56	▼1.26
Registered electors		256,723		▲50.05
JP hold		Swing	▲1.82	

=== Assembly Election 1983 ===
1983 Karnataka Legislative Assembly election : Uttarahalli
Party	Candidate	Votes	%	±%
JP	M. Srinivas	52,175	50.60	▲2.03
INC	C. Narayana Reddy	44,018	42.69	▲37.51
BJP	V. R. Bolar	3,915	3.80	New
Independent	Venkatesh Murthy	825	0.80	New
Independent	Thimmanna	648	0.63	New
Margin of victory		8,157	7.91	▲3.44
Turnout		106,106	62.02	▼7.51
Total valid votes		103,115		
Rejected ballots		2,991	2.82	▼0.23
Registered electors		171,092		▲64.35
JP hold		Swing	▲2.03	

=== Assembly Election 1978 ===
1978 Karnataka Legislative Assembly election : Uttarahalli
Party	Candidate	Votes	%	±%
JP	M. V. Rajasekharan	34,081	48.57	New
INC(I)	S. C. Venkatesh	30,944	44.10	New
INC	N. Chikke Gowda	3,632	5.18	▼58.11
Independent	Chandrappa	689	0.98	New
Independent	Chandrasekharaiah	607	0.87	New
Margin of victory		3,137	4.47	▼22.11
Turnout		72,381	69.53	▲20.30
Total valid votes		70,172		
Rejected ballots		2,209	3.05	▲3.05
Registered electors		104,102		▲42.51
JP gain from INC		Swing	▼14.72	

=== Assembly Election 1972 ===
1972 Mysore State Legislative Assembly election : Uttarahalli
Party	Candidate	Votes	%	±%
INC	B. Basavalingappa	21,903	63.29	▼4.02
INC(O)	Y. Ramakrishna	12,704	36.71	New
Margin of victory		9,199	26.58	▼31.95
Turnout		35,965	49.23	▲14.46
Total valid votes		34,607		
Registered electors		73,050		▲32.62
INC hold		Swing	▼4.02	

=== Assembly Election 1967 ===
1967 Mysore State Legislative Assembly election : Uttarahalli
Party	Candidate	Votes	%	±%
INC	Y. Ramakrishna	11,886	67.31	▲20.84
Independent	C. V. Shamabhovi	1,550	8.78	New
Independent	H. K. Murthy	1,286	7.28	New
Independent	Pujadalaiah	1,102	6.24	New
Independent	Pujarangiah	884	5.01	New
Independent	Challiah	665	3.77	New
Independent	D. Munichinnappa	286	1.62	New
Margin of victory		10,336	58.53	▲51.48
Turnout		19,151	34.77	▼26.76
Total valid votes		17,659		
Registered electors		55,082		▼1.00
INC gain from Independent		Swing	▲13.78	

=== Assembly Election 1962 ===
1962 Mysore State Legislative Assembly election : Uttarahalli
Party	Candidate	Votes	%	±%
Independent	J. Srinivasa Reddy	17,139	53.53	New
INC	A. V. Narasimha Reddy	14,881	46.47	New
Margin of victory		2,258	7.05	
Turnout		34,237	61.53	
Total valid votes		32,020		
Registered electors		55,639		
Independent win (new seat)				

== See also ==
- List of constituencies of Karnataka Legislative Assembly
