= C. P. Yogeshwara =

Indian politician

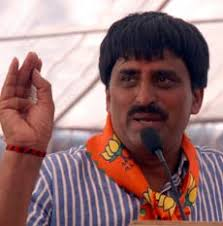

Minister of Tourism, Environment and Ecology, Government of Karnataka
- In office 21 January 2021 – 26 July 2021
- Preceded by: C. T. Ravi; Anand Singh
- Succeeded by: Anand Singh

Minister of Forest, Government of Karnataka
- In office 4 August 2011 – 12 July 2012
- Preceded by: C. H. Vijayashankar

Member of Karnataka Legislative Assembly
- In office 13 May 2011 – 16 May 2018
- Preceded by: M. C. Ashwath
- Succeeded by: H. D. Kumaraswamy
- Constituency: Channapatna
- In office 7 Oct 1999 – 20 Aug 2009
- Preceded by: M. Varade Gowda
- Succeeded by: M. C. Ashwath
- Constituency: Channapatna

Personal details
- Born: 29 August 1963 (age 63) Chakkere (Channapatna Taluk, Ramanagara District)
- Party: Indian National Congress (2004–2009, 2014–2017, 2024–present)
- Other political affiliations: Bharatiya Janata Party (2009–2013, 2017–2024); Samajwadi Party (2013–2014); Independent (1999–2004)
- Spouse(s): Manju Kumari N. aka Malvikaa Solanki (1986–2004); Sheela Yogeshwar (m. 2006)
- Children: Nisha
- Occupation: Politician, Actor

Chakkere Puttamade Gowda Yogeshwara is an Indian politician and actor from Karnataka who served as the Minister of Tourism, Environment and Ecology Department of Karnataka from 21 January 2021 to 26 July 2021. He is a member of the Karnataka Legislative Assembly representing the Channapatna constituency. He also worked in Kannada Film Industry (Sandalwood) in lead roles. Many of his performances in his films were praised. His last role was in the movie Attahasa as a cop, the film was based on the life of Veerappan. He was nominated as MLC on 22/07/2020 from BJP.

== Early life ==
C.P. Yogeshwar was born on 29 August 1963 in Chakere village, Channapatna Taluk, Ramnagara Dist. in Karnataka. He has completed his B.Sc. from V.V. Puram College, Bangalore in the years 1983–1986.

== Political career ==
=== Ministry ===
He was the Minister for Forest in the B.S. Yeddyurappa led Karnataka Government.

=== 2024 Channapatna assembly by-poll ===
BJP leader and former minister C.P. Yogeshwar resigned as an MLC after he was denied the party ticket for the Channapatna Assembly bypoll, with the seat being allotted to alliance partner JD(S).

He joined Congress party and got the ticket for Channapatna bypoll.

Congress candidate C.P. Yogeshwar won the Channapatna bypoll, defeating JD(S) candidate Nikhil Kumaraswamy, son of H.D. Kumaraswamy and grandson of former PM H.D. Deve Gowda. Nikhil secured 87,229 votes, while Yogeshwar polled 1,12,642 votes, marking a significant victory for Congress in the constituency.

== Election History ==
=== Legislative Assembly ===
Year	Constituency	Party	Votes	%	Opponent	Party	Votes	%	Result	Margin	%
2025 (Note: By-Election)	Channapatna	INC	1,12,642	54.44	Nikhil Kumaraswamy	JD(S)	87,229	42.16	Won	+25,413	+12.28
2023	Channapatna	BJP	80,677	40.79	H. D. Kumaraswamy	JD(S)	96,592	48.83	Lost	-15,915	-8.04
2018	Channapatna	BJP	66,465	35.16	H. D. Kumaraswamy	JD(S)	87,995	46.55	Lost	-21,530	-11.39
2013	Channapatna	SP	80,099	46.42	Anitha Kumaraswamy	JD(S)	73,635	42.67	Won	+6,464	+3.75
2011	Channapatna	BJP	75,275	50.60	S. L. Nagaraju	JD(S)	57,472	38.63	Won	+17,803	+11.97
2009	Channapatna	BJP	62,235	42.15	M. C. Ashwath	JD(S)	64,517	43.69	Lost	-2,282	-1.54
2008	Channapatna	INC	69,356	48.31	M. C. Ashwath	JD(S)	64,426	44.88	Won	+4,930	+3.43
2004	Channapatna	INC	64,162	53.26	M. C. Ashwath	JD(S)	47,993	39.84	Won	+16,169	+13.42
1999	Channapatna	IND	50,716	46.01	Sadath Ali Khan	INC	31,888	28.93	Won	+18,828	+17.08

== Film career ==
He acted in the following films:

- Uttara Dhruvadim Dakshina Dhruvaku (2000; also story writer)
- Shivappa Nayaka (2001)
- Sainika (2002)
- Kambala Halli (2002)
- Panchali (2003)
- Badri (2003)
- Preethi Nee Illade Naa Hegirali (2004)
- Sri Kshetra Adichunchanagiri (2012)
