= Tejashwini Gowda =

Indian politician

Tejaswini Gowda

Member of Legislative Council Karnataka
- In office 18 July 2018 – March 2024
- Constituency: Karnataka

Member of Parliament, Lok Sabha
- In office 2004–2009
- Preceded by: H. D. Deve Gowda
- Succeeded by: H. D. Kumaraswamy (as MP for Bangalore Rural)
- Constituency: Kanakapura

Personal details
- Born: 11 November 1966 (age 59) Doddarayappanahalli
- Party: Indian National Congress (2024– present)
- Other political affiliations: Indian National Congress (2004-2014); Bharatiya Janata Party (2014-2024)
- Spouse: Sreeramesh
- Children: 2
- Website: http://tejasvinigowda.com/
- As of 6 April, 2009

Tejaswini Gowda (born 11 November 1966) was a member of the 14th Lok Sabha (2004–2009) from Kanakapura in Karnataka (India), representing Congress Party. This seat morphed into Bangalore (Rural) seat, and she contested from the new seat in 2009 when she came third. In March 2014 she quit INC and joined BJP. In March 2024, she resigned as the Karnataka Legislative Council member.

== Early life and education ==
Tejaswini was born on 11 November 1966 to Muninanjappa and Munithayamma at Doddarayappanahalli, in Bangalore Rural district. She holds a master's degree in political science and a bachelor's degree in law from Vivekanda Law College, Bangalore. She is also holds a doctorate from Bangalore University. She has a son and a daughter.

== Life as a journalist ==
Before entering politics, Tejashwini was a research scholar and used to write on various aspects of life and society. She has also travelled into the tribal belts of Chhattisgarh and Bastar to produce television documentaries.

Her popularity among the crowds increased immensely after she started to host the chart show "Mukha Mukhi" (in Kannada it means face to face). Her popularity started to increase after she interviewed many political personalities. Her chat show was able to increase its popularity due to its content, which asked questions related to politician's inter-party squabbling and corruption.

== Electoral performance ==
Taking the advantage of her popularity, before the 14th Loksabha elections in 2004, Tejashwini joined the Indian National Congress. She was given the ticket from the Congress party on the last day of nominations. She was able to win by a margin of over one lakh votes, defeating Bharatiya Janata Party's leader Ramachandra Gowda, and former PM Deve Gowda who came third in Kanakpura but won from the other seat (Hassan) which he had contested. She was the candidate of INC from the Bangalore Rural Constituency in the General Elections 2009, and she came third behind the JD(S) and BJP candidates.

== See also ==
- Members of the Fourteenth Lok Sabha
