= Uttanahalli =

Village near Mysore, Karnataka, India

Coordinates: 12.250112°N 76.693947°E

Uthanahalli is a small village on Ooty Road near Mysore, Karnataka, India.

== Location ==
Uthanahalli is about five kilometres from Mysore on the highway to Nanjangud.

== Transportation ==
City bus number 203 comes directly from City Bus Station, Mysore to Uthanahalli. The route to the village passes through Chamundi Hill footroad, Hosahundi and the APMC Yard.

== APMC yard ==
The Agricultural produce marketing centre of Mysore district is located near Uthanahalli. Farmers sell their produce here, which is then procured by wholesale dealers. This facility is provided by the provincial government of Karnataka.

== Landmarks ==
The village has a fairly large square where the city buses make the return journey. There is one primary school, and the steps to the Jwalamuki temple start from the square. The village is populated by farmers. The village square has one grocery, one bakery, one teashop and ten other small shops.

=== Jwalamukhi temple ===
The Jwalamuki Tripurasundhari temple is situated on a hillock in the middle of the village square. Durga is worshipped here and the temple is visited every day by devotees. The temple and the village is located on the base of the Chamundi Hill in Mysore.

=== Osho Sannidhi ===
The Osho Meditation Center in Uthanahalli is about six km from Mysore. The ashram is situated in the middle of a large expanse of paddy fields. The center is about one km from the village square. The Osho center conducts three day yoga camps and there is a lot of cottages for visitors.
