= H. D. Kumaraswamy =

Indian politician and film producer (born 1959)

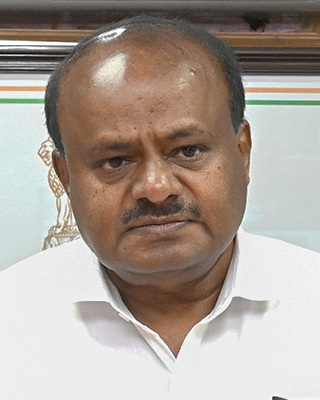
- Kumaraswamy in 2024

Union Minister of Heavy Industries
- Incumbent
- Assumed office 10 June 2024
- President: Droupadi Murmu
- Prime Minister: Narendra Modi
- Preceded by: Mahendra Nath Pandey

Union Minister of Steel
- Incumbent
- Assumed office 10 June 2024
- President: Droupadi Murmu
- Prime Minister: Narendra Modi
- Preceded by: Jyotiraditya Scindia

12th Chief Minister of Karnataka
- In office 23 May 2018 – 23 July 2019
- Deputy: G. Parameshwara
- Preceded by: B. S. Yediyurappa
- Succeeded by: B. S. Yediyurappa
- In office 3 February 2006 – 9 October 2007
- Deputy: B. S. Yediyurappa
- Preceded by: Dharam Singh
- Succeeded by: President's rule

19th Leader of the Opposition in Karnataka Legislative Assembly
- In office 31 May 2013 – 22 January 2014
- Chief Minister: Siddaramaiah
- Preceded by: Siddaramaiah
- Succeeded by: Jagadish Shettar

Member of Karnataka Legislative Assembly
- In office 16 May 2018 – 4 June 2024
- Preceded by: C. P. Yogeeshwara
- Constituency: Channapatna
- In office 2013–2018
- Preceded by: K. Raju
- Succeeded by: Anitha Kumaraswamy
- Constituency: Ramanagara
- In office 13 May 2004 – 16 May 2009
- Preceded by: C. M. Lingappa
- Succeeded by: K. Raju
- Constituency: Ramanagara

Member of Parliament, Lok Sabha
- Incumbent
- Assumed office 4 June 2024
- Preceded by: Sumalatha
- Constituency: Mandya, Karnataka
- In office 16 May 2009 – 2013
- Preceded by: Tejashwini Gowda (as MP for Kanakapura)
- Succeeded by: D. K. Suresh
- Constituency: Bangalore Rural, Karnataka
- In office 9 May 1996 – 4 March 1998
- Preceded by: M. V. Chandrashekara Murthy
- Succeeded by: M. Srinivas
- Constituency: Kanakapura, Karnataka

Chairman of Janata Dal (Secular), Karnataka
- Incumbent
- Assumed office 20 October 2023
- In office 2014–2018
- In office 2008–2013

Personal details
- Born: Haradanahalli Deve Gowda Kumaraswamy; 16 December 1959 (age 66) Haradanahalli, Mysore State, India
- Party: Janata Dal (Secular)
- Other political affiliations: Janata Dal
- Spouses: Anitha Kumaraswamy (m. 1985); Radhika Kumaraswamy (m. 2007)
- Children: 2, including Nikhil Kumar
- Parents: H. D. Deve Gowda (father); Chennamma Deve Gowda (mother)
- Relatives: H. D. Revanna (brother); Prajwal Revanna (nephew)
- Education: B.Sc., National College Basavanagudi, Bangalore
- Profession: Politician; Film producer
- Nickname(s): HDK, Kumaranna

Haradanahalli Devegowda Kumaraswamy (born 16 December 1959) is an Indian politician and film producer who is serving as the 21st Minister of Heavy Industries and 14th Minister of Steel of India since 2024. He also served as the 12th Chief Minister of Karnataka from 2018 to 2019 and previously from 2006 to 2007. He was also the leader of the opposition in the Karnataka Legislative Assembly from 2013 to 2014. He is currently the president of the Karnataka State Janata Dal (Secular). He is a member of Lok Sabha, having been elected from Mandya and the former member of the Karnataka Legislative Assembly from Channapatna from 2018 to 2024, Ramanagara from 2004 to 2009 and from 2013 to 2018. He is the son of former Chief Minister of Karnataka & Prime Minister of India H. D. Deve Gowda.

== Early life and education ==
Kumaraswamy was born in Haradanahalli, Holenarasipura taluk of Hassan district, Karnataka to H. D. Deve Gowda and Chennamma.

He completed primary education in a government school in Hassan district. He finished his high school studies in Bangalore's MES Educational Institution in Jayanagar and Bachelor of Science degree from National College Basavanagudi, Bangalore.

== Personal life ==
On 13 March 1985, Kumaraswamy married Anitha Kumaraswamy. They have a son, Nikhil Kumaraswamy.

In November 2010, Radhika revealed that she was married to Kumaraswamy and that they have a daughter named Shamika. They separated in 2015.

== Political career ==
Kumaraswamy entered politics by winning from Kanakapura (in Ramanagara District) in the 1996 general elections. He sought re-election from Kanakapura in 1998 and lost to M. V. Chandrashekara Murthy. This was Kumaraswamy's worst defeat ever where he lost by such a margin that he even forfeited his deposit.

He again contested unsuccessfully for a Sathanur assembly seat in 1999 when he was defeated by congress heavyweight D. K. Shivakumar. In 2004, he was elected to represent the Ramanagara assembly segment. When the 2004 state elections resulted in a hung assembly with no party getting enough seats to form a government, the Indian National Congress and Janata Dal (Secular) (JD(S)) parties decided to come together and form a coalition government. Known for his adaptability and friendly nature, Dharam Singh of the Congress was the unanimous choice of both parties to head the government. He was sworn in as chief minister on 28 May 2004. Forty-two MLAs of Janata Dal (Secular) under Kumaraswamy's leadership left the coalition and the government collapsed. On 28 January 2006, Karnataka Governor T. N. Chaturvedi invited Kumaraswamy to form the government in the state after the resignation of the Congress Government led by Dharam Singh.

== Chief Minister ==
He was Chief Minister of Karnataka from 4 February 2006 to 9 October 2007. On 27 September 2007, Kumaraswamy said that he would leave office on 3 October as part of a power-sharing agreement between the Janata Dal (Secular) and the Bharatiya Janata Party (BJP), despite the calls of some legislators in the JD(S) for him to remain in office for the time being, due to complications in arranging the transfer of power. However, on 4 October 2007, he refused to transfer power to the BJP. Finally, on 8 October 2007, he tendered his resignation to Governor, and the state was put under President's rule two days later. However, he reconciled later and decided to offer support to the BJP. BJP's B. S. Yeddyurappa was sworn in as the Chief Minister of Karnataka on 12 November 2007. But, again refused to support BJP government over a disagreement on sharing of ministries which resulted in Yeddyurappa resignation as Chief Minister on 19 November 2007.

After the untimely demise of Karnataka state JD(S) President Merajuddin Patel, he was elected unopposed as President of the state unit.

However, after the by-election results of Bangalore Rural Lok Sabha constituency and Mandya in which his party candidates lost, he resigned from the post of President of the Janata Dal (Secular) State unit, and as leader of the opposition.

However, party cadres succeeded in convincing him not to quit as leader of opposition in the Karnataka Assembly. In September 2013, A. Krishnappa was selected as Janata Dal-Secular's president for Karnataka, filling the vacancy left by Kumaraswamy.

In November 2014 Kumaraswamy was elected as Karnataka state Janata Dal (Secular) President. Kumaraswamy is also known for accusing political rivals of corruption.

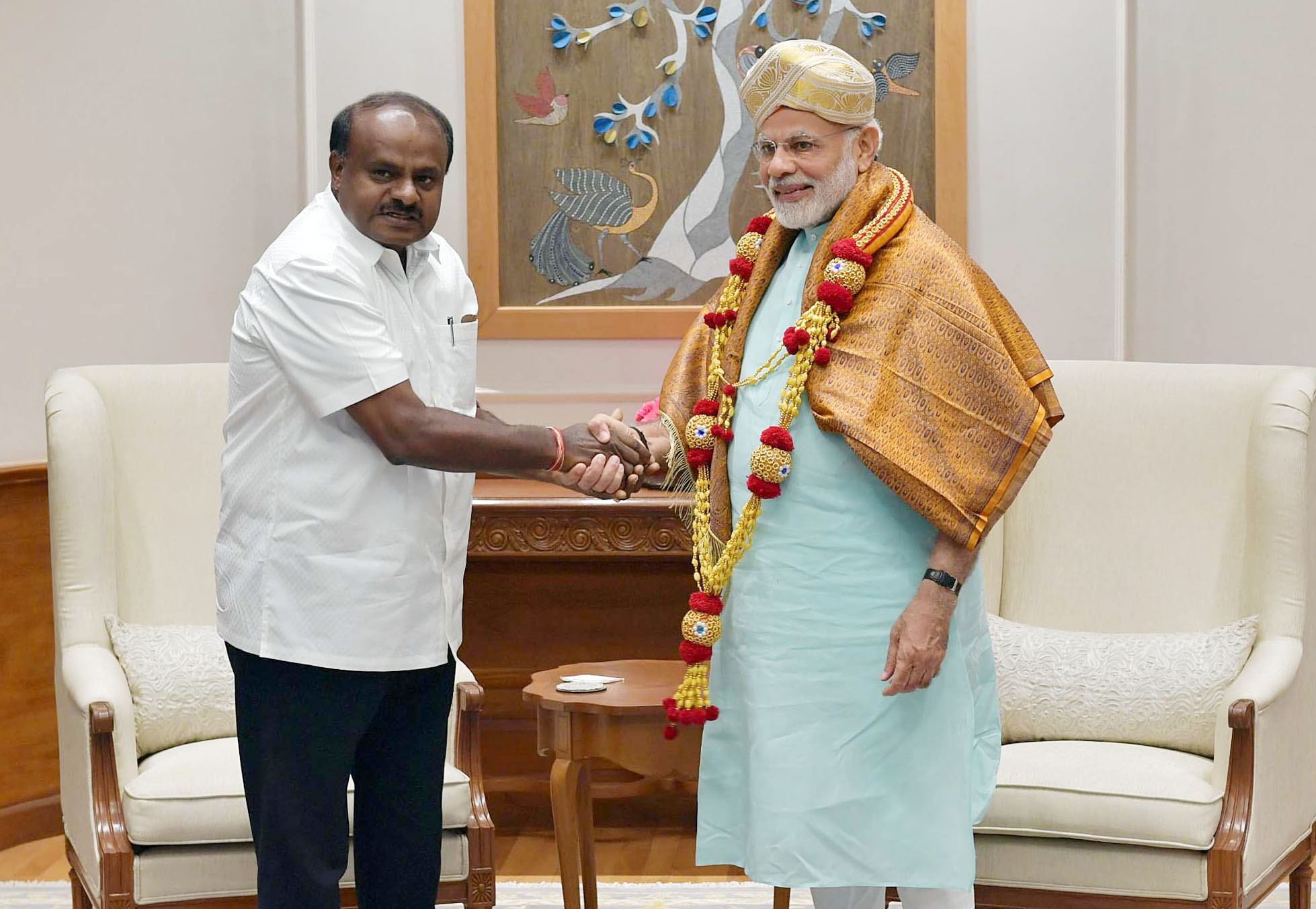
Kumaraswamy met Prime Minister Narendra Modi after becoming Chief Minister in May 2018

In the 2018 elections in Karnataka state, JD(S) was the third-largest party but after a post-poll alliance with the Rahul Gandhi led Indian National Congress, he was sworn in as the Chief Minister on 23 May 2018.

In the 2019 parliament elections, his son Nikhil Gowda contested in the Mandya (Lok Sabha constituency) against an independent candidate Sumalatha, wife of film actor Late Ambareesh. Kumaraswamy took this contest as a prestige and campaigned all across the constituency. In vain his son lost the election by a margin of 1,30,000 odd votes. This was a major setback and abashment to Kumaraswamy in his political career. He also shed tears in a party convention in Mandya, recalling the election loss faced by his son.

In July 2019, his government lost its majority when 13 MLAs of Congress and 3 MLAs of his own party resigned to their MLA Posts. BSP MLA Mahesh N & 2 Independent MLAs withdrew their support for H.D.Kumaraswamy led coalition Government in Karnataka. On 23 July Kumaraswamy lost his majority in Karnataka floor test. Kumaraswamy resigned to the Chief Minister post, by submitting his resignation letter to governor Vajubhai Vala on 23 July 2019. Then BJP was invited to form the government as the single largest party, by the governor and B. S.Yediyurappa took oath as the Chief Minister of Karnataka by succeeding him.

In the 2023 Karnataka Assembly Elections, he won from Channapatna against BJP's C. P. Yogeshwar by a margin of 20,000 votes, while his son Nikhil lost in his previous constituency, Ramanagara to the Congress candidate. His party JD(S) managed to win 19 seats of the contested 204 seats in the same elections.

== positions held ==
=== Positions held ===
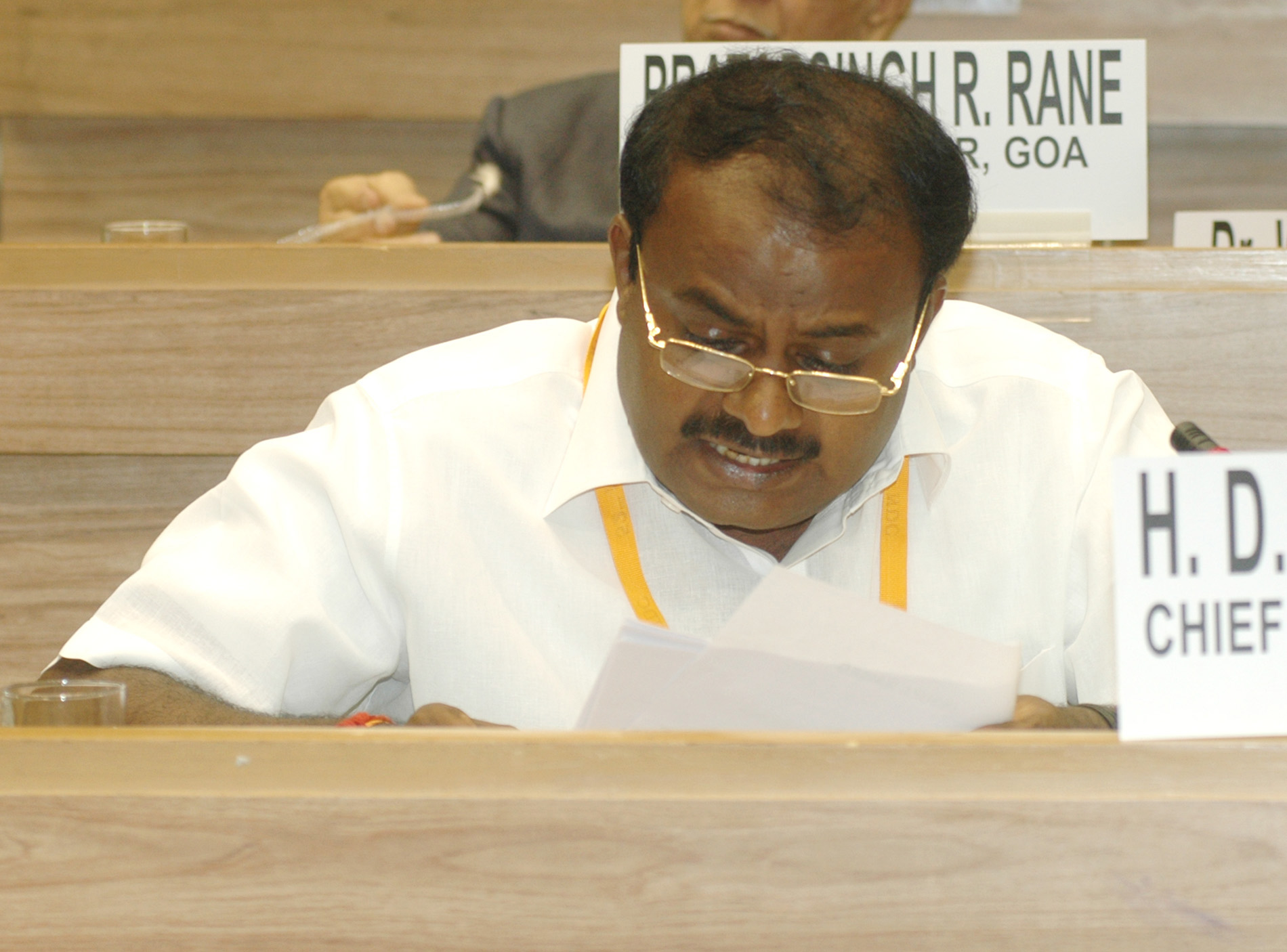
Kumaraswamy in December 2006

Source :

Year	Position
1996	Member, 11th Lok Sabha (Kanakapura)
2004–08	Member, Karnataka Legislative Assembly Chief Minister of Karnataka (3 February 2006 – 9 October 2007)
2009-13	Member, 15th Lok Sabha: 31 August 2009: Member, Committee on Rural Development; 15 October 2009: Member, Committee on Food Management in Parliament House Complex
2013–24	Member, Karnataka Legislative Assembly
2018 – 19	Member, Karnataka Legislative Assembly Chief Minister of Karnataka (23 May 2018 – 23 July 2019)
2024–present	Member, 18th Lok Sabha (Mandya) Union Minister of Heavy Industries Union Minister of Steel

== Electoral performance ==
=== Lok Sabha ===
Year	Constituency	Party	Votes	%	Opponent		Votes	%	Result	Margin
1996	Kanakapura	JD	440,444	42.11	INC	M. V. Chandrasekhara Murthy	333,040	31.84	Won	107,404
1998	Kanakapura	JD	260,859	21.63	BJP	M. Srinivas	470,387	39.00	Lost	—209,528
1999	Kanakapura	JD(S)	162,448	13.17	INC	M. V. Chandrasekhara Murthy	532,910	43.19	Lost	—370,462
2009	Bangalore Rural	JD(S)	493,302	44.73	BJP	C. P. Yogeeshwara	363,027	32.92	Won	130,275
2014	Chikballapur	JD(S)	346,339	27.40	INC	M. Veerappa Moily	424,800	33.61	Lost	—78,461
2024	Mandya	JD(S)	851,881	58.34	INC	Venkataramane Gowda	567,261	38.85	Won	284,620

=== Karnataka Legislative Assembly ===
Year	Constituency	Party	Votes	%	Opponent	Opponent Party	Opponent Votes	%	Result	Margin	%
2023	Channapatna	JD(S)	96,592	48.83	C. P. Yogeshwara	BJP	80,677	40.79	Won	15,915	8.04
2018	Channapatna	JD(S)	87,995	46.55	C. P. Yogeshwara	BJP	66,465	35.16	Won	21,530	11.39
2018	Ramanagara	JD(S)	92,626	53.96	H. A. Iqbal Hussain	INC	69,990	40.77	Won	22,636	13.19
2013	Ramanagara	JD(S)	83,238	56.12	Maridevaru	INC	58,049	39.04	Won	25,189	17.08
2008	Ramanagara	JD(S)	71,633	56.09	M. Rudresha	BJP	24,428	19.12	Won	47,205	36.97
2004	Ramanagara	JD(S)	69,554	54.14	Lingappa C. M.	INC	44,638	34.75	Won	24,916	19.39
1999	Sathanur	JD(S)	41,663	40.61	D. K. Shivakumar	INC	56,050	54.64	Lost	—14,387	-14.03

== Film and television ==
Kumaraswamy is into film production and distribution. He has produced several Kannada films including Chandra Chakori, a huge hit, credited with 365 day-run in theaters. Surya Vamsha which was directed by S. Narayan was the debut movie produced by Kumaraswamy under Chennambika films, named after his mother. In 2016 his banner also produced his son's debut movie Jaguar (2016 film) and his 2nd movie Seetharama Kalyana in 2019.

- Premotsava (1999)
- Surya Vamsha (2000)
- Galate Aliyandru (2001)
- Jithendra (2002)
- Chandra Chakori (2003)
- Jaguar (2016)
- Seetharama Kalyana (2019)

In September 2007, Kumaraswamy started the Kannada television channel Kasturi. The channel is now owned and managed by his wife Anitha.

== Controversies ==
=== Bigamy charges ===
Kumaraswamy was accused of bigamy which is illegal according to Hindu Marriage Act, 1955 of India. A public interest litigation was filed after media reports of his marriage to Kannada cinema actress Radhika Kumaraswamy surfaced. Since Kumaraswamy is married to his first wife Anitha, his second marriage with Radhika is a violation of law. However a division bench of Karnataka High Court headed by Chief Justice Vikramajit Sen dismissed the case citing "lack of proof".

=== Janthakal mining scam ===
Kumaraswamy and his wife Anitha are facing charges in the Janthakal mining scam. He is accused of pressuring a senior bureaucrat to renew Janthakal Enterprise's lease of iron ore mining for 40 years on the basis of forged documents and violating several rules. The bureaucrat, Ganga Ram Baderiya, was allegedly given kickbacks by Janthakal Enterprise. The owner of Janthakal Enterprises, mining baron Vinod Goel, was arrested in 2015 on charges of forgery. A Special Investigation Team (SIT) is probing this scam on the direction of Supreme Court of India.

=== Vishwabharati case ===
Kumaraswamy and his wife Anitha are accused of misuse of official position in allotment of 80 acres of land to Vishwabharati House Building Cooperative Society Ltd, a private cooperative society, which later made a quid pro quo site allotment to Anitha, during Kumaraswamy's tenure as Chief Minister in 2006.

=== Release of CD on Mangalore protests ===
Kumaraswamy called for a press meet and released a CD containing 35 video clips of the violence during the Mangalore protests against the CAA. The video presented the policemen acting violently against the protesters and beating up the civilians of the city, leading to riots in the city. He accused that the police directly followed the government orders inhumanly and were the main reason for the shoot out that killed 2 people during the protests.

The BJP in return accused that these video clips are all edited versions of older footages of some other circumstances. They also said that Kumaraswamy is misleading the people by producing inappropriate footages in public that provokes confusion and violence among the people. The BJP included saying that Kumaraswamy, being a senior politician in the state is directly accusing the government officials and the police, which is unacceptable.

=== Statements on RSS ===
In February 2023, Kumarswamy said that a secret meet of RSS in Delhi, has decide to make a Brahmin, Pralhad Joshi, the next chief minister of Karnataka. This led to vast opposition from the BJP and also the Brahmin's Mahasabha, asking for an apology for these statements.

=== Stealing electricity from BESCOM ===
In November 2023, Kumaraswamy was accused of stealing electricity from BESCOM to light his home in J P Nagar, Bengaluru during Deepavali festival. Kumaraswamy was fined ₹ 68,526 for stealing electric power. Kumaraswamy was also booked under Section 135 of Indian Electricity Act.

== See also ==
- Third Modi ministry

Lok Sabha
Preceded by M. V. Chandrashekara Murthy	Member of Parliament for Kanakapura; 1996–1998	Succeeded by M. Srinivas
New constituency	Member of Parliament for Bangalore Rural; 2009–2013	Succeeded by D. K. Suresh
Karnataka Legislative Assembly
Preceded by K. Raju	Member of the Legislative Assembly for Ramanagara; 2004–2009	Succeeded by Anitha Kumaraswamy
Preceded by C. M. Lingappa	Member of the Legislative Assembly for Ramanagara; 2013–2018	Succeeded by K. Raju
Preceded by C. P. Yogeeshwara	Member of the Legislative Assembly for Channapatna; 2018–present	Incumbent
Political offices
Preceded by Dharam Singh	Chief Minister of Karnataka; 2006–2007	Succeeded by B. S. Yeddyurappa
Preceded by Siddaramaiah	Leader of the Opposition of Karnataka; 2013–2014	Succeeded by Jagadish Shettar
Preceded by B. S. Yeddyurappa	Chief Minister of Karnataka; 2018–2019	Succeeded by B. S. Yeddyurappa
