= M. V. Rajasekharan =

Indian politician (1928–2020)

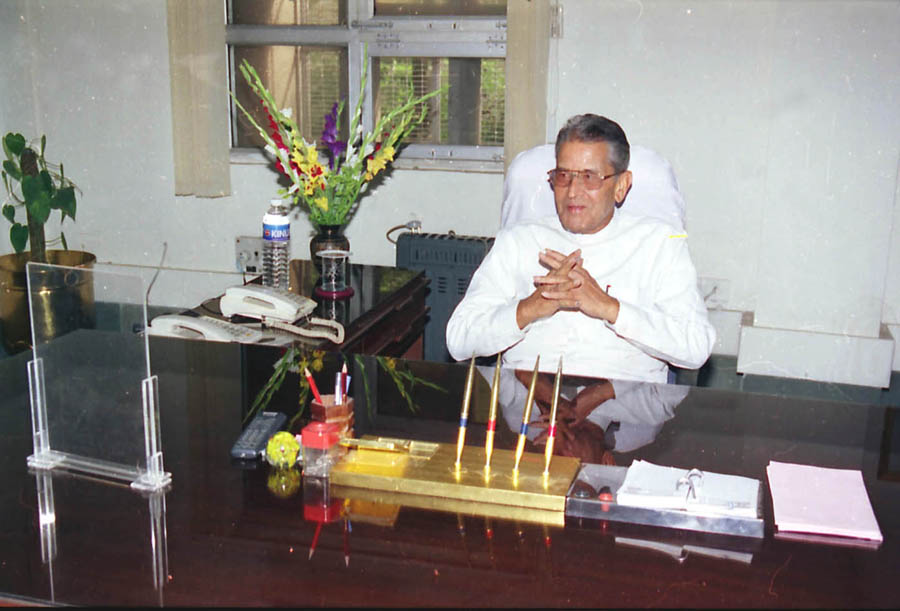
- Rajashekharan in 2004

Minister of State of Planning Government of India
- In office 23 May 2004 – 6 April 2008
- Prime Minister: Manmohan Singh
- Succeeded by: V. Narayanasamy

Member of Parliament Rajya Sabha
- In office 2002–2008
- Constituency: Karnataka

Member of Parliament Lok Sabha
- In office 1967–1971
- Succeeded by: C. K. Jaffer Sheriff
- Constituency: Kanakapura

Member of Karnataka Legislative Council
- In office 2008–2014
- Constituency: Elected by MLAs

Personal details
- Born: 12 September 1928
- Died: 13 April 2020 (aged 91) Bangalore, Karnataka, India
- Party: Indian National Congress
- Spouse: Girija Rajashekaran
- Children: 4

Shri M.V. Rajasekharan (12 September 1928 – 13 April 2020) was a politician from the Indian National Congress party and a member of the Legislative Council Karnataka in the upper house of the Government of Karnataka. He was also the Minister of State for Planning, Government of India.
