= Kanakapura Assembly constituency =

Legislative Assembly constituency in Karnataka, India

Coordinates: 12.55°N 77.42°E

Kanakapura
- Constituency No. 184 for the Karnataka Legislative Assembly

Constituency details
- Country: India
- Region: South India
- State: Karnataka
- District: Bengaluru South
- Lok Sabha constituency: Bangalore Rural
- Established: 1951
- Total electors: 224,987 (2023)
- Reservation: None

Member of Legislative Assembly
- 16th Karnataka Legislative Assembly
- Incumbent D. K. Shivakumar; Chief Minister of Karnataka
- Party: Indian National Congress
- Elected year: 2023
- Preceded by: P. G. R. Sindhia

Kanakapura Assembly constituency is one of the 224 assembly constituencies in Karnataka state in India.

== Members of the Legislative Assembly ==
Year	Member	Political party
1952	K. G. Thimme Gowda	Indian National Congress
1957	M. Linge Gowda	Praja Socialist Party
1962	S. Kariyappa	Independent politician
1967	K. G. Thimme Gowda	Indian National Congress
1972	S. Kariyappa	Indian National Congress
1978	C. Appaji	Indian National Congress
1983	P. G. R. Sindhia	Janata Party
1983^	Ramakrishna Hegde	Janata Party
1985	P. G. R. Sindhia	Janata Party
1989	P. G. R. Sindhia	Janata Dal
1994	P. G. R. Sindhia	Janata Dal
1999	P. G. R. Sindhia	Janata Dal (United)
2004	P. G. R. Sindhia	Janata Dal (Secular)
2008	D. K. Shivakumar	Indian National Congress
2013	D. K. Shivakumar	Indian National Congress
2018	D. K. Shivakumar	Indian National Congress
2023	D. K. Shivakumar	Indian National Congress

^ indicates By-election

== Election results ==
=== Assembly Election 2023 ===
2023 Karnataka Legislative Assembly election : Kanakapura
Party	Candidate	Votes	%	±%
INC	D. K. Shivakumar	143,023	75.03	▲6.51
JD(S)	B. Nagaraju	20,631	10.82	▼14.77
BJP	R. Ashoka	19,753	10.36	▲6.99
UPP	K. N. Manmohan Raj	1,258	0.66	New
AAP	E. Puttaraju	1,144	0.60	New
NOTA	None of the above	762	0.40	▼0.23
Margin of victory		122,392	64.21	▲21.28
Turnout		191,323	85.04	▲1.31
Total valid votes		190,623		
Registered electors		224,987		▲1.07
INC hold		Swing	▲6.51	

=== Assembly Election 2018 ===
2018 Karnataka Legislative Assembly election : Kanakapura
Party	Candidate	Votes	%	±%
INC	D. K. Shivakumar	127,552	68.52	▲9.17
JD(S)	Narayana Gowda	47,643	25.59	▼15.11
BJP	Nandini Gowda	6,273	3.37	▲2.30
NOTA	None of the above	1,168	0.63	New
Margin of victory		79,909	42.93	▲24.28
Turnout		186,384	83.73	▲0.10
Total valid votes		186,152		
Registered electors		222,602		▲5.49
INC hold		Swing	▲9.17	

=== Assembly Election 2013 ===
2013 Karnataka Legislative Assembly election : Kanakapura
Party	Candidate	Votes	%	±%
INC	D. K. Shivakumar	100,007	59.35	▲11.01
JD(S)	P. G. R. Sindhia	68,583	40.70	▼2.54
BJP	B. Nagaraju	1,807	1.07	▼1.30
BSP	Mallikarjunaiah	1,345	0.80	▼1.22
Margin of victory		31,424	18.65	▲13.55
Turnout		176,479	83.63	▲7.40
Total valid votes		168,511		
Registered electors		211,011		▲14.15
INC hold		Swing	▲11.01	

=== Assembly Election 2008 ===
2008 Karnataka Legislative Assembly election : Kanakapura
Party	Candidate	Votes	%	±%
INC	D. K. Shivakumar	68,096	48.34	▲8.37
JD(S)	D. M. Vishwanath	60,917	43.24	▼4.90
BJP	S. M. Hampaiah	3,340	2.37	▼2.47
BSP	Chinnaswamy	2,845	2.02	▼1.94
Independent	H. M. Shivakumar	1,582	1.12	New
Independent	S. S. Shankar	1,216	0.86	New
Independent	K. V. Vishwanath	932	0.66	New
Margin of victory		7,179	5.10	▼3.07
Turnout		140,916	76.23	▲10.46
Total valid votes		140,873		
Registered electors		184,852		▲10.90
INC gain from JD(S)		Swing	▲0.20	

=== Assembly Election 2004 ===
2004 Karnataka Legislative Assembly election : Kanakapura
Party	Candidate	Votes	%	±%
JD(S)	P. G. R. Sindhia	52,740	48.14	▲23.61
INC	Narayana Gowda	43,791	39.97	▲16.22
BJP	B. Nagaraju	5,307	4.84	New
BSP	Chinnaswamy	4,340	3.96	New
Kannada Nadu Party	T. Durgaiah	1,182	1.08	New
All India Forward Bloc (Subhasist)	Suvarnamma	1,099	1.00	New
Independent	Ravikumar	1,088	0.99	New
Margin of victory		8,949	8.17	▼15.65
Turnout		109,620	65.77	▼7.84
Total valid votes		109,547		
Registered electors		166,680		▲16.66
JD(S) gain from JD(U)		Swing	▼0.22	

=== Assembly Election 1999 ===
1999 Karnataka Legislative Assembly election : Kanakapura
Party	Candidate	Votes	%	±%
JD(U)	P. G. R. Sindhia	48,164	48.36	New
JD(S)	Narayana Gowda	24,436	24.53	New
INC	Marilinge Gowda	23,653	23.75	▲3.61
Satyayug Party	T. Durgaiah	2,764	2.77	New
Margin of victory		23,728	23.82	▼26.63
Turnout		105,175	73.61	▼0.91
Total valid votes		99,604		
Rejected ballots		5,475	5.21	▲3.81
Registered electors		142,882		▲8.08
JD(U) gain from JD		Swing	▼22.22	

=== Assembly Election 1994 ===
1994 Karnataka Legislative Assembly election : Kanakapura
Party	Candidate	Votes	%	±%
JD	P. G. R. Sindhia	68,561	70.58	▲29.88
INC	K. T. Channabasavegowda	19,559	20.14	▼15.71
BJP	L. Puttamadaiah	5,017	5.16	New
BSP	Sampangiramaiah	901	0.93	New
INC	C. Bharathi	742	0.76	New
Independent	C. Shivashankara	658	0.68	New
Margin of victory		49,002	50.45	▲45.59
Turnout		98,514	74.52	▼4.52
Total valid votes		97,137		
Rejected ballots		1,377	1.40	▼2.51
Registered electors		132,202		▲11.63
JD hold		Swing	▲29.88	

=== Assembly Election 1989 ===
1989 Karnataka Legislative Assembly election : Kanakapura
Party	Candidate	Votes	%	±%
JD	P. G. R. Sindhia	36,614	40.70	New
INC	Marilinge Gowda	32,245	35.85	▲3.02
JP	H. D. Devegowda	20,224	22.48	New
Margin of victory		4,369	4.86	▼28.71
Turnout		93,608	79.04	▼2.01
Total valid votes		89,952		
Rejected ballots		3,656	3.91	▲2.97
Registered electors		118,426		▲17.65
JD gain from JP		Swing	▼25.70	

=== Assembly Election 1985 ===
1985 Karnataka Legislative Assembly election : Kanakapura
Party	Candidate	Votes	%	±%
JP	P. G. R. Sindhia	53,669	66.40	▲7.94
INC	M. V. Rajashekaran	26,534	32.83	▼5.56
Margin of victory		27,135	33.57	▲13.50
Turnout		81,586	81.05	▲4.56
Total valid votes		80,822		
Rejected ballots		764	0.94	▼0.90
Registered electors		100,661		▲17.92
JP hold		Swing	▲7.94	

=== Assembly Election 1983 ===
1983 Karnataka Legislative Assembly election : Kanakapura
Party	Candidate	Votes	%	±%
JP	P. G. R. Sindhia	37,467	58.46	▲13.13
INC	C. Appaji	24,603	38.39	▲34.45
INC(J)	B. Basavaiah	1,020	1.59	New
BJP	P. R. Anantha Swamy	999	1.56	New
Margin of victory		12,864	20.07	▲14.66
Turnout		65,293	76.49	▼5.81
Total valid votes		64,089		
Rejected ballots		1,204	1.84	▼0.50
Registered electors		85,363		▲12.71
JP gain from INC(I)		Swing	▲7.72	

=== Assembly Election 1978 ===
1978 Karnataka Legislative Assembly election : Kanakapura
Party	Candidate	Votes	%	±%
INC(I)	C. Appaji	30,883	50.74	New
JP	Srinivasa Murthy. K. G	27,590	45.33	New
INC	Cabbedi Kagegowda Mallaiah	2,397	3.94	▼62.80
Margin of victory		3,293	5.41	▼28.08
Turnout		62,327	82.30	▲18.30
Total valid votes		60,870		
Rejected ballots		1,457	2.34	▲2.34
Registered electors		75,735		▲25.60
INC(I) gain from INC		Swing	▼16.00	

=== Assembly Election 1972 ===
1972 Mysore State Legislative Assembly election : Kanakapura
Party	Candidate	Votes	%	±%
INC	S. Kariyappa	25,121	66.74	▲11.86
INC(O)	K. G. Srinivasmurthy	12,517	33.26	New
Margin of victory		12,604	33.49	▲23.73
Turnout		38,591	64.00	▼12.07
Total valid votes		37,638		
Registered electors		60,299		▲21.19
INC hold		Swing	▲11.86	

=== Assembly Election 1967 ===
1967 Mysore State Legislative Assembly election : Kanakapura
Party	Candidate	Votes	%	±%
INC	K. G. Thimme Gowda	20,115	54.88	▲6.84
Independent	S. Kariyappa	16,539	45.12	New
Margin of victory		3,576	9.76	▲5.83
Turnout		37,850	76.07	▼1.15
Total valid votes		36,654		
Registered electors		49,756		▼7.93
INC gain from Independent		Swing	▲2.92	

=== Assembly Election 1962 ===
1962 Mysore State Legislative Assembly election : Kanakapura
Party	Candidate	Votes	%	±%
Independent	S. Kariyappa	21,085	51.96	New
INC	K. G. Thimme Gowda	19,492	48.04	▲10.80
Margin of victory		1,593	3.93	▼9.61
Turnout		41,730	77.22	▲11.90
Total valid votes		40,577		
Registered electors		54,041		▲14.73
Independent gain from PSP		Swing	▲1.18	

=== Assembly Election 1957 ===
1957 Mysore State Legislative Assembly election : Kanakapura
Party	Candidate	Votes	%	±%
PSP	M. Linge Gowda	15,624	50.78	New
INC	K. G. Thimme Gowda	11,459	37.24	▼17.83
ABJS	C. M. Mahadevaiah	2,065	6.71	New
Independent	K. P. Malleshan Alias Malleshaiah	1,620	5.27	New
Margin of victory		4,165	13.54	▲3.40
Turnout		30,768	65.32	▲4.87
Total valid votes		30,768		
Registered electors		47,104		▼7.15
PSP gain from INC		Swing	▼4.29	

=== Assembly Election 1952 ===
1952 Mysore State Legislative Assembly election : Kankanhalli
Party	Candidate	Votes	%	±%
INC	K. G. Thimme Gowda	16,888	55.07	New
KMPP	M. Linge Gowda	13,778	44.93	New
Margin of victory		3,110	10.14	
Turnout		30,666	60.45	
Total valid votes		30,666		
Registered electors		50,733		
INC win (new seat)				
