= Sathanur Assembly constituency =

Former constituency in Karnataka, India

Coordinates: 13.126°N 77.633°E

Sathanur
- Former constituency for the Karnataka Legislative Assembly

Constituency details
- Country: India
- Region: South India
- State: Karnataka
- Lok Sabha constituency: Kanakapura
- Established: 1967
- Abolished: 2008
- Reservation: None

Sathanur Assembly constituency was one of the constituencies in Karnataka Legislative Assembly in India. It was part of Kanakapura Lok Sabha constituency. After the 2008 delimitation of seats, both the assembly and parliament seats became defunct.

== Members of the Legislative Assembly ==
Election	Member	Party
1967	H. Puttadasa	Independent politician
1972	H. Puttadasa	Indian National Congress
1978	K. L. Shivalinge Gowda	Janata Party
1983	K. G. Srinivasa Murthy	Janata Party
1985	H. D. Deve Gowda	Janata Party
1985^ (Note: Due to Resignation of H. D. Deve Gowda)	K. L. Shivalinge Gowda	Janata Party
1989	D. K. Shivakumar	Indian National Congress
1994	D. K. Shivakumar	Independent politician
1999	D. K. Shivakumar	Indian National Congress
2004	D. K. Shivakumar	Indian National Congress

== Election results ==
=== Assembly Election 2004 ===
2004 Karnataka Legislative Assembly election : Sathanur
Party	Candidate	Votes	%	±%
INC	D. K. Shivakumar	51,603	47.91%	▼6.73
JD(S)	Vishwanath. D. M	37,675	34.98%	▼5.63
BSP	Muniyappa	8,814	8.18%	▲7.26
BJP	U. K. Swamy	6,931	6.43%	▲2.60
Independent	Swamy. K. N	1,035	0.96%	New
Margin of victory		13,928	12.93%	▼1.09
Turnout		107,709	67.69%	▼8.27
Total valid votes		107,708		
Registered electors		159,115		▲14.86
INC hold		Swing	▼6.73	

=== Assembly Election 1999 ===
1999 Karnataka Legislative Assembly election : Sathanur
Party	Candidate	Votes	%	±%
INC	D. K. Shivakumar	56,050	54.64%	▲51.02
JD(S)	H. D. Kumaraswamy	41,663	40.61%	New
BJP	H. R. Basavaraju	3,934	3.83%	▲2.24
BSP	Cheluvaiah	939	0.92%	▲0.11
Margin of victory		14,387	14.02%	▲13.48
Turnout		105,229	75.96%	▼5.18
Total valid votes		102,586		
Rejected ballots		2,640	2.51%	▲1.41
Registered electors		138,535		▲6.14
INC gain from Independent		Swing	▲8.56	

=== Assembly Election 1994 ===
1994 Karnataka Legislative Assembly election : Sathanur
Party	Candidate	Votes	%	±%
Independent	D. K. Shivakumar	48,270	46.08%	New
JD	U. K. Swamy	47,702	45.54%	▲33.31
INC	B. Ramesh	3,794	3.62%	▼46.15
BJP	K. Krishnappa	1,666	1.59%	New
Kannada Desha Party	Ashok	1,385	1.32%	New
BSP	Mellesha	847	0.81%	New
Margin of victory		568	0.54%	▼14.69
Turnout		105,909	81.14%	▲2.14
Total valid votes		104,743		
Rejected ballots		1,166	1.10%	▼2.25
Registered electors		130,527		▲11.21
Independent gain from INC		Swing	▼3.69	

=== Assembly Election 1989 ===
1989 Karnataka Legislative Assembly election : Sathanur
Party	Candidate	Votes	%	±%
INC	D. K. Shivakumar	44,595	49.77%	▲13.51
JP	U. K. Swamy	30,945	34.53%	New
JD	K. S. Sudhakar	10,957	12.23%	New
Kranti Sabha	Durgaiah. T. M	2,029	2.26%	New
Margin of victory		13,650	15.23%	▼10.22
Turnout		92,714	79.00%	
Total valid votes		89,608		
Rejected ballots		3,106	3.35%	
Registered electors		117,366		
INC gain from JP		Swing	▼11.95	

=== Assembly By-election 1985 ===
1985 Karnataka Legislative Assembly by-election : Sathanur
Party	Candidate	Votes	%	±%
JP	K. L. Shivalinge Gowda	45,608	61.72%	▲2.39
INC	Marilingaiah	26,797	36.26%	▼2.52
Independent	S. Veerabhadraiah	486	0.66%	New
Margin of victory		18,811	25.45%	▲4.89
Total valid votes		73,900		
JP hold		Swing	▲2.39	

=== Assembly Election 1985 ===
1985 Karnataka Legislative Assembly election : Sathanur
Party	Candidate	Votes	%	±%
JP	H. D. Deve Gowda	45,612	59.33%	▼2.27
INC	D. K. Shivakumar	29,809	38.78%	▲3.91
LKD	Mallikarjunaiah	893	1.16%	New
Margin of victory		15,803	20.56%	▼6.17
Turnout		77,683	80.88%	▲6.50
Total valid votes		76,873		
Rejected ballots		810	1.04%	▼0.77
Registered electors		96,043		▲11.58
JP hold		Swing	▼2.27	

=== Assembly Election 1983 ===
1983 Karnataka Legislative Assembly election : Sathanur
Party	Candidate	Votes	%	±%
JP	K. G. Srinivasa Murthy	38,723	61.60%	▲14.70
INC	V. C. Siyaramu	21,921	34.87%	▲32.19
Independent	M. Ramaiah	798	1.27%	New
Independent	K. P. Mallesham	788	1.25%	New
Independent	H. M. Ramaswamy	452	0.72%	New
Margin of victory		16,802	26.73%	▲26.08
Turnout		64,023	74.38%	▼7.22
Total valid votes		62,864		
Rejected ballots		1,159	1.81%	▼0.59
Registered electors		86,076		▲9.94
JP hold		Swing	▲14.70	

=== Assembly Election 1978 ===
1978 Karnataka Legislative Assembly election : Sathanur
Party	Candidate	Votes	%	±%
JP	K. L. Shivalinge Gowda	29,243	46.90%	New
INC(I)	Kariappa. S	28,840	46.25%	New
INC	Govinda Rao. N	1,672	2.68%	▼67.94
Independent	K. P. Mallesham	1,400	2.25%	New
Independent	H. A. Ramachandra Gowda	619	0.99%	New
Independent	M. Ramaswamy	582	0.93%	New
Margin of victory		403	0.65%	▼40.58
Turnout		63,889	81.60%	▲22.84
Total valid votes		62,356		
Rejected ballots		1,533	2.40%	▲2.40
Registered electors		78,295		▲33.54
JP gain from INC		Swing	▼23.72	

=== Assembly Election 1972 ===
1972 Mysore State Legislative Assembly election : Sathanur
Party	Candidate	Votes	%	±%
INC	H. Puttadasa	23,740	70.62%	▲28.11
INC(O)	G. C. Chandrasekhar	9,878	29.38%	New
Margin of victory		13,862	41.23%	▲39.56
Turnout		34,451	58.76%	▼5.17
Total valid votes		33,618		
Registered electors		58,632		▲16.51
INC gain from Independent		Swing	▲26.44	

=== Assembly Election 1967 ===
1967 Mysore State Legislative Assembly election : Sathanur
Party	Candidate	Votes	%	±%
Independent	H. Puttadasa	13,199	44.18%	New
INC	S. Honnaiah	12,700	42.51%	New
Independent	K. M. Madiah	2,910	9.74%	New
Independent	Ramaswamiah	1,064	3.56%	New
Margin of victory		499	1.67%	
Turnout		32,173	63.93%	
Total valid votes		29,873		
Registered electors		50,324		
Independent win (new seat)				

== See also ==
- List of constituencies of the Karnataka Legislative Assembly
