= D. K. Shivakumar =

Chief Minister of Karnataka since 2026

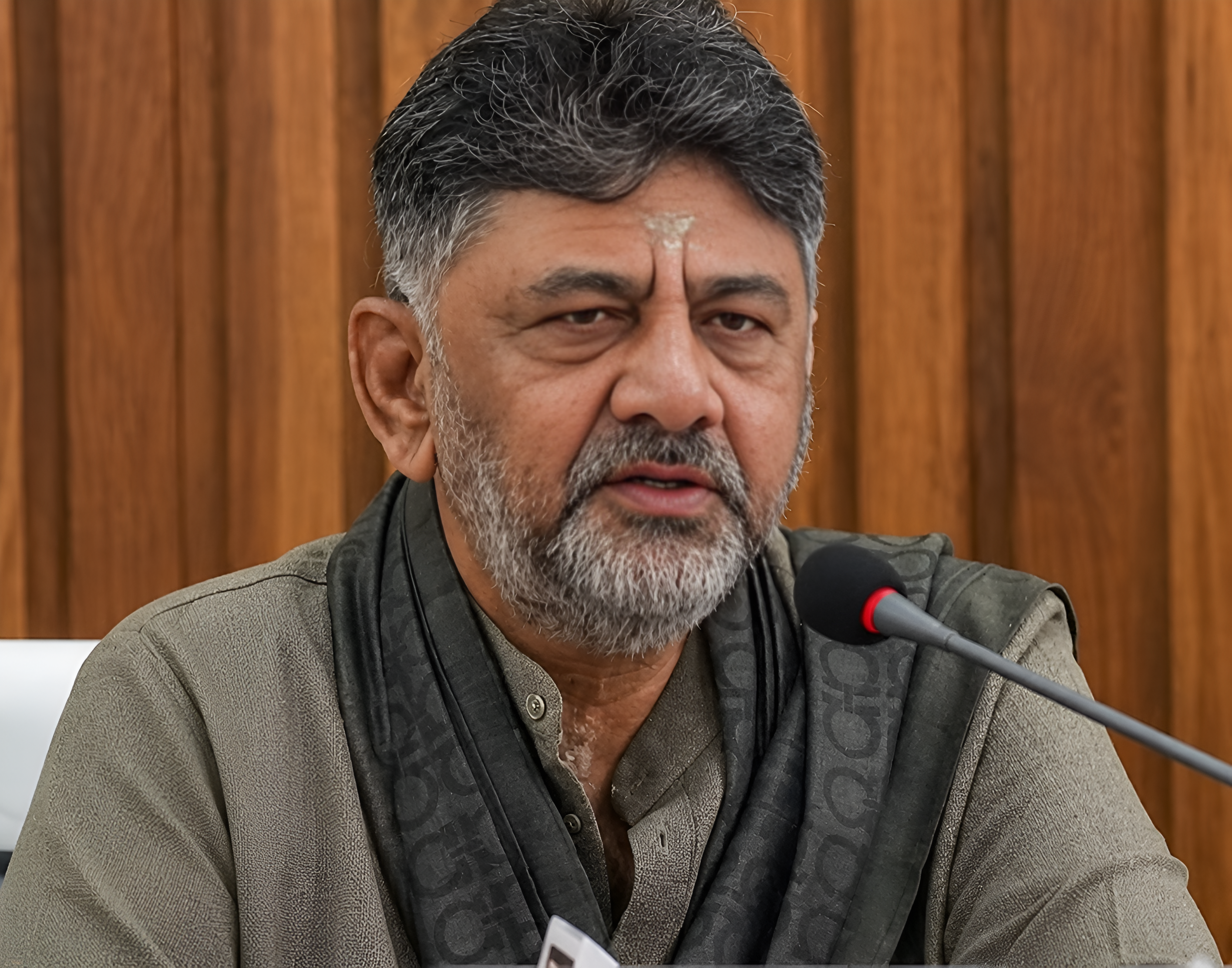
- Shivakumar in 2026

18th Chief Minister of Karnataka
- Incumbent
- Assumed office 3 June 2026
- Governor: Thawar Chand Gehlot; Sudha Yadav
- Deputy: G. Parameshwara
- Preceded by: Siddaramaiah
Additional ministries
Incumbent
Assumed office 3 June 2026
| Ministry and Departments | Finance; Cabinet Affairs; Dept. of Personnel and Administrative Reforms; Intelligence; Bengaluru Development Authority; Bengaluru Metropolitan Region Development Authority |
| Preceded by | Siddaramaiah |

Member of the Karnataka Legislative Assembly
- Incumbent
- Assumed office 15 May 2008
- Preceded by: P. G. R. Sindhia
- Constituency: Kanakapura
- In office 30 November 1989 – 15 May 2008
- Preceded by: K. L. Shivalinge Gowda
- Succeeded by: Constituency abolished
- Constituency: Sathanur

21th President of the Karnataka Pradesh Congress Committee
- In office 2 July 2020 – 3 June 2026
- AICC President: Sonia Gandhi (until 2022); Mallikarjun Kharge (from 2022)
- Preceded by: Dinesh Gundu Rao
- Succeeded by: B. K. Hariprasad

9th Deputy Chief Minister of Karnataka
- In office 20 May 2023 – 29 May 2026
- Governor: Thawar Chand Gehlot
- Cabinet: Second Siddaramaiah ministry
- Chief Minister: Siddaramaiah
- Portfolios: Water Resources Department (Major and Medium Irrigation); Bengaluru City Development (BBMP, BDA, BWSSB, BMRDA, BMRCL, GBA)
- Preceded by: Laxman Savadi; C. N. Ashwath Narayan; Govind Karjol
- Succeeded by: G. Parameshwara

Cabinet Minister Government of Karnataka
- In office 6 June 2018 – 8 July 2019
- Governor: Vajubhai Vala
- Cabinet: Second Kumaraswamy ministry
- Chief Minister: H. D. Kumaraswamy
- Portfolios: Water Resources; Medical Education
- Preceded by: M. B. Patil; Sharan Prakash Patil
- Succeeded by: Ramesh Jarkiholi; C. N. Ashwath Narayan
- In office 11 July 2014 – 19 May 2018
- Governor: H. R. Bhardwaj; Konijeti Rosaiah; Vajubhai Vala
- Cabinet: First Siddaramaiah ministry
- Chief Minister: Siddaramaiah
- Portfolios: Energy
- Preceded by: Shobha Karandlaje
- Succeeded by: K. J. George
- In office 11 October 1999 – 28 May 2004
- Governor: Khurshed Alam Khan; V. S. Ramadevi; T. N. Chaturvedi
- Cabinet: Krishna ministry
- Chief Minister: S. M. Krishna
- Portfolios: Urban Development
- Preceded by: Vaijanath Patil
- Succeeded by: N. Dharam Singh

Minister of State Government of Karnataka
- In office 17 October 1990 – 19 November 1992
- Governor: Bhanu Pratap Singh; Khurshed Alam Khan
- Cabinet: Bangarappa ministry
- Chief Minister: S. Bangarappa
- Portfolios: Prisons and Home Guards
- Preceded by: New Portfolio Allocation
- Succeeded by: Ramanath Rai

Working President of the Karnataka Pradesh Congress Committee
- In office 2008–2010
- Preceded by: Office established
- Succeeded by: Eshwara Khandre (2018)

Personal details
- Born: 15 May 1962 (age 64) Doddalahalli, Kanakapura, Mysore State, India
- Party: Indian National Congress
- Spouse: Usha Shivakumar
- Children: 3
- Relatives: D. K. Suresh (brother)
- Occupation: Politician

Doddalahalli Kempegowda Shivakumar (born 15 May 1962), commonly called in Kannada media as D. K. Shi, is an Indian politician and businessman who is serving as the 18th Chief Minister of Karnataka since 3 June 2026. A Leader of the Indian National Congress, he formerly served as the Deputy Chief Minister of Karnataka and President of the Karnataka Pradesh Congress Committee.

Shivakumar has represented the Kanakapura Assembly constituency in the Karnataka Legislative Assembly since 2008. Prior to this, he represented the Sathanur Assembly constituency from 1989 to 2008.

== Early and personal life ==
Shivakumar was born in Doddalahalli, a village in Kanakapura, Bengaluru South district, Karnataka, to Kempegowda and Gowramma. He belongs to the Vokkaliga community. D. K. Suresh, who is also a politician, is his younger brother.

Shivakumar studied at St. Rita School, Kanakapura, and at National Public School, Carmel School, and Vidyavardhaka School in Bengaluru. He then did his B.A. from Sri Jagadguru Renukacharya College, Bengaluru. In 2006, he completed his M.A. from the Karnataka State Open University.

Shivakumar married Usha in 1993. They have three children: two daughters, Aishwarya and Aabharana, and a son, Aakash. His elder daughter is married to Amartya, the son of Café Coffee Day founder V. G. Siddhartha. He is one of the richest politicians in India.

== Political career ==
Shivakumar started his political career in the early 1980s as a student leader and gradually rose through the ranks of the Congress party. He won his first election in 1989 when he was elected to the Karnataka Legislative Assembly from the Sathanur constituency in the Mysuru district. He was just 27 years old at the time and contested the election on a Congress ticket. Shivakumar went on to win re-election from the same constituency in the subsequent assembly elections in 1994, 1999 and 2004. He won from Kanakapura constituency in 2008, 2013, 2018 and 2023.

Vilasrao Deshmukh, during his tenure as Chief Minister of Maharashtra, worked closely with Shivakumar when he faced the motion of no confidence in 2002. Shivakumar hosted the Maharastra legislators in his resort located on the outskirts of Bangalore for a week until the date of the vote. This saved Deshmukh's government.

Just before his election to the Rajya Sabha in 2017 from Gujarat, he assisted his party leadership to move 42 Gujarat Congress MLAs into his resort in Bengaluru to avoid them moving to another political party. Subsequently, this helped Ahmed Patel to win the election.

He is credited with playing a critical role in the formation of the coalition government of Indian National Congress and Janata Dal (Secular) in Karnataka following the 2018 election.

He is also a close confidante of party leaders Sonia Gandhi and Rahul Gandhi. Shivakumar is among the richest politicians in India. While filing his nomination for election in 2018, he declared total assets of ₹840 crore.

On 2 July 2020, D. K. Shivakumar officially took as Karnataka PCC president succeeding Dinesh Gundu Rao.

On 20 May 2023, D. K. Shivakumar became the Deputy Chief Minister of Karnataka following the victory of the Congress party in the 2023 election.

=== Chief Minister of Karnataka (2026–present) ===
After Siddaramaiah stepped down as Chief Minister in May 2026, D. K. Shivakumar was seen as the front-runner for the post. He was sworn as Chief Minister on 3 June.

== Positions held ==
| Year | Position | Ref |
|---|---|---|
| 1989–1994 | Member of Karnataka Legislative Assembly: Minister of Prisons and Homeguards (17 October 1990 – 19 November 1992) | |
| 1994–1999 | Member of Karnataka Legislative Assembly | |
| 1999–2004 | Member of Karnataka Legislative Assembly: Minister of Urban Development (11 October 1999 – 20 May 2004) | |
| 2004–2008 | Member of Karnataka Legislative Assembly | |
| 2008–2013 | Member of Karnataka Legislative Assembly: KPCC Working President 2008 – 2010 | |
| 2013–2018 | Member of Karnataka Legislative Assembly: Minister of Energy (11 July 2014 – 19 May 2018) | |
| 2018–2023 | Member of Karnataka Legislative Assembly: Minister of Major Irrigation and Medical Education (23 May 2018 – 23 July 2019); Karnataka Pradesh Congress Committee President (2 July 2020 – 3 June 2026) | |
| 2023– | Member of Karnataka Legislative Assembly: Deputy Chief Minister of Karnataka (20 May 2023 - 3 June 2026); Chief Minister of Karnataka (3 June 2026 - present) | |

== Electoral statistics ==
| Year | Election | Constituency Name | Party | Result | Votes gained | Vote share% | Margin | Ref |
|---|---|---|---|---|---|---|---|---|
| 1985 | Karnataka Legislative Assembly | Sathanur | INC | Lost | 29,809 | 38.78% | 15,803 | |
| 1989 | Karnataka Legislative Assembly | Sathanur | INC | Won | 44,595 | 49.77% | 13,650 | |
| 1994 | Karnataka Legislative Assembly | Sathanur | IND | Won | 48,270 | 46.08% | 568 | |
| 1999 | Karnataka Legislative Assembly | Sathanur | INC | Won | 56,050 | 54.64% | 14,387 | |
| 2002 (bypoll) | Lok Sabha | Kanakapura | INC | Lost | 529,133 | 37.61% | 52,576 | |
| 2004 | Karnataka Legislative Assembly | Sathanur | INC | Won | 51,603 | 47.91% | 13,928 | |
| 2008 | Karnataka Legislative Assembly | Kanakapura | INC | Won | 68,096 | 48.34% | 7,179 | |
| 2013 | Karnataka Legislative Assembly | Kanakapura | INC | Won | 100,007 | 56.77% | 31,424 | |
| 2018 | Karnataka Legislative Assembly | Kanakapura | INC | Won | 127,552 | 68.52% | 79,909 | |
| 2023 | Karnataka Legislative Assembly | Kanakapura | INC | Won | 143,023 | 75.00% | 122,392 | |

Political offices
| Preceded by Laxman Savadi; C. N. Ashwath Narayan; Govind Karjol | Deputy Chief Minister of Karnataka; 2023 – 2026 | Succeeded by |
| Preceded by Siddaramaiah | Chief Minister of Karnataka; 2026 – present | Incumbent |
