= Uttarahalli =

Uttarahalli Subramanyapura
- Suburb
- Location within Bengaluru
- Coordinates: 12°54′20.83″N 77°32′33.50″E
- Country: India
- State: Karnataka
- District: Bangalore

Population (2001)
  - Total: 10,467

Languages
  - Official: Kannada
- Time zone: UTC+5:30 (IST)
- PIN: 560061
- Telephone code: 91-80
- Vehicle registration: KA 41

Uttarahalli is a southern suburb of Bangalore in the Indian state of Karnataka. It has grown quickly in the last 15-20 years and is now considered a popular area for families due to its connectivity and relatively calmer environment as compared to Central Bangalore.

It is located in the southwestern part of Bengaluru. It is proximal to areas such as Banashankari, Padmanabhanagar, Kengeri, Rajarajeshwari Nagar and Kumaraswamy Layout. Some of its sub areas include- Chikkalsandra, KSRTC Layout, Subramanyapura, Poornapragna Layout, Ramanjaneya Nagar, Arehalli, Kodipura and Vasanthapura.

Some famous temples here are Sri Subramanya Swamy Temple, Subramanyapura and the Vasantha Vallabharaya Swamy Temple, Vasanthpura.

== Demographics ==
As of 2001 India census, Uttarahalli had a population of 10,467. Males constitute 52% of the population and females 48%. Uttarahalli has an average literacy rate of 67%, higher than the national average of 59.5%: male literacy is 73%, and female literacy is 61%. In Uttarahalli, 13% of the population is under 6 years of age. It was India's largest electoral constituency. One of the prominent areas of Uttarahalli is Subramanyapura.
