= Suraj Revanna =

Indian politician

Member of Karnataka Legislative Council
- Incumbent
- Assumed office 7 February 2022
- Constituency: Hassan district

Personal details
- Born: 1 January 1988 (age 38)
- Relations: H. D. Deve Gowda (grand father); Prajwal Revanna (brother); H.D. Kumaraswamy (uncle); Anitha Kumaraswamy (aunt); Nikhil Kumarswamy (cousin)
- Parent(s): H. D. Revanna (father); Bhavani Revanna (mother)
- Education: MBBS - Rajiv Gandhi University of Health Sciences

Suraj Revanna is an Indian politician and physician who is serving as a Member of Karnataka Legislative Council from Hassan district. His political party is the Janata Dal (Secular).

== Personal life ==
He was born on 1 January 1988. He is the son of H. D. Revanna, MLA, and the grandson of H. D. Deve Gowda, Former Prime Minister of India. Former Chief Minister of Karnataka, H. D. Kumaraswamy is his uncle, and Suraj's younger brother, Prajwal Revanna, is a member of the 17th Lok Sabha from the Hassan Constituency.

He has completed his MBBS and MS from Rajiv Gandhi University of Health Sciences in May 2015 and has been elected as director of Hassan District Cooperative Central Bank (HDCC).

== Political career ==
Suraj Revanna stood for election to become the MLC of Hassan on 19 November 2021. This marked the entry of the 8th member of the Deve Gowda family into electoral politics. His victory in the elections to the Karnataka Legislative Council set a new record for one family's presence in all four Houses of the India legislature. His grandfather, a former PM, H. D. Deve Gowda is a member of the Rajya Sabha. His younger brother, Prajwal Revanna, an engineering graduate, was elected to Lok Sabha in 2019 to represent Hassan. His father, H.D. Revanna, a former minister representing the Holenarsipur constituency in the State Assembly, and his mother, Bhavani Revanna, a Hassan Zilla Panchayat member, Besides these four, two more members of the family—H.D. Kumaraswamy and Anita Kumaraswamy—are members of the State Assembly. He secured 2,281 votes of the total 3,478 votes polled.

== Controversy ==
On 23 June 2024, Suraj Revanna was arrested for the rape of a male worker. His brother Prajwal Revanna is a convicted criminal on sexual assault charges serving Life sentence. His father H.D. Revanna was also arrested but later released.
