= Prajwal Revanna =

Indian politician (born 1990)

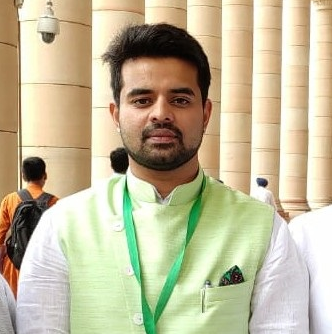

Member of Parliament, Lok Sabha
- In office 23 May 2019 – 4 June 2024
- Preceded by: H. D. Deve Gowda
- Succeeded by: Shreyas M. Patel
- Constituency: Hassan

Personal details
- Born: 5 August 1990 (age 36) Hassan, Karnataka, India
- Party: Janata Dal (Secular) (until 2024)
- Parent(s): H. D. Revanna; Bhavani Revanna
- Relatives: H. D. Deve Gowda (grandfather); Suraj Revanna (elder brother); H. D. Kumaraswamy (uncle); Anitha Kumaraswamy (aunt); Nikhil Kumar (cousin)
- Education: Bangalore Institute of Technology
- Profession: Politician

Prajwal Revanna (born 5 August 1990) is a convicted rapist, and former Indian politician, currently serving a life sentence for sexual assault and rape. He served as a member of the 17th Lok Sabha representing the Hassan constituency. He belongs to Karnataka's famous Devegowda Political family, grandson of former prime minister of India and former chief minister of Karnataka, H. D. Deve Gowda and nephew of former chief minister of Karnataka and current Union Minister of Heavy Industries & Steel, H. D. Kumaraswamy.

In 2024, Prajwal faced widespread accusations of raping multiple women. Videos of the alleged acts, reportedly recorded by Prajwal himself, circulated across Hassan district, triggering a major political and legal controversy. In August 2025, the Special Sessions Court for criminal cases against Members of Parliament and Members of Legislative Assembly convicted him and sentenced him to life imprisonment for the sexual assault of a domestic worker from Krishnarajanagara in Mysuru district, Karnataka. He is currently serving his sentence in Bengaluru Central Prison.

== Early life and background ==
Prajwal is the son of H. D. Revanna, former Minister for Public Works Department of Karnataka. He is a grandson of former Prime Minister of India H. D. Deve Gowda and nephew of former Chief Minister of Karnataka, H. D. Kumaraswamy.

Prajwal graduated in mechanical engineering from Bangalore Institute of Technology in 2014. He joined a master's degree programme in Australia but discontinued it to join politics.

== Political career ==
Prajwal started his political career by joining the campaign of H. D. Deve Gowda from Hassan in the 2014 Indian general election. He was among the 10 young aspiring politicians in India to be chosen by Commonwealth Parliamentary Association, United Kingdom, to be exposed to the British way of governance in 2015. He was appointed as the state general secretary of the Janata Dal (Secular) in 2017 . Although a JD(S) member from young age, his entry into electoral politics was delayed after the party denied him a ticket in the 2018 Karnataka Legislative Assembly election.

Deve Gowda finally allowed Prajwal to contest in the 2019 Indian general election from Hassan for the 17th Lok Sabha, himself moving to Tumkur. Prajwal won from Hassan, and became the only winner from his party's six candidates that contested the elections. Within 12 hours of the win, saddened by his grandfather's defeat from Tumkur, Prajwal announced his resignation and offered the seat to Gowda, who asked him to reconsider the decision. In September 2019, the Karnataka High Court issued a summons to him over an incomplete election affidavit. Petitioners of the summons accused Prajwal of filing a false and incomplete affidavit with his nomination papers during the 2019 elections. In January 2020, Justice John Michael D'Cunha dismissed the first petition on grounds that the petitioner had not complied with the statutory procedure under Section 81(3) of the Representation of the People Act, 1951, and the second on technical grounds.

Prajwal's political career ended as a consequence of his own criminal conduct. JD(S) suspended him with immediate effect once the circulating videos had caused what the party described as "huge embarrassment" to its leadership. He fled to Germany on a diplomatic passport shortly after the second phase of Lok Sabha polling, but was tracked through an Interpol Blue Corner Notice issued on 5 May and arrested at Kempegowda International Airport on 31 May 2024 upon returning to India. His suspension was subsequently converted into a permanent expulsion from the party. On 2 August 2025, the Special Court for People's Representatives sentenced him to life imprisonment, concluding both his legal proceedings and his political career.

== Criminal History ==
=== 2024 Sexual Abuse allegations, subsequent conviction and life sentence ===
Prajwal again contested from the Hassan constituency in the 2024 general election for the Lok Sabha. On the day of voting, his polling agent filed a complaint with the police alleging that some falsified photos and videos of Prajwal were being widely circulated in Hassan district and claimed that "the accused are going door to door and showing these obscene photos and videos, provoking people not to vote for Prajwal"

As media attention grew towards the alleged sexual abuse, on 27 April, the Government of Karnataka established a Special Investigation Team (SIT) to probe the allegations. The Karnataka State Commission for Women stated that it had also recorded cases of women being forced and filmed without consent. It was reported that thousands of pen drives containing these videos, reportedly made by Prajwal himself, were circulated, some being thrown in public places such as parks, bus stops and a stadium in Hassan.

The following day, it was reported that Prajwal had fled the country for Germany using his diplomatic passport which does not require a visa. His family and party members said that his trip was pre-planned. However, he did not obtain the clearance required for use of a diplomatic passport from the Ministry of External Affairs before traveling to Germany. On 30 April, Prajwal was suspended by the party, which stated that the suspension would stay till the SIT probe initiated against him was completed.

As Prajwal continued to evade authorities, the SIT sought help from the Interpol to locate him, and a blue corner notice was issued on 5 May.

On 31 May 2024, Prajwal was arrested at Kempegowda International Airport in Bangalore after arriving on a Lufthansa flight from Munich. Interpol informed the SIT of Prajwal's check-in and boarding information from Munich. He was detained by immigration officers and handed over to the police at the airport. Initially, a special court for elected representatives remanded him to SIT custody until 6 June, which was later extended to 10 June. Prajwal's father, H. D. Revanna, said he should be hanged if he is found guilty of committing any crime.

Prajwal was convicted of rape in the first case. Judge Santhosh Gajanan Bhat of the special court for elected representatives found Prajwal guilty of sexually assaulting a farm labourer who worked for his family and for recording the assault. This is the first judgement in one of four cases filed against him. On 2 August 2025, a special court in Bengaluru sentenced Prajwal to life imprisonment, and fined him Rs 5 lakh, for sexually assaulting a 48-year-old woman who was working as house help at his residence. The court also said that the victim will be given Rs 7 lakh in compensation.

On 3 December 2025, the Karnataka High Court refused to suspend his life sentence, with a division bench of Justice K S Mudagal and Justice Venkatesh Naik T ruling that the gravity of the offences, the multiple pending cases against him, and the risk of witness tampering made it unfit for bail, scheduling the final appeal hearing for 12 January 2026.
