= Holenarasipur Assembly constituency =

Constituency of the Karnataka legislative assembly in India

Coordinates: 12.79°N 76.24°E

Holenarasipur
- Constituency No. 197 for the Karnataka Legislative Assembly

Constituency details
- Country: India
- Region: South India
- State: Karnataka
- District: Hassan
- Lok Sabha constituency: Hassan
- Established: 1951
- Total electors: 220,511 (2023)
- Reservation: None

Member of Legislative Assembly
- 16th Karnataka Legislative Assembly
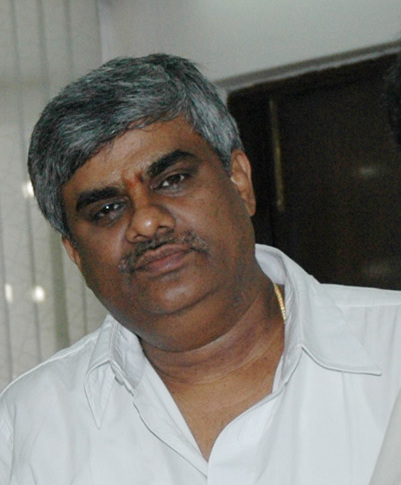
- Incumbent H. D. Revanna
- Party: JD(S)
- Alliance: NDA
- Elected year: 2023
- Preceded by: A. Doddegowda

Holenarasipur Assembly constituency is one of the seats in Karnataka Legislative Assembly in India.

It is a segment of Hassan Lok Sabha constituency.

== Members of the Legislative Assembly ==
Election	Member	Party
1952	A. G. Ramachandra	Indian National Congress
1957	Y. Veerappa	Praja Socialist Party
1962	H. D. Deve Gowda	Independent politician
1967	H. D. Deve Gowda	Independent politician
1972	H. D. Deve Gowda	Indian National Congress
1978	H. D. Deve Gowda	Janata Party
1983	H. D. Deve Gowda	Janata Party
1985	H. D. Deve Gowda	Janata Party
1989	G. Puttaswamy Gowda	Indian National Congress
1994	H. D. Revanna	Janata Dal
1999	Doddegowda. A	Indian National Congress
2004	H. D. Revanna	Janata Dal
2008	H. D. Revanna	Janata Dal
2013	H. D. Revanna	Janata Dal
2018	H. D. Revanna	Janata Dal
2023	H. D. Revanna	Janata Dal

== Election results ==
=== Assembly Election 2023 ===
2023 Karnataka Legislative Assembly election : Holenarasipur
Party	Candidate	Votes	%	±%
JD(S)	H. D. Revanna	88,103	47.51%	▼12.62
INC	Shreyas M. Patel	84,951	45.81%	▲9.96
BJP	G. Devarajegowda	4,850	2.62%	▲0.59
AAP	Geetha Shivaswamy	2,425	1.31%	New
Purvanchal Mahapanchayat	H. D. Revanna	2,061	1.11%	New
Kranti Sabha	B. K. Nagaraja	1,151	0.62%	New
NOTA	None of the above	760	0.41%	▼0.14
Margin of victory		3,152	1.70%	▼22.58
Turnout		186,126	84.41%	▼1.95
Total valid votes		185,444		
Registered electors		220,511		▲5.46
JD(S) hold		Swing	▼12.62	

=== Assembly Election 2018 ===
2018 Karnataka Legislative Assembly election : Holenarasipur
Party	Candidate	Votes	%	±%
JD(S)	H. D. Revanna	108,541	60.13%	▲5.68
INC	Manjegowda. B. P	64,709	35.85%	▼0.95
BJP	M. N. Raju	3,667	2.03%	▲1.28
NOTA	None of the above	984	0.55%	New
Margin of victory		43,832	24.28%	▲6.63
Turnout		180,562	86.36%	▲4.53
Total valid votes		180,496		
Registered electors		209,086		▲5.42
JD(S) hold		Swing	▲5.68	

=== Assembly Election 2013 ===
2013 Karnataka Legislative Assembly election : Holenarasipur
Party	Candidate	Votes	%	±%
JD(S)	H. D. Revanna	92,713	54.45%	▼0.13
INC	S. G. Anupama	62,655	36.80%	▲1.67
BSP	M. C. Shivanna	1,491	0.88%	▼0.58
BJP	G. T. Hemanth Kumar	1,277	0.75%	▼2.37
Independent	M. Mahesh Alias Harsha	1,258	0.74%	New
Margin of victory		30,058	17.65%	▼1.81
Turnout		162,295	81.83%	▲3.50
Total valid votes		170,262		
Registered electors		198,341		▲9.49
JD(S) hold		Swing	▼0.13	

=== Assembly Election 2008 ===
2008 Karnataka Legislative Assembly election : Holenarasipur
Party	Candidate	Votes	%	±%
JD(S)	H. D. Revanna	77,448	54.58%	▲1.01
INC	S. G. Anupama	49,842	35.13%	▲8.56
BJP	K. M. Shrinivasa	4,420	3.12%	▼9.58
Independent	N. Shivaswamy	2,566	1.81%	New
BSP	H. R. Nagendra	2,078	1.46%	▼1.19
Independent	K. D. Revanna	2,075	1.46%	New
Independent	M. Mahesh Alias Harsha	879	0.62%	New
Margin of victory		27,606	19.46%	▼7.54
Turnout		141,896	78.33%	▲2.03
Total valid votes		141,889		
Registered electors		181,153		▲14.28
JD(S) hold		Swing	▲1.01	

=== Assembly Election 2004 ===
2004 Karnataka Legislative Assembly election : Holenarasipur
Party	Candidate	Votes	%	±%
JD(S)	H. D. Revanna	64,664	53.57%	▲15.06
INC	G. Puttaswamy Gowda	32,070	26.57%	▼30.94
BJP	Doddegowda. A	15,329	12.70%	▲11.01
BSP	Somashekar. M	3,204	2.65%	New
JP	Kalappa. K. P	2,668	2.21%	New
Independent	Revanna	1,353	1.12%	New
Independent	Mahesha. M	754	0.62%	New
Margin of victory		32,594	27.00%	▲8.00
Turnout		120,938	76.30%	▼3.64
Total valid votes		120,701		
Registered electors		158,510		▲5.65
JD(S) gain from INC		Swing	▼3.94	

=== Assembly Election 1999 ===
1999 Karnataka Legislative Assembly election : Holenarasipur
Party	Candidate	Votes	%	±%
INC	Doddegowda. A	67,151	57.51%	▲14.62
JD(S)	H. D. Revanna	44,964	38.51%	New
Independent	M. Mahesh Alias Harsha	2,665	2.28%	New
BJP	B. M. Sadashiva	1,975	1.69%	▲0.92
Margin of victory		22,187	19.00%	▲18.89
Turnout		119,937	79.94%	▼2.40
Total valid votes		116,755		
Rejected ballots		3,106	2.59%	▲1.26
Registered electors		150,036		▲10.09
INC gain from JD		Swing	▲14.51	

=== Assembly Election 1994 ===
1994 Karnataka Legislative Assembly election : Holenarasipur
Party	Candidate	Votes	%	±%
JD	H. D. Revanna	47,606	43.00%	▲42.50
INC	G. Puttaswamy Gowda	47,484	42.89%	▼10.54
INC	Doddegowda. A	14,444	13.05%	New
BJP	G. S. Susheelamma	852	0.77%	New
Margin of victory		122	0.11%	▼7.75
Turnout		112,216	82.34%	▼0.87
Total valid votes		110,704		
Rejected ballots		1,496	1.33%	▼1.01
Registered electors		136,288		▲11.04
JD gain from INC		Swing	▼10.43	

=== Assembly Election 1989 ===
1989 Karnataka Legislative Assembly election : Holenarasipur
Party	Candidate	Votes	%	±%
INC	G. Puttaswamy Gowda	53,297	53.43%	▲50.74
JP	H. D. Deve Gowda	45,461	45.58%	New
Margin of victory		7,836	7.86%	▲4.07
Turnout		102,131	83.21%	▼0.82
Total valid votes		99,743		
Rejected ballots		2,388	2.34%	▲1.05
Registered electors		122,740		▲21.81
INC gain from JP		Swing	▲4.10	

=== Assembly Election 1985 ===
1985 Karnataka Legislative Assembly election : Holenarasipur
Party	Candidate	Votes	%	±%
JP	H. D. Deve Gowda	41,230	49.33%	▼5.21
Independent	G. Puttaswamy Gowda	38,063	45.54%	New
INC	T. L. Krishna Kumar	2,246	2.69%	▼38.55
Independent	M. Nanjundappa	1,556	1.86%	New
Margin of victory		3,167	3.79%	▼9.51
Turnout		84,673	84.03%	▲3.05
Total valid votes		83,581		
Rejected ballots		1,092	1.29%	▼0.48
Registered electors		100,763		▲17.39
JP hold		Swing	▼5.21	

=== Assembly Election 1983 ===
1983 Karnataka Legislative Assembly election : Holenarasipur
Party	Candidate	Votes	%	±%
JP	H. D. Deve Gowda	37,239	54.54%	▲2.10
INC	K. Kumaraswamy	28,158	41.24%	▲38.70
Independent	T. N. Jayalingappa	1,094	1.60%	New
BJP	N. K. Virupakshaiah	708	1.04%	New
Margin of victory		9,081	13.30%	▲4.78
Turnout		69,508	80.98%	▼3.92
Total valid votes		68,281		
Rejected ballots		1,227	1.77%	▲0.03
Registered electors		85,835		▲10.45
JP hold		Swing	▲2.10	

=== Assembly Election 1978 ===
1978 Karnataka Legislative Assembly election : Holenarasipur
Party	Candidate	Votes	%	±%
JP	H. D. Deve Gowda	33,992	52.44%	New
INC(I)	K. Kumaraswamy	28,472	43.92%	New
INC	S. N. Nanjappa	1,645	2.54%	▼38.81
Independent	C. Channegowda	395	0.61%	New
Margin of victory		5,520	8.52%	▼3.93
Turnout		65,974	84.90%	▲8.15
Total valid votes		64,824		
Rejected ballots		1,150	1.74%	▲1.74
Registered electors		77,712		▲17.23
JP gain from INC(O)		Swing	▼1.36	

=== Assembly Election 1972 ===
1972 Mysore State Legislative Assembly election : Holenarasipur
Party	Candidate	Votes	%	±%
INC(O)	H. D. Deve Gowda	26,639	53.80%	New
INC	K. Kumaraswamy	20,475	41.35%	▲6.35
SWA	D. S. Mahadevappa	1,295	2.62%	New
Independent	M. Nanjundappa	1,102	2.23%	New
Margin of victory		6,164	12.45%	▼11.67
Turnout		50,879	76.75%	▲12.77
Total valid votes		49,511		
Registered electors		66,289		▲12.13
INC(O) gain from Independent		Swing	▼5.32	

=== Assembly Election 1967 ===
1967 Mysore State Legislative Assembly election : Holenarasipur
Party	Candidate	Votes	%	±%
Independent	H. D. Deve Gowda	20,594	59.12%	New
INC	H. D. Doddegowda	12,191	35.00%	▲10.30
Independent	K. J. Kalegowda	2,049	5.88%	New
Margin of victory		8,403	24.12%	▲6.33
Turnout		37,825	63.98%	▲0.43
Total valid votes		34,834		
Registered electors		59,116		▲17.69
Independent hold		Swing	▲16.63	

=== Assembly Election 1962 ===
1962 Mysore State Legislative Assembly election : Holenarasipur
Party	Candidate	Votes	%	±%
Independent	H. D. Deve Gowda	12,622	42.49%	New
INC	H. D. Doddegowda	7,338	24.70%	▼16.06
PSP	Y. Veerappa	6,052	20.38%	▼38.86
SWA	B. C. Mayigowda	2,934	9.88%	New
Independent	Rangaiah	757	2.55%	New
Margin of victory		5,284	17.79%	▼0.69
Turnout		31,920	63.55%	▼2.87
Total valid votes		29,703		
Registered electors		50,232		▲14.69
Independent gain from PSP		Swing	▼16.75	

=== Assembly Election 1957 ===
1957 Mysore State Legislative Assembly election : Holenarasipur
Party	Candidate	Votes	%	±%
PSP	Y. Veerappa	17,233	59.24%	New
INC	A. G. Ramachandra	11,857	40.76%	▼20.00
Margin of victory		5,376	18.48%	▼19.74
Turnout		29,090	66.42%	▲11.04
Total valid votes		29,090		
Registered electors		43,799		▲17.76
PSP gain from INC		Swing	▼1.52	

=== Assembly Election 1952 ===
1952 Mysore State Legislative Assembly election : Holenarasipur
Party	Candidate	Votes	%	±%
INC	A. G. Ramachandra	12,515	60.76%	New
Socialist Party (India)	Y. Veerappa	4,643	22.54%	New
Independent	J. P. Khanderaya Setty	3,440	16.70%	New
Margin of victory		7,872	38.22%	
Turnout		20,598	55.38%	
Total valid votes		20,598		
Registered electors		37,193		
INC win (new seat)				

== See also ==
- List of constituencies of Karnataka Legislative Assembly
