= Chennamma Deve Gowda =

Indian political figure (1936/1937–2026)

Spouse of the Prime Minister of India
- In role 1 June 1996 – 21 April 1997
- Prime Minister: H. D. Deve Gowda
- Preceded by: Duja Devi
- Succeeded by: Sheila Gujral

Spouse of the Chief Minister of Karnataka
- In role 11 December 1994 – 31 May 1996
- Chief Minister: H. D. Deve Gowda
- Preceded by: Malathi Moily
- Succeeded by: Sarvamangala Patil

Personal details
- Born: Chennamma; 1936 or 1937 Hassan, Karnataka, India
- Died: 18 July 2026 Bengaluru, Karnataka, India
- Citizenship: Indian
- Spouse: H. D. Deve Gowda
- Children: 6 incl.: H. D. Balakrishna; H. D. Revanna; H. D. Kumaraswamy; H. D. Ramesh; Anasuya Manjunath; H. D. Shylaja
- Relatives: Bhavani Revanna (daughter-in-law); Anitha Kumaraswamy (daughter-in-law); C. N. Manjunath (son-in-law)

Chennamma Deve Gowda (1936 or 1937 – 18 July 2026) was an Indian political figure. She was the spouse of H. D. Deve Gowda, who served as the 11th prime minister of India from June 1996 to April 1997.

== Biography ==
Gowda had four sons and two daughters including H. D. Kumaraswamy, a former Chief Minister of Karnataka, and H. D. Revanna, a member of Karnataka Legislative Assembly.

In February 2001, Chennamma was the victim of an acid attack, which allegedly stemmed from a family feud. She died in Bengaluru on 18 July 2026, at the age of 89.
