= Jaguar (2016 film) =

2016 film by A. Mahadev

- Directed by: A. Mahadev
- Screenplay by: A. Mahadev
- Story by: V. Vijayendra Prasad
- Produced by: Anitha Kumaraswamy
- Starring: Nikhil Kumaraswamy; Deepti Sati
- Cinematography: Manoj Paramahamsa
- Edited by: Ruben
- Music by: Thaman S
- Production company: Channambika Films
- Release date: 6 October 2016
- Running time: 144 minutes
- Country: India
- Languages: Telugu; Kannada

Jaguar is a 2016 Indian vigilante action film directed by A. Mahadev from a story by V. Vijayendra Prasad and produced by H. D. Kumaraswamy under Channambika Films. The film, shot simultaneously in Kannada and Telugu languages, stars Nikhil Kumaraswamy, alongside Deepti Sati, Jagapathi Babu, Aadarsh Balakrishna, Ramya Krishnan, Rao Ramesh, Sampath Raj, Adithya Menon, Ravi Kale, Supreeth and Saurav Lokesh in supporting roles. The music was composed by Thaman S, while the cinematography and editing were handled by Manoj Paramahamsa and Ruben respectively.

== Plot ==
Krishna disguises himself in a vigilante costume and kills a Judge, broadcasting the act on SS Channels, a leading news channel. Krishna joins SS medical college and behaves carefreely, which earns the ire of senior student leader Arya. Krishna soon falls for Priya, Arya's sister. Although Priya initially gets irritated by Krishna's antics, she warms up to him after he saves a patient from heart attack. Later, Krishna wears a helmet and attempts to molest Priya, but she escapes and informs Arya. Arya assumes that Ajay, a womaniser and the son of SS College Chairman Somnath Prasad, is behind this as he has a history of such behaviour. Arya and the students form a strike in front of the college.

Meanwhile, a CBI officer is appointed to investigate the Judge's death where he dubs the killer as Jaguar. The officer interrogates SS Channel CEO Shouri Prasad, whom pays no heed. Somnath Prasad hires ACP Encounter Shankar to call off the students' strike, but Krishna kills Shankar in an amusement park, where he steals Arya's phone and sends the pictures of himself, SS Brothers and Ajay to the CBI officer, stating that he will kill them. This makes the SS brothers believe that Arya is Jaguar. The SS brothers invite Krishna to stay in their house to learn more about Jaguar. Ajay plans to kidnap Arya as a fake Jaguar and kill him in live on air, but Krishna saves Arya and kills Ajay.

The SS brothers plan to kill Arya, but Krishna tells them to bribe him. When they meet, Arya denies it and throws Krishna out of the college. The SS brothers plan to tarnish Arya's reputation. They reveal to Krishna that Shivaprasad, an altruistic doctor, was framed by SS brothers for a schoolgirl's death, leading to his suicide. However, Krishna brings his mother to their house and reveals himself as Shivaprasad's son. Krishna exposes their crimes to the public, having inserting live cameras in their house, and kills the henchman and Somnath Prasad. Krishna brings Shouri Prasad in front of the college. In the aftermath, Shouri Prasad gets arrested by the police, while Krishna finally reunites with his mother, Priya and Arya, and opens an orphanage in Shivaprasad's memory.

== Cast ==
- Nikhil Kumaraswamy as SS Krishna / "Jaguar"
- Deepti Sati as Priya, Krishna's love interest and Arya's sister
- Jagapathi Babu as CBI Officer
- Aadarsh Balakrishna as Arya, Priya's brother
- Rao Ramesh as Dr Shivaprasad, Krishna's father
- Ramya Krishnan as Raja Lakshmi, Krishna's mother
- Sampath Raj as Shouri Prasad
- Adithya Menon as Somnath Prasad
- Vidyullekha Raman as Priya's friend
- Avinash as College Principal
- Raghu Babu as CBI Officer Raghu
- Saurav Lokesh as Ajay
- Supreeth as "Encounter" Shankar
- Ravi Kale as Judge (Former Advocate)
- Sadhu Kokila (Kannada) / Brahmanandam (Telugu) as fake Jaguar
- Prashanth Siddi
- Rajesh Nataranga

Cameo appearance

- Kavita Radheshyam
- Tamannaah Bhatia in the song "Sampige"

== Production ==
In December 2015, it was announced that Nikhil Kumaraswamy, the son of H. D. Kumaraswamy would make his acting debut in the film titled Jaguar, with the story written by V. Vijayendra Prasad and A. Mahadev as the director.

== Music ==
Jaguar

Soundtrack album by Thaman S
- Released: 2 September 2016
- Recorded: 2016
- Genre: Feature film soundtrack
- Length: 24:38 / 23:13
- Language: Kannada / Telugu
- Label: T-Series / Lahari Music
- Director: Thaman S

Thaman S chronology
Thikka (2016)	Jaguar (2016)	Shivalinga (2017)

External audio
- Kannada Audio Jukebox on YouTube
- Telugu Audio Jukebox on YouTube

The film's music, composed by Thaman S, includes six tracks for the Kannada version and five tracks for the Telugu version.

Kannada
No.	Title	Lyrics	Singer(s)	Length
1.	"Get Set Go Ready"	Chethan Kumar	Chandan Shetty	03:45
2.	"Priya Priya"	Chandan Shetty	Rahul Nambiar	05:23
3.	"Selfie"	Chandan Shetty	Mika Singh, Kanika Kapoor	04:47
4.	"Mamaseetha"	Chethan Kumar	Karthik, Megha	04:38
5.	"Sampige"	Ramajogayya Sastry	Deepak, Sammeera	04:40
6.	"Theme" (Instrumental)			01:25
Total length:				24:38

All lyrics are written by Ramajogayya Sastry.

Telugu
No.	Title	Singer(s)	Length
1.	"Get Set Go Ready"	Ranjith	03:45
2.	"Nammave Bujji Thalle"	Rahul Nambiar	05:23
3.	"Andaniki Selfie Ve"	Mika Singh, Kanika Kapoor	04:47
4.	"Ma Ma Mama Seetha"	Karthik, Megha	04:38
5.	"Mandara Thailam"	Deepak, Sanjana	04:40
Total length:			23:13

== Release ==
Jaguar was released worldwide on 6 October 2016 to mixed reviews from critics.

== Reception ==
Sunayana Suresh of The Times of India wrote "Jaguar is a slick, stylish film that has all the necessary commercial elements that one requires to impress the fans. Shyam Prasad S of Bangalore Mirror wrote "Jaguar is a good film only because it has a newcomer. It has the kind of budget-induced grandeur and big names that most debutants can only dream of." Rakesh Mehar of The News Minute wrote "Jaguar is all about Nikhil Kumar, and he has the ripped body, fighting and dancing skills to deliver as an action star." A. Sharadhaa of The New Indian Express wrote "Jaguar is purely Nikhil’s film and his hardwork is evident on screen."

== Awards and nominations ==
Award	Category	Recipient	Result	Ref.
6th South Indian International Movie Awards	Best Debut Actor - Kannada	Nikhil Kumaraswamy	Won	
6th South Indian International Movie Awards	Best Debut Actor - Telugu	Nikhil Kumaraswamy	Nominated	
