= Seetharama Kalyana =

2019 film written and directed by Harsha

- Theatrical poster, of the film
- Directed by: A. Harsha
- Screenplay by: Harish Krishnan T A. Harsha
- Story by: Kalyan Krishna Kurasala
- Based on: Rarandoi Veduka Chudham (Telugu)
- Produced by: Anitha Kumaraswamy
- Starring: Nikhil Gowda; Rachita Ram; R. Sarathkumar; P. Ravishankar; Madhoo; Sanjay Kapoor; Bhagyashree
- Cinematography: Swamy J. Gowda
- Edited by: Ganesh
- Music by: Anup Rubens
- Production company: Channambika Films
- Release date: 25 January 2019
- Country: India
- Language: Kannada
- Budget: ₹15 crores
- Box office: ₹20 crores

Seetharama Kalyana is a 2019 Indian Kannada-language action drama film written and directed by A. Harsha and produced by Anitha Kumaraswamy under the Channambika Films banner. The film has an ensemble cast with Nikhil Kumar and Rachita Ram in the lead roles. The supporting cast includes R. Sarathkumar, P. Ravi Shankar, Madhoo, Hindi actor Sanjay Kapoor making his debut in Kannada, Bhagyashree, Adithya Menon, Chikkanna, Sadhu Kokila among others. It is an unofficial remake of the 2017 Telugu film Rarandoi Veduka Chudham.

The technical crew members for the film include Anup Rubens as the music composer, Swamy. J as the cinematographer, Ganesh as the editor, and Ram-Lakshman as the stunt choreographers.

The film released on 25 January 2019 coinciding the Republic day holiday. It has been reported that the film's Hindi dubbing rights has been sold for ₹5.5 crore.

== Plot ==
Geetha is a pampered daughter of a wealthy merchant Narasimha, who meets Arya, a happy-go-lucky person in her friends' wedding. Geetha is relucantly sent to Bangalore for studies by her mother, where she gets in touch with Arya, who begins to help her in studies. Geetha tells him that she is not interested in a relationship with him. Arya loves her, but in fear of rejection, doesn't reveal his love.

Later they get into an argument, with Arya revealing his love for her and being frustrated on her not having a clarity on her life and that she keeps waiting for a prince and doesn't realize what she has. Geetha furiously returns home, and accepts a marriage proposal by her cousin Chandan out of anger. Chandan's father Viswa learns about Geetha and Arya's love, and reveals it to Narasimha. Narasimha tells Geetha about his past:

Past: Narasimha's elder sister Meera gets engaged to Viswa, who was his trusted servant and employer. Ten days before her wedding, Viswa finds Meera pregnant with Shankar's child and reveals it to Narasimha, due to which the friendship turns into enmity.

Present: It is revealed that Arya is Shankar's son, where Shankar learns about Arya being in love with Narasimha's daughter Geetha. Shankar tells Arya to head towards Geetha's village. After a fight, Arya reveals that Meera was in love with another doctor, who is also named as Shankar. When Shankar finds that she was pregnant with Dr. Shankar's child (Arya). They decided to reveal it to Narasimha. However, Viswa gets enraged upon learning this and killed Meera and Dr. Shankar. Shankar was also knocked by Viswa and gone into coma. With no one left, Shankar decided to bury the truth as Viswa married Narasimha's younger sister Jyoti, and raised Arya as his own son.

Narasimha and his family gets distraught upon learning this, Chandan and Viswa tries to kidnap Geetha, but Arya and Shankar stops them and lets them live. Finally, Shankar and Narasimha reunite and they approve Geetha and Arya's relationship.

== Cast ==
- Nikhil Kumar as Arya, A happy go lucky person
- Rachita Ram as Geetha, A simple village girl who believes in God
- R. Sarathkumar as Shankar, Arya's adopted father, Narshima's friend
- P. Ravishankar as Narsimha, Geetha's father
- Madhoo as Lakshmi, Geetha's mother
- Sanjay Kapoor as Dr. Shankar, Meera's husband, Arya's biological father
- Bhagyashree as Meera, Narsimha's sister, Dr. Shankar's wife, Arya's biological mother
- Adhitya as Viswa, Narahima's servant who marries his sister Jyothi
- Chikkanna as Arya's friend
- Girija Lokesh as Geetha' grandmother
- Shivaraj K. R. Pete as wedding worker
- Nayana as Nayana, Geetha's cousin

== Soundtrack ==
Seetharama Kalyana

Soundtrack album by Anup Rubens
- Released: 19 January 2019
- Recorded: 2018
- Genre: Feature film soundtrack
- Label: Lahari Music
- Producer: Anup Rubens

Anup Rubens has scored the soundtrack and score for the film. A total of three songs were composed by him. The audio was launched under the Lahari Music audio label. A romantic single "Ninna Raja Naanu" was released on 16 November 2018.

Track listing
| No. | Title | Lyrics | Singer(s) | Length |
|---|---|---|---|---|
| 1. | "Ninna Raja Naanu" | V. Sai Sukanya | Armaan Malik | 04:38 |
| 2. | "O Jaanu O Jaanu" | K. Kalyan | Sanjith Hegde | 04:03 |
| 3. | "Mangalyam Thanthunanena" | V. Nagendra Prasad | Vijay Prakash | 4:20 |
| 4. | "Bhoomiye Mantapa" | V. Nagendra Prasad | Kailash Kher | 3:55 |
| 5. | "Yaara Shaapa Idu" | V. Nagendra Prasad | Kailash Kher | 3:49 |
