= H. D. Revanna =

Indian politician

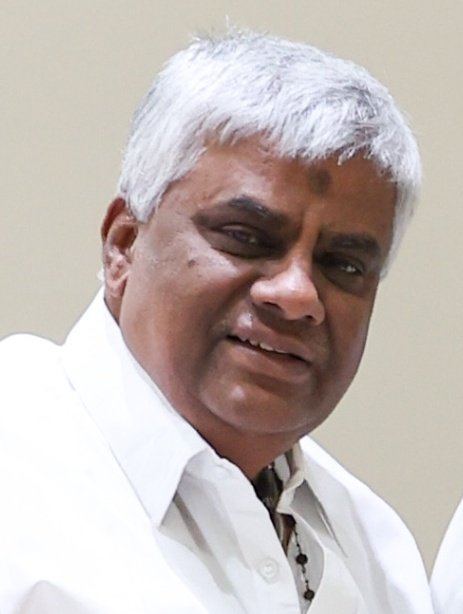

Minister of Public Works Department, Government of Karnataka
- In office 6 June 2018 – 23 July 2019
- Preceded by: Dr. H. C. Mahadevappa
- Succeeded by: Govind M. Karjol
- In office 28 May 2004 - 8 Oct 2007
- Preceded by: Dharam Singh
- Succeeded by: C. M. Udasi, BJP
- Constituency: Holenarasipur

Member of Karnataka Legislative Assembly
- Incumbent
- Assumed office 14 June 2004 - present 11 December 1994 – 12 June 1999
- Preceded by: G. Puttaswamy Gowda; A. Doddegowda
- Constituency: Holenarasipur

Personal details
- Born: 17 December 1957 (age 68) Haradanahalli, Mysore State, India
- Party: Janata Dal (Secular)
- Spouse: Bhavani
- Children: Suraj Revanna; Prajwal Revanna
- Parents: H. D. Deve Gowda (father); Chennamma Deve Gowda (mother)
- Relatives: H. D. Kumaraswamy (brother); Nikhil Gowda (nephew)
- Education: SSLC

Hardanahalli Devegowda Revanna (born 17 December 1957) is an Indian politician from the state of Karnataka, and a member of the Legislative Assembly in the state of Karnataka, representing the Holenarasipur constituency in Hassan district who served as PWD minister under Dharam Singh & his younger brother Kumaraswamy. His political party is Janata Dal (Secular). H. D. Revanna was booked in a kidnapping case in April 2024 after a 20-year-old man filed a police complaint. Allegedly that Revanna’s associate abducted his mother, who was among the many women featured in the alleged sexual abuse tapes of Revanna’s son Prajwal Revanna. Both of his children are embroiled in sexual assault scandals, Suraj Revanna, the elder one, a incumbent Member of Legislative Council from Hassan in the Karnataka Legislative Council is undergoing trail while Prajwal Revanna, the younger one, is a convict and was a Member of Parliament from Hassan in the 17th Lok Sabha.

== Personal life and family ==
He is one of the sons of former Prime Minister of India H. D. Deve Gowda and Chanamma, and is the elder brother of H. D. Kumaraswamy. He is married to Bhavani Revanna and he has two sons Suraj and Prajwal. His son, Prajwal Revanna, was elected to Lok Sabha from Hassan constituency in 2019. He was absconding after his alleged sex tapes were leaked, having fled to Germany. He arrived in Bangalore back on May 31. Currently he is in the custody of Special Investigation Team (India). Revanna has stated that his son should be hanged if he is guilty of committing crimes.

His son, Suraj was also arrested by Police in alleged sexual harassment case on 23 June 2024.

== Political career ==
He won the Holenarasipur Assembly constituency in 1994. He again contested unsuccessfully in 1999, which he won back again in the 2004 and continuously did so till now. This time he became Minister for PWD (Public Works Department) and Energy Department in Dharam Singh and H. D. Kumaraswamy ministries. H. D. Revanna was also the president of Karnataka Milk Federation (KMF) for 9 years. In 2023 Karnataka Legislative Assembly elections, H. D. Revanna won by receiving 88,103 votes from Holenarasipur.

== Gallery ==
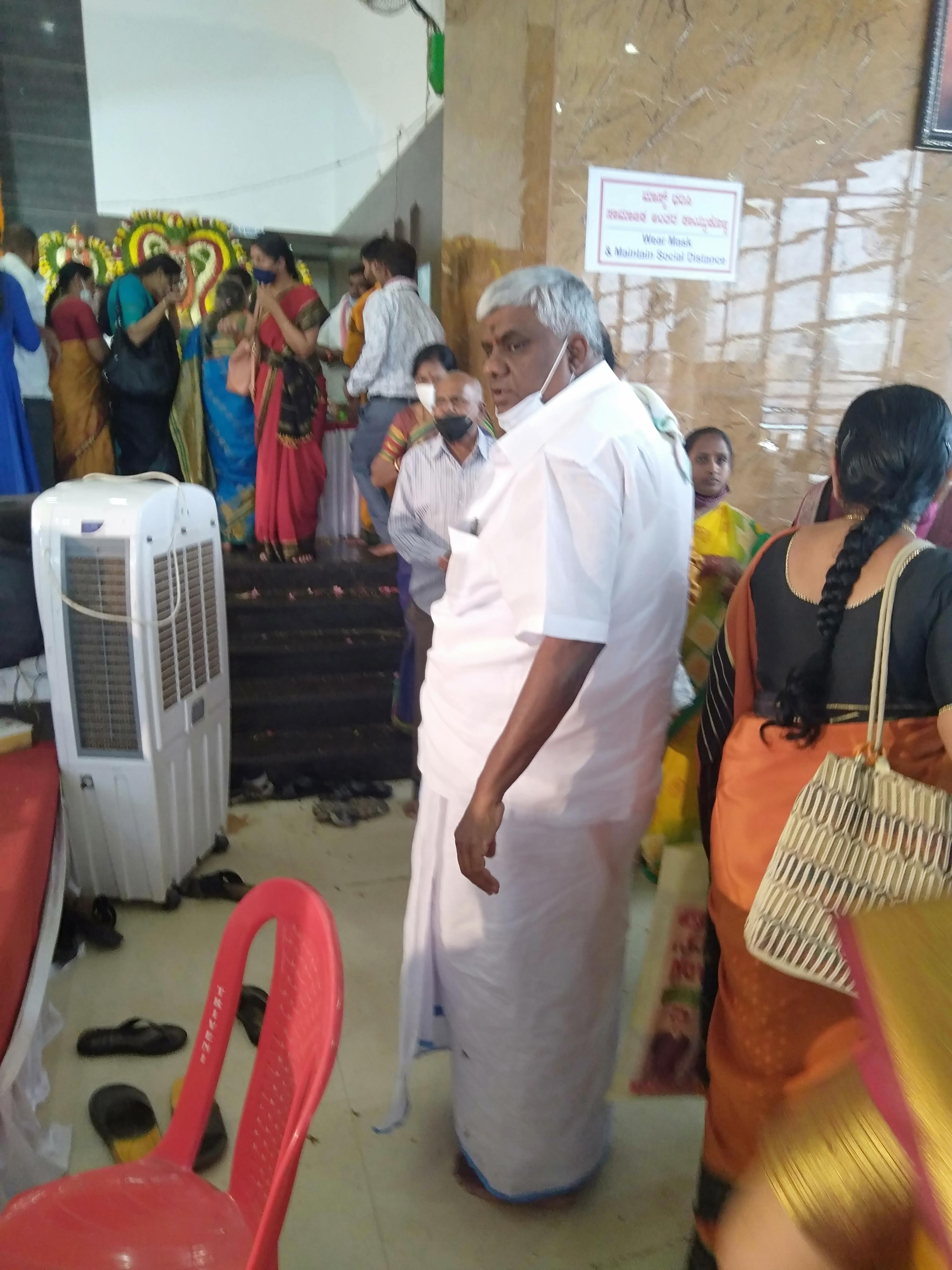
Revanna attending a private event.
