= H. A. Iqbal Hussain =

Indian politician

Member of the Karnataka Legislative Assembly
- Incumbent
- Assumed office 2023
- Preceded by: Anitha Kumaraswamy
- Constituency: Ramanagara

Personal details
- Born: Ramanagara
- Party: Indian National Congress
- Spouse: Fouzia Khanum
- Children: 3
- Parent: H. A. Abdul Basheer

H. A. Iqbal Hussain is an Indian politician from Karnataka. He is currently serving as a member of the Karnataka Legislative Assembly representing Ramanagara and is affiliated to the Indian National Congress.

== Political career ==
In the 2018 Karnataka Legislative Assembly election Iqbal Hussain contested from Ramanagara and lost to H. D. Kumaraswamy who is from the JDS.

In the 2023 Karnataka Legislative Assembly election he contested again from Ramanagara and won the seat with a margin of 5.86%.
