= H. D. Deve Gowda =

Former Prime Minister of India

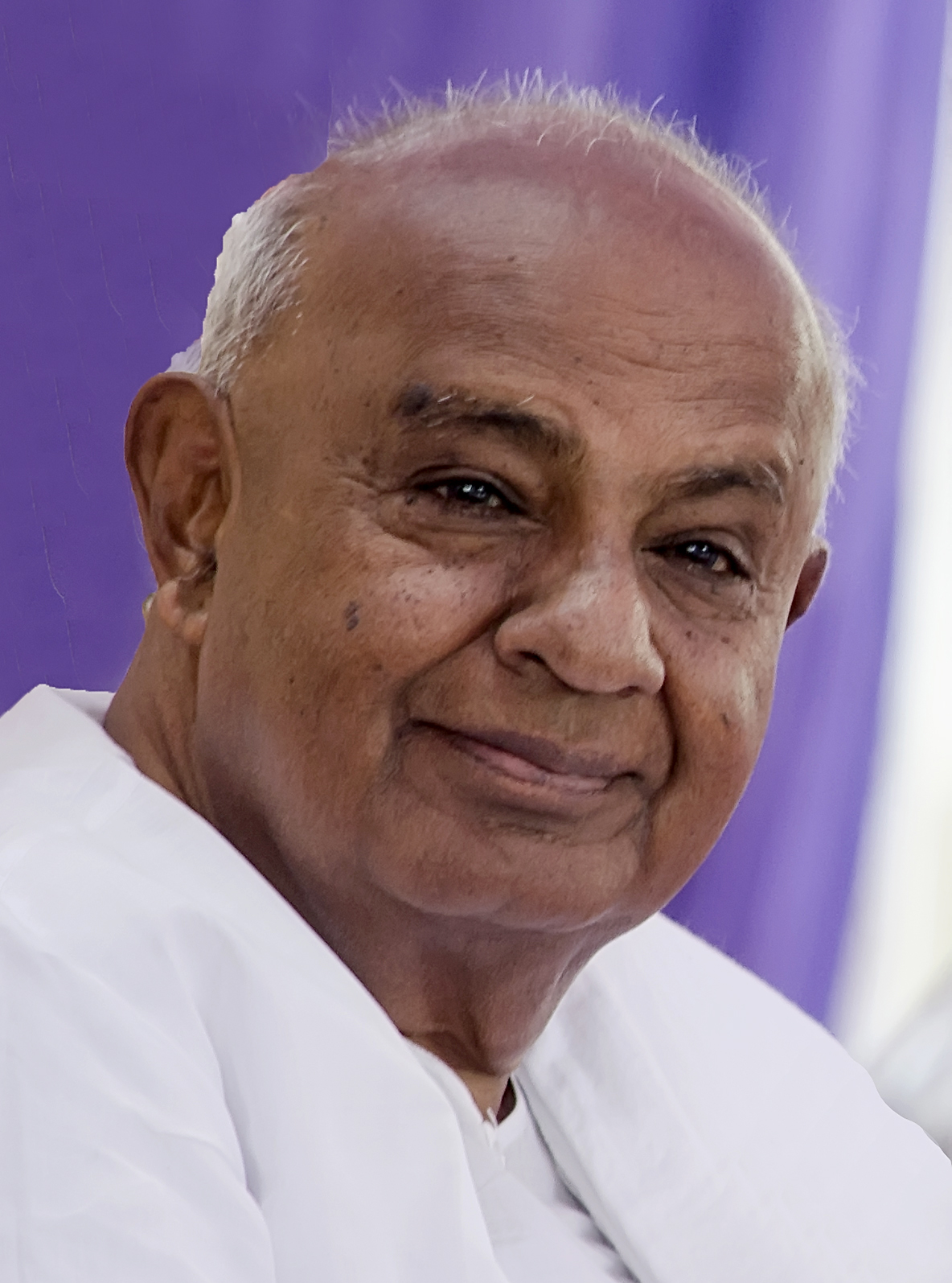
- Deve Gowda in 2017

Prime Minister of India
- In office 1 June 1996 – 21 April 1997
- President: Shankar Dayal Sharma
- Vice President: K. R. Narayanan
- Preceded by: Atal Bihari Vajpayee
- Succeeded by: Inder Kumar Gujral

Union Minister of Home Affairs
- In office 1 June 1996 – 28 June 1996
- Prime Minister: Himself
- Preceded by: Murli Manohar Joshi
- Succeeded by: Indrajit Gupta

Member of Parliament, Rajya Sabha
- In office 26 June 2020 – 25 June 2026
- Preceded by: D. Kupendra Reddy
- Succeeded by: M. Nagaraj
- Constituency: Karnataka
- In office 23 September 1996 – 2 March 1998
- Preceded by: Leeladevi Renuka Prasad
- Succeeded by: A. Lakshmisagar
- Constituency: Karnataka

Member of Parliament, Lok Sabha
- In office 17 May 2004 – 23 May 2019
- Preceded by: G. Puttaswamy Gowda
- Succeeded by: Prajwal Revanna
- Constituency: Hassan, Karnataka
- In office 2 February 2002 – 16 May 2004
- Preceded by: M. V. Chandrashekara Murthy
- Succeeded by: Tejashwini Sreeramesh
- Constituency: Kanakapura, Karnataka
- In office 10 March 1998 – 26 April 1999
- Preceded by: Rudresh Gowda
- Succeeded by: G. Puttaswamy Gowda
- Constituency: Hassan, Karnataka
- In office 20 June 1991 – 11 December 1994
- Preceded by: H. C. Srikantaiah
- Succeeded by: Rudresh Gowda
- Constituency: Hassan, Karnataka

8th Chief Minister of Karnataka
- In office 11 December 1994 – 31 May 1996
- Governor: Khurshed Alam Khan
- Preceded by: Veerappa Moily
- Succeeded by: Jayadevappa Halappa Patel (who also deputy under him)

Member of Karnataka Legislative Assembly
- In office 1994 – 1996
- Preceded by: CM Lingappa
- Succeeded by: CM Lingappa
- Constituency: Ramanagara
- In office 1962 – 1989
- Preceded by: Y. Veerappa
- Succeeded by: G. Puttaswamy Gowda
- Constituency: Holenarasipur

President of Janata Dal (Secular)
- Incumbent
- Assumed office July 1999
- Preceded by: Office established

Personal details
- Born: Haradanahalli Doddegowda Deve Gowda; 18 May 1933 (age 93) Haradanahalli, Kingdom of Mysore, British India (present-day Karnataka, India)
- Party: Janata Dal (Secular) (1999–present)
- Other political affiliations: National Democratic Alliance (2007–2008; 2023–present); Janata Dal (1990–1999); Janata Party (1977–1990); Indian National Congress (Organisation) (1972–1976); UOP (1976–1977); Indian National Congress (1953–1962)
- Spouse: Chennamma (m. 1954; died 2026)
- Children: 6 (H. D. Balakrishna H. D. Revanna H. D. Kumaraswamy H. D. Ramesh Anasuya Manjunath H. D. Shylaja)
- Relatives: Bhavani Revanna {(daughter-in-law)} Anitha Kumaraswamy (daughter-in-law) and C. N. Manjunath (son-in-law)
- Education: Diploma in Civil Engineering, L. V. Polytechnic, Hassan
- Profession: Politician; agriculturist; civil engineer
- Website: hddevegowda.in
- Nicknames: Mannina Maga; Dodda Gowdaru

Haradanahalli Doddegowda Deve Gowda (born 18 May 1933) is an Indian politician who served as the Prime minister of India for nearly 11 months, from 1996 to 1997, and previously as the Chief minister of Karnataka (1994 – 1996) and a Member of Parliament (MP) in the Lok Sabha. A member of the Janata Dal (Secular), he has been serving as the party's president since 1999 and has been an MP in the Rajya Sabha representing Karnataka since 2020.

Born in a family of farmers, Deve Gowda joined the Indian National Congress (INC) in 1953 and remained a member until 1962. He became president of the state unit of the Janata Dal in 1994 and was considered to be a driving force in the party's victory in Karnataka. He served as the chief minister of Karnataka from 1994 to 1996. In the 1996 general elections, no party won enough seats to form a government and Deve Gowda was elected to serve as prime minister as head of the United Front coalition. His premiership lasted for less than a year and he left office in April 1997. After his prime ministerial tenure, he was re-elected to the Lok Sabha as a Member of Parliament until his defeats in 1999 and 2019. Deve Gowda was elected to the Rajya Sabha in 2020.

Following the death of former Prime Minister Manmohan Singh in 2024, Gowda became the only living former Prime Minister of India and held several meetings individually with PM Narendra Modi.

== Early life and career ==
H. D. Deve Gowda was born on 18 May 1933 in Haradanahalli, a village in Holenarasipura Taluk, of the erstwhile Kingdom of Mysore (now in Hassan, Karnataka). His father Dodde Gowda was a paddy farmer and his mother, Devamma was a home maker. He is from the dominant Vokkaliga community who consider him as their community leader.

Deve Gowda earned a diploma in civil engineering from L. V. Polytechnic, Hassan, in the early 1950s.

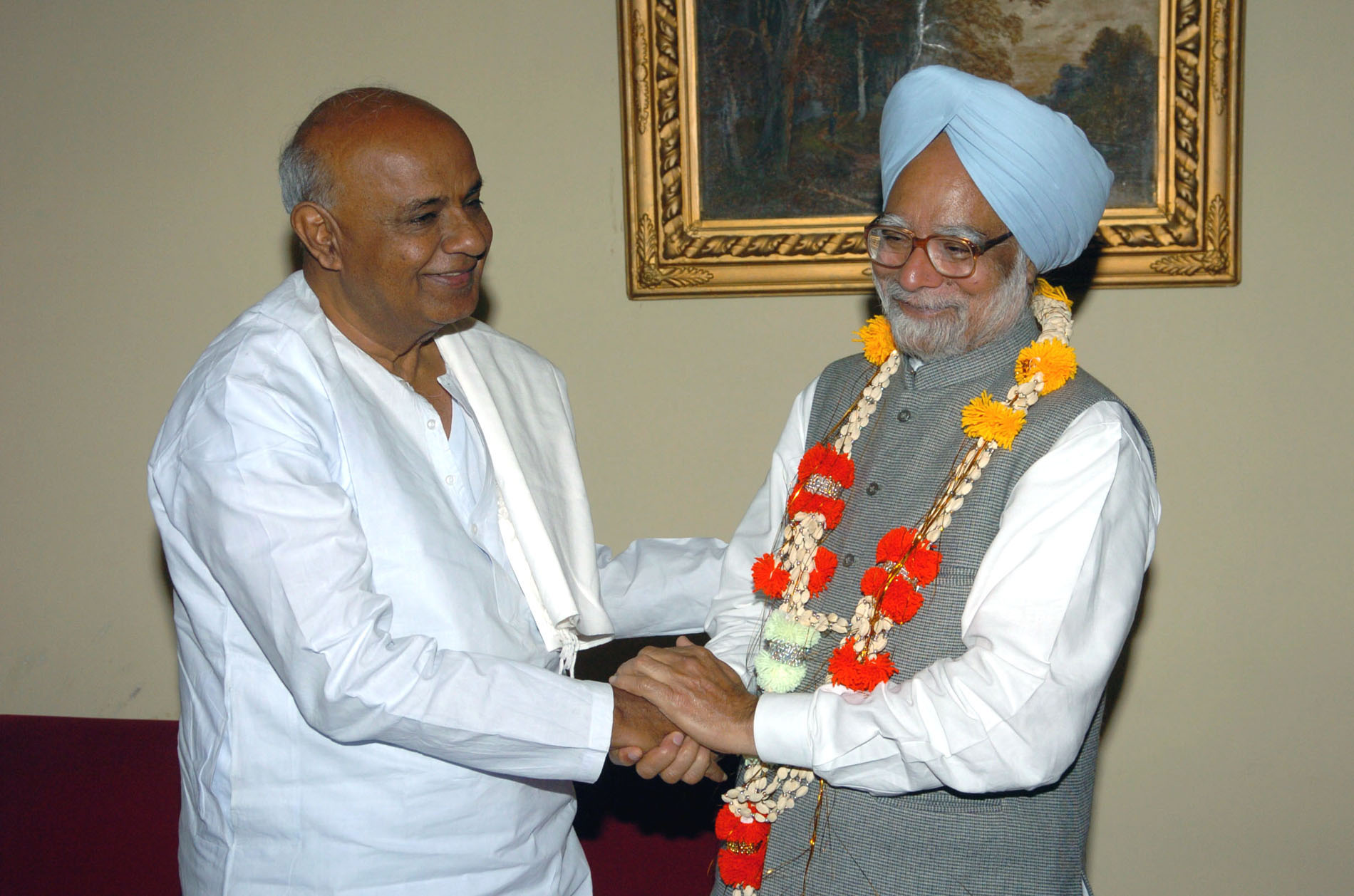
Deve Gowda and Manmohan Singh

Deve Gowda joined the Indian National Congress party in 1953 and remained a member until 1962. During that period, he was President of Anjaneya Cooperative Society of Holenarasipura and later became a member of the Taluk Development Board of Holenarasipura.

== State politics (1962–1996) ==
In 1962, Deve Gowda was elected to the Karnataka Legislative Assembly from Holenarasipura constituency as an independent candidate. Later, he was elected from the same constituency to the Assembly for six consecutive terms from 1962 to 1989. He joined the Congress (O) during the Congress split. He served as the Leader of the Opposition in the Legislative Assembly from March 1972 to March 1976 and from November 1976 to December 1977. During the Emergency in the 1970s, he was imprisoned in the Bangalore Central Jail.

Later, Deve Gowda served as the two-time president of the state unit of the Janata Party. He served as a minister in the Janata Party Government in Karnataka headed by Ramakrishna Hegde from 1983 to 1988. When V.P. Singh joined Janata Dal, Subramanian Swamy formed Janata Party (Jaya Prakash) faction, and Deve Gowda joined him to become Janata Party (JP)'s Karnataka President. He was later defeated from Holenarasipur in 1989, and soon later rejoined Janata Dal. He became president of the state unit of the Janata Dal in 1994 and led the party to victory in the 1994 State Assembly elections. He was elected from the Ramanagara, and sworn in as the 14th Chief Minister of Karnataka in December.

As chief minister, Gowda toured Switzerland and attended the Forum of International Economists. His tour to Singapore brought in foreign investment to the State. He resigned from the position to serve as prime minister following his appointment in 1996.

== Premiership (1996–1997) ==
Following the 1996 general elections, P. V. Narasimha Rao government was defeated with no other party winning enough seats to form a government.

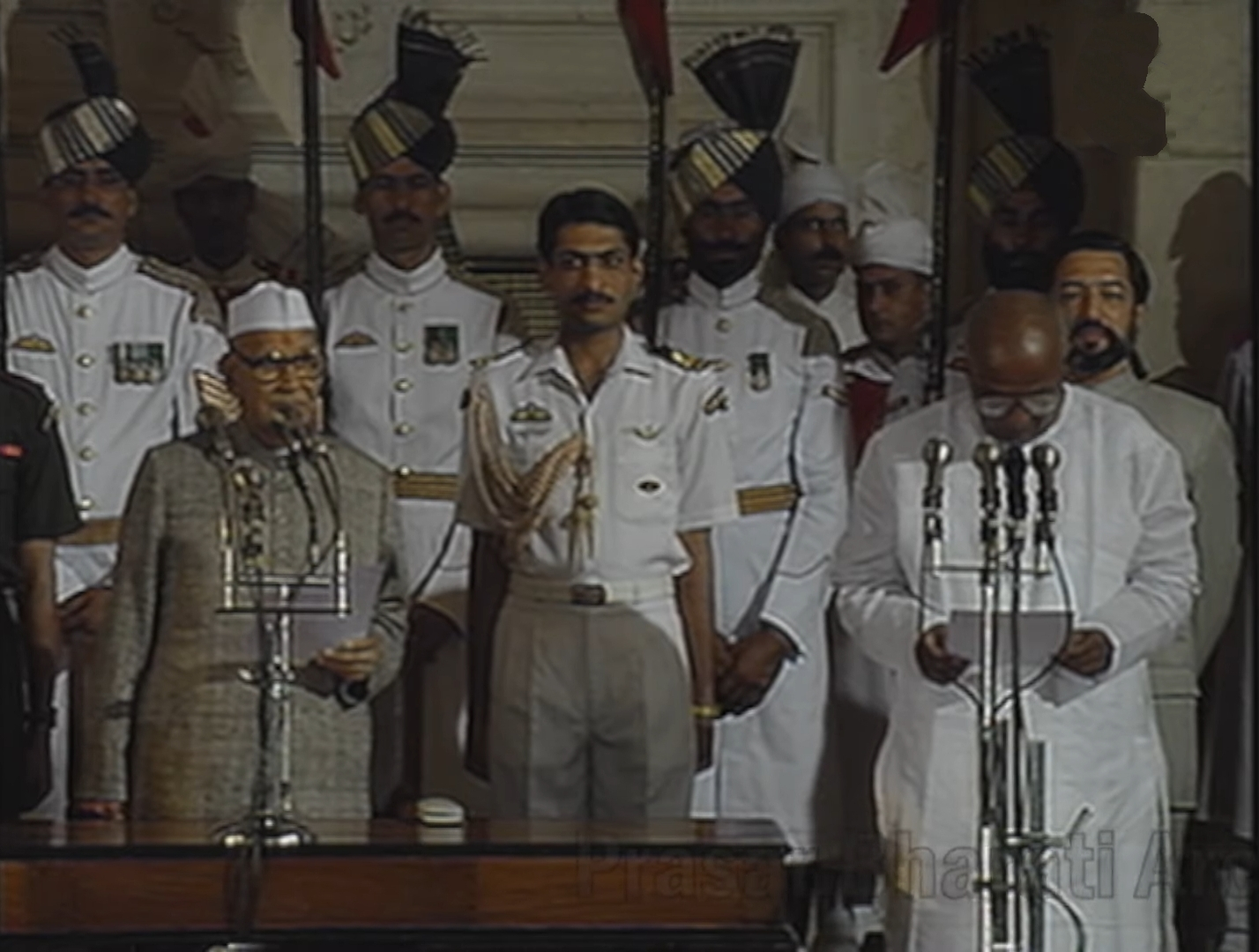
H. D. Deve Gowda taking the oath of office as India's 11th Prime Minister on 1 June 1996

When the United Front (a conglomeration of non-Congress and non-BJP regional parties) decided to form the Government at the centre with the support of the Congress and CPI(M), Deve Gowda was unexpectedly chosen to head the government after V. P. Singh and Jyoti Basu declined. He was sworn in as the 11th Prime Minister of India in June 1996 and was elected to the Rajya Sabha in September 1996 during his tenure as prime minister after Indira Gandhi's tenure in Rajya Sabha. During his tenure, he served as the Home Minister and as the Chairman of the Steering Committee of the United Front, the policy-making committee consisting of other coalition party leaders. He is credited with providing financial closure and kickstarting development of the Delhi Metro Project. He left office on 21 April 1997 after the Congress revoked its support for Gowda amidst discontent over communication between the coalition and the Congress. It compromised to support a new government under I. K. Gujral, who served as the prime minister from 21 April 1997 to 19 March 1998.

== Post-premiership (1997–present) ==
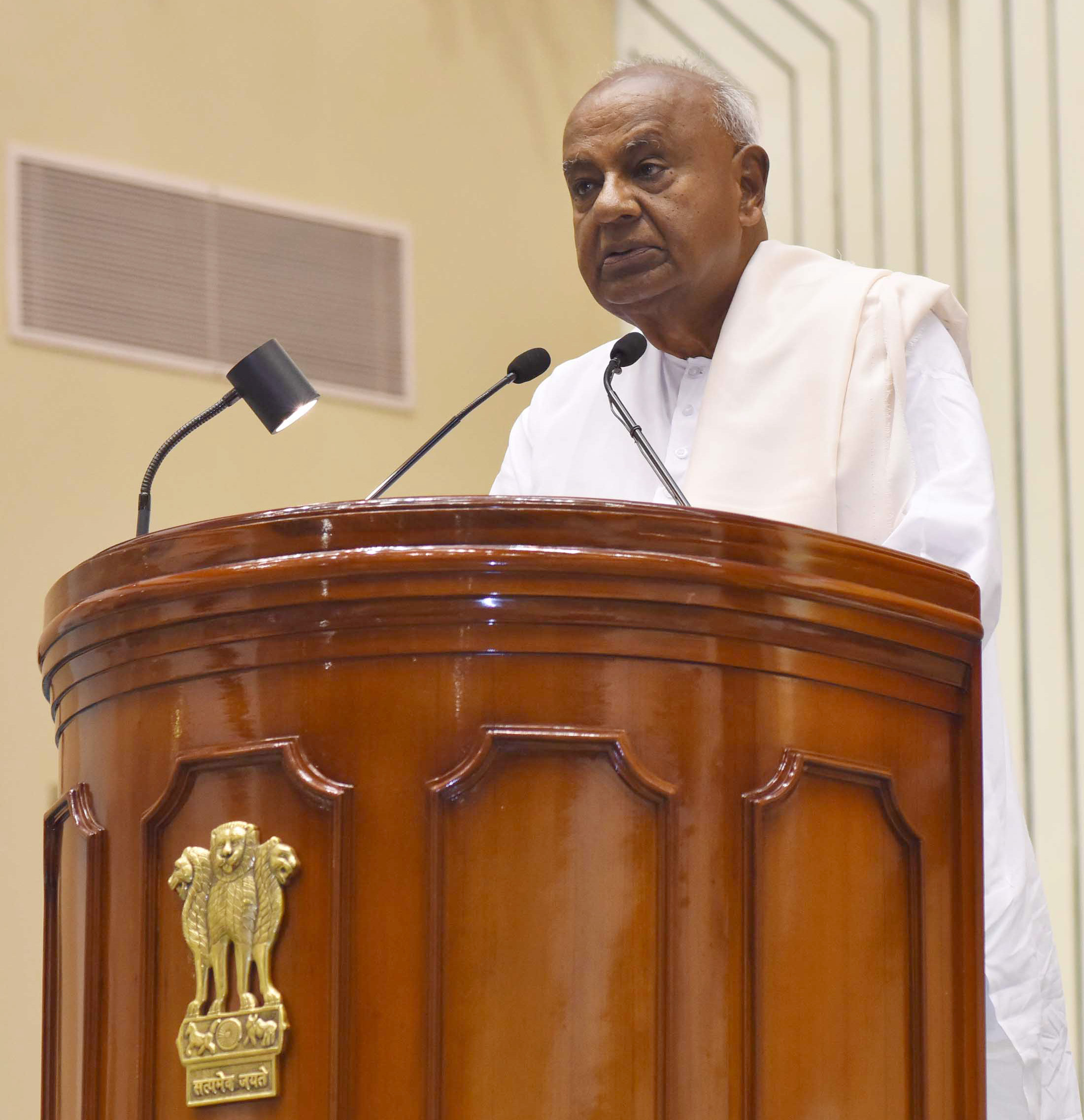
Devegowda c. 2018

He was defeated in the 1999 general elections by Congress's G. Putta Swamy Gowda in Hassan Lok Sabha constituency. He was elected the president of the Janata Dal (Secular) the same year. Subsequently, he won Kanakapura Lok Sabha by-poll in 2002 against D. K. Shivakumar.

The 2004 Karnataka state elections witnessed the revival of his party's fortunes under the leadership of Siddaramaiah with the Janata Dal (Secular) winning 58 seats and becoming a part of the ruling coalition with Congress. In 2006, 39 JD(S) MLAs pulled support from Congress-JD(S) coalition government and formed a new coalition government with BJP, against Deve Gowda's wishes. His son H. D. Kumaraswamy led the formation of this government and served as the chief minister of the state for 20 months.

Deve Gowda expelled Siddaramaiah from the JD(S) in 2005. Later, Siddaramaiah joined the Indian National Congress, which won the 2013 Karnataka Legislative Assembly election, with Siddaramaiah being elected as the Chief Minister of Karnataka. In 2018, Gowda played vital role with Sonia Gandhi to form INC-JDS combine rule.

Deve Gowda contested the 2019 general elections against G. S. Basavaraj in Tumkur Lok Sabha constituency of Karnataka. G. S. Basavaraj, BJP candidate of Tumkur Constituency won against Deve Gowda by a margin of 13,339 votes. G. S. Basavaraj polled 596,127 votes while Deve Gowda got 582,788 votes. He was elected to Rajya Sabha again in 2020.

== Personal life ==
He married Chennamma in 1954 and spent 72 years together until her death on 18 July 2026. They had six children together: four sons, including politicians H. D. Revanna who is PWD minister and H. D. Kumaraswamy, who is a former Chief Minister of Karnataka and current Union Minister, and two daughters. He is the father-in-law of politicians Anitha Kumaraswamy and C. N. Manjunath, and grandfather of actor-turned-politician Nikhil Kumaraswamy, politician Suraj Revanna, and former politician and convicted rapist Prajwal Revanna.

Gowda is a vegetarian. In 2024, he commented that "I was against cruelty towards animals and hence turned vegetarian more than 50 years ago. I’m diabetic and suffer from hypertension, so I want what I eat and keep it simple".

In 2025, Gowda was hospitalised in Bengaluru after he developed urinary tract infection.

== Electoral history ==
=== Legislative Assembly Elections ===
Legislative Assembly Elections
| Year | Constituency | Party | Result | Votes | Opposition Candidate | Opposition Party | Opposition votes | Ref |
|---|---|---|---|---|---|---|---|---|
| 1962 | Holenarasipur | IND | Won | 12,622 | H. D. Doddegowda | INC | 7,338 | |
| 1967 | Holenarasipur | IND | Won | 20,594 | H. D. Doddegowda | INC | 12,191 | |
| 1972 | Holenarasipur | INC(O) | Won | 26,639 | K. Kumaraswamy | INC | 20,475 | |
| 1978 | Holenarasipur | JNP | Won | 33,992 | K. Kumaraswamy | INC | 28,472 | |
| 1983 | Holenarasipur | JNP | Won | 37,239 | K. Kumaraswamy | INC | 28,158 | |
| 1985 | Holenarasipur | JNP | Won | 41,230 | G. Puttaswamy Gowda | IND | 38,063 | |
| 1985 | Sathanur | JNP | Won | 45,612 | D. K. Shivakumar | INC | 29,809 | |
| 1989 | Holenarasipur | JNP | Lost | 45,461 | G. Puttaswamy Gowda, | INC | 53,297 | |
| 1989 | Kanakapura | JNP | Lost | 45,461 | G. pgr Scindia | INC | 53,297 | |
| 1994 | Ramanagara | JD | Won | 47,986 | C. M. Lingappa | INC | 38,392 | |

=== Lok Sabha Election ===
Parliament Elections
| Year | Constituency | Party | Result | Votes | Opposition Candidate | Opposition Party | Opposition votes | Ref |
|---|---|---|---|---|---|---|---|---|
| 1991 | Hassan | JNP | Won | 2,60,761 | H. C. Srikantaiah | INC | 2,57,570 | |
| 1998 | Hassan | JD | Won | 3,36,407 | H. C. Srikantaiah | INC | 3,04,753 | |
| 1999 | Hassan | JD(S) | Lost | 2,56,587 | G. Putta Swamy Gowda | INC | 3,98,344 | |
| 2002 (bypoll) | Kanakapura | JD(S) | Won | 5,81,709 | D. K. Shivakumar | INC | 5,29,133 | |
| 2004 | Hassan | JD(S) | Won | 4,62,625 | H. C. Srikantaiah | INC | 2,72,320 | |
| 2004 | Kanakapura | JD(S) | Lost | 4,62,320 | Tejashwini Sreeramesh | INC | 2,72,320 | |
| 2009 | Hassan | JD(S) | Won | 4,96,429 | K. H. Hanume Gowda | BJP | 2,05,316 | |
| 2014 | Hassan | JD(S) | Won | 5,09,841 | A. Manju | INC | 4,09,379 | |
| 2019 | Tumkur | JD(S) | Lost | 5,82,788 | G. S. Basavaraj | BJP | 5,96,127 | |

=== Rajya Sabha ===
| Position | Party | Constituency | From | To | Tenure |
|---|---|---|---|---|---|
| Member of Parliament, Rajya Sabha (1st Term) | JD | Karnataka | 23 Sept 1996 | 2 March 1998 | 1 year, 160 days |
| Member of Parliament, Rajya Sabha (2nd Term) | JD(S) | Karnataka | 26 June 2020 | 25 June 2026 | 5 years, 364 days |

== Positions held ==
Positions Held by Shri H.D. Devegowda
| Year | Position | Description |
|---|---|---|
| 1962–1989 | Member, Karnataka Legislative Assembly | Seven terms |
| 1972–1976 | Leader of Opposition, Karnataka Legislative Assembly | |
| 1983–1989 | Minister, Public Works and Irrigation, Government of Karnataka | |
| 1985–1989 | Chairman, Public Accounts Committee, Karnataka Legislative Assembly | |
| 1991–1994 | Member, Tenth Lok Sabha | First term |
| 1991–1994 | Member, Committee on Commerce | |
| 1991–1994 | Member, Joint Parliamentary Committee on Fertilizers | |
| 1991–1994 | Member, Consultative Committee for the Ministry of Agriculture | |
| 1993–1994 | Member, Karnataka Legislative Assembly | |
| 1994–1996 | Chief Minister, Government of Karnataka | |
| June 1996–April 1997 | Prime Minister of India | In charge of multiple Ministries/Departments including Petroleum and Chemicals, Personnel, Public Grievances and Pensions, Atomic Energy, Home Affairs, Agriculture, Food Processing Industries, Urban Affairs, Employment, and Non-Conventional Energy Sources. |
| Sept. 1996 | Elected to Rajya Sabha | First term |
| Nov. 1996–April 1997 | Leader of the House, Rajya Sabha | |
| 1998–1999 | Member, Twelfth Lok Sabha | Second term |
| 2002–2004 | Member, Thirteenth Lok Sabha | Elected in bye-election, third term |
| 2004–2009 | Member, Fourteenth Lok Sabha | Fourth term |
| Aug. 2006–2008 | Member, Committee on Railways | |
| 2009–2014 | Member, Fifteenth Lok Sabha | Fifth term |
| Aug. 2009 | Member, Committee on Defence | |
| May 2014 – 2019 | Member, Sixteenth Lok Sabha | Sixth term |
| Sept. 2014–May 2019 | Member, Committee on Defence | |
| Sept. 2014–May 2019 | Member, Consultative Committee for the Ministry of Urban Development, Housing, and Urban Poverty Alleviation | |
| June 2020 | Elected to Rajya Sabha | Second term |
| July 2020–Sept. 2022 | Member, Committee on Railways | |
| Sept. 2022–June 2024 | Member, Committee on Water Resources | |
| Sept. 2022–Oct. 2024 onwards | Member, Consultative Committee for the Ministry of Agriculture and Farmer's Welfare | |
| Sept. 2024 onwards | Member, Committee on Rural Development and Panchayati Raj | |

== See also ==
- List of prime ministers of India
- List of chief ministers of Karnataka

Political offices
| Preceded by Atal Bihari Vajpayee | Prime Minister of India; 1996–1997 | Succeeded by Inder Kumar Gujral |
Party political offices
| Preceded by | Leader of the Janata Dal (Secular) Party in the 16th Lok Sabha; 2014–present | Incumbent |
