= Ramanagara Assembly constituency =

Legislative Assembly constituency in Karnataka, India

Coordinates: 12.72°N 77.28°E

Ramanagara
- Constituency No. 183 for the Karnataka Legislative Assembly

Constituency details
- Country: India
- Region: South India
- State: Karnataka
- District: Bangaluru South district
- Lok Sabha constituency: Bangalore Rural
- Established: 1951
- Total electors: 216,086 (2023)
- Reservation: None

Member of Legislative Assembly
- 16th Karnataka Legislative Assembly
- Incumbent H. A. Iqbal Hussain
- Party: Indian National Congress
- Elected year: 2023
- Preceded by: Anitha Kumaraswamy

Ramanagara Assembly constituency is one of the 224 constituencies in Karnataka Vidhan Sabha is one of the constituencies located in Bangalore south district.

It is a part of the Bangalore Rural Lok Sabha constituency, along with eight other assembly constituencies.

== Members of Legislative Assembly ==
Year	Member	Political party
Mysore State
1952	Kengal Hanumanthaiah	Indian National Congress
1957	Kengal Hanumanthaiah	Indian National Congress
1962	T. Madiah Gowda	Indian National Congress
1967	B. R. Dhananjiah	Independent
1972	B. Puttaswamaiah	Indian National Congress (O)
Karnataka
1978	A.K. Abdul Samad	Indian National Congress (I)
1983	C. Boraiah	Janata Party
1985	Puttaswamy Gowda	Janata Party
1989	C. M. Lingappa	Indian National Congress
1994	H. D. Devegowda	Janata Dal
1997 (Note: by-election, after H. D. Devegowda became the Prime Minister of India)	C. M. Lingappa	Indian National Congress
1999	C. M. Lingappa	Indian National Congress
2004	H. D. Kumaraswamy	Janata Dal (Secular)
2008	H. D. Kumaraswamy	Janata Dal (Secular)
2009 (Note: By-election was held after H. D. Kumaraswamy was elected to Mandya Lok Sabha constituency and vacated this seat trigerring by-election.)	K. Raju	Janata Dal (Secular)
2013	H. D. Kumaraswamy	Janata Dal (Secular)
2018	H. D. Kumaraswamy	Janata Dal (Secular)
2018 (Note: By-election was held after H. D. Kumaraswamy was elected in two assembly constituency and chose to retain Channapatna Assembly constituency and vacated this seat)	Anitha Kumaraswamy	Janata Dal (Secular)
2023	H. A. Iqbal Hussain	Indian National Congress

== Election results ==
=== Assembly Election 2023 ===
2023 Karnataka Legislative Assembly election : Ramanagara
Party	Candidate	Votes	%	±%
INC	H. A. Iqbal Hussain	87,690	47.98%	New
JD(S)	Nikhil Kumaraswamy	76,975	42.12%	▼43.96
BJP	Gautham Marilingegowda	12,912	7.07%	▼3.88
AAP	Byregowda. S	1,264	0.69%	New
NOTA	None of the above	880	0.48%	▼1.52
Margin of victory		10,715	5.86%	▼69.27
Turnout		182,891	84.64%	▲12.83
Total valid votes		182,750		
Registered electors		216,086		▲4.73
INC gain from JD(S)		Swing	▼38.10	

=== Assembly By-election 2018 ===
2018 Karnataka Legislative Assembly by-election : Ramanagara
Party	Candidate	Votes	%	±%
JD(S)	Anitha Kumaraswamy	125,043	86.08%	▲32.12
BJP	L. Chandrashekar	15,906	10.95%	▲8.11
NOTA	None of the above	2,909	2.00%	▲1.33
Purvanchal Mahapanchayat	H. D. Revanna	2,231	1.54%	New
Margin of victory		109,137	75.13%	▲61.94
Turnout		148,169	71.81%	▼11.17
Total valid votes		145,259		
Registered electors		206,329		▼0.32
JD(S) hold		Swing	▲32.12	

=== Assembly Election 2018 ===
2018 Karnataka Legislative Assembly election : Ramanagara
Party	Candidate	Votes	%	±%
JD(S)	H. D. Kumaraswamy	92,626	53.96%	▲6.59
INC	H. A. Iqbal Hussain	69,990	40.77%	▲7.82
BJP	Leelavathi	4,871	2.84%	▲1.83
NOTA	None of the above	1,144	0.67%	New
Margin of victory		22,636	13.19%	▼1.23
Turnout		171,758	82.98%	▲2.40
Total valid votes		171,652		
Registered electors		206,999		▲12.01
JD(S) hold		Swing	▲6.59	

=== Assembly Election 2013 ===
2013 Karnataka Legislative Assembly election : Ramanagara
Party	Candidate	Votes	%	±%
JD(S)	H. D. Kumaraswamy	83,447	47.37%	▼1.56
INC	Maridevaru	58,049	32.95%	▲1.77
BJP	Shivamadhu	1,776	1.01%	▼13.93
SDPI	Fairoz Ali Khan	1,368	0.78%	New
Independent	G. P. Shankaregowda	1,140	0.65%	New
Independent	Ravikumar	1,067	0.61%	New
Margin of victory		25,398	14.42%	▼3.33
Turnout		148,913	80.58%	▲10.20
Total valid votes		176,151		
Registered electors		184,802		▲4.71
JD(S) hold		Swing	▼1.56	

=== Assembly By-election 2009 ===
2009 Karnataka Legislative Assembly by-election : Ramanagara
Party	Candidate	Votes	%	±%
JD(S)	K. Raju	60,774	48.93%	▼7.16
INC	C. M. Lingappa	38,724	31.18%	▲12.66
BJP	Naraynagowda	18,556	14.94%	▼4.18
BSP	Mallkarjunaiah	1,646	1.33%	▼1.19
Independent	Haqulla Sharief	1,057	0.85%	New
Independent	S. Siddaramacahi	848	0.68%	New
Margin of victory		22,050	17.75%	▼19.22
Turnout		124,214	70.38%	▼3.24
Total valid votes		124,214		
Registered electors		176,483		▲1.46
JD(S) hold		Swing	▼7.16	

=== Assembly Election 2008 ===
2008 Karnataka Legislative Assembly election : Ramanagara
Party	Candidate	Votes	%	±%
JD(S)	H. D. Kumaraswamy	71,700	56.09%	▲1.94
BJP	M. Rudresha	24,440	19.12%	▲11.57
INC	Mamatha Hegade Nichani	23,678	18.52%	▼16.23
BSP	M. Kumara Swamy	3,218	2.52%	▲1.29
Independent	Y. E. Srinivasa	1,247	0.98%	New
Independent	G. H. Kumaraswamy	947	0.74%	New
Margin of victory		47,260	36.97%	▲17.57
Turnout		128,057	73.62%	▲8.16
Total valid votes		127,836		
Registered electors		173,939		▼11.36
JD(S) hold		Swing	▲1.94	

=== Assembly Election 2004 ===
2004 Karnataka Legislative Assembly election : Ramanagara
Party	Candidate	Votes	%	±%
JD(S)	H. D. Kumaraswamy	69,554	54.15%	▲32.72
INC	C. M. Lingappa	44,638	34.75%	▼7.34
BJP	Puttaswamy Gowda	9,700	7.55%	▼16.32
BSP	Shivanna. K. V	1,585	1.23%	New
Independent	Murthy Nayaka	1,382	1.08%	New
Margin of victory		24,916	19.40%	▲1.18
Turnout		128,456	65.46%	▼4.01
Total valid votes		128,454		
Registered electors		196,229		▲17.89
JD(S) gain from INC		Swing	▲12.06	

=== Assembly Election 1999 ===
1999 Karnataka Legislative Assembly election : Ramanagara
Party	Candidate	Votes	%	±%
INC	C. M. Lingappa	46,553	42.09%	▼9.31
BJP	D. Girigowda	26,400	23.87%	▲18.69
JD(S)	C. Honappa	23,701	21.43%	New
Independent	Shedhadri (Shashi)	8,111	7.33%	New
Independent	Puttaswamy Gowda	3,581	3.24%	New
JD(U)	Chandrashekar. B. K	2,258	2.04%	New
Margin of victory		20,153	18.22%	▲9.98
Turnout		115,625	69.47%	▼7.54
Total valid votes		110,604		
Rejected ballots		4,979	4.31%	▲3.31
Registered electors		166,450		▲8.85
INC hold		Swing	▼9.31	

=== Assembly By-election 1997 ===
1997 Karnataka Legislative Assembly by-election : Ramanagara
Party	Candidate	Votes	%	±%
INC	C. M. Lingappa	59,924	51.40%	▲16.80
JD	M. H. Amarnath Alias Ambarish	50,314	43.16%	▼0.09
BJP	D. Girigowda	6,043	5.18%	▼15.25
Margin of victory		9,610	8.24%	▼0.41
Turnout		117,762	77.01%	▼1.83
Total valid votes		116,582		
Rejected ballots		1,180	1.00%	▼0.26
Registered electors		152,923		▲7.29
INC gain from JD		Swing	▲8.15	

=== Assembly Election 1994 ===
1994 Karnataka Legislative Assembly election : Ramanagara
Party	Candidate	Votes	%	±%
JD	H. D. Deve Gowda	47,986	43.25%	▲29.95
INC	C. M. Lingappa	38,392	34.60%	▼27.83
BJP	D. Girigowda	22,664	20.43%	New
INC	Mohamed Afroz Ahamed	716	0.65%	New
Margin of victory		9,594	8.65%	▼30.97
Turnout		112,374	78.84%	▲2.62
Total valid votes		110,955		
Rejected ballots		1,419	1.26%	▼1.36
Registered electors		142,529		▲9.57
JD gain from INC		Swing	▼19.18	

=== Assembly Election 1989 ===
1989 Karnataka Legislative Assembly election : Ramanagara
Party	Candidate	Votes	%	±%
INC	C. M. Lingappa	60,275	62.43%	▲15.54
JP	C. Boraiah	22,022	22.81%	New
JD	Puttaswamy Gowda	12,843	13.30%	New
AIML	Mohamad Peer	751	0.78%	New
Margin of victory		38,253	39.62%	▲37.03
Turnout		99,144	76.22%	▲2.76
Total valid votes		96,548		
Rejected ballots		2,596	2.62%	▲1.29
Registered electors		130,079		▲21.87
INC gain from JP		Swing	▲12.95	

=== Assembly Election 1985 ===
1985 Karnataka Legislative Assembly election : Ramanagara
Party	Candidate	Votes	%	±%
JP	Puttaswamy Gowda	38,284	49.48%	▼12.54
INC	C. M. Lingappa	36,280	46.89%	▲10.84
Independent	Nazeer Ahamed Qureshi	1,467	1.90%	New
Independent	B. Boraiah	512	0.66%	New
Margin of victory		2,004	2.59%	▼23.38
Turnout		78,408	73.46%	▼6.77
Total valid votes		77,365		
Rejected ballots		1,043	1.33%	▼0.61
Registered electors		106,736		▲15.52
JP hold		Swing	▼12.54	

=== Assembly Election 1983 ===
1983 Karnataka Legislative Assembly election : Ramanagara
Party	Candidate	Votes	%	±%
JP	C. Boraiah	45,076	62.02%	▲29.93
INC	A. K. Abdul Samad	26,200	36.05%	▲13.21
Independent	Krishnappa	742	1.02%	New
Independent	Kunne Gowda	666	0.92%	New
Margin of victory		18,876	25.97%	▲15.27
Turnout		74,124	80.23%	▼0.81
Total valid votes		72,684		
Rejected ballots		1,440	1.94%	▲0.08
Registered electors		92,394		▲12.97
JP gain from INC(I)		Swing	▲19.23	

=== Assembly Election 1978 ===
1978 Karnataka Legislative Assembly election : Ramanagara
Party	Candidate	Votes	%	±%
INC(I)	A. K. Abdul Samad	27,837	42.79%	New
JP	C. Boraiah	20,875	32.09%	New
INC	C. M. Lingappa	14,856	22.84%	▼21.09
Independent	B. Boraiah	613	0.94%	New
Independent	Shivanna	442	0.68%	New
Independent	Thimmamma	425	0.65%	New
Margin of victory		6,962	10.70%	▼1.44
Turnout		66,279	81.04%	▲14.77
Total valid votes		65,048		
Rejected ballots		1,231	1.86%	▲1.86
Registered electors		81,783		▲10.74
INC(I) gain from INC(O)		Swing	▼13.28	

=== Assembly Election 1972 ===
1972 Mysore State Legislative Assembly election : Ramanagara
Party	Candidate	Votes	%	±%
INC(O)	B. Puttaswamaiah	26,775	56.07%	New
INC	A. K. Abdul Samad	20,978	43.93%	▲14.97
Margin of victory		5,797	12.14%	▼24.21
Turnout		48,940	66.27%	▲10.70
Total valid votes		47,753		
Registered electors		73,849		▲8.65
INC(O) gain from Independent		Swing	▼9.24	

=== Assembly Election 1967 ===
1967 Mysore State Legislative Assembly election : Ramanagara
Party	Candidate	Votes	%	±%
Independent	B. R. Dhananjiah	22,893	65.31%	New
INC	T. V. Ramanna	10,151	28.96%	▼25.10
Independent	S. Mahadevappa	1,174	3.35%	New
SSP	K. Gopal	834	2.38%	New
Margin of victory		12,742	36.35%	▲16.68
Turnout		37,770	55.57%	▼1.28
Total valid votes		35,052		
Registered electors		67,967		▲23.84
Independent gain from INC		Swing	▲11.25	

=== Assembly Election 1962 ===
1962 Mysore State Legislative Assembly election : Ramanagara
Party	Candidate	Votes	%	±%
INC	T. Madiah Gowda	15,517	54.06%	▼9.60
Independent	C. Ramaiah	9,870	34.39%	New
Independent	S. Chikkanna	1,924	6.70%	New
Socialist Party (India)	Krishna Gopal	1,393	4.85%	New
Margin of victory		5,647	19.67%	▼7.64
Turnout		31,200	56.85%	▼14.20
Total valid votes		28,704		
Registered electors		54,883		▲18.96
INC hold		Swing	▼9.60	

=== Assembly Election 1957 ===
1957 Mysore State Legislative Assembly election : Ramanagara
Party	Candidate	Votes	%	±%
INC	Kengal Hanumanthaiah	20,865	63.66%	▲4.47
Independent	B. T. Ramaiah	11,913	36.34%	New
Margin of victory		8,952	27.31%	▼3.65
Turnout		32,778	71.05%	▼3.91
Total valid votes		32,778		
Registered electors		46,135		▲23.02
INC hold		Swing	▲4.47	

=== Assembly Election 1952 ===
1952 Mysore State Legislative Assembly election : Ramanagara
Party	Candidate	Votes	%	±%
INC	Kengal Hanumanthaiah	16,640	59.19%	New
KMPP	B. T. Ramaiah	7,937	28.23%	New
Independent	M. B. Gurulingiah	2,401	8.54%	New
Socialist Party (India)	A. G. Venkatappa	1,135	4.04%	New
Margin of victory		8,703	30.96%	
Turnout		28,113	74.96%	
Total valid votes		28,113		
Registered electors		37,502		
INC win (new seat)				
