= D. Kupendra Reddy =

Indian politician, entrepreneur and social worker

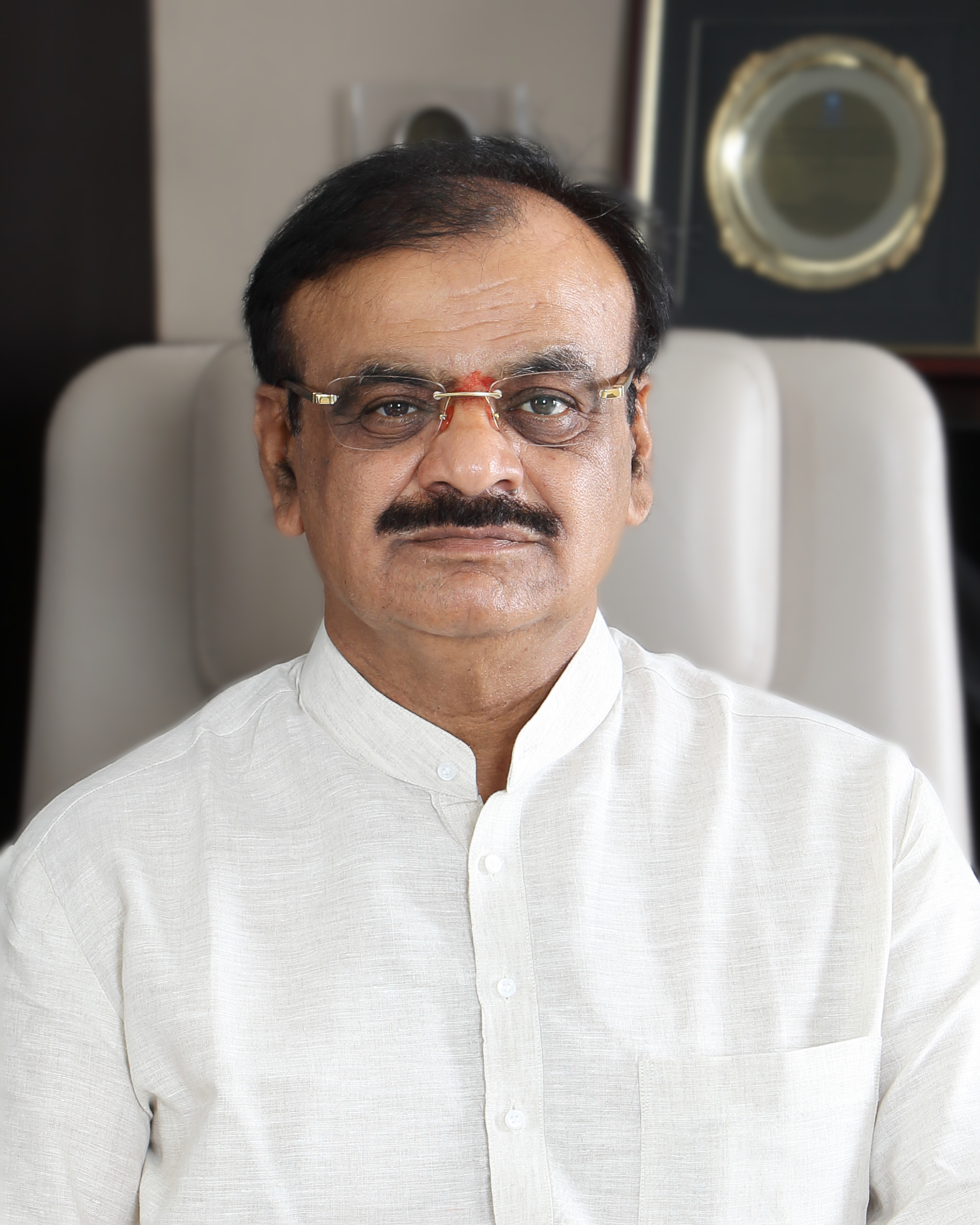
- Reddy in 2019

MP of Rajya Sabha for Karnataka
- In office 26 June 2014 – 25 June 2020
- Succeeded by: H. D. Deve Gowda
- Constituency: Karnataka

Personal details
- Born: 27 May 1960 (age 66) Bangalore, Karnataka, India
- Party: Janata Dal (Secular)
- Website: kupendrareddy.com

D. Kupendra Reddy (born 27 May 1960 Bangalore) an Indian politician, entrepreneur and a social worker. He is a former Member of Parliament in the Rajya Sabha, the upper house of the Parliament of India from 2014 to 2020. He is representing Karnataka from Janata Dal (Secular) party, a regional political party headed by H D Deve Gowda, former Prime Minister of India. .

== Political career ==
D Kupendra Reddy started his political career with Congress and was part of the party for almost 20 years. He moved to Janata Dal (s) and became the Member of Parliament in 2014. Kupendra Reddy has been actively involved on the floor of the parliament, asking one of the highest number of questions.

During the recent 2018 Karnataka State Elections, Kupendra Reddy played a key role in the post-election negotiations. JD(S) and Congress joined hands to form a coalition government, despite BJP emerging as the single largest party.

In January 2019, as part of the party's preparation for the general elections, JD(S) President, H D Deve Gowda announced the appointment of Kupendra Reddy as the in-charge for Bangalore urban and rural districts. Reddy's role was to interact with the workers and leaders of the party to coordinate the entire election campaign.

== Entrepreneurial career ==
Kupendra Reddy is in the business of construction and IT infrastructure development, addressing the Infrastructure requirements of the IT industry in Bengaluru and focuses on building technology parks. He established RGA Software Systems Pvt. Ltd. in the year 2000 and two other companies to execute and deliver these projects. He heads Sireesh Auto Pvt Ltd, authorized dealers for Mahindra & Mahindra Ltd in Bengaluru. Reddy also serves on the board of several other companies in various industries.

== Positions held ==
Member, Rajya Sabha, June 2014 - June 2020

Member, Committee on Commerce, September 2014 - August 2017

Member, Sub-Committee on Ease of Doing Business of the Committee on Commerce, April - December 2015

Member, Select Committee of Rajya Sabha on the Real Estate (Regulation and Development) Bill, 2013, May - July 2015

Member, Committee on External Affairs, September 2017 onwards

Member, Committee on Rules, June 2018 onwards

Member, Special Invitee to the Board of TTD Trust, September 2019 onwards

== Lake Conservation ==
Kupendra Reddy has been associated with the lake conservation movement of Bangalore and involved in the conservation process of lakes like Agara, Varthur and Bellandur. Apart from cleaning and restoration process, he has also suggested measures to maintain lakes using self-reliant measures.

In 2015 he filed a PIL in the High Court of Karnataka in W.P. No.58668/2015, titled as D. Kupendra Reddy versus State of Karnataka & Ors. The PIL argued for reducing the pollution in Bellandur lake and restore and rejuvenate it. This helped in getting judicial attention to the lake issue faced by Bangalore.

In 2017, he raised the Bellandur Lake issue with National Green Tribunal in application no. 217/2017, titled as D. Kupendra Reddy versus the State of Karnataka. NGT directed the state government and concerned authorities to prepare an action plan to control and prevent pollution of the Bellandur lake and initiate restoration and rejuvenation process. It also directed the Industries in the catchment area to be closed and the housing societies and upcoming buildings to construct sewage treatment plants (STPs).

Reddy has also requested the Central Government to include Bangalore lakes as part of the government's project of cage fish culture. Cage culture project is part of the Central Government's ambitious Blue Revolution and if implemented in Bengaluru lakes, it can help sustain the cleaning process and make the lakes self-reliant.

== Social Role ==
Reddy has donated land to the State Government to be used for public transport like roads and housing for the poor. He has helped in building marriage halls for public use and supported the renovation of temples.

== Personal life ==
D. Kupendra Reddy was born in Bengaluru, Karnataka to V.S. Dasa Reddy and Savithramma. He is married to R. Pushpavathi and resides in HSR Layout, Bangalore. They have two daughters and one son.
