= Haradanahalli =

- village
- Location in Karnataka, India Haradanahalli (India)
- Coordinates: 12°34′53″N 76°12′24″E
- Country: India
- State: Karnataka

Government
  - Type: Panchayat raj
  - Body: Gram panchayat

Languages
  - Official: Kannada
- Time zone: UTC+5:30 (IST)
- ISO 3166 code: IN-KA
- Vehicle registration: KA-13
- Website: karnataka.gov.in

Haradanahalli is a village in the Holenarasipur Taluk of Hassan District in the state of Karnataka, India. Haradanahalli is home town of 11th Prime Minister of India, H. D. Deve Gowda who was born on 18 May 1933 in Haradanahalli village.

== Notable Person ==
- H. D. Deve Gowda, 11th Prime Minister of India from June 1996 to April 1997.
- H. D. Revanna, Member of the Legislative Assembly in the Indian state of Karnataka
- H. D. Kumaraswamy, 8th Chief Minister of Karnataka
