= Nikhil Kumaraswamy =

Indian actor and politician

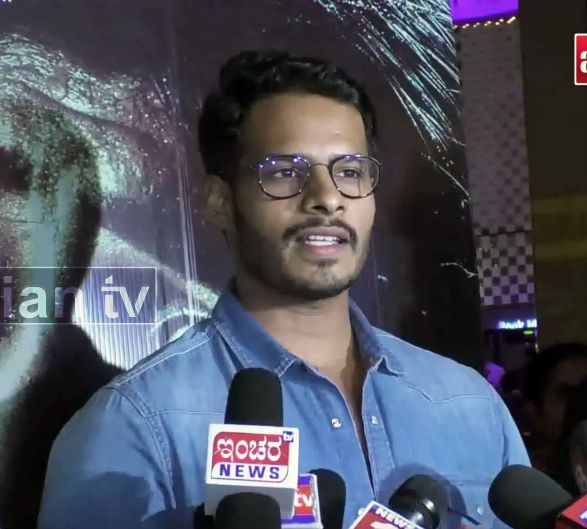
- Nikhil in 2019
- Born: 22 January 1988 (age 38); Bangalore, Karnataka, India
- Occupations: Actor; politician
- Years active: 2016–present
- Political party: Janata Dal (Secular)
- Spouse: Revathi (m. 2020)
- Children: 1
- Parent(s): H. D. Kumaraswamy (father); Anitha Kumaraswamy (mother)
- Family: H. D. Deve Gowda (grandfather); H. D. Revanna (uncle); Prajwal Revanna (cousin)

Nikhil Kumaraswamy (born 22 January 1988) is an Indian politician and actor known for his work in Kannada films. He made his acting debut with the Kannada-Telugu bilingual film Jaguar (2016).

== Personal life ==
Nikhil Kumarswamy is the son of former Karnataka Chief Minister H. D. Kumaraswamy and grandson of former Indian Prime Minister H. D. Deve Gowda.

On 10 February 2020, Nikhil was engaged to Revathi, the grand-niece of Congress leader and realtor M. Krishnappa at the Taj West End Bangalore. The wedding took place on 17 April 2020 near Janapada Loka in Ramanagara. The couple has a son.

== Political career ==
Nikhil ran in the 2019 Indian general election in Karnataka from the Mandya Lok Sabha constituency, as a Janata Dal (Secular) candidate. Mandya was considered a safe bastion for the erstwhile Congress-JDS alliance as historically, Indian National Congress was the most successful party, followed by Janata Dal (Secular) to contest in the district. He lost in the elections to Sumalatha, who was married to the late Kannada veteran Ambareesh, by a margin of 128,876 votes.

He contested in the 2023 Karnataka Legislative Assembly election, from Ramanagara where his father H. D. Kumaraswamy, mother Anitha and grandfather H. D. Devegowda had previously represented. In spite of all these he conceded defeat against Iqbal Hussain from Congress by a margin of 11,000 votes.

He contested in the bypolls held in Channapatna in November 2024. This assembly seat was vacant after his father H. D. Kumaraswamy, who was elected to the Karnataka Legislative Assembly in the 2023 State Assembly Elections, went on to contest the 2024 General Elections from Mandya and was victorious in the same. Nikhil conceded defeat to C. P. Yogeshwara, candidate of the Indian National Congress party.

== Electoral statistics ==
Year	Election	Constituency Name	Party	Result	Votes gained	Vote share%	Margin	Ref
2019	Indian General Election	Mandya	JDS	Lost	5,77,784	41.89%	1,25,876	
2023	Karnataka Assembly General Election	Ramanagara	JDS	Lost	76,975	42.12%	10,715	
2024	Karnataka Assembly Bye - Election	Channapattana	JDS	Lost	87,229	42.07%	25,413	

== Filmography ==
Key
†	Denotes films that have not yet been released

Year	Film	Role	Notes	Ref.
2016	Jaguar	Krishna	Debut Film; Simultaneously shot in Telugu	
2019	Seetharama Kalyana	Arya		
2019	Kurukshetra	Abhimanyu		
2021	Rider	Surya		
TBA	Yaduveera †	TBA	Filming	
TBA	Untitled next †	TBA	Filming	

== Awards ==
Year	Award	Category	Work	Result	Ref.
2017	South Indian International Movie Awards	Best Debutant Actor - Kannada	Jaguar	Won	
2017	South Indian International Movie Awards	Best Debutant Actor - Telugu	Jaguar	Nominated	
