= T. Madiah Gowda =

Indian politician

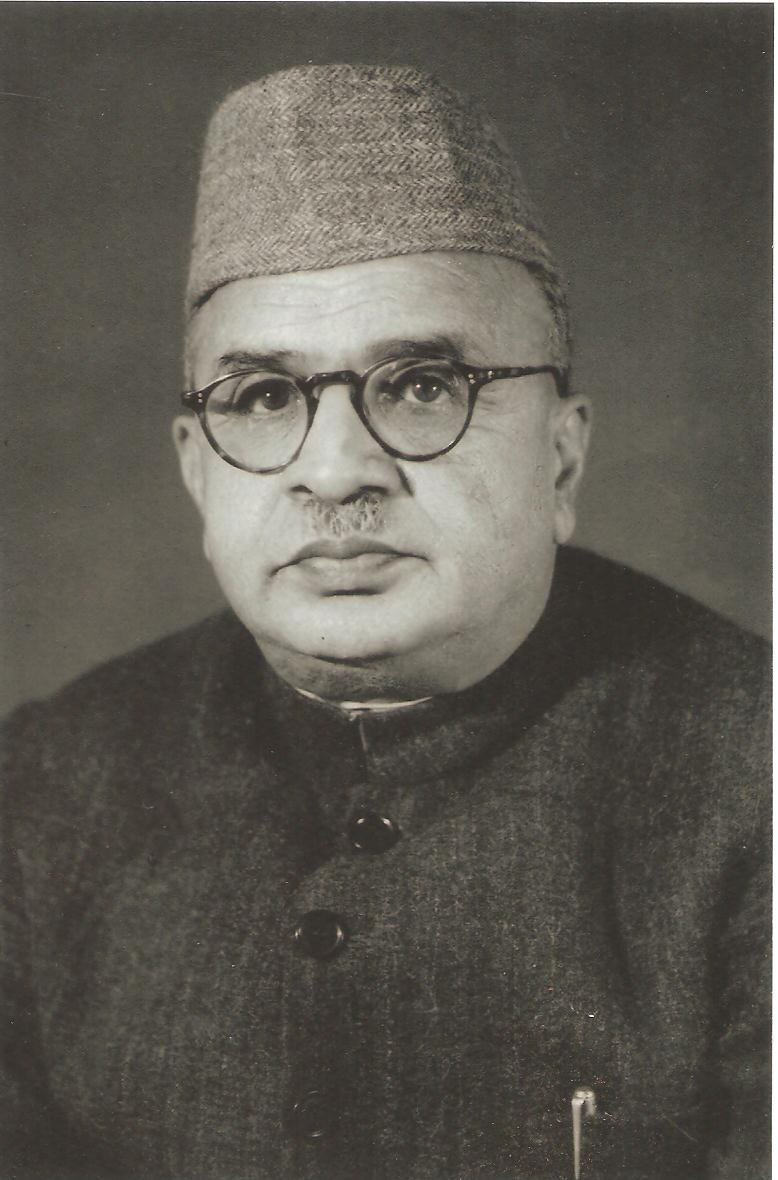

Member of Parliament, Lok Sabha
- In office 1952–1957
- Succeeded by: H. C. Dasappa
- Constituency: Bangalore City

Member of the Legislative Assembly
- In office 1962–1968
- Preceded by: K. Hanumanthaiya
- Succeeded by: B. R. Dhananjiah
- Constituency: Ramanagara

Personal details
- Born: 17 March 1896 Channapatna, British India (Now Karnataka, India)
- Died: 24 May 1971 (aged 75)
- Party: Indian National Congress
- Spouse: Shrimati Sharadamma

Thimmasandra Madiah Gowda (17 March 1896 – 24 May 1971) was an Indian politician. He was elected to the Lok Sabha, the Lower House of the Parliament, from Bangalore south constituency in 1952 as a member of parliament from Indian National Congress. He was also Member of the Legislative Assembly (MLA) from Ramanagara between 1962 and 1967.

== Education ==
Madiah Gowda pursued his earlier education in the Government High School at Channapatna and later graduated in arts from the Central College, Bengaluru. He was then awarded LLB from ILS Law College, Pune, where a later chief minister of Karnataka, S Nijalingapa, was a contemporary.

== Political career ==
Madiah Gowda was involved in political activities with the Indian National Congress in Ramanagara earlier known as Closepet prior to independence of India. After independence, he was elected as a member of the First Lok Sabha from the Bangalore South constituency in 1952. He was elected to the Legislative Assembly of Karnataka from the Ramanagara constituency in 1962.

Madiah Gowda also served in Mysore Representative Assembly, Mysore Legislative Council, Mysore Constituent Assembly and Mysore Legislative Assembly. He enabled the building of many schools, colleges and hospitals across his constituency and also took part in the development of various agricultural, irrigation and industrial projects.

== Posts held ==
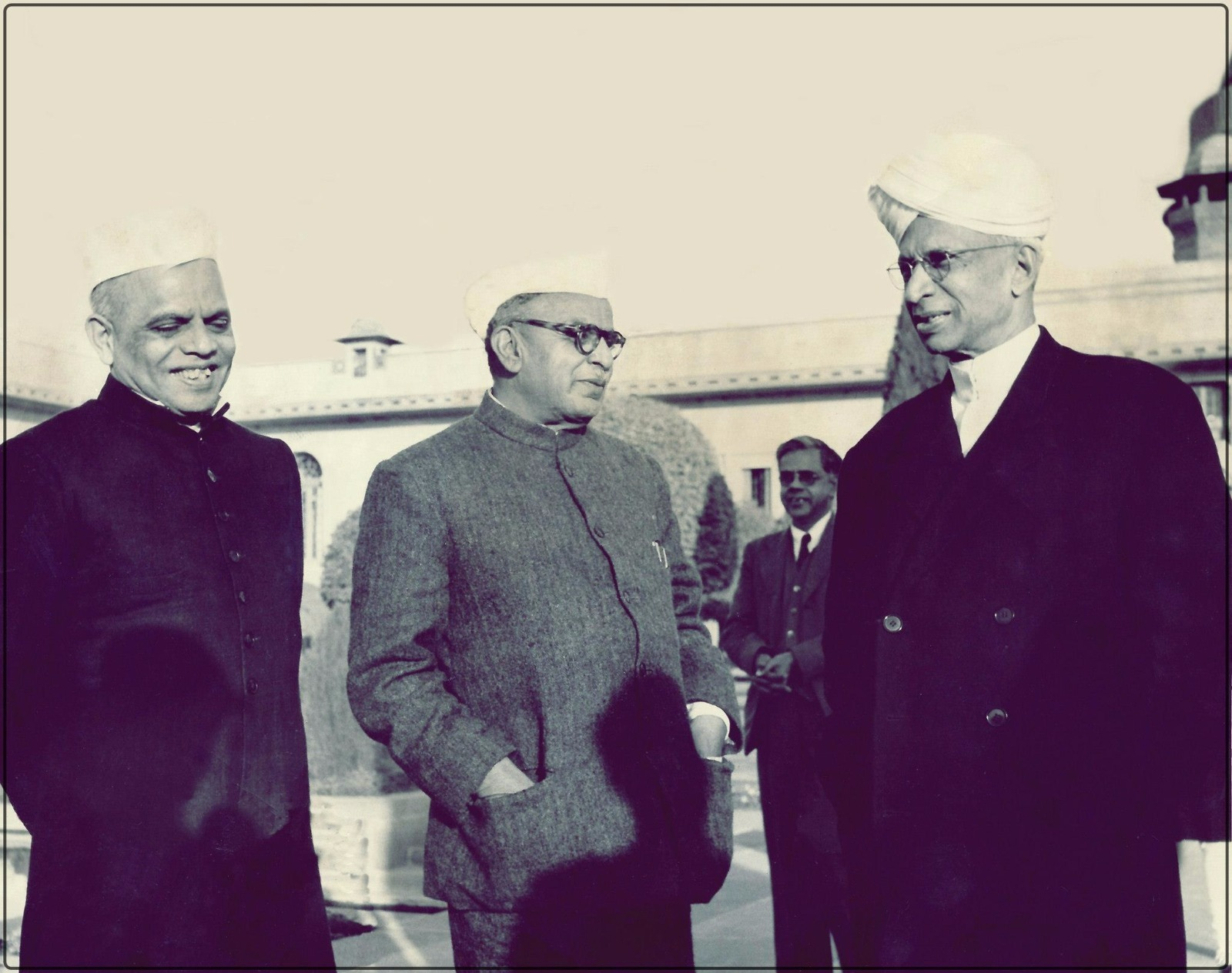
T. Madiah Gowda with Sarvapalli Radhakrishnan Second president of India.

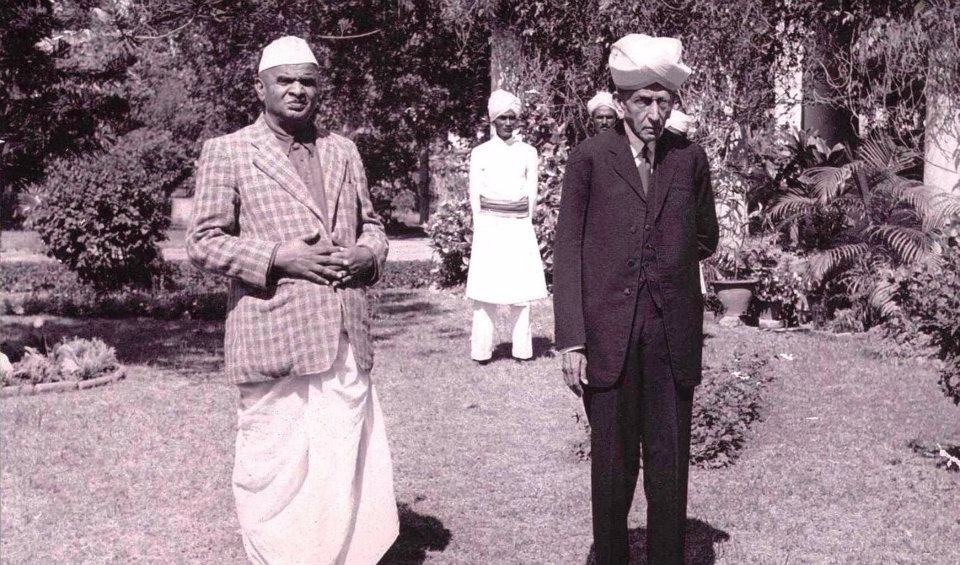
T. Madiah Gowda with Sir M. Visvesvaraya

Mr Gowda became an advocate after completing his law degree. during his career period he worked as advocate for Mysore University Council, University senate, Secondary education board, School board of adult education council, Rural development committees, and Co-operative societies and participated in many seminars on the agricultural and experimental union, Sir M Visvesvaraya Rural Industrialising Scheme activities and cottage industries programs. He was a member of the Ramanagara Municipal Council, Bangalore District Board and Bangalore Local Education Board.

He was the president of Mysore State Adult Education Council from 1947 and later he became vice-president of the Indian Adult Education Association. He was a District Scouts commissioner and later became chairman of Bangalore Rural district. He was also a member of Bangalore district rural development committee.
