= G. Puttaswamy Gowda =

Indian politician

Personal details
- Born: 20 December 1935 Keragodu, Distt. Hassan (Karnataka)
- Died: 18 August 2006 (aged 70)
- Party: Indian National Congress
- Spouse: Smt. P. Shantamma (03 May 1962)
- Children: 1 son and 1 daughter
- Parent: Shri Patel Gidde Gowda (father) Smt. Sannamma (mother)
- Profession: Agriculturist, Horticulturist, Industrialist

Gaurang Puttaswamy Gowda (20 December 1935 - 18 August 2006) was an Indian politician and he represented Hassan in Lok Sabha the lower house of the Parliament of India. He defeated H.D. Deve Gowda, former prime minister of India in 13th Lok Sabha elections. He was a member of the Indian National Congress.

== Early life and background ==
Puttaswamy was born to Shri Patel Gidde Gowda and Smt. Sannamma on 20 December 1935, in Keragodu Hassan District of Karnataka. He completed his education Matriculate, Rashtra Bhasha Visharad from Bettadapura, Mysore District and Holenarsipura, Hassan District (Karnataka).

He served as a Member and President of the Taluk Development Board. He was also Director of H.D.C.C. Bank Limited in 1975 and Director of Karnataka State Co-Operative Marketing Federation.

== Personal life ==
G. Puttaswamy Gowda married Smt. P. Shantamma on 3 May 1962. The couple has 1 son and 1 daughter.

== Positions held ==
#	From	To	Position
1.	1975		Director, H.D.C.C. Bank Limited
2.	1972	1978	Member, Hemavathy Project Rehabilitation Committee, Hassan
3.	1979	1984	Member of Karnataka Legislative Council
4.	1978	1980	Member of Committee on Public Undertakings
5.	1980		Chairman of Estimates Committee
6.	1980	1982	Member of House Committee
7.	1982	1984	Chairman of Committee on Government Assurances
8.	1989	1994	Member of Karnataka Legislative Assembly
9.	1989	1993	Cabinet Minister, Karnataka; Cabinet Minister in the State Government: P.W.D., Irrigation, Agriculture; Health and Medical Education; Social Welfare and Horticulture
10	1999	2004	MP in 13th Lok Sabha from Hassan
11.	1999	2000	Member of the Committee on Agriculture; Member of Joint Committee on Offices of Profit; Member of Joint Committee on the Protection of the Plant Varieties and Farmers’ Rights Bill, 1999
12.	2000	2004	Member of Consultative Committee, Ministry of Textiles
