= Janata Dal (Secular) =

State political party in India

- Abbreviation: JD(S)
- President: H. D. Deve Gowda
- Chairman: H. D. Kumaraswamy
- Parliamentary Chairperson: H. D. Deve Gowda
- Rajya Sabha Leader: H. D. Deve Gowda
- Lok Sabha Leader: H. D. Kumaraswamy
- Founder: H. D. Deve Gowda
- Founded: July 1999 (27 years ago)
- Preceded by: Janata Dal
- Headquarters: JP Bhavan, 19/1, Platform Road, Seshadripuram, Bengaluru, Karnataka-560020
- Student wing: Student Janata Dal (Secular)
- Youth wing: Yuva Janata Dal (Secular)
- Women's wing: Mahila Janata Dal (Secular)
- Labour wing: Karmikara Janata Dal (Secular)
- Ideology: Social democracy Kannada nationalism
- Political position: Centre
- Colours: Green
- ECI status: State Party
- Alliance: National Alliance; NDA (2006–2007; 2024–present); Former Alliances: UPA (National) (2004–2006), (2018–2019); AIADMK+ (Tamil Nadu) (2006); LDF (Kerala) (2009–2026) (Note: 2024–2026 (rebel group))
- Seats in Rajya Sabha: 1 / 245
- Seats in Lok Sabha: 2 / 543
- Seats in Karnataka Legislative Assembly: 18 / 224
- Seats in Karnataka Legislative Council: 8 / 75
- Number of states and union territories in government: 0 / 31

Election symbol

Party flag

Website
- jds.ind.in

The Janata Dal (Secular) (transl. People's Party (Secular); abbr. JD(S)) is an Indian political party recognised as a state party in the Indian state of Karnataka. It was founded by the former prime minister of India H. D. Deve Gowda in July 1999 as a breakaway faction from the Janata Dal.

== History ==
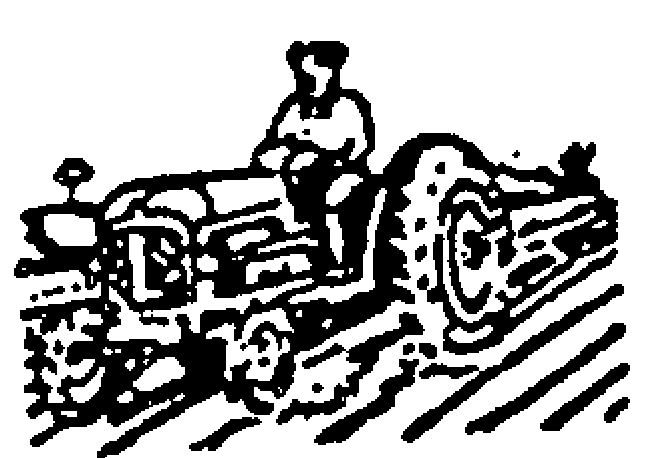
The First Election Symbol (Farmer Driving Tractor) used by Janata Dal (Secular), Until 25 December 2001

The Janata Dal (Secular), formed in 1999, had its origins in the Janata Party, founded in 1977 as a coalition of several smaller parties that combined forces to oppose the Indian National Congress. In 1988 the Janata Party and other smaller parties merged to form the Janata Dal. In 1996, Janata Dal reached its pinnacle when H. D. Deve Gowda became Prime Minister of India, heading the United Front (UF) coalition government.

The Janata Dal split in 1999, when a faction led by Chief Minister J. H. Patel lent support to the Bharatiya Janata Party-led National Democratic Alliance leading to the formation of Janata Dal (Secular) under H. D. Deve Gowda and Siddaramaiah. The Sharad Yadav faction of the Janata Dal, the Lok Shakti and the Samata Party merged as the Janata Dal (United). Even though the premise for the split was its opposition to allying with the National Democratic Alliance, H. D. Deve Gowda stayed equally away from the Indian National Congress from the outset.

The 2004 Karnataka Assembly election witnessed the revival of the party's fortunes with JD(S) becoming part of the ruling coalition in the state.

Kumaraswamy was made as Chief Minister of Karnataka from 4 February 2006 to 9 October 2007. On 27 September 2007, Kumaraswamy said that he would leave office on 3 October as part of a power-sharing agreement between the Janata Dal (Secular) and the Bharatiya Janata Party (BJP), despite the calls of some legislators in the JD(S) for him to remain in office for the time being, due to complications in arranging the transfer of power. However, on 4 October 2007, he refused to transfer power to the BJP. Finally, on 8 October 2007, he tendered his resignation to Governor Rameshwar Thakur, and the state was put under President's rule two days later. However, he reconciled later and decided to offer support to the BJP. BJP's B. S. Yeddyurappa was sworn in as the Chief Minister of Karnataka on 12 November 2007. But, again refused to support BJP government over a disagreement on sharing of ministries which resulted in Yeddyurappa resignation as Chief Minister on 19 November 2007.

After the untimely demise of Karnataka state JD(S) President Merajuddin Patel, he was elected unopposed as President of the state unit.

In 2013 Karnataka Legislative Assembly election, party gained Official Opposition (India) status, rather than ruling party BJP. Kumaraswamy is also known for accusing political rivals of corruption.

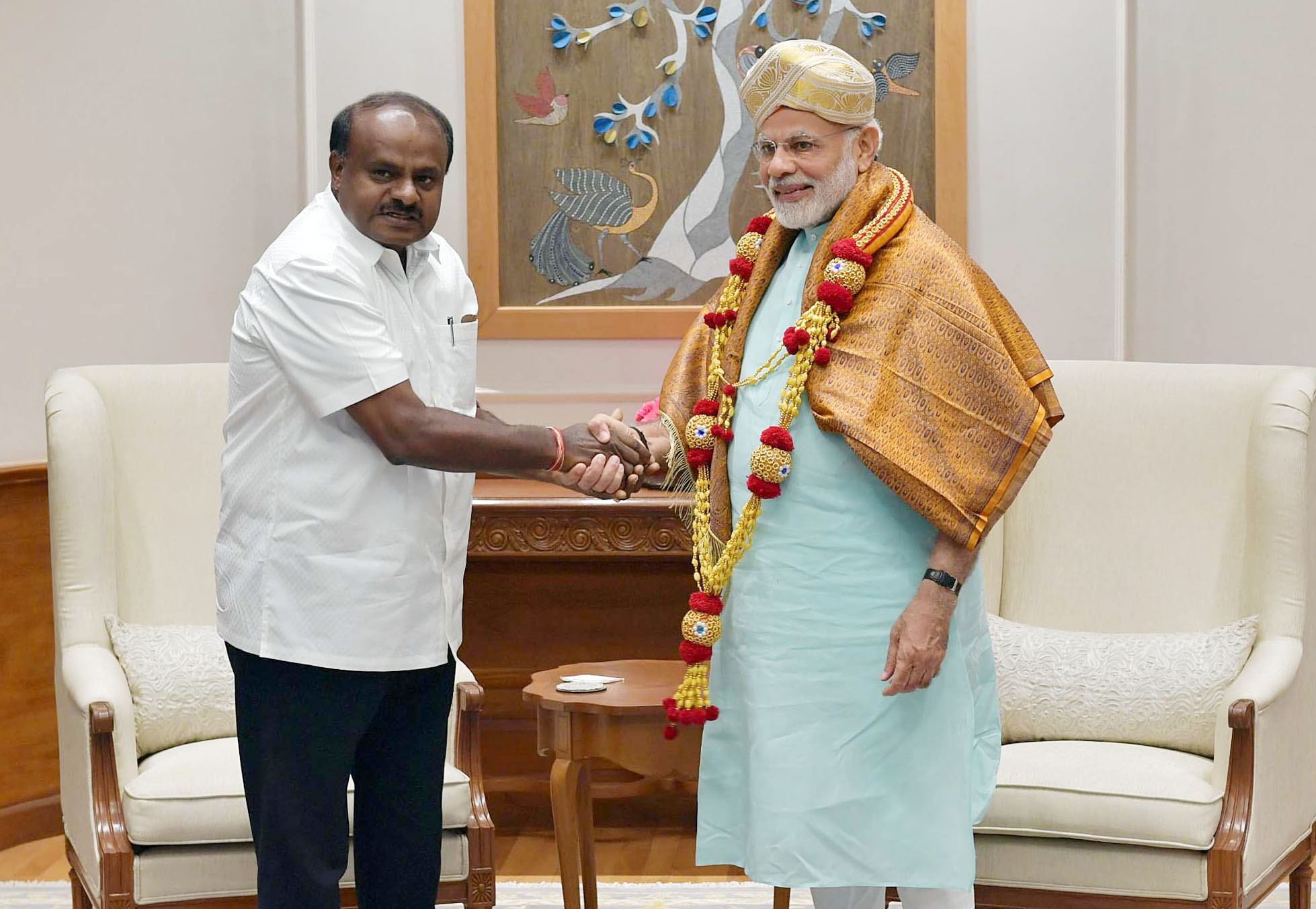
Kumaraswamy met Prime Minister Narendra Modi after becoming Chief Minister in May 2018

In 2018 elections in Karnataka state, JD(S) was the third-largest party but after a post-poll alliance with the Rahul Gandhi led Indian National Congress, kumaraswamy was sworn in as the Chief Minister for 2nd term on 23 May 2018.

In the 2019 parliament elections, Kumaraswamy son Nikhil Gowda contested in the Mandya (Lok Sabha constituency) against an independent candidate Sumalatha, wife of film actor Late Ambareesh. Kumaraswamy took this contest as a prestige and campaigned all across the constituency. In vain his son lost the election by a margin of 1,30,000 odd votes. Party's national president Devegowda also defeated in his new constiency Tumkuru. Then, PWD Minister H. D. Revanna's son Prajwell was only to manage to win in his family bastion.

On the month of July 2019, JDS government lost its majority when 13 MLAs of Congress and 3 MLAs of his own party resigned to their MLA Posts. BSP MLA Mahesh N & 2 Independent MLAs withdrew their support for H.D.Kumaraswamy led coalition Government in Karnataka. On 23 July Kumaraswamy lost his majority in Karnataka floor test. Kumaraswamy resigned to the Chief Minister post, by submitting his resignation letter to governor Vajubhai Vala on 23 July 2019. Then BJP was invited to form the government as the single largest party, by the governor and B. S.Yediyurappa took oath as the Chief Minister of Karnataka by succeeding him.

In the 2023 Karnataka Assembly Elections, it was managed to win 19 seats of the contested 204 seats in the same elections. It has a political presence mainly in Karnataka and is in decline. In September 2023, JD(S) joined the BJP controlled National Democratic Alliance. In Kerala, the party had a small state unit which is part of the state government coalition, the Left Democratic Front. The state unit has refused to be part of the right wing NDA and are in rebellion against their national leadership for having joined hands with the BJP.

== Prominent members ==
- H. D. Deve Gowda, President of Janata Dal (Secular), Former Prime Minister of India and Former Chief minister of Karnataka
- H. D. Kumaraswamy, Union Minister of Heavy Industries of Government of India, Former Chief Minister of Karnataka and Karnataka State President of Janata Dal (Secular)
- H. D. Revanna, former cabinet minister, present MLA, Karnataka (son of H. D. Deve Gowda).
- Nikhil Gowda, state president, Yuva Janata Dal (Secular)
- B. M. Farooq, current MLC of Karnataka Legislative Council, current national general secretary of Janata Dal (Secular)
- C. S. Puttaraju, former minister for small irrigation resources, and former member of parliament, Lok Sabha from Mandya
- G. T. Devegowda, former minister for higher education, and member of the Legislative Assembly (MLA) from Chamundeshwari (Vidhana Sabha constituency
- Sharanagouda Kandakur is an Indian politician from Karnataka. He is an MLA from Gurmitkal Assembly constituency in Yadgir district representing Janata Dal (Secular).
- Oommen Thalavady, former MLA Kuttanad, Kerala Legislative Assembly
- Sarekoppa Bangarappa, former chief minister of Karnataka
- N. M. Joseph, vice president of Janata Dal (Secular)
- D. Kupendra Reddy, Former MP of Rajya Sabha
- Mathew T. Thomas, Kerala State president of Janata Dal (Secular) and former Kerala State minister
- Jose Thettayil, vice president of Janata Dal (Secular), former minister Govt. of Kerala.
- Neelalohithadasan Nadar, former Kerala State president of Janata Dal (Secular) (former minister Govt. of Kerala; former member of Parliament, Govt. of India)
- K. Krishnankutty, current Kerala State minister for electricity department

== Electoral performance ==
=== Assembly election history in Karnataka ===
Year	Seats contested	Seats won	+/-	Voteshare (%)	+/- (pp)	Outcome
1999	203	10 / 224	▲10	10.42	▲10.42	Opposition
2004	220	58 / 224	▲48	20.77	▲10.35	Government
2008	219	28 / 224	▼30	18.96	▼1.81	Opposition
2013	222	40 / 224	▲12	20.09	▲1.13	Opposition
2018	199	37 / 224	▼3	18.3	▼1.79	Government, later Opposition
2023	209	19 / 224	▼18	13.29	▼5.01	Opposition

All time–JD(S) Karnataka Legislative Assembly seat count

=== Assembly election history in Kerala ===
Year	Assembly election	Seats contested	Seats won	Votes secured	Percentage of votes
2001	11th Assembly	12	3	546,917	3.48%
2006	12th Assembly	7	5	353,111	2.27%
2011	13th Assembly	5	4	264,631	1.52%
2016	14th Assembly	5	3	293,274	1.5%
2021	15th Assembly	4	2	265,789	1.28%

=== Lok Sabha election history ===
Election Year	Lok Sabha	Seats contested	Seats won	Overall votes	(%) of votes	(+/-) in seats	Vote swing
Lok Sabha
1999	13th	96	1 / 543	33,32,702	0.91%	▲1	new
2004	14th	43	3 / 543	57,32,296	1.47%	▲2	▲0.56
2009	15th		3 / 543			Steady	
2014	16th		2 / 543			▼1	
2019	17th		1 / 543			▼1	
2024	18th		2 / 543			▲1	

All time–JD(S) Lok Sabha seat count

== Legislative leaders ==
=== List of union cabinet ministers ===
No.	Portrait	Name (Birth–Death)	Portfolio	Term in office			Elected constituency (House)	Prime Minister
No.	Portrait	Name (Birth–Death)	Portfolio	Assumed office	Left office	Time in office	Elected constituency (House)	Prime Minister
1		H. D. Kumaraswamy (b. 1959)	Ministry of Heavy Industries	9 June 2024	Incumbent	2 years, 165 days	Mandya (Lok Sabha)	Narendra Modi
1		H. D. Kumaraswamy (b. 1959)	Ministry of Steel	9 June 2024	Incumbent	2 years, 165 days	Mandya (Lok Sabha)	Narendra Modi

=== List of chief ministers ===
==== Chief Ministers of Karnataka ====
No.	Portrait	Name (Birth–Death)	Term in office			Assembly (Election)	Elected constituency	Ministry
No.	Portrait	Name (Birth–Death)	Assumed office	Left office	Time in office	Assembly (Election)	Elected constituency	Ministry
1		H. D. Kumaraswamy (b. 1959)	3 February 2006	8 October 2007	2 years, 308 days	12th (2004)	Ramanagara	Kumaraswamy I
1		H. D. Kumaraswamy (b. 1959)	23 May 2018	23 July 2019	2 years, 308 days	15th (2018)	Channapatna	Kumaraswamy II

=== List of deputy chief ministers ===
==== Deputy Chief Minister of Karnataka ====
No.	Portrait	Name (Birth–Death)	Term in office			Assembly (Election)	Elected constituency	Chief Minister
No.	Portrait	Name (Birth–Death)	Assumed office	Left office	Time in office	Assembly (Election)	Elected constituency	Chief Minister
1		Siddaramaiah (b. 1947)	28 May 2004	5 August 2005	1 year, 69 days	12th (2004)	Chamundeshwari	Dharam Singh
2		M. P. Prakash (1940–2011)	8 August 2005	28 January 2006	173 days	12th (2004)	Hoovina Hadagali	Dharam Singh

== See also ==
- List of political parties in India
- Samata Party
