= Anitha Kumaraswamy =

Indian politician and businesswoman

Member of Karnataka Legislative Assembly
- In office 2018–2023
- Preceded by: H. D. Kumaraswamy
- Succeeded by: H. A. Iqbal Hussain
- Constituency: Ramanagaram
- In office 2008–2013
- Preceded by: G. Parameshwara
- Succeeded by: K. N. Rajanna
- Constituency: Madhugiri

Personal details
- Born: 16 December 1959 (age 66) Talagavara
- Party: Janata Dal (Secular)
- Other political affiliations: Janata Dal
- Spouse: H. D. Kumaraswamy (m. 1986)
- Children: Nikhil Gowda
- As of 13th May, 2023

Anitha Kumaraswamy is an Indian politician and businesswoman working in entertainment industry. Currently she is a member of the Karnataka Legislative Assembly from Ramanagara and earlier represented Madhugiri from 2008 to 2013. She belongs to Janata Dal (Secular) party. She is married to H. D. Kumaraswamy.

== Personal life ==
Anitha Kumaraswamy was born in Talagavara, Chintamani taluk, Chickballapur District of Karnataka. She married H. D. Kumaraswamy in 1986, and they have a son named Nikhil Gowda and is the daughter-in-law of former Prime Minister of India H. D. Deve Gowda.
