= Global Village Tech Park =

Technology park in Bangalore, India

Coordinates: 12.9203972°N 77.5042898°E

Sattva Global Citys
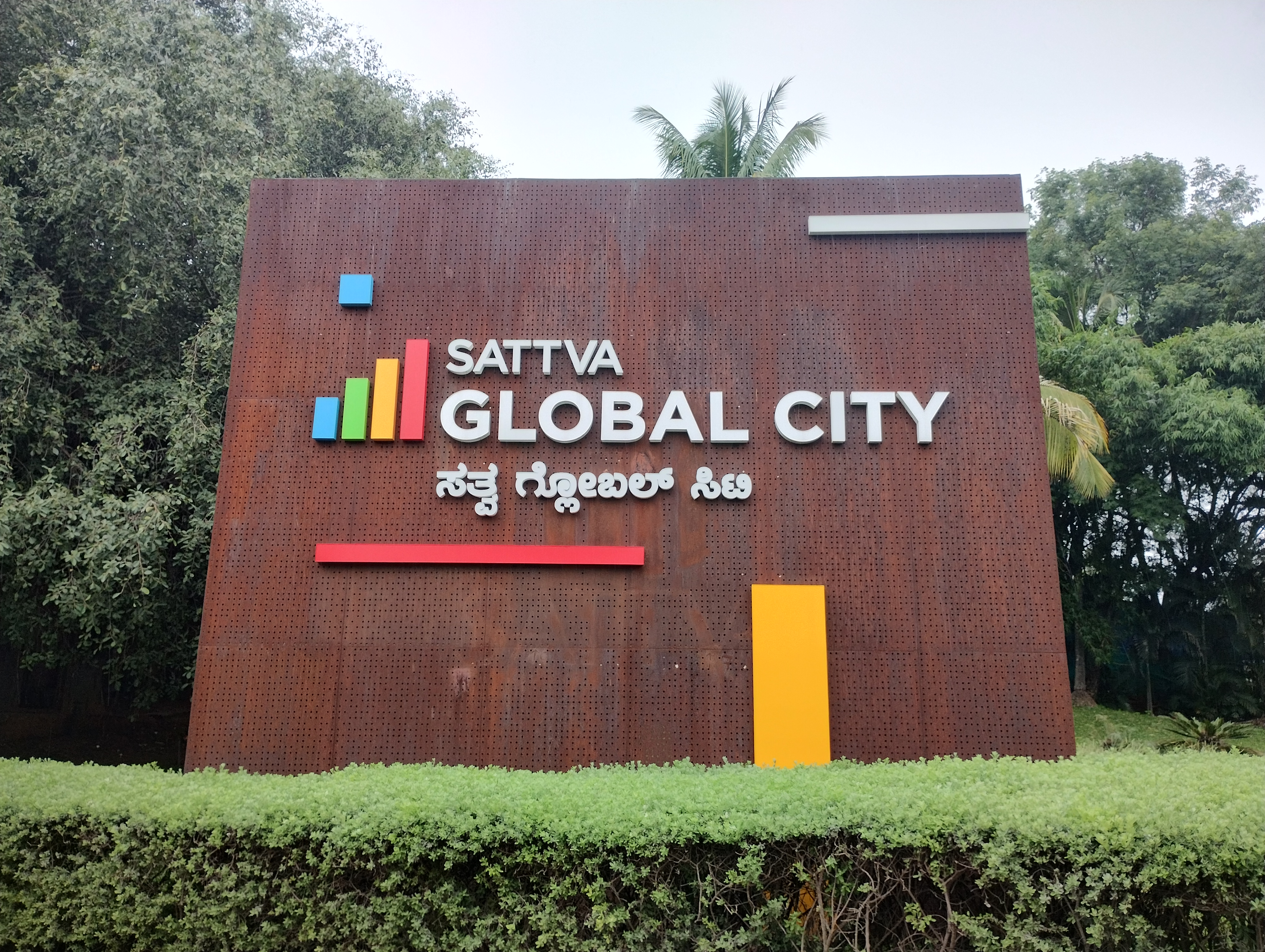
- Sattva Global City in 2024
- Founded: V. G. Siddhartha / Cafe Coffee Day Group
- Location: Kengeri, Mysore Road, Bangalore
- Owners: Blackstone (80%); Salarpuria Sattva (20%)
- Industry: Information technology, IoT, Electronics, Mechanical engineering
- Major companies: LTIMindtree, Mphasis, NTT Data, Tietoevry, Northern Trust, Textron, Sonata Software, Texas Instruments, Capgemini

Sattva Global City (formerly Global Village Tech Park) is a software technology park in Bangalore, India. The park is in Kengeri off Mysore Road, behind the R.V. College of Engineering. It is about 4 km away from Kengeri railway station and 1 km away from Pattanagere metro station. The park is spread over 120 acres with a total built-up area of 3.3 million sq ft. The headquarters of erstwhile Mindtree is within the park.

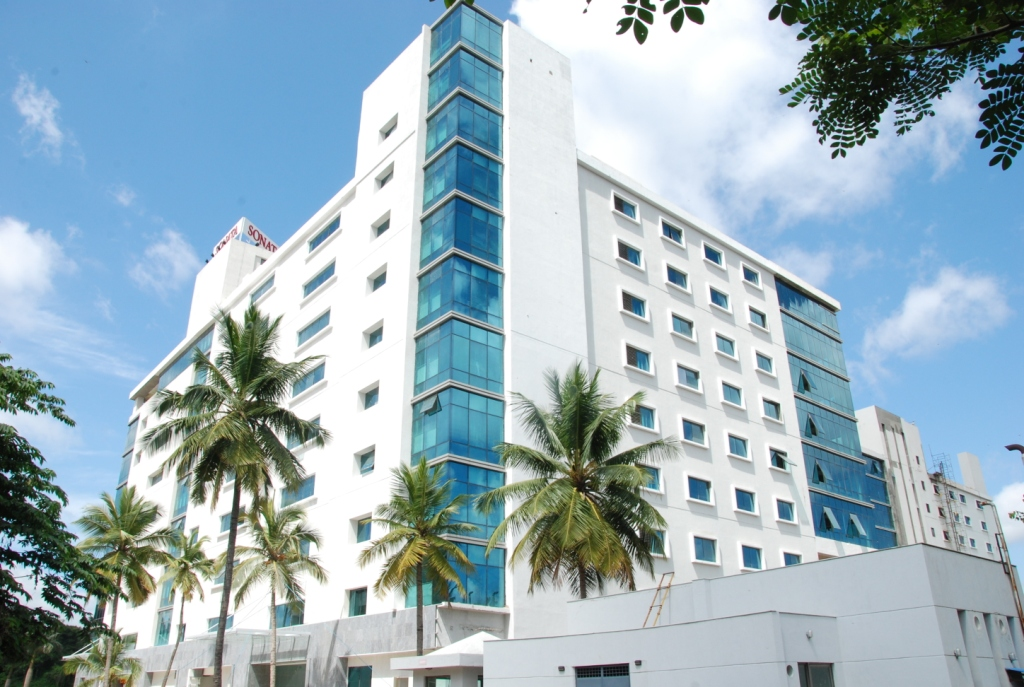
Sonata Software building

Global Village Tech Park was constructed and owned until 2019 by Café Coffee Day Group under its real estate arm Tanglin Developments Ltd. The tech park's value was estimated at ₹3,000 crore in 2019. In September 2019, Cafe Coffee Day Group sold the tech park for ₹2,700 crore (US$383.41 million) to a consortium owned by the Blackstone Group (80%) and Salarpuria Sattva (20%). Global Village Tech Park was consequently renamed Sattva Global City.
