= S. M. Krishna =

Indian politician (1932–2024)

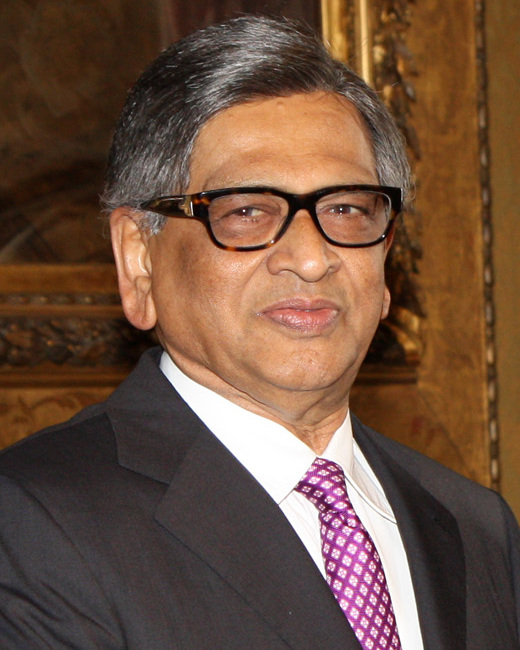
- Krishna in 2011

27th Minister of External Affairs
- In office 23 May 2009 – 28 October 2012
- Prime Minister: Manmohan Singh
- Preceded by: Pranab Mukherjee
- Succeeded by: Salman Khurshid

18th Governor of Maharashtra
- In office 12 December 2004 – 5 March 2008
- Chief Minister: Vilasrao Deshmukh
- Preceded by: Mohammed Fazal
- Succeeded by: S. C. Jamir

10th Chief Minister of Karnataka
- In office 11 October 1999 – 28 May 2004
- Preceded by: J. H. Patel
- Succeeded by: N. Dharam Singh

1st Deputy Chief Minister of Karnataka
- In office 21 January 1993 – 11 December 1994
- Chief Minister: M. Veerappa Moily
- Preceded by: Office Established
- Succeeded by: J. H. Patel
- Constituency: Maddur

7th Speaker of the Karnataka Legislative Assembly
- In office 18 December 1989 – 20 January 1993
- Preceded by: B. G. Banakar, JP
- Succeeded by: V. S. Koujalagi, INC

Personal details
- Born: 1 May 1932 Somanahalli, Kingdom of Mysore, British India
- Died: 10 December 2024 (aged 92) Bengaluru, Karnataka, India
- Party: Bharatiya Janata Party (March 2017–2023)
- Other political affiliations: Indian National Congress (1971 – January 2017); Praja Socialist Party (1962–1971)
- Spouse: Prema (m. 1966)
- Relatives: V. G. Siddhartha (son-in-law)
- Education: Mysore University; Southern Methodist University; George Washington University
- Honours: Padma Vibhushan (2023)

Somanahalli Mallaiah Krishna (1 May 1932 – 10 December 2024) was an Indian politician who served as Minister of External Affairs of India from 2009 to October 2012. He was the 10th Chief Minister of Karnataka from 1999 to 2004 and the 19th Governor of Maharashtra from 2004 to 2008. S. M. Krishna served as the Speaker of the Karnataka Vidhana Soudha from December 1989 to January 1993. He was also a Lok Sabha and Rajya Sabha member from 1971 to 2014. He is widely credited with putting Bengaluru on the world map by building the foundation for it to become the IT Hub that it is today during his tenure as Chief Minister. In 2023, Krishna was awarded the Padma Vibhushan, the second highest civilian award of India.

== Early life and education ==
S. M. Krishna was the son of S. C. Mallaiah, born on 1 May 1932 to a Vokkaliga family in a village named Somanahalli in the Maddur Taluk of Mandya district, Karnataka. He finished his High School in Sri Ramakrishna Vidyashala, Mysore. He completed his Bachelor of Arts from Maharaja's College, Mysore. He obtained a law degree from University Law College, which was then known as Government Law College in Bangalore. Krishna studied in the United States, graduating with Master of Laws degree from Southern Methodist University in Dallas, Texas and The George Washington University Law School in Washington D.C, where he was a Fulbright Scholar.

== Political career ==
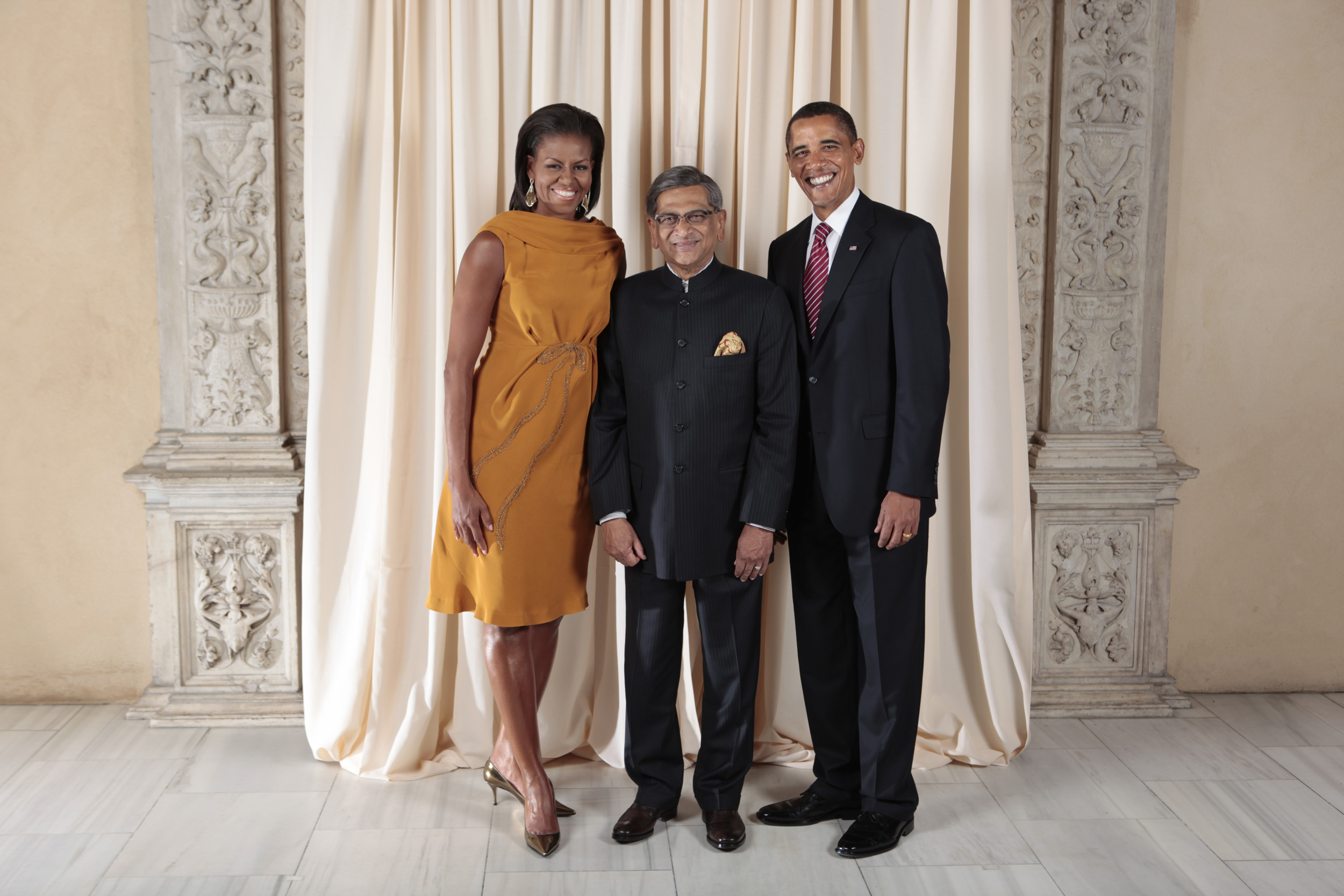
Krishna (centre) with US President Barack Obama and First Lady Michelle Obama during a reception at the Metropolitan Museum in New York

Krishna was politically active as a student in the US. During the 1960 United States presidential election, he campaigned for John F. Kennedy in areas dominated by Indian Americans. After being elected President, Kennedy wrote to Krishna, in 1961, conveying his "warm appreciation of your efforts during the campaign." Upon returning to India, Krishna worked as a professor of international law at Renukacharya Law College, Bangalore.

Krishna began his electoral political career in 1962 when he was elected to the Mysore Legislative Assembly from Maddur. Krishna ran as an independent, defeating K. V. Shankar Gowda, the prominent politician from the Indian National Congress (INC) for whom Prime Minister Jawaharlal Nehru had campaigned.

Krishna then joined the Praja Socialist Party (PSP) but lost to M. Manchegowda of the INC in the 1967 election. However, he was elected to the Lok Sabha in 1968 at the by-polls from Mandya, following the death of the sitting parliamentarian.

In 1968, Krishna was influential in reconciling members of the Indian National Congress and the PSP. He served three terms as an member of parliament from Mandya, starting from the 1968 by-poll as a PSP candidate. His following terms were as a Congressman, winning elections in 1971 and 1980. Mandya remained a Congress stronghold, represented in Lok Sabha later by his political proteges such as Ambareesh and Divya Spandana (also known as Ramya). Krishna resigned from the Lok Sabha in 1972, and became a member of the Karnataka Legislative Council and was appointed a minister by Devaraj Urs.

After he went back to Lok Sabha in 1980, Krishna served as a minister under Indira Gandhi between 1983–84. He lost his run for the Mandya Lok Sabha seat in the 1984 elections. He was reelected to the Karnataka legislative assembly in 1985. He served as Speaker of the Karnataka Legislative Assembly between 18 December 1989 and 20 January 1993. He served as Deputy Chief Minister of Karnataka from 1993 to 1994. Later, he became a member of the Rajya Sabha between April 1996 and 1999.

In 1999, as Karnataka Pradesh Congress Committee president, he led his party to victory in the 1999 assembly polls and took over as Chief Minister of Karnataka, a post he held until being defeated in 2004 Karnataka Legislative Assembly elections. He was also instrumental in creating power reforms with the ESCOMS and digitization of land records (BHOOMI) and many other citizen-friendly initiatives. He encouraged private-public participation and was a sponsor of the Bangalore Advance Task Force.

Krishna was appointed Governor of Maharashtra on 6 December 2004. Krishna resigned as Governor of Maharashtra on 5 March 2008. It was reported that this was due to his intention to return to active politics in Karnataka. President Pratibha Patil accepted his resignation on 6 March. Krishna entered the Rajya Sabha and subsequently took the oath of office as Union Cabinet Minister of External Affairs in the Council of Ministers under Prime Minister Manmohan Singh on 22 May 2009. In his tenure as the external affairs minister, he visited a number of countries including Tajikistan in 2012 to strengthen economic and energy ties. Krishna resigned as External Affairs Minister on 26 October 2012 indicating a return to Karnataka state politics.

Krishna resigned as a member of INC on 29 January 2017, stating that the party was in a "state of confusion" on whether it needed mass leaders or not. He also complained of having been sidelined by the party and that the party was "dependent on managers and not time-tested people like himself". After speculation concerning his joining the Bharatiya Janata Party, he formally joined the party in March 2017. He announced his retirement from politics in January 2023, citing age-related issues.

== Positions held ==
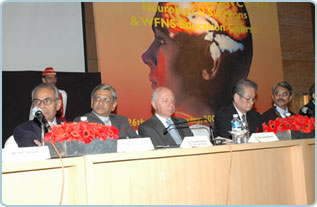
Krishna (second from left) at the 6th Asian Congress of Neurological Surgeons, organised by the Hinduja Hospital, 2006

Duration	Position held	Refs.
1962–67	Elected to 3rd Mysore Legislative Assembly from Maddur.	
1968–1970	Elected to 4th Lok Sabha as Socialist MP from Mandya after a by-poll when sitting MP died in 1967	
1971–1972	Elected to 5th Lok Sabha, Congress candidate from Mandya	
1972–1977	Member of Karnataka Legislative Council	
1972–77	Minister for Commerce & Industries & Parliamentary Affairs, Government of Karnataka	
1980–1984	Elected to 7th Lok Sabha from Mandya	
29 January 1983 – 7 February 1984	Union Minister of State for Industry	
7 February 1984 – 7 September 1984	Union Minister of State for Finance	
7 September 1984 – 31 October 1984 and 4 November 1984 – 31 December 1984	Union Minister of State for Commerce	
1989–1994	Member, 9th Karnataka Legislative Assembly	
18 December 1989 – 20 January 1993	Speaker, Karnataka Legislative Assembly	
1992 – 9 December 1994	Deputy Chief Minister of Karnataka	
April 1996 – 1999	Member of Rajya Sabha	
1999–2000	President of Karnataka Pradesh Congress Committee	
October 1999 – 2004	Chief Minister of Karnataka (MLA from Maddur)	
2004	Re-elected to Karnataka Legislative Assembly from Chamrajpet constituency	
2004–2008	Governor of Maharashtra	
2008–2014	Member of Rajya Sabha from Karnataka	
22 May 2009 – 26 October 2012	External Affairs Minister, Government of India	

== Personal life ==
Krishna was married to Prema. They had two daughters. His daughter Malavika Krishna was married to the Late V. G. Siddhartha, a businessman and the founder of Cafe Coffee Day. He had a younger brother, Shankar (died 2019), who was a member of the Karnataka Legislative Council.

At the dusk of his political life, he released his biography, Smritivahini, in the presence of many dignitaries. He penned many interesting incidents, including Veerappan Kidnapping of Rajkumar during his tenure as the chief minister. He also quoted that the former prime minister of India and national president of Janata Dal (Secular) H. D. Devegowda had strong plans of joining Indian National Congress twice during the period of National emergency.

Krishna died from a long illness at his residence in Bengaluru, on 10 December 2024, at the age of 92. He was cremated with state honours complete with gun salute at his ancestral village of Somanahalli in Maddur taluk of Mandya district on 11 December. The Karnataka Government announced a three day mourning period.

Lok Sabha
Preceded by M. K. Shivananjappa	Member of Parliament for Mandya; 1968–1972	Succeeded by K Chikklingaiah
Preceded by K Chikklingaiah	Member of Parliament for Mandya; 1980–1984	Succeeded by K.V. Shankaragowda
Political offices
Preceded by none	Deputy Chief Minister of Karnataka; 1993–1994	Succeeded by J. H. Patel
Preceded by Jayadevappa Halappa Patel	Chief Minister of Karnataka; 1999–2004	Succeeded by Dharam Singh
Preceded by Mohammed Fazal	Governor of Maharashtra; 2004–2008	Succeeded by Sanayangba Chubatoshi Jamir
Preceded by Pranab Mukherjee	Minister of External Affairs; 2009–2012	Succeeded by Salman Khurshid
