= Sri Ramakrishna Vidyashala =

subramanya.c.shetty
- subramanya.c.shtty
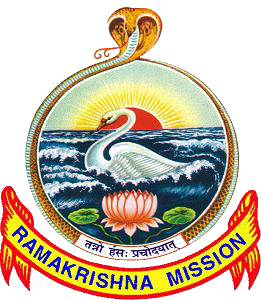

Location
- Karnataka; India; 12.327003°N 76.636833°E

Information
- Motto: Atmano mokshartham jagat hitaya cha (आत्मनो मोक्षार्थं जगद्धिताय च) (For one’s own salvation and for the welfare of the world)
- Religious affiliation: Hindu
- Denomination: Ramakrishna Mission
- Superintendent: Swami Yukteshanandaji Maharaj
- Principal: T.K. Chandrasekhar
- Campus size: 69 Acres
- Website: srkvs.org

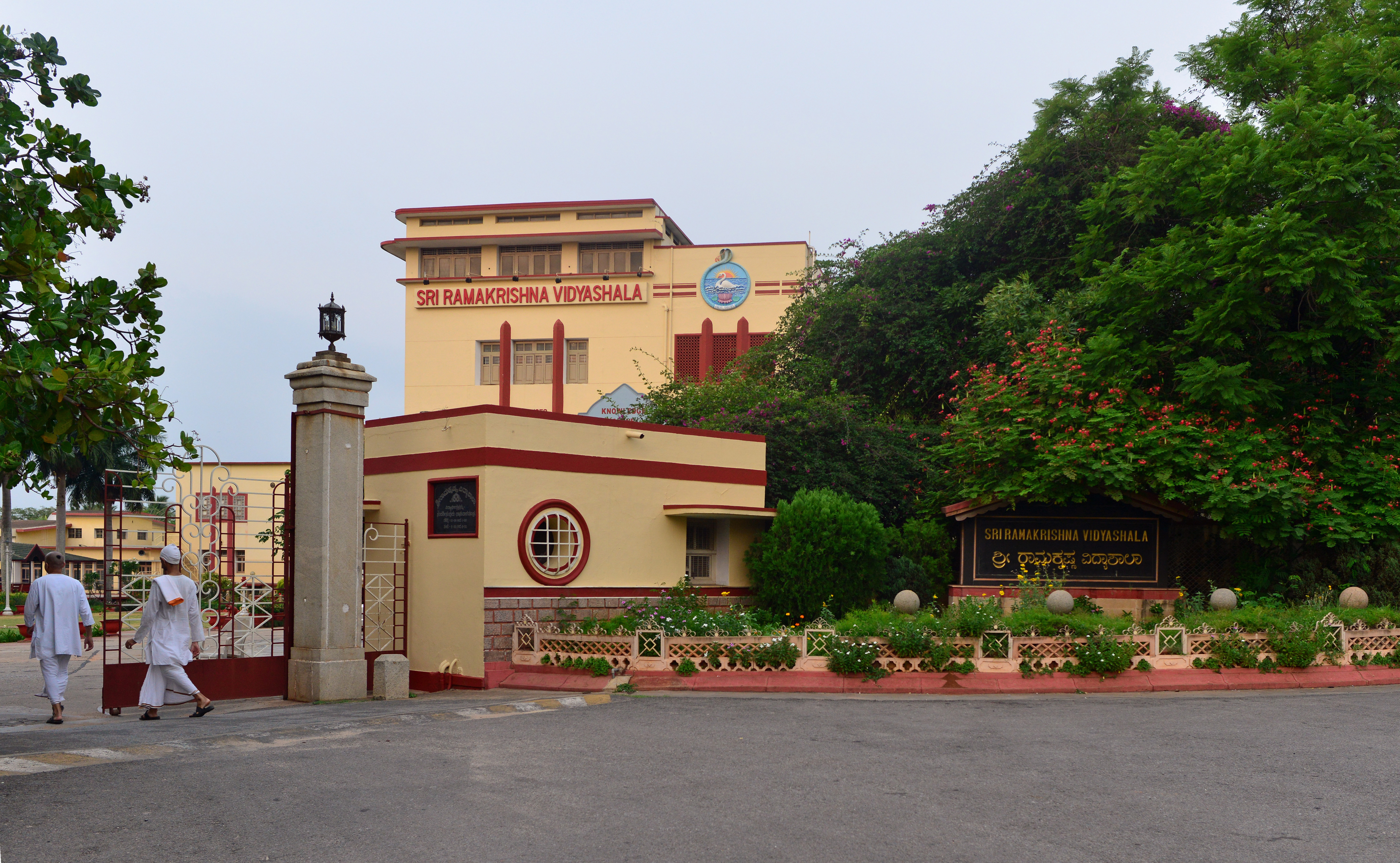
Sri Ramakrishna Vidyashala school, Mysore

Sri Ramakrishna Vidyashala is a residential school for boys run by the Ramakrishna Mission. It is situated in the southern Indian city of Mysore in Karnataka. It offers a comprehensive education from high school to junior college, or grades eight through twelve.

Vidyashala is one of nine centers of the Ramakrishna Mission in the state of Karnataka. Two others are located in Mysore: Sri Ramakrishna Ashrama and the Ramakrishna Institute of Moral and Spiritual Education.

== Early history ==
Vidyashala was founded in 1953 by Swami Shambhavananda, a monk of the Ramakrishna Math who was born in Kodagu. The swami was one of the early presidents of Sri Ramakrishna Ashrama, Mysore. He was an educational pioneer in southern Karnataka who sought to offer younger students a "man-making education", which Swami Vivekananda had described as a "total development of man which includes the physical, mental and spiritual."

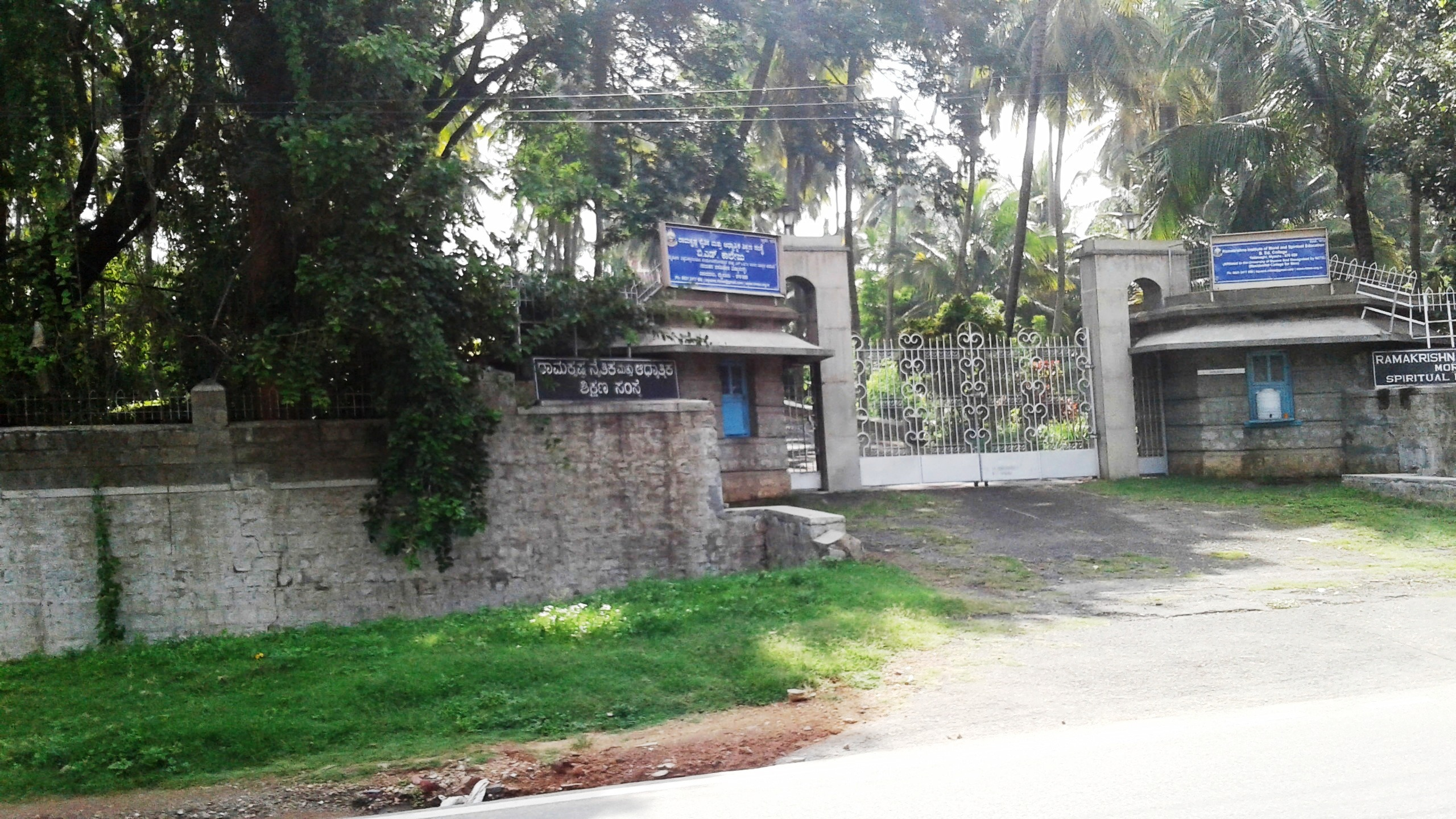
Ramakrishna Institute, Mysore

Before it moved to its current location, Vidyashala began as a small hostel for students of various age groups called Ramakrishna Students Home. The students home was built in 1932; some of its residents, such as the critically acclaimed writers K.V. Puttappa, Javare Gowda and S.M. Krishna, the former Minister of External Affairs (India), went on to become prominent members of society. When Swami Shambhavananda felt a need to expand the student's home, he procured a redesign from Sri B.B. Mhatre, the renowned architect of Bombay. Swami Shambhavananda faced the daunting challenge of collecting funds to build the new hostel. In search of funding, he toured various parts of Karnataka, but he also went to Bombay, where he met with several prospective contributors. Help also came from the Union government and the governments of Coorg and Mysore. One of the many legends of the swami's fund-collection drive is that he walked around Mysore's Yadavagiri area seeking bhiksha on behalf of the new hostel. After gathering the funds and then acquiring land from the Maharaja of Mysore, Swami Shambhavananda physically led the building construction even in an advanced age. The new hostel was inaugurated 2 October 1950 by Chakravarthi Rajagopalachari, the first and only Indian Governor-general of India. His highness Jayachamarajendra Wadiyar, the then Maharaja of Mysore, presided over the inaugural function.

After the new hostel was inaugurated, Swami Shambhavananda, in order to address the students, who had to travel to other schools for their education, conceived a plan to convert the hostel into a residential school. After making some modifications to the building, the new school was inaugurated in 1953. In 1957, the 33.3-meter open-air swimming pool, one of the earliest modern swimming pools in Mysore, was inaugurated by India's first Prime Minister, Pt. Jawaharlal Nehru.

== Leadership ==
Vidyashala is administered by a Ramakrishna Math monk, or Swami, designated as "Correspondent". Swami Yukteshananda, an Engineering graduate in Electronics, is the current Correspondent. He had served at the Ramakrishna Mission Ashrama, Belgaum and Sri Ramakrishna-Sharada Ashrama, Ponnampet, Kodagu, before taking up this responsibility. Swami Muktidananda, who was one of the earlier Correspondents, is now the Adhyaksha of Ramakrishna Ashrama, Mysuru and is one of the Trustees of Ramakrishna math & Ramakrishna Mission. Swami Satyeshananda, an old student of the institution and a trained doctor, who'd previously served the Ramakrishna Mission Hospital in Chandigarh, briefly served as the Correspondent after Swami Muktidananda. Vidyashala's academic sections are in the charge of the Principal, T.K. Chandrasekhar, who has previously taught Mathematics to the students. S. Balaji, a former Chemistry lecturer (now retired), had previously served as the Principal for 25 years before handing over the charge to T.K. Chandrasekhar.

The former administrator, Swami Muktidananda took charge as correspondent in 1997. A trained botanist, Muktidananda established in 1998 "Nisarga Niketana," a thatched classroom resembling a traditional gurukula. He initiated a restoration of Vidyashala's aging main building, re-tiled the swimming pool, made several aesthetic additions to the campus, commissioned a new audiovisual theater, and led enhancements for Vidyashala's golden jubilee in 2003. In 2007, Muktidananda's compilations of Swami Achalananda's expositions on puja were published by the Mysore Ashrama as the 213-page book The Meaning and Significance of Worship. He was instrumental in conceptualising, designing and constructing a "Knowledge Park" at Vidyashala, aimed at developing scientific temper amongst students. He also spearheaded the putting up of a mural on the frontage of Vidyashala, depicting different faces of India, be it Cultural, Social, Religious or Scientific.

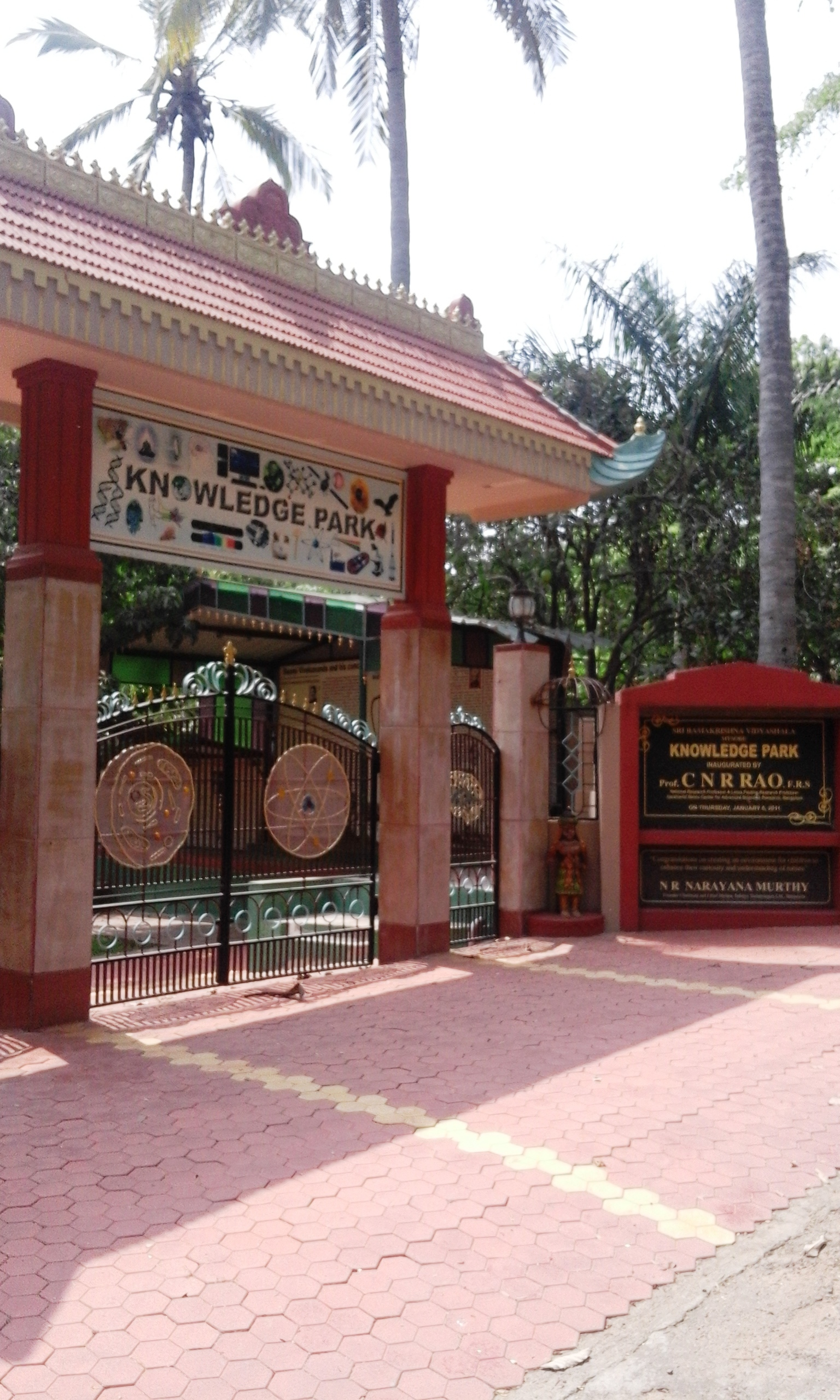
Gates of Knowledge Park, Ramakrishna Vidyashala, Yadavagiri, Mysore

Much of Vidyashala's reputation is attributed to the leadership of Swami Sureshananda ("Hari Maharaj"), correspondent for nearly two decades until 1990 when he succeeded Swami Somanathananda as president of Sri Ramakrishna Ashrama, Mysore. In that position, Sureshananda built a public auditorium, renovated the Ashrama building, and construct two floors of quarters for monks. In the late 1990s, Sureshananda moved into spiritual practice in Biligiriranga Hills.

Sureshananda helped Vidyashala's campus optimize productivity, increase its biodiversity and move toward self-sustainability. He planted and tended to coconut, arabica coffee, sapota, silver oak and elephant grass (Saccharum ravennae). Sureshananda never traveled out of Mysore without bringing back flora for Vidyashala. Sureshananda established a biogas facility attached to the dairy, an electric laundry, and biological, physical and chemical student-laboratories. Sureshananda took a special interest in Vidyashala's band troop. He was involved in Vidyashala's management even while his successor, the popular Swami Paratmananda ("Gangadhar Maharaj"), served as correspondent from 1990 until 1997.

On 15 April 2008, a 79-year-old Sureshananda had surgery for lower back pain at Lilavati Hospital, Mumbai. In early December 2009, Sureshananda was treated for a fracture in the upper right femur, at Basappa Memorial Hospital in Mysuru. The much-loved Swami Sureshananda died on 8 March 2019, on the sacred day of Ramakrishna Jayanti.

== Examination performance ==
In 2016, Vidyashala boy Ravish S B became the state topper in the Science Stream in the PUC Examination, after revaluation.

In 2010, of the 56 students that appeared for the pre-university course (PUC) examination, "31 scored distinctions, 24 first class and one student passed in second class. Swami Muktidananda, the then Correspondent of Vidyashala, said the aggregate average marks of the entire class was 83.50 per cent ... Aditya R. Shenoy topped the merit list, scoring 572 out of 600 marks. In addition, 10 students scored 100 marks in different subjects." Of the 98 students that appeared in the Secondary School Leaving Certificate (SSLC) examination, "62 passed with distinction and the rest with first class. K.C. " In the previous year 2009, of the 96 students that had appeared for the Secondary School Leaving Certificate (SSLC) examination, 63 secured distinction and 32 passed in first class.

== Biodiversity, playgrounds, pool ==
The verdant 69-acre (280,000 m^{2}) campus is flanked on the west by a T-shaped four-storey building whose terrace offers a panoramic view. The 33.3-meter open-air swimming pool, one of Mysore's oldest and finest, was inaugurated in 1957 by India's first Prime Minister, Pt. Jawaharlal Nehru.

There are 22 playgrounds for sports such as football, hockey, basketball, volleyball, throwball, kho-kho, and a cricket pitch, the cricket pitch having been inaugurated by Anil Kumble on the occasion of the inauguration of the 56th Annual Athletic Meet at the Vidyashala. A couple of small cottages, called kutiras, by a scenic pond in the campus, are used for meditation by visiting Ramakrishna Math monks. There is an automated laundry and a mechanized dairy housing 50 cows.

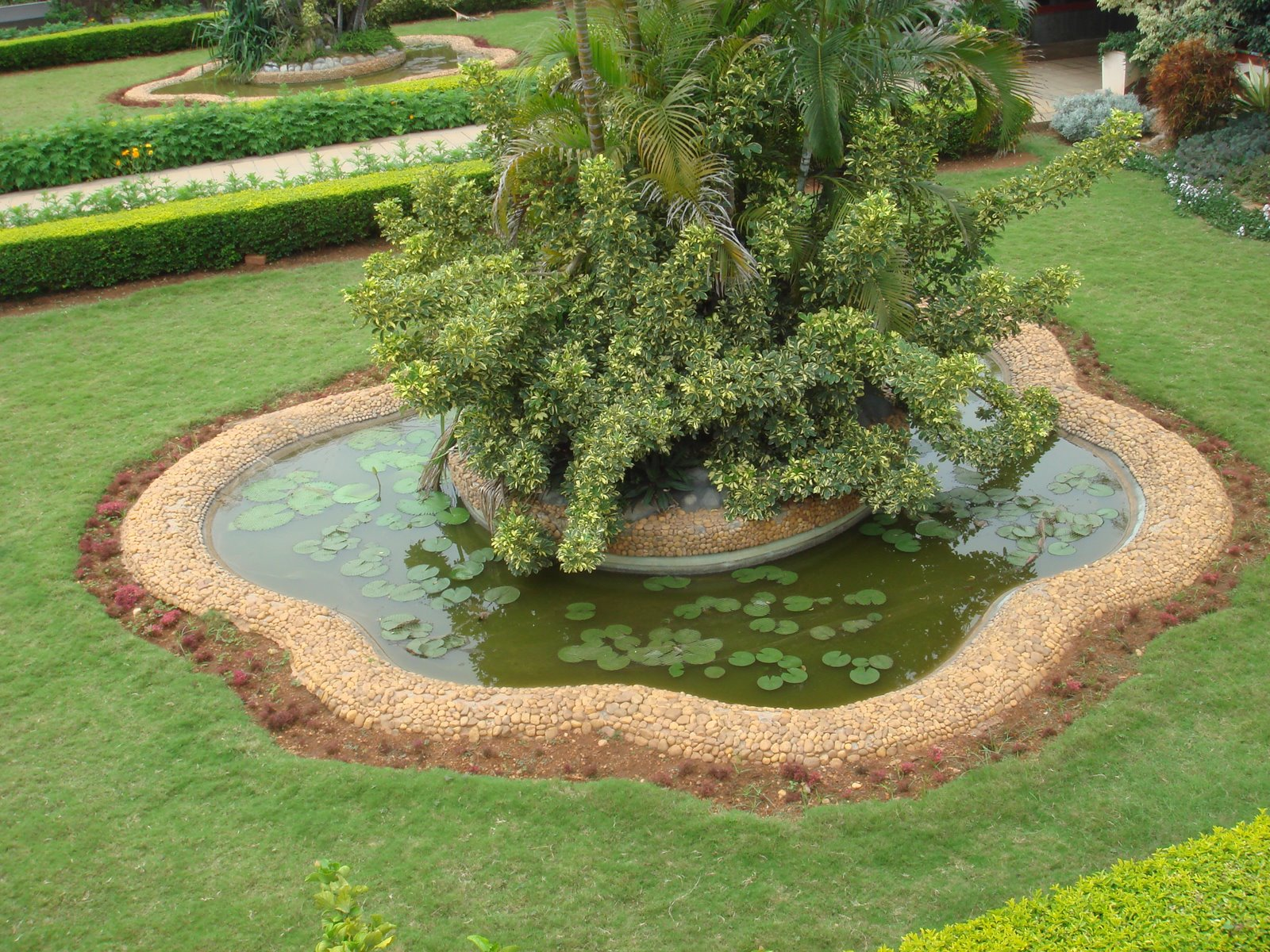
Garden of RIMSE

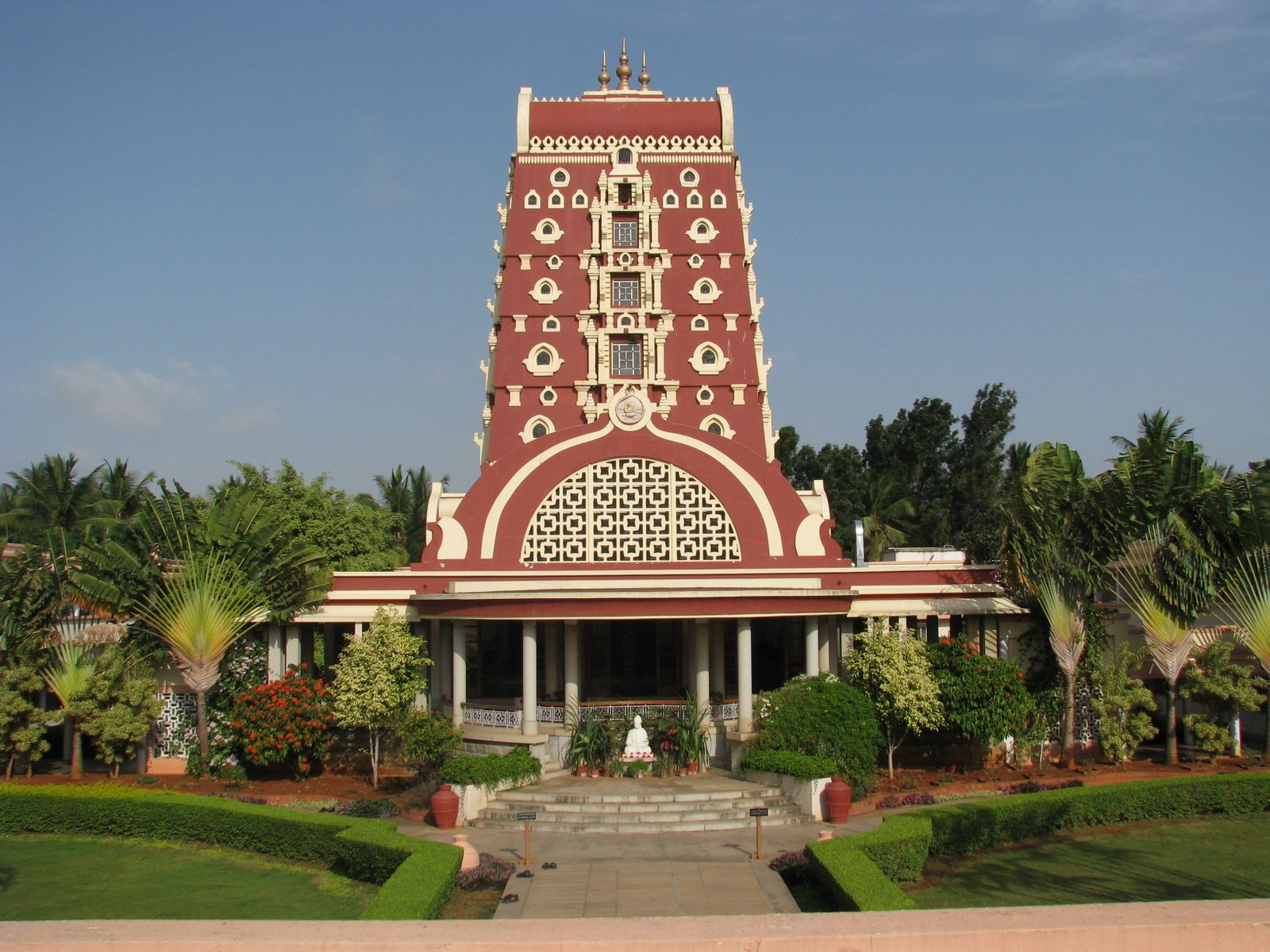
Gopuram at RIMSE

The campus hosts about a thousand species of flora including rarities such as a North American Giant Redwood and a Thai tree that blossoms every twelfth year, as well as plantations of sapota, arabica coffee, elephant grass (Saccharum ravennae), coconut, and silver oak. The campus is a sanctuary for nearly four hundred species of birds, including migrants such as the cormorant. An index of the campus fauna is available on signs to the left at the gates.

On the southeastern corner of Vidyashala's campus is located the Ramakrishna Institute of Moral and Spiritual Education, popularly called "Vedanta College," which offers a Bachelor of Education program and whose prayer hall is topped by a distinctive Pallava-style gopuram visible from about five kilometers around.

Vidyashala hosts an award-winning company of the Thirteen Karnataka Battalion of the National Cadet Corps (Army wing).

== Swami Vivekananda's statue ==
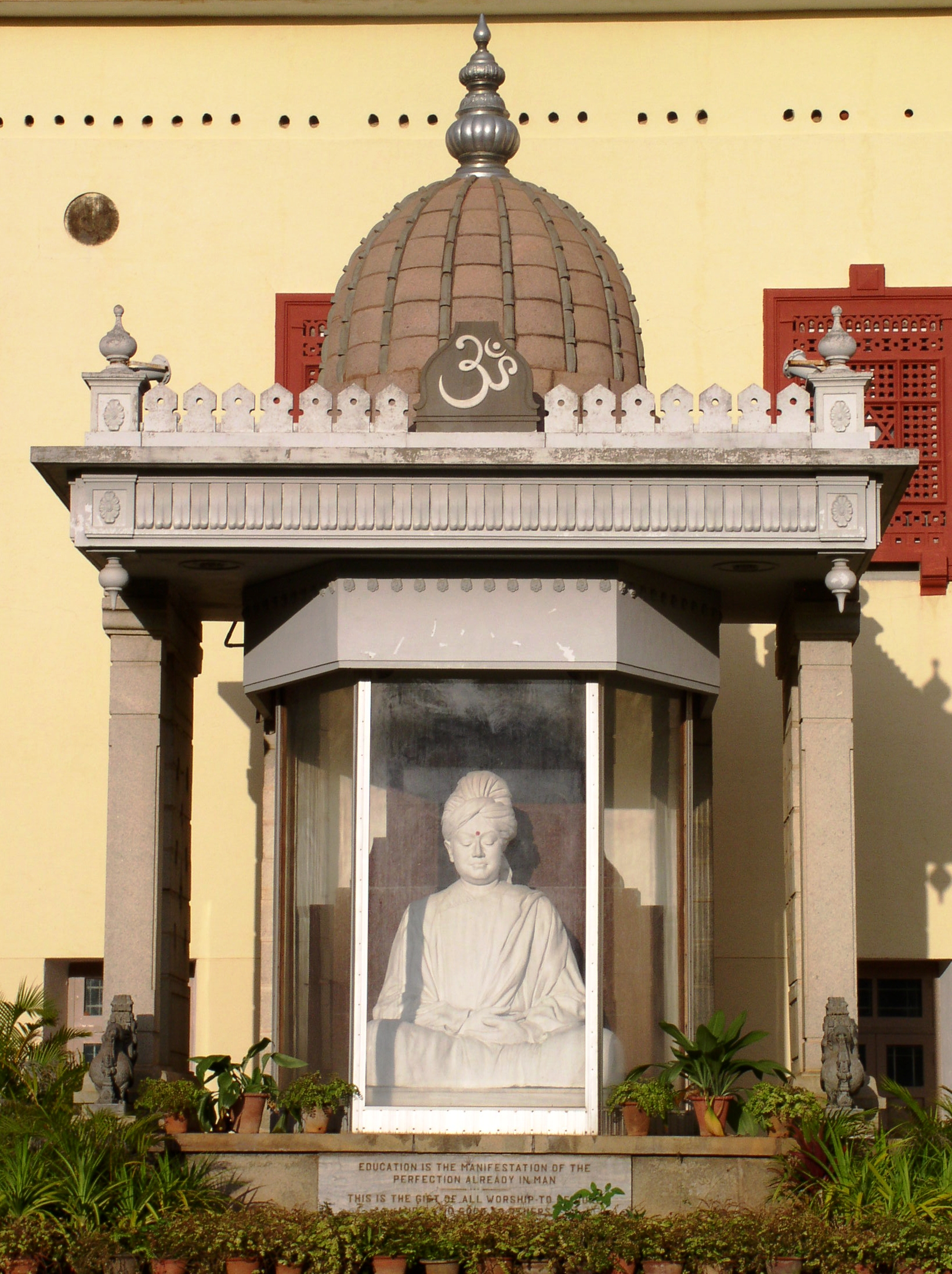
Caen stone statue of Swami Vivekananda in meditation pose

A statue of Swami Vivekananda in a meditation pose, at the entrance of Vidyashala, is sculpted by an artist from Burma, U. Han Tin. It is made of Caen stone from England. The statue was earlier located at the Ramakrishna Mission Hospital in Rangoon (Yangon) in Burma (Myanmar). During the 1962 military coup in Burma, the large hospital run by the Mission was taken over by the military junta; the junta allowed the Mission to relocate the statue.

In 1965, the statue was transported from Burma to Mysore. It was unveiled at its current location in 1978 by Lal Krishna Advani, the then Indian Union minister of information and broadcasting, during Vidyashala's silver jubilee celebration.

The statue is housed in a granite mandapa designed in the style of the Bhagavad Gita chariot by Vidyashala's architect, E. Ashirvadam. It combines Bengali and Dravidian styles of architecture. Swami Vivekananda's aphorism, "Education is the manifestation of perfection already in man," is inscribed on a plaque at the statue's base.

== Dormitories, laboratories, observatory ==
The students live in dormitory-style facilities, each supervised by a warden, often a resident monk.

The students have access to a library with nearly 15000 volumes, a 400-seat auditorium with motion picture projectors, a separate digital audiovisual theater, a computer laboratory.

Vidyashala's astronomical observatory is accessible to students of other Mysore schools. The observatory houses two reflecting telescopes, including a 14-inch (360 mm) Celestron Schmidt-Cassegrain.

There is a biological and fine arts section, a sports stadium used as parade ground, an open-air theater, teachers' quarters, an electric bakery, ophthalmic and dental clinics, a dispensary (offering homeopathic or modern medical treatments), a two-floor gymnasium with weights and a wooden badminton court, and several table tennis courts.

In 2003 a Golden Jubilee block, comprising classrooms, dormitories, a prayer hall, and a small amphitheater, was constructed about 200 yards (180 m) south of the main building. The golden jubilee year also saw infrastructure improvements, including a pagoda-style waiting area for parents, an entry facade, and a digital audiovisual theater.

== Student activities ==
Vidyashala's students number about 400 and fall in the age group of 13–18 years. Many of those who hail from outside Karnataka are from Andhra Pradesh, Tamil Nadu, West Bengal, Bihar and Maharashtra. For several years, Vidyashala recruited students from India's northeastern states, particularly from Manipur.

The students follow a demanding regimen from the rising hour of 5.05 a.m. until they go to bed at about 10.15 p.m. A typical day is packed with physical exercise, literary activities, hobby pursuits including art and music, participation in a chosen outdoor sport, Vedic (often Upanishadic) chants and meditation, in addition to classroom work. The medium of instruction is English, with syllabi adopted from the state boards of secondary and pre-university education.

Two days a week the students go swimming, many times a year they perform manual or social work, and two or three times a year they participate in educational excursions to towns of historical or scientific interest. They return home for about four weeks during Dasara and for about eight weeks during the summer. Monthly once(high school)/twice(PUC) a guardian may visit Vidyashala on a Sunday to take their ward for on an outing. PUC students are allowed to go for outing on their own.

The students eat four times a day. Meals are lacto-vegetarian, prepared by resident cooks, and had while sitting cross-legged (yoga style) in a dining area. Lunch and dinner are preceded by chanting selected verses from the Bhagavad Gita. Many Indian festivals, including Krishna Janmashtami, Ganesh Chaturthi, Upanayanam or Munji, Shivarathri and Christmas, are celebrated with special activities. Every Ekadashi is celebrated with a special long prayer session. The students participate in voluntary activities coordinated by an elected Student's Council comprising a president, a general secretary, a vice president and a joint secretary, in addition to about 20 other secretaries. Students Council officers are typically elected in July via electronic voting.

Vidyashala's students have achieved consistently excellent examination results over two decades. Class averages hover around 85 per cent. The school performed well even in 2004 and 2005 when Mysore district otherwise recorded a relatively poor performance.

== Annual celebration ==
Vidyashala's annual day, typically celebrated in mid-December, is a showcase of its students' talents, physical, artistic and intellectual. A two-day event, it attracts parents and others from around Mysore district and outside. Vidyashala's twelve-instrument English band, whose members play English and Indian tunes, is usually a highlight, as is a torchlight parade.

The annual day includes a gymnastics show as well as a stage-drama on a classical theme, and is also an occasion when the Old Boys Association conducts an alumni meeting followed by a five-course lunch whose highlight is typically the "Prabhakar rasam" (named after a popular cook) and the "fruit salad" (said to be prepared from campus-grown fruits), all served on leaf plates called patrawallis woven from dry areca leaves.

Every third annual day, Vidyashala announces a recipient of the Dr. R.K. Narayanan and P. Kousalya Narayanan Memorial Gold Medal for Outstanding Character, instituted by K. Sarojini of Chennai. On 6 January 2011, the medal was awarded to Anirudh Mukund Deshpande of the 2003-06 batch and currently a medical student. Earlier, in January 2008, that medal was presented to G. Suhas of the 2000-05 batch, an academic topper and Sahara India scholar. Suhas, a student of Bangalore Medical College and Research Institute, was handed the medal by chief guest Dr. B. Soma Raju, chairman of CARE Hospitals, Hyderabad.

== Praise ==
Educational institutions run by the Ramakrishna Mission tend toward being non-profit. They use the Mission's motto of "Atmano mokshartham jagat hitaya cha" (आत्मनो मोक्षार्थम् जगद्धिताय च in the Devanāgarī script of the original Sanskrit), which translates as, "For self-realization and for the universal good."

Bharat Ratna Dr. A P J Abdul Kalam, who visited Vidyashala on 20 January 2001, stated " am indeed delighted to be in a place like Sri Ramakrishna Vidyashala, which is very close to my heart. It is a place where science and spirituality work together. This type of value system is very important…". N R Narayana Murthy, the founder of Infosys, on the energy and enthusiasm shown by the boys of Vidyashala, exclaimed "Imagine what would be if there were 10,000 such schools in India!". Other eminent visitors to comment on and praise Vidyashala include George Fernandes, the former Defence Minister, who noted that the institution emphasized character and personality, A. Jayagovinda, director of the National Law School of India University, who praised its "value-based education.", Padma Vibhushan K. Kasturirangan and Padma Vibhushan G. Madhavan Nair, both being former Chairmen of ISRO.

== Notable alumni ==
- Kuppalli Venkatappa Puttappa
- D Javare Gowda
- S M Krishna
- Charan Raj (composer)
- Karthik Saragur
- Jai Jagadish

== Image Gallery ==
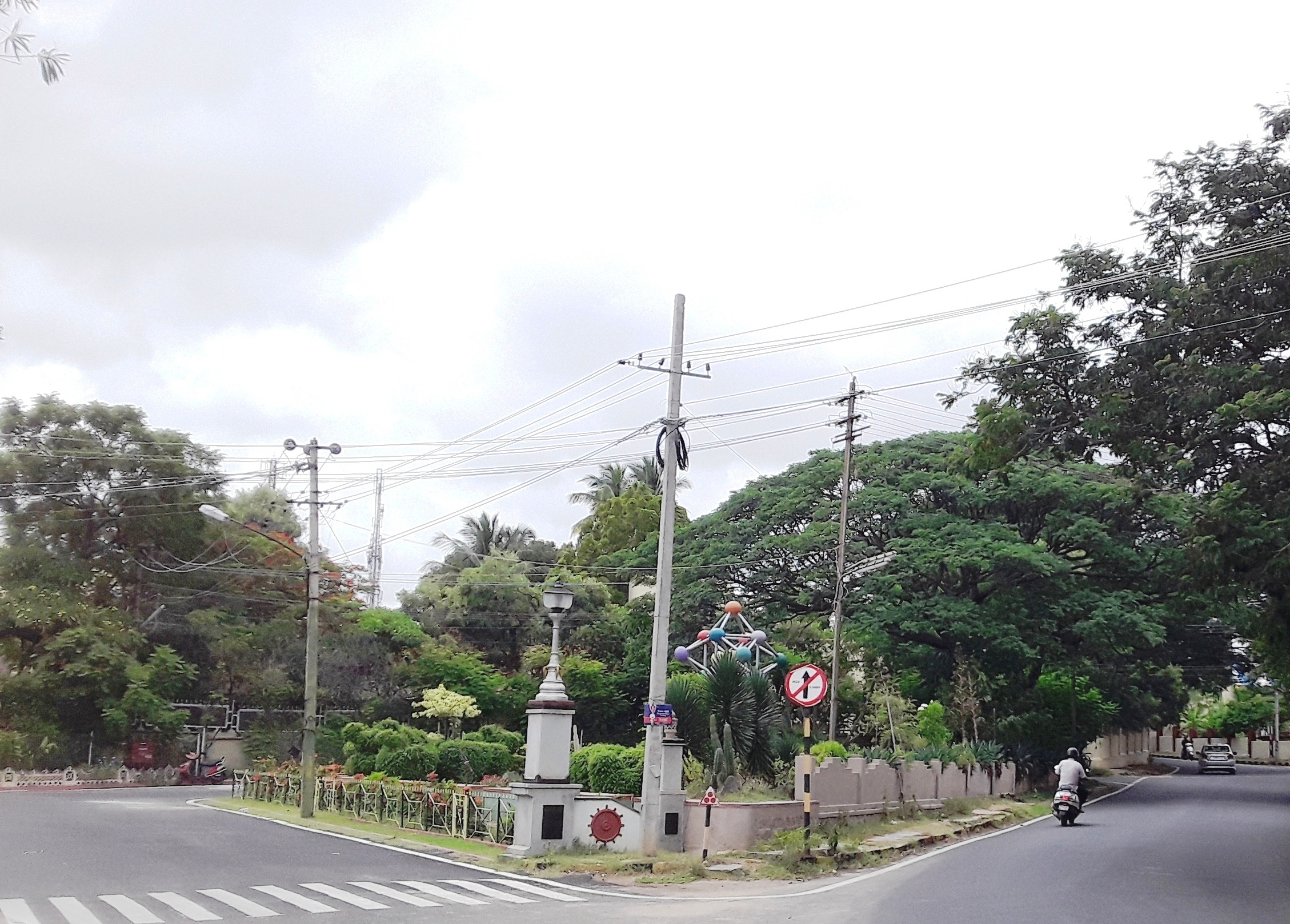
The entrance road

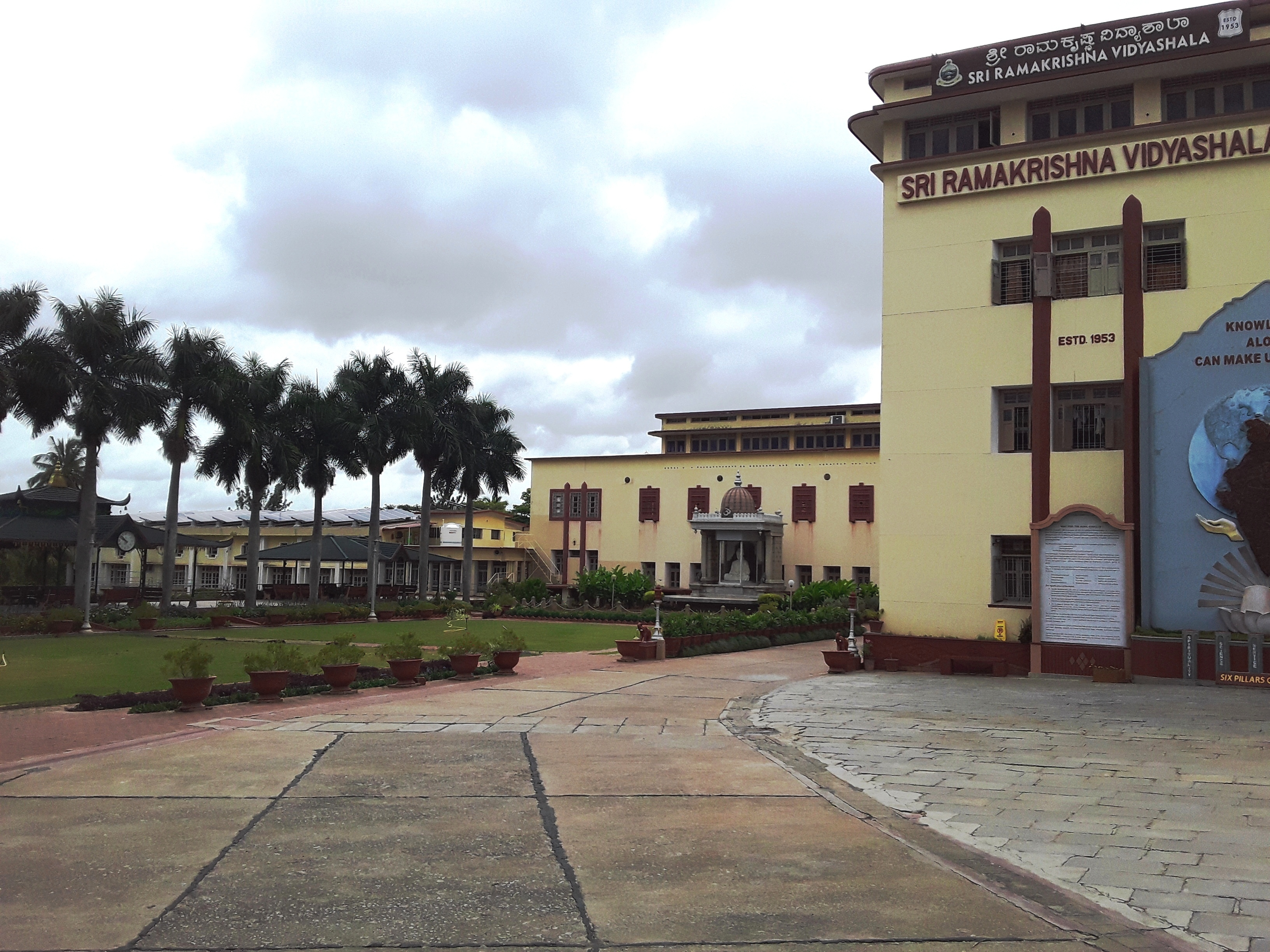
The main building
