= V. G. Siddhartha =

Indian businessman (1959–2019)

- Born: Veerappa Gangaiah Siddhartha Hegde; 1958 or 1959; Thanoodi, Mysore State, India
- Died: 29 July 2019 (aged 60); Mangalore, Karnataka, India
- Resting place: Chikkamagaluru, Karnataka, India
- Education: St. Aloysius College; Mangalore University
- Occupation: Businessman
- Title: Chairman & MD, Café Coffee Day
- Board member of: Mindtree
- Relatives: S. M. Krishna (father in-law)

Veerappa Gangaiah Siddhartha Hegde (1958 or 1959 – 29 July 2019) was an Indian businessman from Karnataka. He was the founder of the cafe chain Café Coffee Day and was its chairman and managing director. He was on the board of directors of Mindtree, GTV, Liqwid Krystal, Way2wealth Brokers, Coffee Day Natural Resources, and Way2wealth Securities.

After going missing on the evening of 29 July 2019, his body was found by three fishermen at the Hoige Bazaar beach, near the mouth of the river Nethravati on 31 July.

== Early life ==
Veerappa Gangaiah Siddhartha Hegde was born to Gangaiah Hegde in the Malenadu region of Chikmagalur district in Karnataka. He hailed from a very affluent family of coffee planters belonging to the Vokkaliga community. He received a master's degree in economics from St. Aloysius College and Mangalore University, Karnataka.

== Career ==
At the age of 24, he joined J M Financial Limited in 1983–1984 in Mumbai as a management trainee/intern in portfolio management and securities trading on the Indian stock market. After two years, he returned to Bangalore. With capital given by his father, Siddhartha bought stocks worth ₹30,000 and started the company Sivan Securities. In 1999, it was renamed Way2wealth Securities Ltd. Its venture capital division came to be known as Global Technology Ventures (GTV).

He established his coffee trading company ABC in Karnataka 1993, with a ₹6 crore turnover. He bought an ailing coffee curing unit in Hassan for ₹4 crore and improved it. The company now has the largest curing capacity in India at 75,000 tonnes.

He was the first entrepreneur in Karnataka to set up a café in 1996 (Café Coffee Day, a chain of "youth hangout" coffee parlors). By 2018, the chain had over 1700 cafés in India. His cafes attract 40,000 to 50,000 visitors a week. Siddhartha also held board seats in GTV, Mindtree, Liqwid Krystal, Way2Wealth, and Ittiam. In 2000, he founded Global Technology Ventures Ltd, a company that identifies, invests in, and mentors Indian companies engaged in technologies. GTV set up Global Village Tech Park on a 59-acre (240,000 m^{2}) plot as an incubator park in Bangalore, providing office space, communication links, recreational facilities, and a commercial centre. In 1999, GTV was valued by BankAm at $100 million.

He planted banana trees on 3,000 acres (1,214 ha) and had plans to export bananas. The Dark Forest Furniture Company is named after V. G. Siddhartha's Kathale Kaad (Dark Forest in Kannada) estate in Chikmagalur.

Sical Logistics Ltd, a logistics company founded in India in 1955, was acquired by Coffee Day group in 2011.

On 21 September 2017, a tax raid was conducted at more than 20 of V. G. Siddhartha's locations in Mumbai, Bengaluru, Chennai, and Chikmagalur by senior officers of the Income Tax Department of Karnataka and Goa regions.

== Personal life ==
Siddhartha was married to Malavika Krishna and had two children Amartya Hegde and Ishaan Hegde. His son Amartya married to D. K. Shivakumar's daughter Aishwarya Shivakumar on 14 February 2021. Siddhartha was the son-in-law of S. M. Krishna, the Chief Minister of Karnataka, Indian Minister for External Affairs and Governor of Maharashtra.

== Death ==
On the evening of 29 July 2019, he told his driver to stop as they approached the bridge over the Nethravati River in Ullal, Mangalore. He directed the driver to wait for him at the other end of the bridge giving an impression that he wanted to take a stroll. The driver reported to the police that he did not show up even after an hour; which led to a search of the area for him. The Indian Coast Guard and National Disaster Response Force eventually joined a search. A letter, apparently written by Siddhartha and addressed to his company board, shareholders, and family, surfaced a few hours after he went missing. This letter detailed the unbearable pressure he was subjected to over the years and the harassment he faced under the "previous" Director General of Income Tax (Investigation) (referred to as DG in the letter).

His body was found at the Hoige Bazaar beach on 31 July around 6:30 am by local fishermen who informed the police. His body was cremated at Chethanahalli coffee estate owned by his family in Chikkamagalur district on 31 July 2019.

A police investigation into his death, reported suicide by drowning as the cause.

== Awards ==
- "Entrepreneur of the Year" for 2002–03 by The Economic Times
- "NextGen Entrepreneur" by Forbes India in 2011

== See also ==
- List of solved missing person cases (post-2000)
