= K. M. Udaya =

Indian politician (born 1975)

Kadalur Udaya Gowda, alias K. M. Udaya (born 1975) is an Indian politician from Karnataka. He is a member of the Karnataka Legislative Assembly from Maddur Assembly constituency in Mandya district. He represents Indian National Congress and won the 2023 Karnataka Legislative Assembly election.

== Early life and education ==
Udaya is born in Kadalur, near Maddur to late Madaiah. He discontinued his studies after passing SSLC in 1991 from S.C.M.M. High School, Somanahalli, Maddur. He is a billionaire businessman and ran businesses in India and abroad, including in Sri Lanka.

== Career ==
Udaya won the Maddur Assembly constituency representing Indian National Congress in the 2023 Karnataka Legislative Assembly election. He polled 87,019 votes and defeated his nearest rival, D. C. Thammanna of Janata Dal (Secular), by a margin of 24,113 votes.

He was alleged to have helped in 'Operation Kamala' where 17 Congress and JDS MLAs resigned to help Yeddyurappa form the government in 2019. Then, he was a member of the Bharatiya Janata Party but later joined Congress. He is a close associate of former minister CP Yogishwar of the BJP.
