= Maddur Assembly constituency =

Legislative Assembly constituency in Karnataka, India

Coordinates: 12.59°N 77.04°E

Maddur
- Constituency No. 187 for the Karnataka Legislative Assembly

Constituency details
- Country: India
- Region: South India
- State: Karnataka
- District: Mandya
- Lok Sabha constituency: Mandya
- Established: 1951
- Total electors: 213,854 (2023)
- Reservation: None

Member of Legislative Assembly
- 16th Karnataka Legislative Assembly
- Incumbent K. M. Udaya
- Party: Indian National Congress
- Elected year: 2023
- Preceded by: D. C. Thammanna

Maddur Assembly constituency is one of the 224 constituencies in the Karnataka Legislative Assembly of Karnataka, a southern state of India. It is also part of Mandya Lok Sabha constituency.

== Members of the Legislative Assembly ==
Election	Member	Party
1952	H. K. Veeranna Gowda	Indian National Congress
1957	H. K. Veeranna Gowda	Indian National Congress
1962	S. M. Krishna	Independent politician
1967	M. Manchegowda	Indian National Congress
1972	A. D. Bili Gowda	Indian National Congress
1978	M. Manchegowda	Janata Party
1983	M. Manchegowda	Indian National Congress
1984^ (Note: Death of M. Manchegowda)	Jayavani M. Manche Gowda	Indian National Congress
1985	B. Appaji Gowda	Janata Party
1989	S. M. Krishna	Indian National Congress
1994	Dr. M. Mahesh Chand	Janata Dal
1999	S. M. Krishna	Indian National Congress
2004	D. C. Thammanna	Indian National Congress
2008	M. S. Siddaraju	Janata Dal
2008^ (Note: Resigned on 03/04/2013)	Kalpana M. S. Siddaraju	Janata Dal
2013	D. C. Thammanna	Janata Dal
2018	D. C. Thammanna	Janata Dal
2023	K. M. Udaya	Indian National Congress

== Election results ==
=== Assembly Election 2023 ===
2023 Karnataka Legislative Assembly election : Maddur
Party	Candidate	Votes	%	±%
INC	K. M. Udaya	87,019	47.45	▲15.37
JD(S)	D. C. Thammanna	62,906	34.30	▼29.18
BJP	S. P. Swamy	28,996	15.81	▲13.39
AAP	Ananda	1,188	0.65	New
NOTA	None of the above	753	0.41	▼0.37
Margin of victory		24,113	13.15	▼18.25
Turnout		183,462	85.79	▲1.99
Total valid votes		183,390		
Registered electors		213,854		▲4.08
INC gain from JD(S)		Swing	▼16.03	

=== Assembly Election 2018 ===
2018 Karnataka Legislative Assembly election : Maddur
Party	Candidate	Votes	%	±%
JD(S)	D. C. Thammanna	109,239	63.48%	▲13.18
INC	Madhu. G. Madegowda	55,209	32.08%	▲1.64
BJP	Madduru Sathisha	4,159	2.42%	▲1.34
NOTA	None of the above	1,350	0.78%	New
Margin of victory		54,030	31.40%	▲11.54
Turnout		172,187	83.80%	▲4.35
Total valid votes		172,095		
Registered electors		205,471		▲4.42
JD(S) hold		Swing	▲13.18	

=== Assembly Election 2013 ===
2013 Karnataka Legislative Assembly election : Maddur
Party	Candidate	Votes	%	±%
JD(S)	D. C. Thammanna	80,926	50.30%	New
INC	Madhu. G. Madegowda	48,968	30.44%	New
Independent	Kalpana Siddaraju	15,797	9.82%	New
Independent	Venkatesha	2,840	1.77%	New
BSP	Boraiah H. H. Swamy	1,843	1.15%	New
BJP	Vanajakshi Ramaraju	1,745	1.08%	New
Independent	Kumara	1,482	0.92%	New
Margin of victory		31,958	19.86%	
Turnout		156,338	79.45%	
Total valid votes		160,892		
Registered electors		196,781		
JD(S) hold		Swing		

=== Assembly By-election 2008 ===
2008 Karnataka Legislative Assembly by-election : Maddur
Party	Candidate	Votes	%	±%
JD(S)	Kalpana M. S. Siddaraju			
JD(S) hold		Swing	▼36.85	

=== Assembly Election 2008 ===
2008 Karnataka Legislative Assembly election : Maddur
Party	Candidate	Votes	%	±%
JD(S)	M. S. Siddaraju	49,954	36.85%	▲25.30
INC	D. C. Thammanna	42,364	31.25%	▼7.30
BJP	Madhu. G. Madegowda	36,967	27.27%	▲9.74
BSP	Shivaramaiah	2,451	1.81%	New
Independent	K. Shivananda	1,910	1.41%	New
Independent	H. R. Chandrashekaraiah	1,084	0.80%	New
Independent	N. C. Puttaraju	843	0.62%	New
Margin of victory		7,590	5.60%	▼5.01
Turnout		135,642	75.39%	▲6.13
Total valid votes		135,573		
Registered electors		179,929		▲23.22
JD(S) gain from INC		Swing	▼1.70	

=== Assembly Election 2004 ===
2004 Karnataka Legislative Assembly election : Maddur
Party	Candidate	Votes	%	±%
INC	D. C. Thammanna	38,991	38.55%	▼20.65
Independent	Siddaraju Ms	28,256	27.94%	New
BJP	Dr. M. Mahesh Chand	17,729	17.53%	New
JD(S)	Vivekanand. B	11,683	11.55%	New
Independent	V. Ashok	2,670	2.64%	New
Urs Samyuktha Paksha	G. C. Chikkaiah	1,112	1.10%	New
Kannada Nadu Party	Dinesh Babu. B. C	699	0.69%	New
Margin of victory		10,735	10.61%	▼20.03
Turnout		101,140	69.26%	▼6.86
Total valid votes		101,140		
Registered electors		146,021		▲10.79
INC hold		Swing	▼20.65	

=== Assembly Election 1999 ===
1999 Karnataka Legislative Assembly election : Maddur
Party	Candidate	Votes	%	±%
INC	S. M. Krishna	56,907	59.20%	▲21.87
JD(U)	Dr. M. Mahesh Chand	27,448	28.55%	New
KRRS	V. Ashok	11,775	12.25%	▼6.82
Margin of victory		29,459	30.64%	▲27.17
Turnout		100,329	76.12%	▼2.49
Total valid votes		96,130		
Rejected ballots		4,132	4.12%	▲2.99
Registered electors		131,800		▲2.69
INC gain from JD		Swing	▲18.40	

=== Assembly Election 1994 ===
1994 Karnataka Legislative Assembly election : Maddur
Party	Candidate	Votes	%	±%
JD	Dr. M. Mahesh Chand	40,695	40.80%	▲39.00
INC	S. M. Krishna	37,231	37.33%	▼5.35
KRRS	H. Srinivasu	19,016	19.07%	New
BJP	T. Chaluvaiah @ Chaluve Gowda	1,560	1.56%	▲0.97
BSP	G. C. Chikkaiah	737	0.74%	New
Margin of victory		3,464	3.47%	▼11.33
Turnout		100,897	78.61%	▲2.17
Total valid votes		99,736		
Rejected ballots		1,143	1.13%	▼3.33
Registered electors		128,351		▲5.47
JD gain from INC		Swing	▼1.88	

=== Assembly Election 1989 ===
1989 Karnataka Legislative Assembly election : Maddur
Party	Candidate	Votes	%	±%
INC	S. M. Krishna	37,935	42.68%	▼3.71
Kranti Sabha	H. Srinivasu	24,784	27.88%	New
JP	M. S. Siddaraju	17,520	19.71%	New
Independent	K. P. Umeshbabu Patel	5,607	6.31%	New
JD	G. P. Ramu	1,603	1.80%	New
Margin of victory		13,151	14.80%	▲10.26
Turnout		93,031	76.44%	▲3.06
Total valid votes		88,880		
Rejected ballots		4,151	4.46%	▲3.48
Registered electors		121,698		▲20.48
INC gain from JP		Swing	▼8.25	

=== Assembly Election 1985 ===
1985 Karnataka Legislative Assembly election : Maddur
Party	Candidate	Votes	%	±%
JP	B. Appaji Gowda	37,381	50.93%	▲9.76
INC	Jayavani M. Manche Gowda	34,047	46.39%	▼8.95
Independent	Shankaraiah	649	0.88%	New
BJP	K. Parvathamallaiah	533	0.73%	New
Margin of victory		3,334	4.54%	▼9.63
Turnout		74,120	73.38%	
Total valid votes		73,391		
Rejected ballots		729	0.98%	
Registered electors		101,010		
JP gain from INC		Swing	▼4.41	

=== Assembly By-election 1984 ===
1984 Karnataka Legislative Assembly by-election : Maddur
Party	Candidate	Votes	%	±%
INC	Jayavani M. Manche Gowda	40,665	55.34%	▲4.35
JP	K. P. Srikantegowda	30,253	41.17%	▲25.43
LKD	M. L. Gangadhar	1,687	2.30%	New
Margin of victory		10,412	14.17%	▼6.83
Total valid votes		73,486		
INC hold		Swing	▲4.35	

=== Assembly Election 1983 ===
1983 Karnataka Legislative Assembly election : Maddur
Party	Candidate	Votes	%	±%
INC	M. Manchegowda	33,600	50.99%	▲32.94
Independent	T. Channegowda	19,758	29.98%	New
JP	B. Appaji Gowda	10,371	15.74%	▼41.42
BJP	B. T. Shreenivasa Gowda	1,572	2.39%	New
Independent	M. T. Indu Kumar	412	0.63%	New
Margin of victory		13,842	21.00%	▼13.61
Turnout		66,846	76.55%	▼6.09
Total valid votes		65,900		
Rejected ballots		946	1.42%	▲0.05
Registered electors		87,324		▲9.19
INC gain from JP		Swing	▼6.17	

=== Assembly Election 1978 ===
1978 Karnataka Legislative Assembly election : Maddur
Party	Candidate	Votes	%	±%
JP	M. Manchegowda	37,261	57.16%	New
INC(I)	A. D. Bili Gowda	14,700	22.55%	New
INC	S. K. Chikkanna	11,765	18.05%	▼30.49
Independent	N. Narasimbhegowda	492	0.75%	New
Independent	B. N. Krishnasetty	416	0.64%	New
Margin of victory		22,561	34.61%	▲27.40
Turnout		66,090	82.64%	▲10.50
Total valid votes		65,184		
Rejected ballots		906	1.37%	▲1.37
Registered electors		79,976		▼0.08
JP gain from INC		Swing	▲8.62	

=== Assembly Election 1972 ===
1972 Mysore State Legislative Assembly election : Maddur
Party	Candidate	Votes	%	±%
INC	A. D. Bili Gowda	27,550	48.54%	▼3.62
Independent	M. Manchegowda	23,458	41.33%	New
INC(O)	K. Raju	4,940	8.70%	New
ABJS	B. T. Srinivasagowda	807	1.42%	New
Margin of victory		4,092	7.21%	▼1.31
Turnout		57,738	72.14%	▼11.46
Total valid votes		56,755		
Registered electors		80,038		▲22.50
INC hold		Swing	▼3.62	

=== Assembly Election 1967 ===
1967 Mysore State Legislative Assembly election : Maddur
Party	Candidate	Votes	%	±%
INC	M. M. Gowda	27,148	52.16%	▲6.12
PSP	S. M. Krishna	22,714	43.64%	New
Independent	Challavenkateshu	2,189	4.21%	New
Margin of victory		4,434	8.52%	▲4.48
Turnout		54,620	83.60%	▲2.77
Total valid votes		52,051		
Registered electors		65,338		▲4.54
INC gain from Independent		Swing	▲2.09	

=== Assembly Election 1962 ===
1962 Mysore State Legislative Assembly election : Maddur
Party	Candidate	Votes	%	±%
Independent	S. M. Krishna	24,269	50.07%	New
INC	H. K. Veeranna Gowda	22,313	46.04%	▼13.76
Socialist Party (India)	Mallaiah	1,884	3.89%	New
Margin of victory		1,956	4.04%	▼15.55
Turnout		50,521	80.83%	▲19.37
Total valid votes		48,466		
Registered electors		62,500		▲19.71
Independent gain from INC		Swing	▼9.73	

=== Assembly Election 1957 ===
1957 Mysore State Legislative Assembly election : Maddur
Party	Candidate	Votes	%	±%
INC	H. K. Veeranna Gowda	19,187	59.80%	▼6.81
PSP	S. K. Chikkanna	12,900	40.20%	New
Margin of victory		6,287	19.59%	▼13.62
Turnout		32,087	61.46%	▼5.88
Total valid votes		32,087		
Registered electors		52,209		▲40.02
INC hold		Swing	▼6.81	

=== Assembly Election 1952 ===
1952 Mysore State Legislative Assembly election : Maddur
Party	Candidate	Votes	%	±%
INC	H. K. Veeranna Gowda	16,724	66.61%	New
KMPP	S. C. Malliah	8,385	33.39%	New
Margin of victory		8,339	33.21%	
Turnout		25,109	67.34%	
Total valid votes		25,109		
Registered electors		37,286		
INC win (new seat)				

== See also ==
- Mandya district
- List of constituencies of Karnataka Legislative Assembly
