= Sonata Software =

Indian information technology company

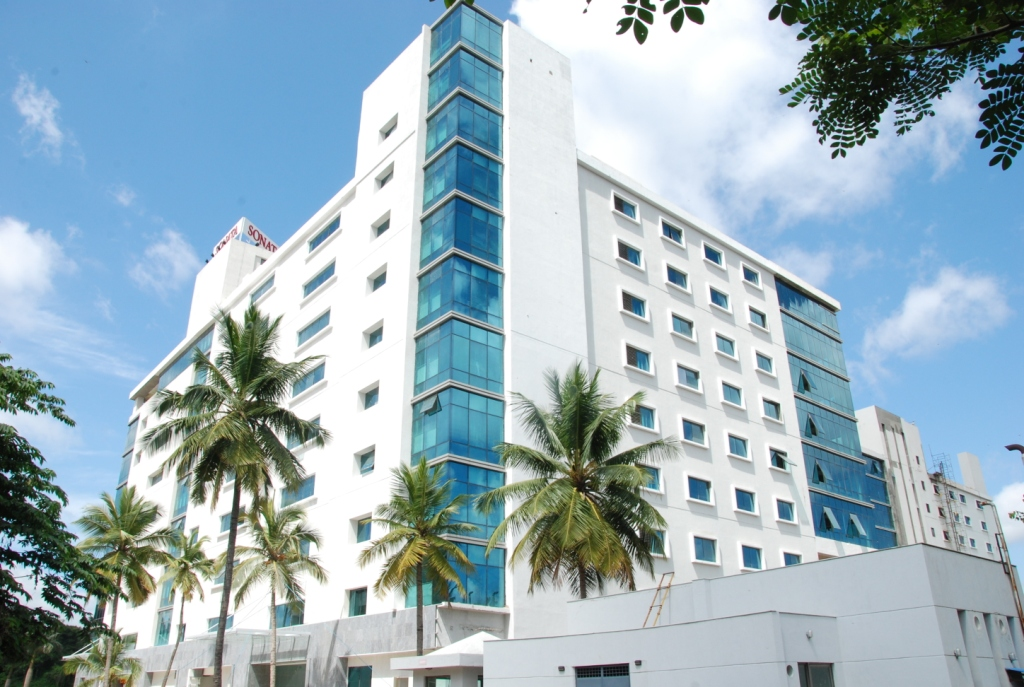
- Headquarters in Global City, Bangalore
- Company type: Public
- Traded as: BSE: 532221; NSE: SONATSOFTW
- Industry: Information technology
- Founded: 1986
- Headquarters: Bangalore, Karnataka, India
- Key people: Rajsekhar Datta Roy (CEO, SSL), Sujit Mohanty (MD and CEO, SITL)
- Revenue: ▲US$1.04 billion (FY24)
- Operating income: ▲US$87 million (FY24)
- Net income: ▲US$58 million (FY24)
- Number of employees: c. 6,400 (2024)
- Website: www.sonata-software.com

Sonata Software Limited is an Indian information technology services company, based in Bangalore. Sonata provides services in business intelligence and analytics, application development management (ADM), mobility, cloud, social media, testing, enterprise services (ERP and CRM), and infrastructure management services. The company's shares are publicly traded on the Indian stock exchanges.

== History ==
Founded in 1986 as the computer software division of Indian Organic Chemicals, the company initially made software package products. Sonata Software was spun off as an independent entity in 1994. The company became a public company and launched its initial public offering in 1998. In 2001, the company obtained SEI-CMMI Level 5 certification and in the following years, set up offices in the US, Europe and Asia Pacific.

In March 2014, it opened an American branch in Redmond, Washington. In August 2014, Sonata Software bought a controlling stake in Rezopia, a travel reservation agency that was the first to use the cloud for taking reservations. It also acquired Xyka, Rezopia's service provider.

In April 2015, the company entered into a partnership with the National Institute of Technology, Tiruchirappalli to promote entrepreneurship by providing resources for NIT, Tiruchirappalli's Centre for Entrepreneurship Development and Incubation. In August 2015, It acquired a 100% stake in Halosys Technologies, which specialized in mobile enterprise. In October 2015, Sonata Software acquired Interactive Business Information Systems Inc (IBIS), a Georgia based supply chain software company founded in 1989.

In August 2016, Parablu, the US-based provider of CASB-enabled cloud security solutions for Enterprises announced a partnership with Sonata Software.

In March 2020, Sonata Software announced the signing of a definitive agreement to acquire Melbourne-based Customer Experience company GAPbuster Limited (GBW).

== Subsidiaries ==
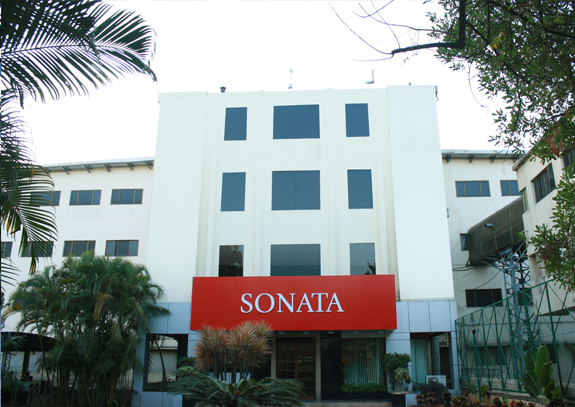
Head Office at Bull Temple Road, Bangalore

Its subsidiaries and affiliates include:

- Sonata Software Limited.
- Sonata Software FZ — LLC
- Sonata Information Technology Limited (SITL)
- Sonata Software North America Inc.
- Sonata Software GmbH
- Sonata Europe Limited
- Encore Software Services
- Sonata Scalable Australia
- Sonata Sopris USA
- Sonata Software Qatar WLL
- Halosys Technologies
- Sonata GBW
- Quant Systems Inc.

== Global offices ==
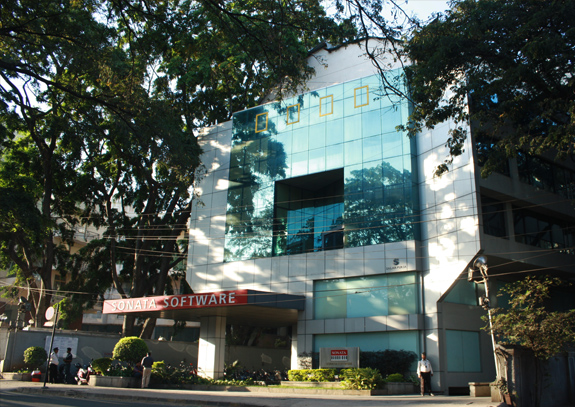
Global Development Center at Richmond Road, Bangalore

=== Asia-Pacific ===
- Singapore: Singapore

=== America ===
- USA: Fremont; Atlanta; Princeton; Newton; Redmond; Schaumburg

=== Europe ===
- Germany: Frankfurt, Hanover
- UK: Middlesex, Cheshire
- Netherlands: Amsterdam

=== Middle-East ===
- UAE: Dubai
- Qatar: Doha

== See also ==
- Fortune India 500
- List of Indian IT companies
- List of companies of India
