= Café Coffee Day =

Coffeehouse chain

Cafe Coffee Day
- Trade name: Café Coffee Day
- Type: Subsidiary of Coffee Day Enterprises
- Traded as: BSE: 539436; NSE: COFFEEDAY (parent company)
- ISIN: INE335K01011
- Industry: Coffeehouse
- Founded: 1996; 30 years ago
- Founder: V. G. Siddhartha
- Headquarters: Coffee Day Square, Vittal Mallya Road, Bengaluru, Karnataka, India
- Number of locations: 550 (2021)
- Area served: Worldwide
- Key people: S. V. Ranganath (Interim Chairman); Malavika Hegde (CEO)
- Products: Coffee; Tea; Pastries; Cappuccino; Smoothies
- Revenue: ▼₹1,024.79 crore (US$110 million) (2021)
- Operating income: ▼₹−559.02 crore (US$−58 million) (2021)
- Net income: ▼₹−583.92 crore (US$−61 million) (2021)
- Total assets: ▼₹6,601.80 crore (US$690 million) (2021)
- Total equity: ▼₹3,896.40 crore (US$400 million) (2021)
- Number of employees: 20,135
- Parent: Coffee Day Enterprises
- Subsidiaries: Café Emporio; Coffee Day Fresh ‘n Ground; Coffee Day Xpress; Coffee Day Take Away; Coffee Day Exports; Coffee Day Perfect; Coffee Day Beverages
- Website: cafecoffeeday.com

Café Coffee Day (CCD) is an Indian multinational chain of coffeehouses headquartered in Bengaluru, Karnataka. It is a subsidiary of Coffee Day Enterprises Limited. Internationally, CCD is present in Austria, the Czech Republic, Malaysia, Nepal, and Egypt.

== History ==
Café Coffee Day Global Limited Company is a Chikkamagaluru-based business that grows coffee in its own estates of 20,000 acres. It is the largest producer of arabica beans in Asia, exporting to various countries including U.S., Europe, and Japan.

V. G. Siddhartha started the café chain in 1996 when he incorporated Coffee Day Global, which is the parent of the Coffee Day chain. The first CCD outlet was set up on July 11, 1996, at Brigade Road, Bangalore, Karnataka. It rapidly expanded to other cities in India, with more than 1,000 cafés open across the nation by 2011.

In 2010, it was announced that a consortium led by Kohlberg Kravis Roberts would invest ₹1,000 crore (equivalent to ₹24 billion or US$250 million in 2026) in Coffee Day Resorts, owned by the company. The same year, the logo was changed to the current logo, which the company stated was to showcase the chain as a place to talk. This was done with major changes in the layout of the stores, including the addition of lounges and a total revamp of the interiors.

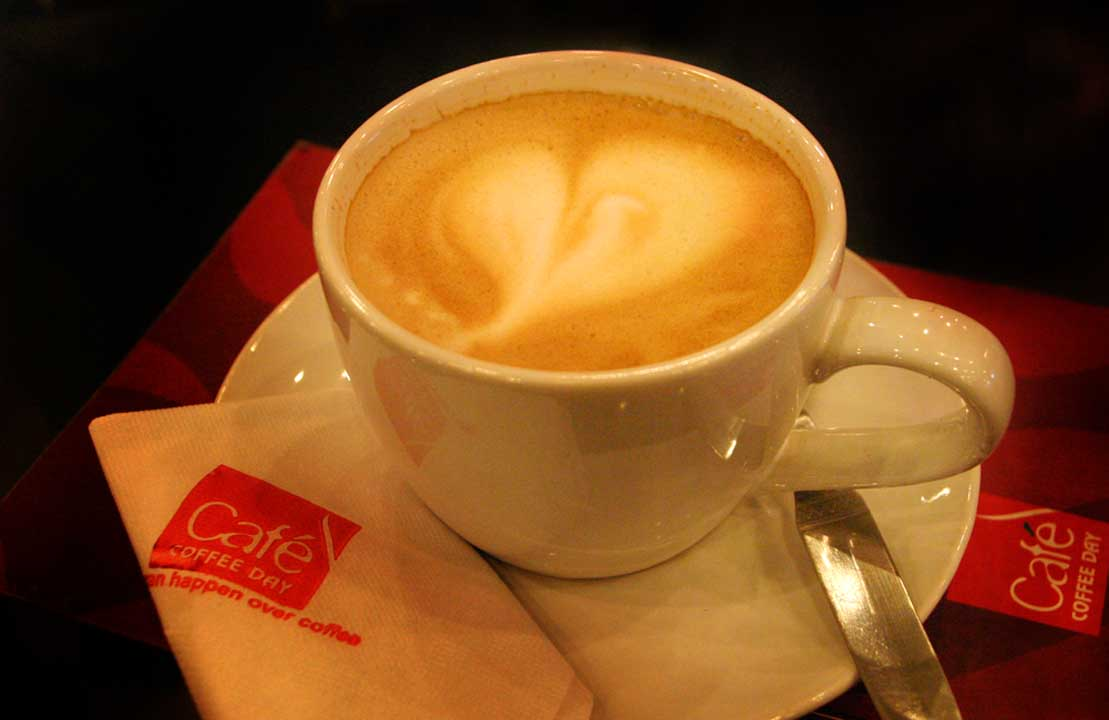
A cup of coffee at Café Coffee Day

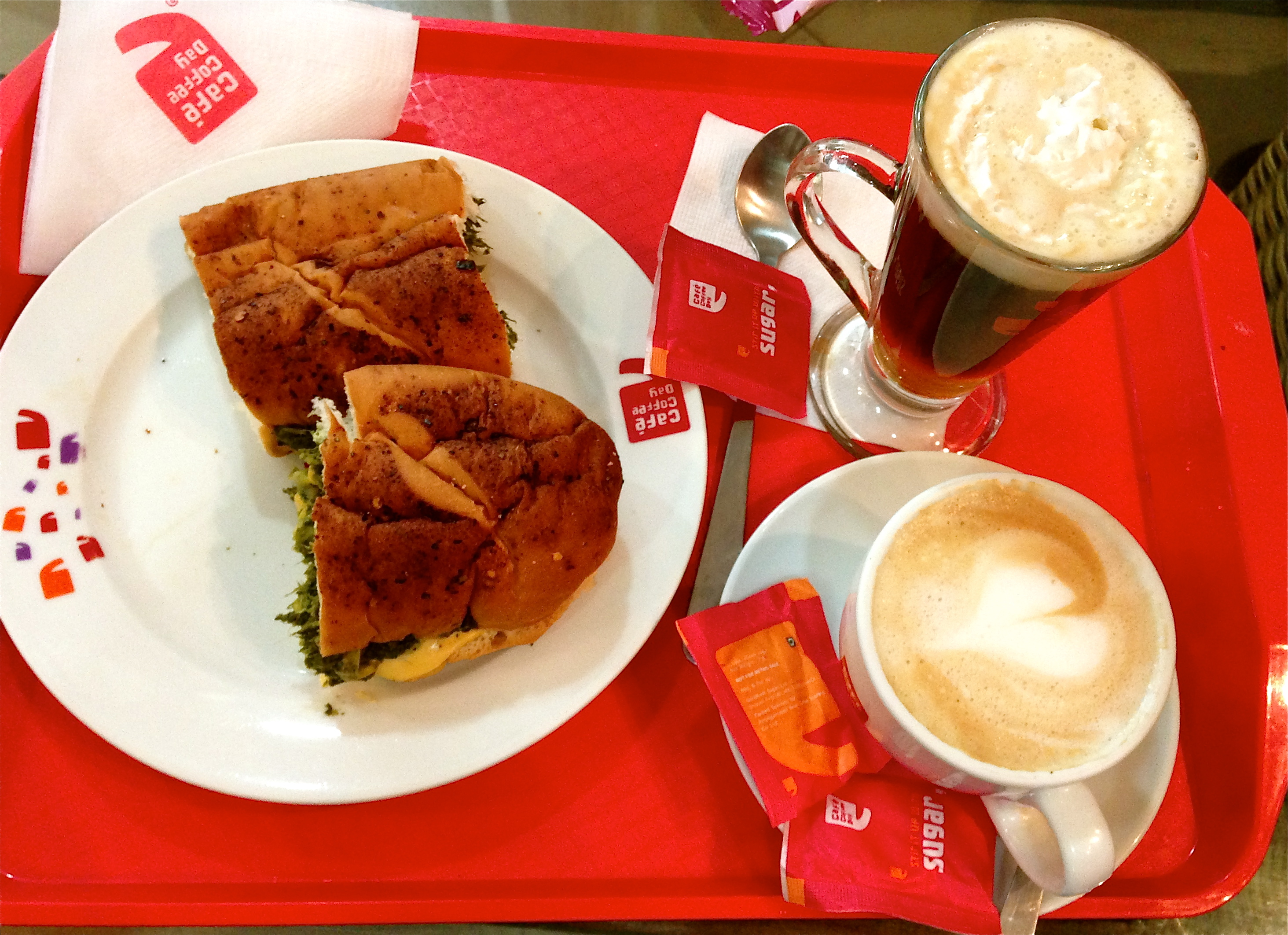
Sandwich, coffee and tea served at CCD

The company is vertically integrated as per the strategy to cut costs: from owning the plantations to growing the coffee, making the coffee machines and making the furniture for the outlets.

On 29 July 2019, Siddhartha went missing, and his body was found in the Nethravathi river backwaters two days later. A letter, assumed to be written by Siddhartha addressing the board of directors and staff, was made public in which he takes responsibility for not creating a profitable business model.

In September 2019, the company appointed auditing firm Ernst and Young to scrutinize their books of accounts. They also indicated the auditor will also look into circumstances of the last letter written by the founder and the points he made in it.

In March 2020, Coffee Day Enterprises Limited announced that it has reached an agreement to sell Global Village Technology Park, a 90-acre tech park on the outskirts of Bengaluru, for a total consideration of ₹2,700 crore for repaying the debt of Cafe Coffee Day's associate firms and their promoters. In 2023, IndusInd Bank filed a bankruptcy petition against Cafe Coffee Day.

== Outlets ==
Prior to Siddhartha's death in 2018, Coffee Day had nearly 1,700 cafes, 500-plus kiosks, more than 400 Fresh & Ground outlets, and over 47,500 vending machines placed in offices of different companies.

As of September 2024, the company had 450 café outlets in 141 cities. As of September 30, 2025, the cafe count stood at 423 while the vending machine business has survived with 55,733 machines.

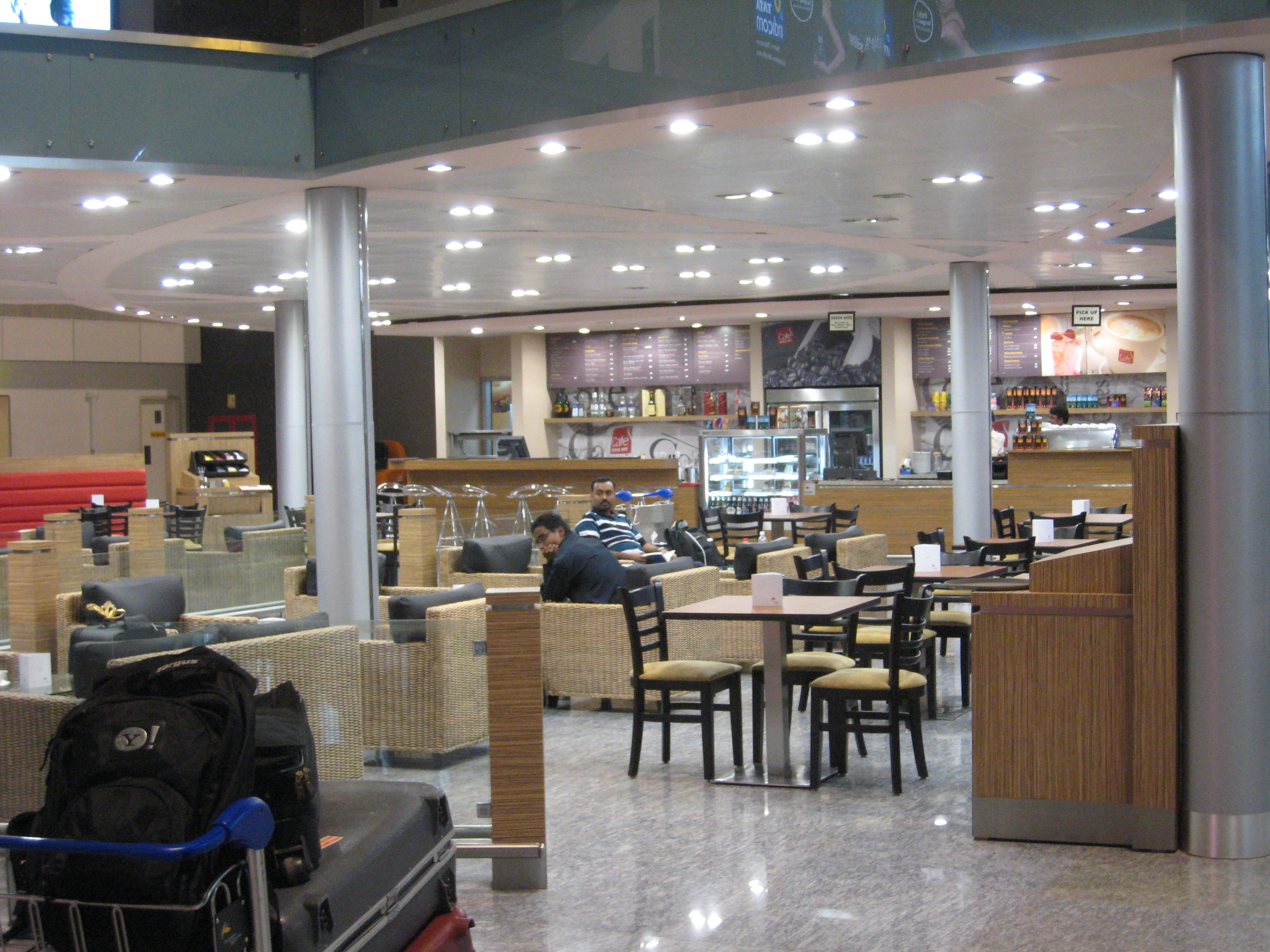
Bangalore Airport

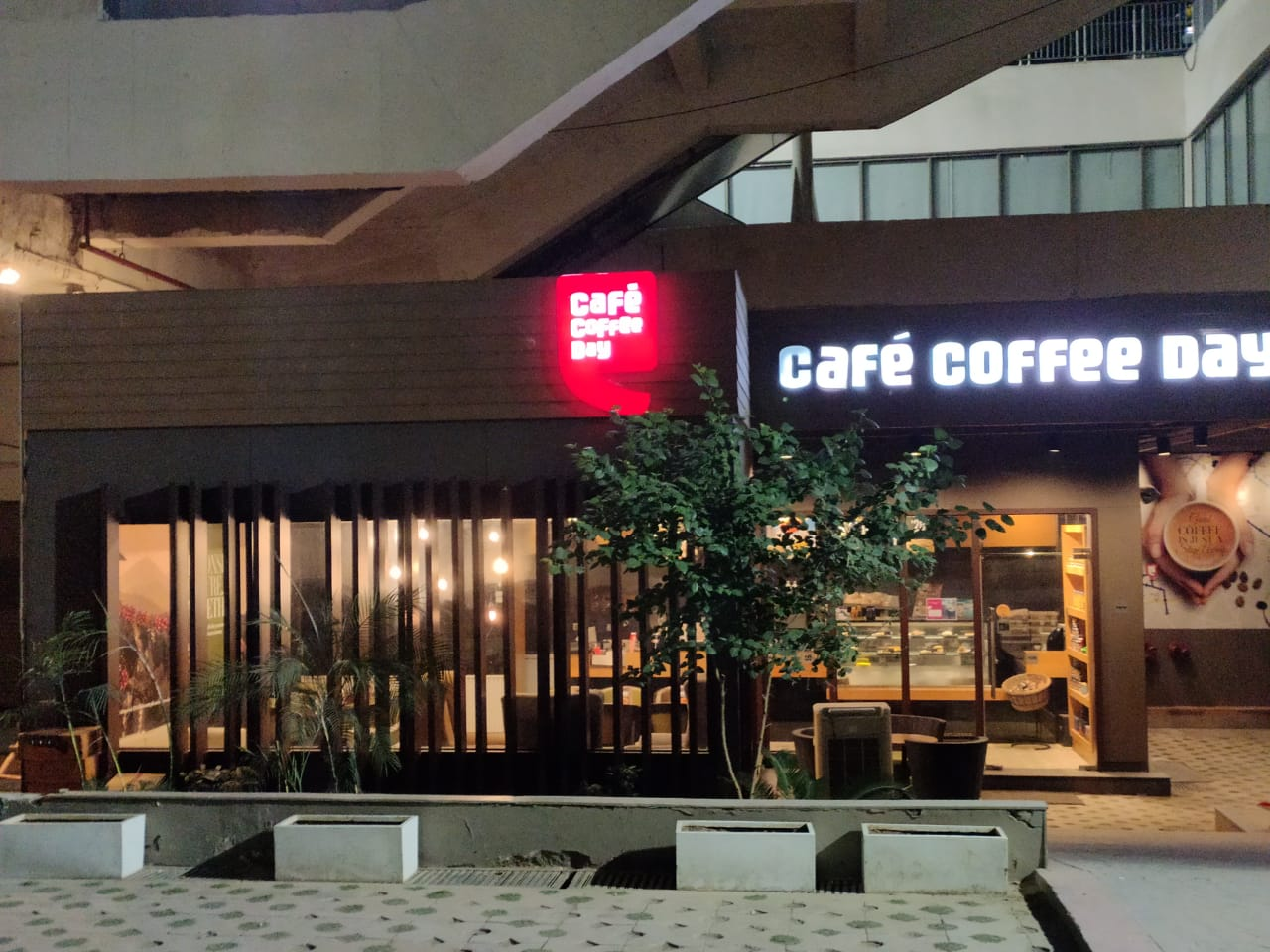
Gurgaon

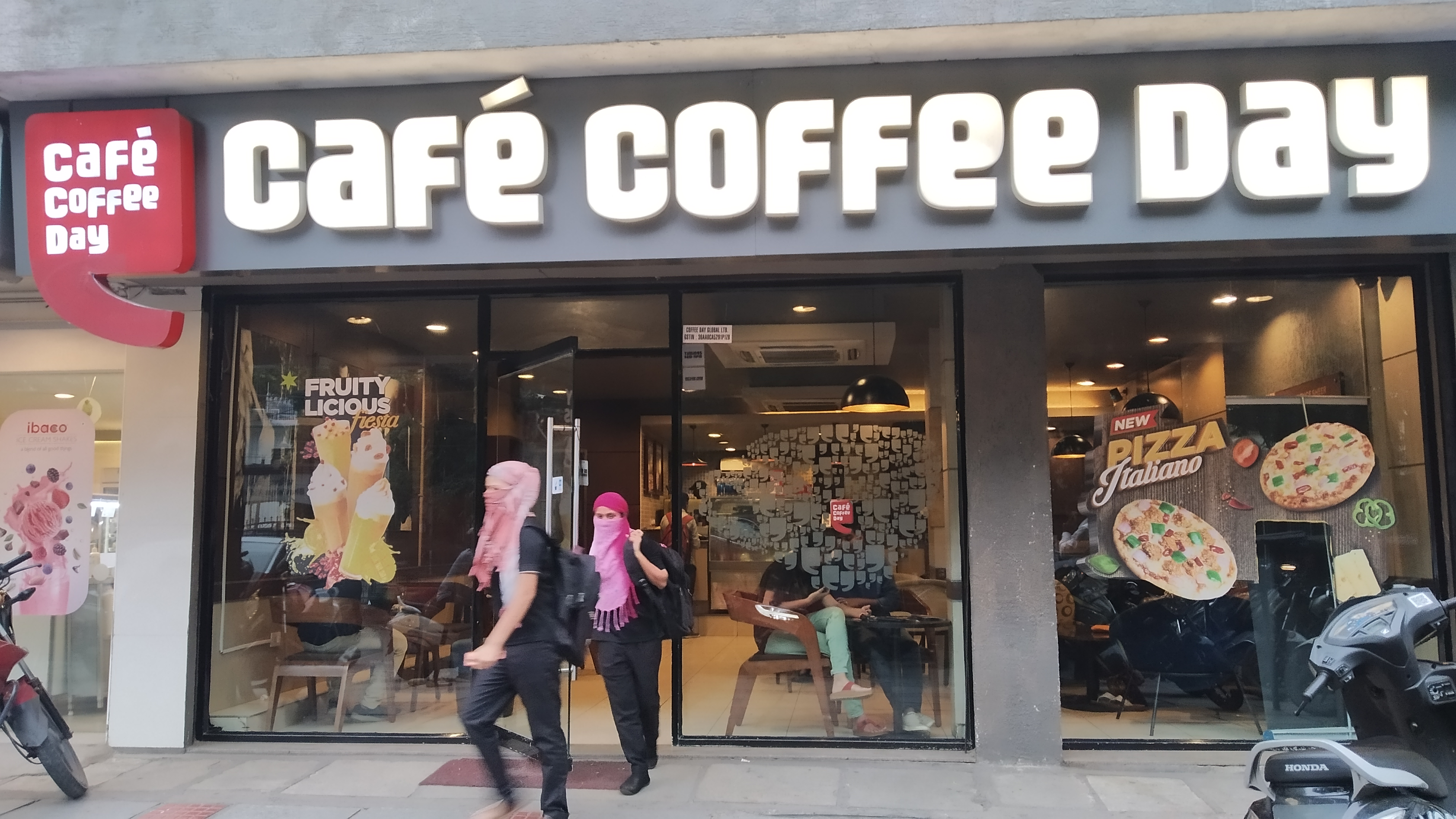
Hyderabad

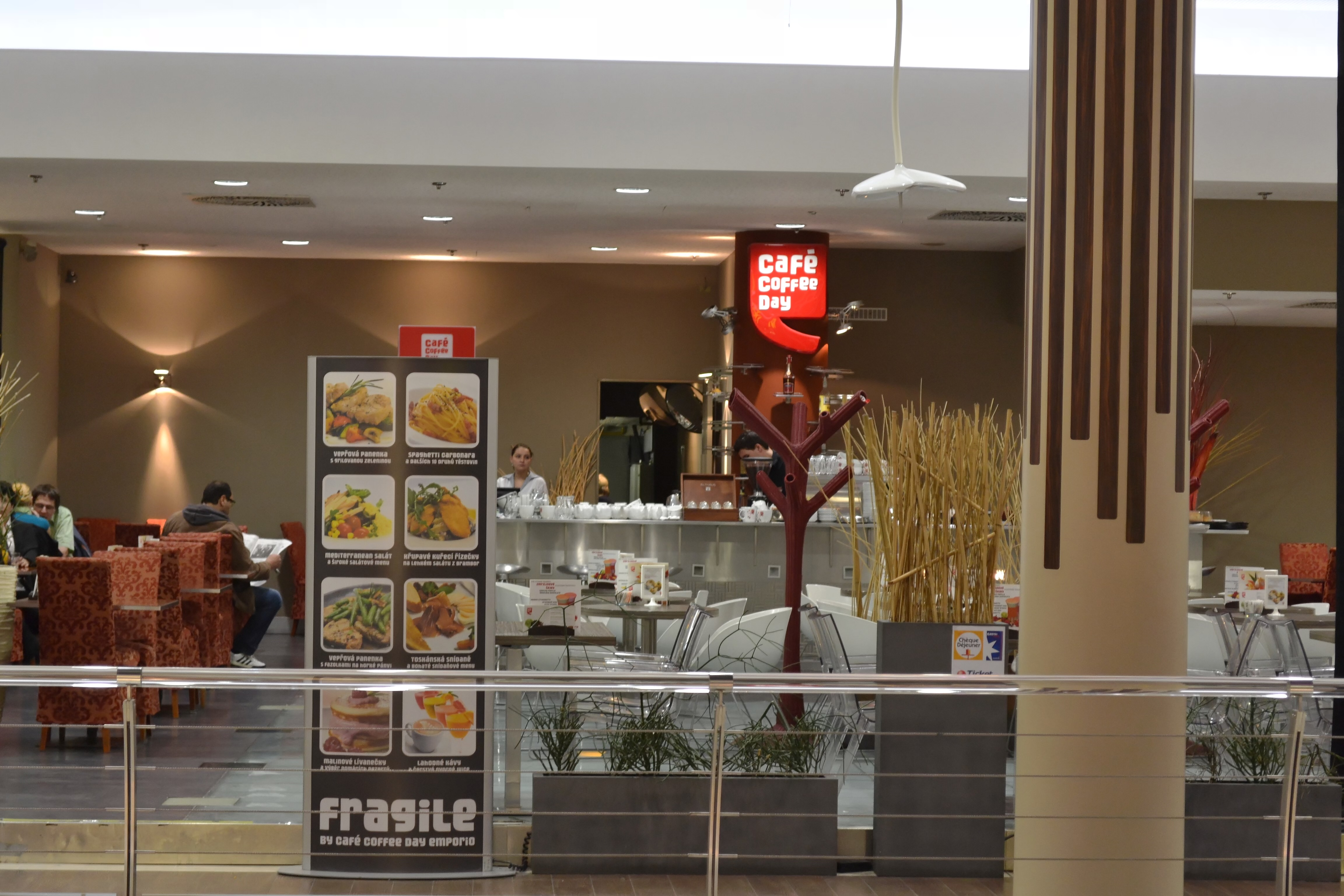
Prague

== Subsidiaries ==
In June 2010, CCD acquired Café Emporio, a café chain from the Czech Republic. At that time, Café Emporio had 11 cafés in the Czech Republic.

Café Coffee Day's divisions include:

- Coffee Day Fresh 'n' Ground, which owns 375 coffee bean and powder retail outlets
- Coffee Day Square, a high-level coffee bar in Bangalore, Kolkata, Chennai, Mumbai and New Delhi
- Coffee Day Xpress, which runs 537 Coffee Day kiosks
- Coffee Day Beverages, which runs over 56,799 vending machines
- Coffee Day Exports, its exporting wing
- Coffee Day Perfect, its fast-moving consumer goods packaged coffee division
- Coffee Day B2C Plant, coffee vending machine manufacturing division

== See also ==
- List of coffeehouse chains
- Tata Starbucks
