= Fourth Indira Gandhi ministry =

Union Council of Ministers headed by Indira Gandhi

- 11th ministry of the Republic of India
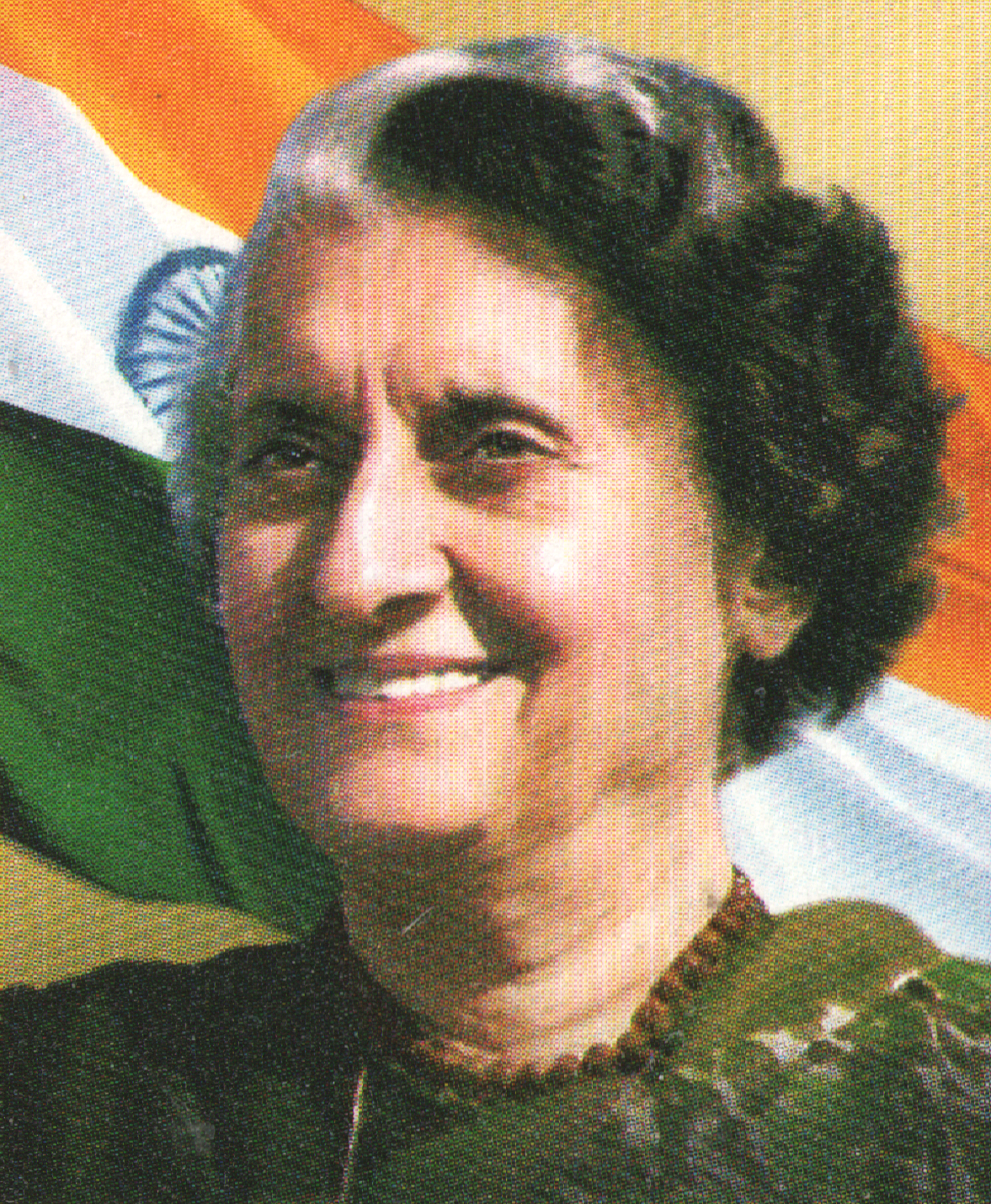
- Date formed: 14 January 1980
- Date dissolved: 31 October 1984

People and organisations
- Head of state: Neelam Sanjiva Reddy (until 1982); Zail Singh (from 1982)
- Head of government: Indira Gandhi
- Member party: Indian National Congress (I)
- Status in legislature: Majority
- Opposition party: Bharatiya Jana Sangh
- Opposition leader: Vacant (in Lok Sabha); Lal Krishna Advani (in Rajya Sabha) (21 January 1980 – 7 April 1980)

History
- Election: 1980
- Outgoing election: 1984
- Legislature terms: 4 years, 9 months and 17 days
- Predecessor: Charan Singh ministry
- Successor: First Rajiv Gandhi ministry

The Fourth Indira Gandhi ministry was formed on 14 January 1980 after the Congress (I)'s victory in the 1980 general election. Indira Gandhi was sworn-in as the Prime Minister for the fourth time and also marked her return to the premiership after three years since her defeat in 1977.

The ministry remained in office until the assassination of Indira Gandhi on 31 October 1984. She was succeeded by her son Rajiv Gandhi as the Prime minister.

== Composition ==
=== Cabinet Ministers ===
Portfolio	Minister	Took office	Left office	Party	Remarks
Prime Minister; Department of Atomic Energy; And also in-charge of all other important portfolios and policy issuesnot allocated to any Minister.	Indira Gandhi	14 January 1980	31 October 1984	INC(I)	
Minister of Defence	Indira Gandhi	14 January 1980	15 January 1982	INC(I)	Prime Minister was responsible.
Minister of Defence	Ramaswamy Venkataraman	15 January 1982	2 August 1984	INC(I)	
Minister of Defence	Shankarrao Chavan	2 August 1984	31 October 1984	INC(I)	
Minister of External Affairs	P. V. Narasimha Rao	14 January 1980	19 July 1984	INC(I)	
Minister of External Affairs	Indira Gandhi	19 July 1984	31 October 1984	INC(I)	Prime Minister was responsible.
Minister of Finance	Ramaswamy Venkataraman	14 January 1980	15 January 1982	INC(I)	
Minister of Finance	Pranab Mukherjee	15 January 1982	31 August 1984	INC(I)	
Minister of Home Affairs	Zail Singh	14 January 1980	22 June 1982	INC(I)	
Minister of Home Affairs	Ramaswamy Venkataraman	22 June 1982	2 September 1982	INC(I)	
Minister of Home Affairs	Prakash Chandra Sethi	2 September 1982	19 July 1984	INC(I)	
Minister of Home Affairs	P. V. Narasimha Rao	19 July 1984	31 October 1984	INC(I)	
Minister of Agriculture	Rao Birender Singh	14 January 1980	31 October 1984	INC(I)	
Minister of Education and Culture; Deputy Minister in the Department of Social Welfare	B. Shankaranand	14 January 1980	19 October 1980	INC(I)	
Minister of Education and Culture; Deputy Minister in the Department of Social Welfare	Shankarrao Chavan	19 October 1980	8 August 1981	INC(I)	
Minister of Education and Culture; Deputy Minister in the Department of Social Welfare	Sheila Kaul	8 August 1981	31 October 1984	INC(I)	Minister of State (I/C) was responsible.
Minister of Energy	A. B. A. Ghani Khan Choudhury	14 January 1980	2 September 1982	INC(I)	
Minister of Energy	P. Shiv Shankar	2 September 1982	31 October 1984	INC(I)	
Minister in the Department of Coal	A. B. A. Ghani Khan Choudhury	16 January 1980	15 January 1982	INC(I)	
Minister in the Department of Coal	N. D. Tiwari	2 September 1982	6 September 1982	INC(I)	The ministry was merged with Ministry of Energy.
Minister of Irrigation	A. B. A. Ghani Khan Choudhury	14 January 1980	8 June 1980	INC(I)	
Minister of Irrigation	Kedar Pandey	8 June 1980	12 November 1980	INC(I)	
Minister of Irrigation	Rao Birender Singh	12 November 1980	15 January 1982	INC(I)	
Minister of Irrigation	Kedar Pandey	15 January 1982	29 January 1983	INC(I)	
Minister of Irrigation	Ram Niwas Mirdha	29 January 1983	2 August 1984	INC(I)	Minister of State (I/C) was responsible.
Minister of Irrigation	Prakash Chandra Sethi	2 August 1984	31 October 1984	INC(I)	
Minister of Information and Broadcasting	Vasant Sathe	14 January 1980	2 September 1982	INC(I)	
Minister of Information and Broadcasting	N. K. P. Salve	2 September 1982	14 February 1983	INC(I)	Minister of State (I/C) was responsible.
Minister of Information and Broadcasting	H. K. L. Bhagat	14 February 1983	31 October 1984	INC(I)	Minister of State (I/C) was responsible.
Minister of Law, Justice and Company Affairs	P. Shiv Shankar	14 January 1980	15 January 1982	INC(I)	
Minister of Law, Justice and Company Affairs	Jagannath Kaushal	15 January 1982	31 October 1984	INC(I)	
Minister of Railways	Kamalapati Tripathi	14 January 1980	12 November 1980	INC(I)	
Minister of Railways	Kedar Pandey	12 November 1980	15 January 1982	INC(I)	
Minister of Railways	Prakash Chandra Sethi	15 January 1982	2 September 1982	INC(I)	
Minister of Railways	A. B. A. Ghani Khan Choudhury	19 July 1984	31 October 1984	INC(I)	
Minister of Shipping and Transport	Anant Prasad Sharma	14 January 1980	19 October 1980	INC(I)	
Minister of Shipping and Transport	Veerendra Patil	19 October 1980	2 September 1982	INC(I)	
Minister of Shipping and Transport	C. M. Stephen	2 September 1982	2 February 1983	INC(I)	
Minister of Shipping and Transport	Kotla Vijaya Bhaskara Reddy	2 February 1983	7 September 1984	INC(I)	
Minister of Shipping and Transport	Veerendra Patil	7 September 1984	31 October 1984	INC(I)	
Minister of Tourism and Civil Aviation	Janaki Ballabh Patnaik	14 January 1980	8 June 1980	INC(I)	
Minister of Tourism and Civil Aviation	Anant Prasad Sharma	8 June 1980	2 September 1982	INC(I)	Bifurcated into Ministry of Tourism and Ministry of Civil Aviation.
Minister of Civil Aviation	Bhagwat Jha Azad	2 September 1982	14 February 1983	INC(I)	Minister of State (I/C) was responsible.
Minister of Tourism	Khurshed Alam Khan	2 September 1982	14 February 1983	INC(I)	Minister of State (I/C) was responsible.
Minister of Tourism and Civil Aviation	Khurshed Alam Khan	14 February 1983	31 October 1984	INC(I)	Minister of State (I/C) was responsible.
Minister of Works and Housing	Prakash Chandra Sethi	14 January 1980	19 October 1980	INC(I)	
Minister of Works and Housing	Bhishma Narain Singh	19 October 1980	29 January 1983	INC(I)	
Minister of Works and Housing	Buta Singh	29 January 1983	31 October 1984	INC(I)	
Minister of Parliamentary Affairs	Bhishma Narain Singh	14 January 1980	29 January 1983	INC(I)	
Minister of Parliamentary Affairs	Buta Singh	29 January 1983	31 October 1984	INC(I)	
Minister of Commerce	Pranab Mukherjee	14 January 1980	15 January 1982	INC(I)	
Minister of Commerce	Shivraj Patil	15 January 1982	29 January 1983	INC(I)	Minister of State (I/C) was responsible.
Minister of Commerce	V. P. Singh	29 January 1983	7 September 1984	INC(I)	
Minister of Commerce	Pranab Mukherjee	7 September 1984	31 October 1984	INC(I)	
Minister of Industry	Ramaswamy Venkataraman	16 January 1980	3 April 1980	INC(I)	
Minister of Industry	Indira Gandhi	3 April 1980	8 August 1981	INC(I)	Prime Minister was responsible.
Minister of Industry	N. D. Tiwari	8 August 1981	3 August 1984	INC(I)	
Minister of Industry	Indira Gandhi	3 August 1984	14 August 1984	INC(I)	Prime Minister was responsible.
Minister of Industry	V. P. Singh	14 August 1984	7 September 1984	INC(I)	
Minister of Industry	Kotla Vijaya Bhaskara Reddy	7 September 1984	31 October 1984	INC(I)	
Ministry of Petroleum and Chemicals	Prakash Chandra Sethi	16 January 1980	7 March 1980	INC(I)	
Ministry of Petroleum and Chemicals	Veerendra Patil	7 March 1980	19 October 1980	INC(I)	
Ministry of Petroleum and Chemicals	Prakash Chandra Sethi	19 October 1980	15 January 1982	INC(I)	
Ministry of Petroleum and Chemicals	P. Shiv Shankar	15 January 1982	2 September 1982	INC(I)	Bifurcated into Department of Petroleum and Ministry of Chemicals and Fertilizers.
Minister of Chemicals and Fertilizers	Vasant Sathe	2 September 1982	31 October 1984	INC(I)	
Minister of Health and Family Welfare	B. Shankaranand	16 January 1980	31 October 1980	INC(I)	
Minister of Communications	Bhishma Narain Singh	16 January 1980	3 March 1980	INC(I)	
Minister of Communications	C. M. Stephen	3 March 1980	2 September 1982	INC(I)	
Minister of Communications	Anant Prasad Sharma	2 September 1982	14 February 1983	INC(I)	
Minister of Communications	Indira Gandhi	14 February 1983	31 October 1984	INC(I)	Prime Minister was responsible.
Minister of Steel and Mines	Pranab Mukherjee	16 January 1980	15 January 1982	INC(I)	
Minister of Steel and Mines	N. D. Tiwari	15 January 1982	14 February 1983	INC(I)	
Minister of Steel and Mines	N. K. P. Salve	14 February 1983	31 October 1984	INC(I)	Minister of State (I/C) was responsible.
Minister of Civil Supplies	Pranab Mukherjee	16 January 1980	8 June 1980	INC(I)	
Minister of Civil Supplies	Vidya Charan Shukla	8 June 1980	19 March 1981	INC(I)	
Minister of Civil Supplies	Rao Birender Singh	19 March 1981	2 September 1982	INC(I)	Renamed as Civil Supplies and Cooperation.
Minister of Civil Supplies and Cooperation	Bhagwat Jha Azad	2 September 1982	29 January 1983	INC(I)	Minister of State (I/C) was responsible.
Minister of Civil Supplies and Cooperation	Bhishma Narain Singh	29 January 1983	14 February 1983	INC(I)	
Minister of Civil Supplies and Cooperation	Bhagwat Jha Azad	14 February 1983	31 October 1984	INC(I)	Minister of State (I/C) was responsible.
Minister of Labour	Janaki Ballabh Patnaik	16 January 1980	8 June 1980	INC(I)	
Minister of Labour	Indira Gandhi	8 June 1980	19 October 1980	INC(I)	Prime Minister was responsible.
Minister of Labour	N. D. Tiwari	19 October 1980	15 January 1982	INC(I)	
Minister of Labour	Bhagwat Jha Azad	15 January 1982	2 September 1982	INC(I)	Minister of State (I/C) was responsible. Merged with Department of Rehabilitation to form Ministry of Labour and Rehabilitation.
Minister of Labour and Rehabilitation	Veerendra Patil	2 September 1982	31 October 1984	INC(I)	
Minister of Supply and Rehabilitation	Vasant Sathe	14 January 1980	19 October 1980	INC(I)	
Minister of Supply and Rehabilitation	Bhagwat Jha Azad	19 October 1980	15 January 1982	INC(I)	Minister of State (I/C) was responsible.
Minister of Supply and Rehabilitation	Buta Singh	15 January 1982	2 September 1982	INC(I)	Minister of State (I/C) was responsible. Bifurcated into Ministry of Labour and Department of Rehabilitation.
Minister of Supply and Sports	Buta Singh	2 September 1982	29 January 1983	INC(I)	Minister of State (I/C) was responsible.
Minister of Supply and Sports	Buta Singh	29 January 1983	31 October 1984	INC(I)	
Minister of Rural Reconstruction	Rao Birender Singh	20 January 1980	23 January 1982	INC(I)	Renamed as Rural Development.
Minister of Rural Development	Rao Birender Singh	23 January 1982	29 January 1983	INC(I)	
Minister of Rural Development	Harinath Mishra	29 January 1983	2 August 1984	INC(I)	Minister of State (I/C) was responsible.
Minister of Rural Development	Mohsina Kidwai	2 August 1984	31 October 1984	INC(I)	Minister of State (I/C) was responsible.
Minister of Planning	N. D. Tiwari	8 June 1980	8 August 1971	INC(I)	
Minister of Planning	Shankarrao Chavan	8 August 1981	19 July 1984	INC(I)	
Minister of Planning	Prakash Chandra Sethi	19 July 1984	31 October 1984	INC(I)	Minister of State (I/C) was responsible.
Minister in the Department of Electronics; Minister in the Department of Science and Technology; Minister in the Department of Space	Indira Gandhi	19 October 1980	31 October 1984	INC(I)	Prime Minister was responsible.

=== Ministers of State ===
Portfolio	Minister	Took office	Left office	Party	Remarks
Minister of State in the Ministry of Agriculture	R. V. Swaminathan	14 January 1980	29 January 1983	INC(I)	
Minister of State in the Ministry of Agriculture	Ram Baleshwar	16 January 1982	29 January 1983	INC(I)	
Minister of State in the Ministry of Agriculture	Yogendra Makwana	29 January 1983	31 October 1984	INC(I)	
Minister of State in the Ministry of Finance	Jagannath Pahadia	14 January 1980	6 June 1980	INC(I)	
Minister of State in the Ministry of Finance	Sawai Singh Sisodiya (Revenue and Expenditure)	19 October 1980	2 September 1982	INC(I)	
Minister of State in the Ministry of Finance	S. B. P. Pattabhirama Rao	2 September 1982	7 February 1984	INC(I)	
Minister of State in the Ministry of Finance	S. M. Krishna	7 February 1984	7 September 1984	INC(I)	
Minister of State in the Ministry of Health and Family Welfare	Nihar Ranjan Laskar	14 January 1980	15 January 1982	INC(I)	
Minister of State in the Ministry of Health and Family Welfare	Mohsina Kidwai	29 January 1983	2 August 1984	INC(I)	
Minister of State in the Ministry of Home Affairs	Pendekanti Venkatasubbaiah	14 January 1980	31 October 1984	INC(I)	
Minister of State in the Ministry of Home Affairs	Yogendra Makwana	14 January 1980	15 January 1982	INC(I)	
Minister of State in the Ministry of Home Affairs	Nihar Ranjan Laskar	15 January 1982	7 February 1984	INC(I)	
Minister of State in the Ministry of Home Affairs	Ram Dulari Sinha	7 February 1984	31 October 1984	INC(I)	
Minister of State in the Ministry of Railways	C. K. Jaffer Sharief	14 January 1980	31 October 1984	INC(I)	
Minister of State in the Ministry of Tourism and Civil Aviation	Kartik Oraon	14 January 1980	8 June 1980	INC(I)	
Minister of State in the Ministry of Tourism and Civil Aviation	Chandulal Chandrakar	8 June 1980	15 January 1982	INC(I)	
Minister of State in the Ministry of Tourism and Civil Aviation	Khurshed Alam Khan	15 January 1982	2 September 1982	INC(I)	
Minister of State in the Ministry of Parliamentary Affairs	Pendekanti Venkatasubbaiah	16 January 1980	2 September 1982	INC(I)	
Minister of State in the Ministry of Parliamentary Affairs	Sitaram Kesri	3 March 1980	15 January 1982	INC(I)	
Minister of State in the Ministry of Parliamentary Affairs	H. K. L. Bhagat	2 September 1982	31 October 1984	INC(I)	
Minister of State in the Ministry of Parliamentary Affairs	Kalpnath Rai	29 January 1983	31 October 1984	INC(I)	
Minister of State in the Ministry of Defence	C. P. N. Singh	3 March 1980	19 October 1980	INC(I)	
Minister of State in the Ministry of Defence	Shivraj Patil	19 October 1980	15 January 1982	INC(I)	
Minister of State in the Ministry of Defence	Kamakhya Prasad Singh Deo	29 January 1983	31 October 1984	INC(I)	
Minister of State in the Ministry of Industry	Charanjit Chanana	3 March 1980	2 September 1982	INC(I)	
Minister of State in the Ministry of Industry	Ram Dulari Sinha	15 January 1982	14 February 1983	INC(I)	
Minister of State in the Ministry of Industry	Virbhadra Singh	2 September 1982	8 April 1983	INC(I)	
Minister of State in the Ministry of Industry	S. M. Krishna	29 January 1983	7 February 1984	INC(I)	
Minister of State in the Ministry of Industry	S. B. P. Pattabhirama Rao	7 February 1984	31 October 1984	INC(I)	
Minister of State in the Ministry of Industry	Nihar Ranjan Laskar	7 September 1984	31 October 1984	INC(I)	
Minister of State in the Ministry of Commerce	Ziaur Rahman Ansari	3 March 1980	19 October 1980	INC(I)	
Minister of State in the Ministry of Commerce	Khurshed Alam Khan	19 October 1980	15 January 1982	INC(I)	
Minister of State in the Ministry of Commerce	Ram Dulari Sinha	14 February 1983	7 February 1984	INC(I)	
Minister of State in the Ministry of Commerce	Nihar Ranjan Laskar	7 February 1984	7 September 1984	INC(I)	
Minister of State in the Ministry of Commerce	S. M. Krishna	7 September 1984	31 October 1984	INC(I)	
Minister of State in the Ministry of Communications	Kartik Oraon	8 June 1980	8 December 1981	INC(I)	
Minister of State in the Ministry of Communications	Yogendra Makwana	15 January 1982	29 January 1983	INC(I)	
Minister of State in the Ministry of Communications	Vitthalrao Gadgil	29 January 1983	31 October 1984	INC(I)	
Minister of State in the Ministry of Petroleum and Chemicals	Chaudhary Dalbir Singh	8 June 1980	2 September 1982	INC(I)	Bifurcated into Ministry of Petroleum and Ministry of Chemicals and Fertilizers.
Minister of State in the Ministry of Petroleum	Chaudhary Dalbir Singh	2 September 1982	29 January 1983	INC(I)	Merged with Ministry of Energy.
Minister of State in the Ministry of Chemicals and Fertilizers	Chaudhary Dalbir Singh	2 September 1982	29 January 1983	INC(I)	
Minister of State in the Ministry of Chemicals and Fertilizers	Ramchandra Rath	2 September 1982	31 October 1984	INC(I)	
Minister of State in the Ministry of Labour	T. Anjaiah	8 June 1980	11 October 1980	INC(I)	
Minister of State in the Ministry of Labour and Rehabilitation	Ram Dulari Sinha	19 October 1980	15 January 1982	INC(I)	
Minister of State in the Ministry of Labour and Rehabilitation	Mohsina Kidwai	11 September 1982	29 January 1983	INC(I)	
Minister of State in the Ministry of Labour and Rehabilitation	Dharam Vir	29 January 1983	31 October 1984	INC(I)	
Minister of State in the Ministry of Shipping and Transport	Buta Singh	8 June 1980	15 January 1982	INC(I)	
Minister of State in the Ministry of Shipping and Transport	Sitaram Kesri	15 January 1982	29 January 1983	INC(I)	
Minister of State in the Ministry of Shipping and Transport	Ziaur Rahman Ansari	29 January 1983	31 October 1984	INC(I)	
Minister of State in the Ministry of Energy	Vikram Chand Mahajan	8 June 1980	29 January 1980	INC(I)	
Minister of State in the Ministry of Energy	Gargi Shankar Mishra (Coal)	15 January 1982	6 September 1982	INC(I)	
Minister of State in the Ministry of Energy	Chaudhary Dalbir Singh (Petroleum)	2 September 1982	29 January 1983	INC(I)	
Minister of State in the Ministry of Energy	C. P. N. Singh (Non-Conventional Energy Sources)	2 September 1982	2 February 1983	INC(I)	
Minister of State in the Ministry of Energy	Gargi Shankar Mishra	6 September 1982	29 January 1983	INC(I)	
Minister of State in the Ministry of Energy	Chaudhary Dalbir Singh (Coal)	29 January 1983	31 October 1984	INC(I)	
Minister of State in the Ministry of Energy	Gargi Shankar Mishra (Petroleum)	29 January 1983	31 October 1984	INC(I)	
Minister of State in the Ministry of Energy	Chandrashekhar Singh (Power)	29 January 1983	14 August 1983	INC(I)	
Minister of State in the Ministry of Energy	Arif Mohammad Khan	7 February 1984	31 October 1984	INC(I)	
Minister of State in the Ministry of Information and Broadcasting	Ram Dulari Sinha	8 June 1980	19 October 1980	INC(I)	
Minister of State in the Ministry of Irrigation	Ziaur Rahman Ansari	19 October 1980	29 January 1983	INC(I)	
Minister of State in the Ministry of Irrigation	Harinath Mishra	2 August 1984	31 October 1984	INC(I)	
Minister of State in the Ministry of Education and Culture; Minister of State in the Department of Social Welfare	Sheila Kaul	19 October 1980	8 August 1981	INC(I)	
Minister of State in the Department of Science and Technology	C. P. N. Singh	19 October 1980	2 February 1983	INC(I)	
Minister of State in the Department of Science and Technology	Shivraj Patil	29 January 1983	31 October 1984	INC(I)	
Minister of State in the Department of Electronics	C. P. N. Singh	30 October 1980	2 February 1983	INC(I)	
Minister of State in the Department of Electronics	Shivraj Patil	29 January 1983	31 October 1984	INC(I)	
Minister of State in the Ministry of Rural Reconstruction	R. V. Swaminathan	24 November 1980	29 January 1983	INC(I)	
Minister of State in the Ministry of Steel and Mines	Charanjit Chanana	15 January 1982	2 September 1982	INC(I)	
Minister of State in the Ministry of Steel and Mines	Ram Dulari Sinha	15 January 1982	14 February 1983	INC(I)	
Minister of State in the Ministry of Steel and Mines	Gargi Shankar Mishra	2 September 1982	6 September 1982	INC(I)	
Minister of State in the Ministry of Law, Justice and Company Affairs	A. A. Rahim	15 January 1982	2 September 1982	INC(I)	
Minister of State in the Department of Environment	C. P. N. Singh	15 January 1982	2 September 1982	INC(I)	
Minister of State in the Department of Ocean Development	C. P. N. Singh	15 February 1982	2 February 1983	INC(I)	
Minister of State in the Department of Ocean Development	Shivraj Patil	29 January 1983	31 October 1984	INC(I)	
Minister of State in the Ministry of Works and Housing	H. K. L. Bhagat	2 September 1982	14 February 1983	INC(I)	
Minister of State in the Ministry of External Affairs	A. A. Rahim	2 September 1982	31 October 1984	INC(I)	
Minister of State in the Ministry of External Affairs	Ram Niwas Mirdha	2 August 1984	31 October 1984	INC(I)	
Minister of State in the Department of Space; Minister of State in the Department of Atomic Energy	Shivraj Patil	29 January 1983	31 October 1984	INC(I)	

=== Deputy Ministers ===
Portfolio	Minister	Took office	Left office	Party	Remarks
Deputy Minister in the Ministry of Railways	Mallikarjun Goud	8 June 1980	29 January 1983	INC(I)	
Deputy Minister in the Ministry of Industry	P. Venkata Reddy	8 June 1980	19 October 1980	INC(I)	
Deputy Minister in the Ministry of Industry	P. A. Sangma	31 October 1980	15 February 1982	INC(I)	
Deputy Minister in the Ministry of Industry	Kalpnath Rai	15 February 1982	29 January 1983	INC(I)	
Deputy Minister in the Minister of Works and Housing	Mohammed Usman Arif	8 June 1980	15 January 1982	INC(I)	
Deputy Minister in the Minister of Works and Housing	Mallikarjun Goud	15 January 1982	31 October 1984	INC(I)	
Deputy Minister in the Minister of Works and Housing	Brajamohan Mohanty	15 January 1982	29 January 1983	INC(I)	
Deputy Minister in the Minister of Works and Housing	Mohammed Usman Arif	14 February 1983	31 October 1984	INC(I)	
Deputy Minister in the Ministry of Finance	Maganbhai Barot	8 June 1980	15 January 1982	INC(I)	
Deputy Minister in the Ministry of Finance	Janardhana Poojary (Banking and Insurance)	15 January 1982	31 October 1984	INC(I)	
Deputy Minister in the Department of Science and Technology; Deputy Minister in the Department of Space	Vijaykumar Naval Patil	8 June 1980	19 October 1980	INC(I)	
Deputy Minister in the Ministry of Supply and Rehabilition	Prem Khandu Thungon	8 June 1980	15 January 1982	INC(I)	
Deputy Minister in the Ministry of Supply and Rehabilition	Giridhar Gamang	15 January 1982	6 September 1982	INC(I)	
Deputy Minister in the Ministry of Agriculture	Kamla Kumari	19 October 1980	29 January 1983	INC(I)	
Deputy Minister in the Ministry of Agriculture	Mohammed Usman Arif	15 January 1982	6 September 1982	INC(I)	
Deputy Minister in the Ministry of Agriculture	Arif Mohammad Khan	29 January 1983	7 February 1984	INC(I)	
Deputy Minister in the Ministry of Civil Supplies	Brajamohan Mohanty	19 October 1980	15 January 1982	INC(I)	
Deputy Minister in the Ministry of Civil Supplies	Mohammed Usman Arif	15 January 1982	14 February 1983	INC(I)	
Deputy Minister in the Ministry of Civil Supplies	M. S. Sanjeevi Rao	26 July 1983	31 October 1984	INC(I)	
Deputy Minister in the Ministry of Information and Broadcasting	Kumudben Joshi	19 October 1980	15 January 1982	INC(I)	
Deputy Minister in the Ministry of Information and Broadcasting	Arif Mohammad Khan	15 January 1982	29 January 1983	INC(I)	
Deputy Minister in the Ministry of Information and Broadcasting	Ghulam Nabi Azad	8 February 1984	31 October 1984	INC(I)	
Deputy Minister in the Ministry of Communications	Vijaykumar Naval Patil	19 October 1980	31 October 1984	INC(I)	
Deputy Minister in the Ministry of Labour	P. Venkata Reddy	19 October 1980	15 January 1982	INC(I)	
Deputy Minister in the Ministry of Labour	Dharam Vir	15 January 1982	6 September 1982	INC(I)	Renamed as Labour and Rehabilitation.
Deputy Minister in the Ministry of Labour and Rehabilitation	Dharam Vir	6 September 1982	29 January 1983	INC(I)	
Deputy Minister in the Ministry of Labour and Rehabilitation	Giridhar Gamang	6 September 1982	29 January 1983	INC(I)	
Deputy Minister in the Ministry of Rural Reconstruction	Kamla Kumari	24 November 1980	29 January 1983	INC(I)	
Deputy Minister in the Ministry of Education and Culture; Deputy Minister in the Department of Social Welfare	Mallikarjun Goud	21 November 1981	15 January 1982	INC(I)	
Deputy Minister in the Ministry of Education and Culture; Deputy Minister in the Department of Social Welfare	Prem Khandu Thungon	15 January 1982	31 October 1984	INC(I)	
Deputy Minister in the Department of Parliamentary Affairs	Mallikarjun Goud	15 January 1982	31 October 1984	INC(I)	
Deputy Minister in the Department of Parliamentary Affairs	Kalpnath Rai	15 January 1982	6 September 1982	INC(I)	
Deputy Minister in the Ministry of Commerce	P. A. Sangma	15 January 1982	31 October 1984	INC(I)	
Deputy Minister in the Ministry of Health and Family Welfare	Kumudben Joshi	15 January 1982	31 October 1984	INC(I)	
Deputy Minister in the Department of Electronics	M. S. Sanjeevi Rao	15 January 1982	31 October 1984	INC(I)	
Deputy Minister in the Ministry of Defence	Kamakhya Prasad Singh Deo	15 January 1982	29 January 1983	INC(I)	
Deputy Minister in the Ministry of Law, Justice and Company Affairs	Ghulam Nabi Azad	2 September 1982	8 February 1984	INC(I)	
Deputy Minister in the Ministry of Tourism	Ashok Gehlot	2 September 1982	14 February 1983	INC(I)	Merged with Ministry of Civil Aviation.
Deputy Minister in the Ministry of Tourism and Civil Aviation	Ashok Gehlot	14 February 1983	7 February 1984	INC(I)	
Deputy Minister in the Ministry of Sports	Mallikarjun Goud	15 January 1982	31 October 1984	INC(I)	
Deputy Minister in the Ministry of Sports	Ashok Gehlot	7 February 1984	31 October 1984	INC(I)	
Deputy Minister in the Department of Ecology	Digvijay Singh	2 September 1982	31 October 1984	INC(I)	

== See also ==
- List of Indian union ministries
