= First Rajiv Gandhi ministry =

Ministers in Government of India headed by Prime Minister Rajiv Gandhi (1984)

First Rajiv Gandhi Ministry
- 12th ministry of the Republic of India

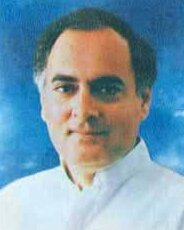
- Portrait of Rajiv Gandhi
- Date formed: 31 October 1984
- Date dissolved: 31 December 1984

People and organisations
- Head of state: Zail Singh
- Head of government: Rajiv Gandhi
- Member party: Indian National Congress (I) (Congress alliance)
- Status in legislature: Majority
- Opposition leader: Vacant

History
- Election: 1980
- Outgoing election: 1984
- Legislature term: 2 months
- Predecessor: Fourth Indira Gandhi ministry
- Successor: Second Rajiv Gandhi ministry

The First Rajiv Gandhi ministry was the 10th union council of ministers of India which was formed on 31 October 1984 after the assassination of prime minister Indira Gandhi. The ministry was headed by Rajiv Gandhi and retained most ministers from the predecessor cabinet.

The ministry was dissolved on 31 December 1984 after the 1984 general election.

== History ==
Rajiv Gandhi was appointed as the Prime Minister following the assassination of his mother and Prime Minister Indira Gandhi on 31 October 1984. He was sworn in as the Prime Minister by President Zail Singh the same day as the assassination of Indira Gandhi.

== Composition ==
Prime Minister Rajiv Gandhi retained the senior ministers from the predecessor cabinet headed by Indira Gandhi. Those sworn in as minister along with him on 31 October 1984 included P. V. Narasimha Rao, Pranab Mukherjee, Shankarrao Chavan, P. Shiv Shankar and Buta Singh as cabinet-rank ministers.

A cabinet expansion took place on 4 November 1984 when several other cabinet ministers, ministers of state and deputy ministers were sworn in into office.

=== Cabinet Ministers ===
Portfolio	Minister	Took office	Left office	Party
Prime Minister; Minister of External Affairs; Minister of Personnel, Public Grievances and Pensions; Minister of Science and Technology; Department of Atomic Energy; Department of Electronics; Department of Ocean Development; Department of Space; And also in-charge of all other important portfolios and policy issuesnot allocated to any Minister.	Rajiv Gandhi	31 October 1984	31 December 1984	INC(I)
Minister of Defence	Shankarrao Chavan	31 October 1984	31 December 1984	INC(I)
Minister of Home Affairs	P. V. Narasimha Rao	31 October 1984	31 December 1984	INC(I)
Minister of Planning	P. V. Narasimha Rao	4 November 1984	31 December 1984	INC(I)
Minister of Finance; Minister of Commerce and Supply	Pranab Mukherjee	31 October 1984	31 December 1984	INC(I)
Minister of Energy	P. Shiv Shankar	31 October 1984	31 December 1984	INC(I)
Minister of Parliamentary Affairs; Minister of Works and Housing; Minister of Sports	Buta Singh	31 October 1984	31 December 1984	INC(I)
Minister of Labour and Rehabilitation; Minister of Shipping and Transport	Veerendra Patil	4 November 1984	31 December 1984	INC(I)
Minister of Industry and Company Affairs	Kotla Vijaya Bhaskara Reddy	4 November 1984	31 December 1984	INC(I)
Minister of Law and Justice	Jagannath Kaushal	4 November 1984	31 December 1984	INC(I)
Minister of Agriculture	Rao Birender Singh	4 November 1984	31 December 1984	INC(I)
Minister of Railways	A. B. A. Ghani Khan Choudhury	4 November 1984	31 December 1984	INC(I)
Minister of Rural Development	Mohsina Kidwai	4 November 1984	31 December 1984	INC(I)
Minister of Health and Family Welfare	B. Shankaranand	4 November 1984	31 December 1984	INC(I)
Minister of Chemicals and Fertilizers	Vasant Sathe	4 November 1984	31 December 1984	INC(I)

=== Ministers of State (Independent Charge) ===
Portfolio	Minister	Took office	Left office	Party
Minister of State (Independent Charge) of Irrigation	C. K. Jaffer Sharief	4 November 1984	31 December 1984	INC(I)
Minister of State (Independent Charge) of Education, Culture and Social Welfare	Sheila Kaul	4 November 1984	31 December 1984	INC(I)
Minister of State (Independent Charge) of Steel and Mines	N. K. P. Salve	4 November 1984	31 December 1984	INC(I)
Minister of State (Independent Charge) of Civil Aviation and Tourism	Khurshid Alam Khan	4 November 1984	31 December 1984	INC(I)
Minister of State (Independent Charge) of Information and Broadcasting	H. K. L. Bhagat	4 November 1984	31 December 1984	INC(I)
Minister of State (Independent Charge) of Food and Civil Supplies	Bhagwat Jha Azad	4 November 1984	31 December 1984	INC(I)

=== Ministers of State ===
Portfolio	Minister	Took office	Left office	Party
Minister of State in the Ministry of External Affairs	Ram Niwas Mirdha	4 November 1984	31 December 1984	INC
Minister of State in the Ministry of External Affairs	A. A. Rahim	4 November 1984	31 December 1984	INC
Minister of State in the Ministry of Home Affairs	Ram Dulari Sinha	4 November 1984	31 December 1984	INC
Minister of State in the Ministry of Home Affairs	P. Venkatasubbaiah	4 November 1984	31 December 1984	INC
Minister of State in the Ministry of Defence	Kamakhya Prasad Singh Deo	4 November 1984	31 December 1984	INC
Minister of State in the Ministry of Commerce	S. M. Krishna	4 November 1984	31 December 1984	INC
Minister of State in the Ministry of Industry	S. B. P. Pattabhirama Rao	4 November 1984	31 December 1984	INC
Minister of State in the Ministry of Industry	Nihar Ranjan Laskar	12 November 1984	31 December 1984	INC
Minister of State in the Ministry of Communications	V. N. Gadgil	4 November 1984	31 December 1984	INC
Minister of State in the Ministry of Shipping and Transport	Ziaur Rahman Ansari	4 November 1984	31 December 1984	INC
Minister of State in the Ministry of Agriculture	Yogendra Makwana	4 November 1984	31 December 1984	INC
Minister of State in the Ministry of Planning	Harinath Misra	4 November 1984	31 December 1984	INC
Minister of State in the Ministry of Energy	Chaudhary Dalbir Singh (Coal)	4 November 1984	31 December 1984	INC
Minister of State in the Ministry of Energy	Gargi Shankar Mishra (Petroleum)	4 November 1984	31 December 1984	INC
Minister of State in the Ministry of Energy	Arif Mohammad Khan	12 November 1984	31 December 1984	INC
Minister of State in the Department of Science and Technology; Minister of State in the Department of Space; Minister of State in the Department of Atomic Energy; Minister of State in the Department of Electronics; Minister of State in the Department of Ocean Development	Shivraj Patil	4 November 1984	31 December 1984	INC
Minister of State in the Department of Parliamentary Affairs	N. K. P. Salve	4 November 1984	31 December 1984	INC
Minister of State in the Department of Parliamentary Affairs	H. K. L. Bhagat	4 November 1984	31 December 1984	INC
Minister of State in the Ministry of Labour and Rehabilitation	Dharam Vir	4 November 1984	22 December 1984	INC
Minister of State in the Ministry of Finance	Nawal Kishore Sharma	12 November 1984	31 December 1984	INC

=== Deputy Ministers ===
Portfolio	Minister	Took office	Left office	Party
Deputy Minister in the Ministry of Finance	Janardhana Poojary (Banking and Insurance)	31 October 1984	31 December 1984	INC
Deputy Minister in the Ministry of Commerce	P. A. Sangma	4 November 1984	31 December 1984	INC
Deputy Minister in the Department of Environment	Digvijay Singh	4 November 1984	31 December 1984	INC
Deputy Minister in the Ministries of Education, Culture and Social Welfare	Prem Khandu Thungan	4 November 1984	31 December 1984	INC
Deputy Minister in the Ministry of Works and Housing	Mallikarjun Goud	4 November 1984	31 December 1984	INC
Deputy Minister in the Ministry of Works and Housing	Mohammed Usman Arif	4 November 1984	31 December 1984	INC
Deputy Minister in the Ministry of Sports	Mallikarjun Goud	4 November 1984	31 December 1984	INC
Deputy Minister in the Ministry of Sports	Ashok Gehlot	12 November 1984	31 December 1984	INC
Deputy Minister in the Department of Parliamentary Affairs	Mallikarjun Goud	4 November 1984	31 December 1984	INC
Deputy Minister in the Ministry of Health and Family Welfare	Kumudben Joshi	4 November 1984	31 December 1984	INC
Deputy Minister in the Ministry of Communications	Vijaykumar Naval Patil	4 November 1984	31 December 1984	INC
Deputy Minister in the Department of Electronics	M. S. Sanjeevi Rao	4 November 1984	31 December 1984	INC
