= Minister of Housing and Urban Affairs =

Indian government minister

- आवासन एवं शहरी कार्य मंत्री Āvāsan Ēvaṁ Śahrī Kārya Mantrī
- Emblem of India

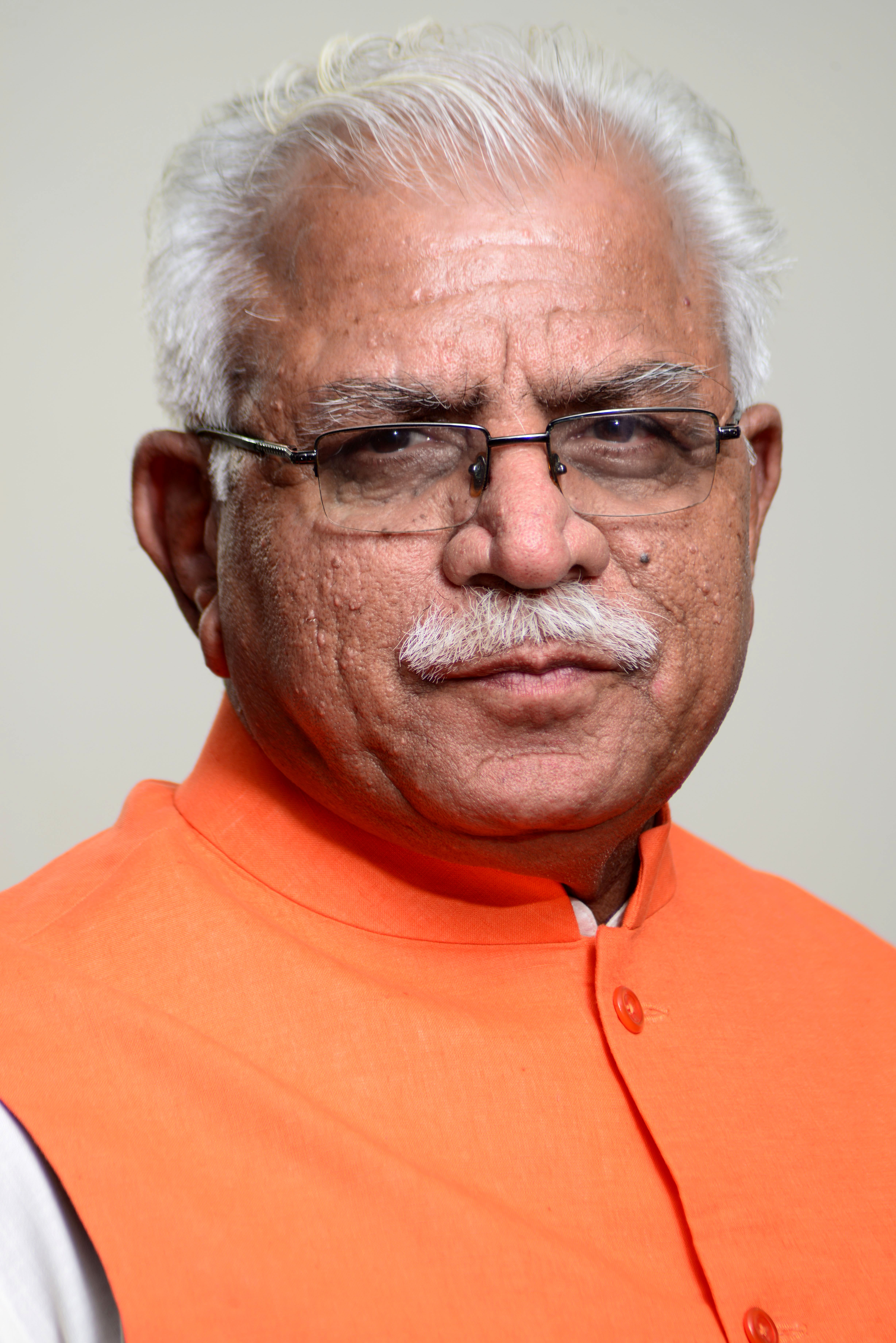
- Incumbent; Manohar Lal Khattar since 10 June 2024
- Ministry of Housing and Urban Affairs
- Member of: Cabinet of India
- Reports to: President of India; Prime Minister of India; Parliament of India
- Appointer: President of India on the recommendation of the Prime Minister of India
- Formation: 15 August 1947 (as Ministry of Works, Mines and Power); 6 July 2017 (current form)
- First holder: Narhar Vishnu Gadgil (as Minister of Works, Mines and Power); M. Venkaiah Naidu (as Minister of Housing and Urban Affairs)
- Deputy: Tokhan Sahu

The minister of housing and urban affairs is the head of the Ministry of Housing and Urban Affairs of the Government of India since the ministry's formation on 6 July 2017 and is a member of the union council of ministers. The minister is responsible for the execution, formulation and administration of the rules and regulations and laws relating to the housing and urban development in India.

The ministry is currently headed by Manohar Lal Khattar who has been the minister since 10 June 2024. Khattar is the Member of Parliament for Karnal and was formerly the 10th chief minister of Haryana, from 2014 to 2024. Khattar also jointly holds the post of minister of power. The cabinet minister is often assisted by a minister of state and formerly by a deputy minister.

== History of office ==
The ministry came into existence on 15 August 1947 soon after the independence as the "Ministry of Works, Mines and Power". Narhar Vishnu Gadgil was appointed as the first minister of works, mines and power thereupon. On 26 December 1950, the ministry was reorganized and recognized as the minister of works, production and supply. In 1952, the ministry was renamed as the "Ministry of Works, Housing and Supply" after the Department of Production was separated and the Ministry of Production was formed. Swaran Singh was appointed as the inaugural minister of works, housing and supply and served from 1952 until 1957. In 1962, the Department of Supply was separated from the ministry and the Ministry of Rehabilitation was merged with the Ministry of Works and Supply to form the "Ministry of Works, Housing and Rehabilitation".

In 1964, the ministry was renamed as "Ministry of Works and Housing" after the Department of Rehabilitation was separated from it and further renamed in 1966 as "Ministry of Works, Housing and Urban Development" and in 1971 as "Ministry of Works and Housing". In 1977, the ministry was merged with Ministry of Supply and Rehabilitation to form the "Ministry of Works, Housing, Supply and Rehabilitation". In 1980, the ministry was renamed back as "Ministry of Works and Housing".

In 1985, with rapidly growing urban issues and to give more importance to those issues, the ministry was renamed as the "Ministry of Urban Development" and further renamed in 1995 as the "Ministry of Urban Affairs and Employment" with two constituent departments, namely, the Department of Urban Employment and Poverty Alleviation and the Department of Urban Employment.

The two departments were merged together in 1999 as the "Ministry of Urban Development" and bifurcated only months later into the "Ministry of Urban Development" and the "Urban Employment and Poverty Alleviation". The two independent ministries were re-united on 27 May 2000 as the "Ministry of Urban Development and Poverty Alleviation" with Jagmohan serving as the first office-holder.

Upon the formation of the First Manmohan Singh ministry on 22 May 2004, the ministry was again bifurcated. Two separate ministries were formed, one concerned with urban development and was named as "Ministry of Urban Development" and Ghulam Nabi Azad was appointed as the minister of urban development, while the other ministry was concerned with urban employment and poverty issues and was named as "Ministry of Urban Employment and Poverty Alleviation" and Kumari Selja was appointed as the minister. The Ministry of Urban Employment and Poverty Alleviation was renamed as the "Ministry of Housing and Urban Poverty Alleviation" in 2006 and existed until 2017.

On 6 July 2017, the two independent ministries were re-united as the "Ministry of Housing and Urban Affairs" and has since existed in this form. Venkaiah Naidu who served as the minister in both the ministries prior to their merger was appointed as the first minister thereupon. He resigned the following month after being nominated as a candidate for the 2017 vice presidential election and was elected as the Vice President in August 2017. Upon his resignation, Rural Development minister Narendra Singh Tomar briefly officiated in the ministry until the appointment of Hardeep Singh Puri in September 2017. Puri has since then served as the minister of housing and urban affairs and is the longest serving minister in the ministry.

== Titles of office ==
The Ministry of Housing and Urban Affairs has undergone several minor and major organizational and nominal changes since its establishment as the "Ministry of Works, Housing and Supply" in 1952.

- 1947–1950: Minister of Works, Mines and Power
- 1950–1952: Minister of Works, Production and Supply
- 1952–1962: Minister of Works, Housing and Supply
- 1962–1964: Minister of Works, Housing and Rehabilitation
- 1964–1966: Minister of Works and Housing
- 1966–1971: Minister of Works, Housing and Urban Development
- 1971–1977: Minister of Works and Housing
- 1977–1980: Minister of Works, Housing, Supply and Rehabilitation
- 1980–1985: Minister of Works and Housing
- 1985–1995: Minister of Urban Development
- 1995–1999: Minister of Urban Affairs and Employment
- 1999–2000: Minister of Urban Development
- 2000–2004: Minister of Urban Development and Poverty Alleviation
- 2004–2017: Minister of Urban Development
- 2017–present: Minister of Housing and Urban Affairs

== Cabinet ministers ==
- Key: ^{†} Died in office

Portrait	Minister (Birth-Death) Constituency	Term of office			Political party	Ministry	Prime Minister
Portrait	Minister (Birth-Death) Constituency	From	To	Period	Political party	Ministry	Prime Minister
=== Minister of Works, Mines and Power (1947–1950) ===
	Narhar Vishnu Gadgil (1896–1966); MCA for Bombay	15 August 1947	26 December 1950	3 years, 133 days	Indian National Congress	Nehru I	Jawaharlal Nehru
=== Minister of Works, Production and Supply (1950–1952) ===
	Narhar Vishnu Gadgil (1896–1966); MCA for Bombay	26 December 1950	13 May 1952	3 years, 133 days	Indian National Congress	Nehru I	Jawaharlal Nehru
=== Minister of Works, Housing and Supply (1952–1962) ===
	Swaran Singh (1907–1994); Rajya Sabha MP for Punjab	13 May 1952	17 April 1957	4 years, 339 days	Indian National Congress	Nehru II	Jawaharlal Nehru
	K. Chengalaraya Reddy (1902–1976); MP for Kolar	17 April 1957	5 April 1961	3 years, 353 days	Indian National Congress	Nehru III	Jawaharlal Nehru
	Bezawada Gopala Reddy (1907–1997); MP for Kavali (Minister of State)	5 April 1961	10 April 1962	1 year, 5 days	Indian National Congress	Nehru III	Jawaharlal Nehru
	Mehr Chand Khanna (1897–1970); MP for New Delhi (Minister of State)	10 April 1962	15 November 1962	219 days	Indian National Congress	Nehru IV	Jawaharlal Nehru
=== Minister of Works, Housing and Rehabilitation (1962–1964) ===
	Mehr Chand Khanna (1897–1970); MP for New Delhi (Minister of State)	15 November 1962	16 April 1964	1 year, 153 days	Indian National Congress	Nehru IV	Jawaharlal Nehru
=== Minister of Works and Housing (1964–1966) ===
	Mehr Chand Khanna (1897–1970); MP for New Delhi (Minister of State)	16 April 1964	27 May 1964	1 year, 283 days	Indian National Congress	Nehru IV	Jawaharlal Nehru
	Mehr Chand Khanna (1897–1970); MP for New Delhi (Minister of State)	27 May 1964	9 June 1964	1 year, 283 days	Indian National Congress	Nanda I	Gulzarilal Nanda (Acting)
	Mehr Chand Khanna (1897–1970); MP for New Delhi (Minister of State)	9 June 1964	11 January 1966	1 year, 283 days	Indian National Congress	Shastri	Lal Bahadur Shastri
	Mehr Chand Khanna (1897–1970); MP for New Delhi (Minister of State)	11 January 1966	24 January 1966	1 year, 283 days	Indian National Congress	Nanda II	Gulzarilal Nanda (Acting)
=== Minister of Works, Housing and Urban Development (1966–1971) ===
	Mehr Chand Khanna (1897–1970); MP for New Delhi (Minister of State)	24 January 1966	13 March 1967	1 year, 48 days	Indian National Congress	Indira I	Indira Gandhi
	Jagannath Rao (1909–?); MP for Chatrapur (Minister of State)	13 March 1967	14 November 1967	246 days	Indian National Congress	Indira II	Indira Gandhi
	Satya Narayan Sinha (1900–1983); MP for Darbhanga	14 November 1967	14 February 1969	1 year, 92 days	Indian National Congress	Indira II	Indira Gandhi
	Kodardas Kalidas Shah (1908–1986); Rajya Sabha MP for Gujarat	14 February 1969	18 March 1971	2 years, 32 days	Indian National Congress (R)	Indira II	Indira Gandhi
=== Minister of Works and Housing (1971–1977) ===
	Inder Kumar Gujral (1919–2012); Rajya Sabha MP for Punjab (Minister of State)	18 March 1971	2 May 1971	45 days	Indian National Congress (R)	Indira III	Indira Gandhi
	Uma Shankar Dikshit (1901–1991); Rajya Sabha MP for Uttar Pradesh	2 May 1971	5 February 1973	1 year, 279 days	Indian National Congress (R)	Indira III	Indira Gandhi
	Bhola Paswan Shastri (1914–1984); Rajya Sabha MP for Bihar	5 February 1973	10 October 1974	1 year, 247 days	Indian National Congress (R)	Indira III	Indira Gandhi
	Kotha Raghuramaiah (1912–1979); MP for Guntur	10 October 1974	23 December 1976	2 years, 74 days	Indian National Congress (R)	Indira III	Indira Gandhi
	Hitendra Kanaiyalal Desai (1915–1993); Unelected	23 December 1976	24 March 1977	91 days	Indian National Congress (R)	Indira III	Indira Gandhi
=== Minister of Works, Housing, Supply and Rehabilitation (1977–1980) ===
	Sikander Bakht (1918–2004); MP for Chandni Chowk	24 March 1977	28 July 1979	2 years, 126 days	Janata Party	Desai	Morarji Desai
	Ram Kinkar (1922–2003); MP for Barabanki	28 July 1979	14 January 1980	170 days	Janata Party (Secular)	Charan	Charan Singh
=== Minister of Works and Housing (1980–1985) ===
	Prakash Chandra Sethi (1919–1996); MP for Indore	14 January 1980	19 October 1980	279 days	Indian National Congress (I)	Indira IV	Indira Gandhi
	Bhishma Narain Singh (1933–2018); Rajya Sabha MP for Bihar	19 October 1980	29 January 1983	2 years, 102 days	Indian National Congress (I)	Indira IV	Indira Gandhi
	Buta Singh (1934–2021); MP for Ropar	29 January 1983	31 October 1984	1 year, 332 days	Indian National Congress (I)	Indira IV	Indira Gandhi
	Buta Singh (1934–2021); MP for Ropar	4 November 1984	31 December 1984	1 year, 332 days	Indian National Congress (I)	Rajiv I	Rajiv Gandhi
	Abdul Ghafoor (1918–2004); MP for Siwan	31 December 1984	25 September 1985	268 days	Indian National Congress (I)	Rajiv II	Rajiv Gandhi
=== Minister of Urban Development (1985–1995) ===
	Abdul Ghafoor (1918–2004); MP for Siwan	25 September 1985	22 October 1986	1 year, 27 days	Indian National Congress	Rajiv II	Rajiv Gandhi
	Mohsina Kidwai (1932–2026); MP for Meerut	22 October 1986	2 December 1989	3 years, 41 days	Indian National Congress	Rajiv II	Rajiv Gandhi
	Murasoli Maran (1934–2003); MP for Chennai South	2 December 1989	10 November 1990	343 days	Dravida Munnetra Kazhagam	Vishwanath	V. P. Singh
	Daulat Ram Saran (1924–2011); MP for Churu	21 November 1990	21 June 1991	212 days	Samajwadi Janata Party (Rashtriya)	Chandra Shekhar	Chandra Shekhar
	Sheila Kaul (1915–2015); MP for Raebareli	21 June 1991	3 May 1995	3 years, 316 days	Indian National Congress (I)	Rao	P. V. Narasimha Rao
=== Minister of Urban Affairs and Employment (1995–1999) ===
	Sheila Kaul (1915–2015); MP for Raebareli	3 May 1995	10 September 1995	130 days	Indian National Congress (I)	Rao	P. V. Narasimha Rao
	P. V. Narasimha Rao (1921–2004); MP for Nandyal (Prime Minister)	10 September 1995	15 September 1995	5 days	Indian National Congress (I)	Rao	P. V. Narasimha Rao
	R. K. Dhawan (1937–2018); Rajya Sabha MP for Bihar (Minister of State, I/C)	15 September 1995	21 February 1996	159 days	Indian National Congress (I)	Rao	P. V. Narasimha Rao
	P. V. Narasimha Rao (1921–2004); MP for Nandyal (Prime Minister)	21 February 1996	16 May 1996	85 days	Indian National Congress (I)	Rao	P. V. Narasimha Rao
	Sikander Bakht (1918–2004); Rajya Sabha MP for Madhya Pradesh	16 May 1996	1 June 1996	16 days	Bharatiya Janata Party	Vajpayee I	Atal Bihari Vajpayee
	M. Arunachalam (1944–2004); MP for Tenkasi	1 June 1996	29 June 1996	28 days	Tamil Maanila Congress (Moopanar)	Deve Gowda	H. D. Deve Gowda
	H. D. Deve Gowda (born 1933); Rajya Sabha MP for Karnataka (Prime Minister)	29 June 1996	21 April 1997	296 days	Janata Dal	Deve Gowda	H. D. Deve Gowda
	Inder Kumar Gujral (1919–2012); Rajya Sabha MP for Bihar (Prime Minister)	21 April 1997	9 June 1997	49 days	Janata Dal	Gujral	Inder Kumar Gujral
	M. P. Veerendra Kumar (1936–2020); MP for Kozhikode (Minister of State, I/C)	9 June 1997	2 July 1997	23 days	Janata Dal	Gujral	Inder Kumar Gujral
	Ummareddy Venkateswarlu (born 1935); MP for Bapatla (Minister of State, I/C)	2 July 1997	14 November 1997	135 days	Telugu Desam Party	Gujral	Inder Kumar Gujral
	T. G. Venkatraman (1931–2013); MP for Tindivanam	14 November 1997	12 December 1997	28 days	Dravida Munnetra Kazhagam	Gujral	Inder Kumar Gujral
	Ummareddy Venkateswarlu (born 1935); MP for Bapatla (Minister of State, I/C)	12 December 1997	19 March 1998	97 days	Telugu Desam Party	Gujral	Inder Kumar Gujral
	Ram Jethmalani (1923–2019); Rajya Sabha MP for Maharashtra	19 March 1998	8 June 1999	1 year, 81 days	Independent	Vajpayee II	Atal Bihari Vajpayee
=== Minister of Urban Development (1999) ===
	Jagmohan (1927–2021); MP for New Delhi	8 June 1999	13 October 1999	167 days	Bharatiya Janata Party	Vajpayee II	Bharatiya Janata Party
	Jagmohan (1927–2021); MP for New Delhi	13 October 1999	22 November 1999	167 days	Bharatiya Janata Party	Vajpayee III	Bharatiya Janata Party
=== Minister of Urban Development and Poverty Alleviation (1999) ===
	Jagmohan (1927–2021); MP for New Delhi	22 November 1999	26 November 1999	4 days	Bharatiya Janata Party	Vajpayee III	Atal Bihari Vajpayee
=== Minister of Urban Development (1999–2000) ===
	Jagmohan (1927–2021); MP for New Delhi	26 November 1999	27 May 2000	183 days	Bharatiya Janata Party	Vajpayee III	Atal Bihari Vajpayee
=== Minister of Urban Development and Poverty Alleviation (2000–2004) ===
	Jagmohan (1927–2021); MP for New Delhi	27 May 2000	1 September 2001	1 year, 97 days	Bharatiya Janata Party	Vajpayee III	Atal Bihari Vajpayee
	Ananth Kumar (1959–2018); MP for Bangalore South	1 September 2001	12 July 2003	1 year, 314 days	Bharatiya Janata Party	Vajpayee III	Atal Bihari Vajpayee
	Major General (Retd.); B. C. Khanduri; AVSM (born 1934); MP for Garhwal	12 July 2003	8 September 2003	58 days	Bharatiya Janata Party	Vajpayee III	Atal Bihari Vajpayee
	Bandaru Dattatreya (born 1947); MP for Secunderabad (Minister of State, I/C)	8 September 2003	22 May 2004	257 days	Bharatiya Janata Party	Vajpayee III	Atal Bihari Vajpayee
=== Minister of Urban Development (2004–2017) ===
	Ghulam Nabi Azad (born 1949); Rajya Sabha MP for Jammu and Kashmir	23 May 2004	1 November 2005	1 year, 162 days	Indian National Congress	Manmohan I	Manmohan Singh
	Manmohan Singh (born 1932); Rajya Sabha MP for Assam (Prime Minister)	1 November 2005	18 November 2005	17 days	Indian National Congress	Manmohan I	Manmohan Singh
	S. Jaipal Reddy (1942–2019); MP for Miryalguda (until 2009); MP for Chevella (from 2009)	18 November 2005	22 May 2009	3 years, 185 days	Indian National Congress	Manmohan I	Manmohan Singh
	S. Jaipal Reddy (1942–2019); MP for Miryalguda (until 2009); MP for Chevella (from 2009)	28 May 2009	19 January 2011	1 year, 236 days	Indian National Congress	Manmohan II	Manmohan Singh
	Kamal Nath (born 1946); MP for Chhindwara	19 January 2011	26 May 2014	3 years, 127 days	Indian National Congress	Manmohan II	Manmohan Singh
	M. Venkaiah Naidu (born 1948); Rajya Sabha MP for Karnataka, till 2016; Rajya Sabha MP for Rajasthan, from 2016	27 May 2014	6 July 2017	3 years, 40 days	Bharatiya Janata Party	Modi I	Narendra Modi
=== Minister of Housing and Urban Affairs (2017–present) ===
	M. Venkaiah Naidu (born 1948); Rajya Sabha MP for Rajasthan	6 July 2017	17 July 2017	11 days'	Bharatiya Janata Party	Modi I	Narendra Modi
	Narendra Singh Tomar (born 1957); MP for Gwalior	18 July 2017	3 September 2017	47 days	Bharatiya Janata Party	Modi I	Narendra Modi
	Hardeep Singh Puri (born 1952); Rajya Sabha MP for Uttar Pradesh (Minister of State, I/C until 7 July 2021)	3 September 2017	30 May 2019	6 years, 280 days	Bharatiya Janata Party	Modi I	Narendra Modi
	Hardeep Singh Puri (born 1952); Rajya Sabha MP for Uttar Pradesh (Minister of State, I/C until 7 July 2021)	31 May 2019	9 June 2024	6 years, 280 days	Bharatiya Janata Party	Modi II	Narendra Modi
	Manohar Lal Khattar (born 1954); MP for Karnal	9 June 2024	Incumbent	2 years, 90 days	Bharatiya Janata Party	Modi III	Narendra Modi

== Ministers of state ==
No.	Portrait	Minister (Birth-Death) Constituency	Term of office			Political party	Ministry	Prime Minister
No.	Portrait	Minister (Birth-Death) Constituency	From	To	Period	Political party	Ministry	Prime Minister
Minister of State for Works, Housing and Urban Development
1		Jagannath Rao (1909–?); MP for Chatrapur	13 March 1967	14 February 1969	1 year, 338 days	Indian National Congress	Indira II	Indira Gandhi
2		Sripati Chandrasekhar (1918–2001); MP for Tamil Nadu	14 November 1967	26 June 1970	2 years, 224 days	Indian National Congress	Indira II	Indira Gandhi
3		Bayya Suryanarayana Murthy (1906–1979); MP for Kakinada	18 February 1969	13 March 1971	2 years, 23 days	Indian National Congress (R)	Indira II	Indira Gandhi
4		Parimal Ghosh (1917–1985); MP for Ghatal	26 June 1970	18 March 1971	265 days	Indian National Congress (R)	Indira II	Indira Gandhi
5		Inder Kumar Gujral (1919–2012); Rajya Sabha MP for Punjab	18 March 1971	2 May 1971	45 days	Indian National Congress (R)	Indira III	Indira Gandhi
Minister of State for Works and Housing
(5)		Inder Kumar Gujral (1919–2012); Rajya Sabha MP for Punjab	2 May 1971	22 July 1972	1 year, 81 days	Indian National Congress (R)	Indira III	Indira Gandhi
6		D. P. Chattopadhyaya (1933–2022); Rajya Sabha MP for West Bengal	2 August 1972	5 February 1973	187 days	Indian National Congress (R)	Indira III	Indira Gandhi
7		Om Mehta (1927–1995); Rajya Sabha MP for Jammu and Kashmir	5 February 1973	10 October 1974	1 year, 247 days	Indian National Congress (R)	Indira III	Indira Gandhi
8		Mohan Dharia (1925–2013); MP for Pune	10 October 1974	2 March 1975	143 days	Indian National Congress (R)	Indira III	Indira Gandhi
9		H. K. L. Bhagat (1921–2005); MP for East Delhi	1 December 1975	24 March 1977	1 year, 113 days	Indian National Congress (R)	Indira III	Indira Gandhi
Minister of State for Works, Housing, Supply and Rehabilitation
10		Ram Kinkar (1922–2003); MP for Barabanki	14 August 1977	11 July 1978	331 days	Janata Party	Desai	Morarji Desai
10		Ram Kinkar (1922–2003); MP for Barabanki	26 January 1979	15 July 1979	170 days	Janata Party	Desai	Morarji Desai
Minister of State for Works and Housing
(9)		H. K. L. Bhagat (1921–2005); MP for East Delhi	2 September 1982	14 February 1983	165 days	Indian National Congress (I)	Indira IV	Indira Gandhi
Minister of State for Urban Development
11		Dalbir Singh; MP for Shahdol	25 September 1985	2 December 1989	4 years, 68 days	Indian National Congress (I)	Rajiv II	Rajiv Gandhi
12		M. Arunachalam (1944–2004); MP for Tenkasi	21 June 1991	18 January 1993	1 year, 211 days	Indian National Congress (I)	Rao	P. V. Narasimha Rao
13		Prem Khandu Thungan (born 1946); MP for Arunachal West	18 January 1993	13 September 1995	2 years, 238 days	Indian National Congress (I)	Rao	P. V. Narasimha Rao
Minister of State for Urban Affairs and Employment
14		S. S. Ahluwalia (born 1951); Rajya Sabha MP for Bihar (Urban Employment and Poverty Alleviation)	15 September 1995	8 March 1996	244 days	Indian National Congress (I)	Rao	P. V. Narasimha Rao
(14)		S. S. Ahluwalia (born 1951); Rajya Sabha MP for Bihar	8 March 1996	16 May 1996	244 days	Indian National Congress (I)	Rao	P. V. Narasimha Rao
15		Ummareddy Venkateswarlu (born 1935); MP for Bapatla	29 June 1996	21 April 1997	345 days	Telugu Desam Party	Deve Gowda	H. D. Deve Gowda
15		Ummareddy Venkateswarlu (born 1935); MP for Bapatla	21 April 1997	9 June 1997	345 days	Telugu Desam Party	Gujral	Inder Kumar Gujral
16		M. P. Veerendra Kumar (1936–2020); MP for Kozhikode	26 May 1997	2 July 1997	37 days	Inder Kumar Gujral	Gujral	Inder Kumar Gujral
17		Bandaru Dattatreya (born 1947); MP for Secunderabad	20 March 1998	13 October 1999	1 year, 207 days	Bharatiya Janata Party	Vajpayee II	Atal Bihari Vajpayee
Minister of State for Urban Development
(17)		Bandaru Dattatreya (born 1947); MP for Secunderabad	13 October 1999	27 May 2000	227 days	Bharatiya Janata Party	Vajpayee III	Atal Bihari Vajpayee
Minister of State for Urban Development and Poverty Alleviation
(17)		Bandaru Dattatreya (born 1947); MP for Secunderabad	27 May 2000	1 July 2002	2 years, 35 days	Bharatiya Janata Party	Vajpayee III	Atal Bihari Vajpayee
18		O. Rajagopal (born 1929); Rajya Sabha MP for Madhya Pradesh	1 July 2002	29 January 2003	212 days	Bharatiya Janata Party	Vajpayee III	Atal Bihari Vajpayee
19		Pon Radhakrishnan (born 1952); MP for Kanniyakumari	29 January 2003	8 September 2003	222 days	Bharatiya Janata Party	Vajpayee III	Atal Bihari Vajpayee
Minister of State for Urban Development
20		Ajay Maken (born 1964); MP for New Delhi	29 January 2006	22 May 2009	3 years, 113 days	Indian National Congress	Manmohan I	Manmohan Singh
21		Saugata Roy (born 1946); MP for Dum Dum	29 May 2009	22 September 2012	3 years, 116 days	All India Trinamool Congress	Manmohan II	Manmohan Singh
22		Deepa Dasmunsi (born 1960); MP for Raiganj	28 October 2012	26 May 2014	1 year, 210 days	Indian National Congress	Manmohan II	Manmohan Singh
23		Babul Supriyo (born 1970); MP for Asansol	9 November 2014	12 July 2016	1 year, 246 days	Bharatiya Janata Party	Modi I	Narendra Modi
24		Rao Inderjit Singh (born 1951); MP for Gurgaon	5 July 2016	6 July 2017	1 year, 1 day	Bharatiya Janata Party	Modi I	Narendra Modi
Minister of State for Housing and Urban Affairs
25		Rao Inderjit Singh (born 1951); MP for Gurgaon	6 July 2017	3 September 2017	59 days	Bharatiya Janata Party	Modi I	Narendra Modi
26		Kaushal Kishore (born 1960); MP for Mohanlalganj	7 July 2021	11 June 2024	5 years, 63 days	Bharatiya Janata Party	Modi II	Narendra Modi
26		Tokhan Sahu (born 1969); MP for Bilaspur	11 June 2024	Incumbent	2 years, 89 days	Bharatiya Janata Party	Modi III	Narendra Modi

== Deputy ministers ==
No.	Portrait	Minister (Birth-Death) Constituency	Term of office			Political party	Ministry	Prime Minister
No.	Portrait	Minister (Birth-Death) Constituency	From	To	Period	Political party	Ministry	Prime Minister
Deputy Minister of Works, Mines and Power
1		Surendranath Buragohain	14 August 1950	26 December 1950	134 days	Indian National Congress	Nehru I	Jawaharlal Nehru
Deputy Minister of Works, Production and Supply
(1)		Surendranath Buragohain	26 December 1950	13 May 1952	1 year, 139 days	Indian National Congress	Nehru I	Jawaharlal Nehru
Deputy Minister of Works, Housing and Supply
(1)		Surendranath Buragohain; MP for Sibsagar North Lakhimpur	13 May 1952	4 October 1953	1 year, 144 days	Indian National Congress	Nehru II	Jawaharlal Nehru
2		Anil Kumar Chanda (1906–1976); MP for Birbhum	1 May 1957	10 April 1962	4 years, 344 days	Indian National Congress	Nehru III	Jawaharlal Nehru
3		Purnendu Sekhar Naskar (1921–?); MP for Mathurapur	16 April 1962	5 December 1962	233 days	Indian National Congress	Nehru IV	Jawaharlal Nehru
4		Jagannath Rao (1909–?); MP for Chatrapur	8 May 1962	26 November 1962	202 days	Indian National Congress	Nehru IV	Jawaharlal Nehru
Deputy Minister of Works, Housing and Rehabilitation
(3)		Purnendu Sekhar Naskar (1921–?); MP for Mathurapur	5 December 1962	16 April 1964	1 year, 133 days	Indian National Congress	Nehru IV	Jawaharlal Nehru
Deputy Minister of Works, Housing and Urban Development
5		B. C. Bhagawati; Rajya Sabha MP for Assam	24 January 1966	13 March 1967	1 year, 48 days	Indian National Congress	Indira I	Indira Gandhi
6		Iqbal Singh (1923–1988); MP for Fazilka	18 March 1967	14 February 1969	1 year, 333 days	Indian National Congress	Indira II	Indira Gandhi
7		Bayya Suryanarayana Murthy (1906–1979); MP for Kakinada	14 November 1967	18 February 1969	1 year, 96 days	Indian National Congress	Indira II	Indira Gandhi
Deputy Minister of Works and Housing
8		Chaudhary Dalbir Singh (1926–1987); MP for Sirsa	10 October 1974	1 December 1975	1 year, 52 days	Indian National Congress (R)	Indira III	Indira Gandhi
9		Mohammed Usman Arif (1923–1995); Rajya Sabha MP for Rajasthan	8 June 1980	15 January 1982	1 year, 221 days	Indian National Congress (I)	Indira IV	Indira Gandhi
10		Brajamohan Mohanty (1924–1999); MP for Puri	15 January 1982	29 January 1983	1 year, 14 days	Indian National Congress (I)	Indira IV	Indira Gandhi
11		Mallikarjun Goud (1941–2002); MP for Mahabubnagar	15 January 1982	31 October 1984	2 years, 290 days	Indian National Congress (I)	Indira IV	Indira Gandhi
(9)		Mohammed Usman Arif (1923–1995); Rajya Sabha MP for Rajasthan	14 February 1983	31 October 1984	1 year, 260 days	Indian National Congress (I)	Indira IV	Indira Gandhi
(11)		Mallikarjun Goud (1941–2002); MP for Mahabubnagar	4 November 1984	31 December 1984	57 days	Indian National Congress (I)	Rajiv I	Rajiv Gandhi
(9)		Mohammed Usman Arif (1923–1995); Rajya Sabha MP for Rajasthan	4 November 1984	31 December 1984	57 days	Indian National Congress (I)	Rajiv I	Rajiv Gandhi
