= Minister of Agriculture and Farmers' Welfare =

Indian cabinet office

- कृषि एवं किसान कल्याण मंत्री Kr̥ṣi Evaṁ Kisān Kalyāṇ Mantrī
- Logo of The Ministry of Agriculture and Farmers' Welfare

- Flag of The Republic of India

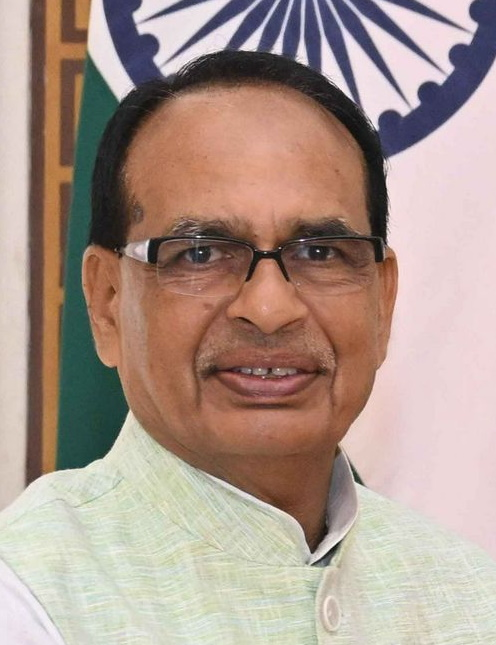
- Incumbent; Shivraj Singh Chauhan since 11 June 2024
- Ministry of Agriculture and Farmers' Welfare
- Member of: Cabinet of India
- Reports to: President of India; Prime Minister of India; Parliament of India
- Appointer: President of India; on the recommendation of the Prime Minister of India
- Formation: 2015
- First holder: Rajendra Prasad (as Minister of Food and Agriculture)

The minister of agriculture and farmers' welfare (Hindi: कृषि एवं किसान कल्याण मंत्री) is the head of the Ministry of Agriculture and Farmers' Welfare and a key member of the union council of ministers of the Government of India. The portfolio is usually held by a minister with cabinet rank who is a senior member of the council of ministers and is often assisted by one or two junior ministers or the ministers of state for agriculture and farmers' welfare and previously by a further junior minister of the deputy minister of agriculture.

The current minister of agriculture and farmers' welfare is Shivraj Singh Chouhan who is holding the charge of the ministry since 10 June 2024 and is assisted by two ministers of state - Ram Nath Thakur and Bhagirath Choudhary since 10 June 2024.

== History ==
The ministry was established on 15 August 1947 as the "Ministry of Food and Agriculture". Rajendra Prasad, who later became the President of India served as the inaugural minister of the ministry and served until his resignation on 14 January 1948. The ministry was renamed as the "Ministry of Food, Agriculture, Community Development and Cooperation" on 24 January 1966 under prime minister Indira Gandhi and further renamed in 1971 as the "Ministry of Agriculture".

In 1974, the Ministry of Irrigation was merged with the Ministry of Agriculture and renamed as the "Ministry of Agriculture and Irrigation". In 1980, the Department of Irrigation was separated and the "Ministry of Agriculture" was reformed. On 27 August 2015, the ministry was renamed as the "Ministry of Agriculture and Farmers' Welfare". In 2021, prime minister Narendra Modi announced that the Ministry of Co-operation has been carved out of from the Ministry of Agriculture and Farmers' Welfare.

== Trivia ==
- Two future presidents had served as the ministers of agriculture, namely Rajendra Prasad (1947–1948) and Fakhruddin Ali Ahmed (1970–1974).
- Four prime ministers held the portfolio of Agriculture during their premiership, namely V. P. Singh (in 1990), P. V. Narasimha Rao (in 1996), H. D. Deve Gowda (in 1996) and Atal Bihari Vajpayee (twice, in 1998–1999 and in 2000).
- Sharad Pawar holds the record of being the longest-serving minister of agriculture with a tenure of 10 years, 3 days in office.

== Titles ==
- 1947–1951: Minister of Agriculture
- 1951–1966: Minister of Food and Agriculture
- 1966–1971: Minister of Food, Agriculture, Community Development and Cooperation
- 1971–1974: Minister of Agriculture
- 1974–1980: Minister of Agriculture and Irrigation
- 1980–2015: Minister of Agriculture
- 2015–present: Minister of Agriculture and Farmers' Welfare

== Cabinet ministers ==
- ^{†} Died in office
- ^{§} Re-appointed after a previous non-consecutive term

| Portrait | Minister (Birth-Death) Constituency | Term of office | | | Political party | Ministry | Prime Minister |
| Portrait | Minister (Birth-Death) Constituency | From | To | Period | Political party | Ministry | Prime Minister |
Minister of Food and Agriculture
| | Rajendra Prasad (1884–1963); MP for Bihar (Constituency Assembly) | 15 August 1947 | 14 January 1948 | 152 days | Indian National Congress | Nehru I | Jawaharlal Nehru |
| | Jairamdas Daulatram (1891–1979); MP for East Punjab (Constituent Assembly) | 19 January 1948 | 13 May 1950 | 2 years, 114 days | Indian National Congress | Nehru I | Jawaharlal Nehru |
| | Kanaiyalal Maneklal Munshi (1887–1971); MP for Bombay (Constituent Assembly) | 13 May 1950 | 13 May 1952 | 2 years, 0 days | Indian National Congress | Nehru I | Jawaharlal Nehru |
| | Rafi Ahmed Kidwai (1894–1954); MP for Bahraich District (East) | 13 May 1952 | 24 October 1954^{[†]} | 2 years, 164 days | Indian National Congress | Nehru II | Jawaharlal Nehru |
| | Panjabrao Deshmukh (1898–1965); MP for Amravati (Minister without cabinet rank) | 29 October 1954 | 25 November 1954 | 27 days | Indian National Congress | Nehru II | Jawaharlal Nehru |
| | Ajit Prasad Jain (1902–1977); MP for Saharanpur | 25 November 1954 | 17 April 1957 | 1 year, 272 days | Indian National Congress | Nehru II | Jawaharlal Nehru |
| | Ajit Prasad Jain (1902–1977); MP for Saharanpur | 17 April 1957 | 24 August 1959 | 1 year, 272 days | Indian National Congress | Nehru III | Jawaharlal Nehru |
| | S. K. Patil (1898–1981); MP for Mumbai South | 24 August 1959 | 10 April 1962 | 4 years, 8 days | Indian National Congress | Nehru III | Jawaharlal Nehru |
| | S. K. Patil (1898–1981); MP for Mumbai South | 10 April 1962 | 1 September 1963 | 4 years, 8 days | Indian National Congress | Nehru IV | Jawaharlal Nehru |
| | Swaran Singh (1907–1994); MP for Jullundur | 1 September 1963 | 27 May 1964 | 282 days | Indian National Congress | Nehru IV | Jawaharlal Nehru |
| | Swaran Singh (1907–1994); MP for Jullundur | 27 May 1964 | 9 June 1964 | 282 days | Indian National Congress | Nanda I | Gulzarilal Nanda |
| | Chidambaram Subramaniam (1910–2000); MP for Pollachi | 9 June 1964 | 24 January 1966 | 1 year, 229 days | Indian National Congress | Shastri | Lal Bahadur Shastri |
| | Chidambaram Subramaniam (1910–2000); MP for Pollachi | 9 June 1964 | 24 January 1966 | 1 year, 229 days | Indian National Congress | Nanda II | Gulzarilal Nanda |
Minister of Food, Agriculture, Community Development and Cooperation
| | Chidambaram Subramaniam (1910–2000); MP for Pollachi | 24 January 1966^{[§]} | 13 March 1967 | 1 year, 48 days | Indian National Congress | Indira I | Indira Gandhi |
| | Jagjivan Ram (1908–1986); MP for Sasaram | 13 March 1967 | 27 June 1970 | 3 years, 106 days | Indian National Congress | Indira II | Indira Gandhi |
| | Fakhruddin Ali Ahmed (1905–1977); MP for Barpeta | 27 June 1970 | 2 May 1971 | 309 days | Indian National Congress | Indira II | Indira Gandhi |
| | Fakhruddin Ali Ahmed (1905–1977); MP for Barpeta | 27 June 1970 | 2 May 1971 | 309 days | Indian National Congress (R) | Indira III | Indira Gandhi |
Minister of Agriculture
| | Fakhruddin Ali Ahmed (1905–1977); MP for Barpeta | 2 May 1971 | 3 July 1974 | 3 years, 62 days | Indian National Congress (R) | Indira III | Indira Gandhi |
| | Chidambaram Subramaniam (1910–2000); MP for Krishnagiri | 3 July 1974^{[§]} | 10 October 1974 | 99 days | Indian National Congress (R) | Indira III | Indira Gandhi |
Minister of Agriculture and Irrigation
| | Jagjivan Ram (1908–1986); MP for Sasaram | 10 October 1974^{[§]} | 2 February 1977 | 2 years, 115 days | Indian National Congress (R) | Indira III | Indira Gandhi |
| | Indira Gandhi (1917–1984); MP for Rae Bareli (Prime Minister) | 3 February 1977 | 24 March 1977 | 49 days | Indian National Congress (R) | Indira III | Indira Gandhi |
| | Morarji Desai (1896–1995); MP for Surat (Prime Minister) | 24 March 1977 | 28 March 1977 | 4 days | Janata Party | Desai | Morarji Desai |
| | Parkash Singh Badal (1927–2023); MP for Faridkot | 28 March 1977 | 17 June 1977 | 81 days | Shiromani Akali Dal | Desai | Morarji Desai |
| | Surjit Singh Barnala (1925–2017); MP for Sangrur | 18 June 1977 | 28 July 1979 | 2 years, 40 days | Shiromani Akali Dal | Desai | Morarji Desai |
| | Brahm Prakash (1918–1993); MP for Outer Delhi | 28 July 1979 | 14 January 1980 | 170 days | Indian National Congress (Urs) | Charan | Charan Singh |
Minister of Agriculture
| | Rao Birender Singh (1921–2000); MP for Mahendragarh | 14 January 1980 | 31 December 1984 | 4 years, 352 days | Indian National Congress | Indira IV | Indira Gandhi |
| | Rao Birender Singh (1921–2000); MP for Mahendragarh | 14 January 1980 | 31 December 1984 | 4 years, 352 days | Indian National Congress | Rajiv I | Rajiv Gandhi |
| | Buta Singh (1934–2021); MP for Jalore | 31 December 1984 | 12 May 1986 | 1 year, 132 days | Indian National Congress | Rajiv II | Rajiv Gandhi |
| | Gurdial Singh Dhillon (1915–1992); MP for Firozpur | 12 May 1986 | 14 February 1988 | 1 year, 278 days | Indian National Congress | Rajiv II | Rajiv Gandhi |
| | Bhajan Lal (1930–2011); Rajya Sabha MP for Haryana | 14 February 1988 | 2 December 1989 | 1 year, 291 days | Indian National Congress | Rajiv II | Rajiv Gandhi |
| | Chaudhary Devi Lal (1915–2001); MP for Sikar (Deputy Prime Minister) | 2 December 1989 | 1 August 1990 | 242 days | Janata Dal | Vishwanath | Vishwanath Pratap Singh |
| | Vishwanath Pratap Singh (1931–2008); MP for Fatehpur (Prime Minister) | 1 August 1990 | 10 November 1990 | 101 days | Janata Dal | Vishwanath | Vishwanath Pratap Singh |
| | Chaudhary Devi Lal (1915–2001); MP for Sikar (Deputy Prime Minister) | 21 November 1990^{[§]} | 21 June 1991 | 212 days | Samajwadi Janata Party (Rashtriya) | Chandra Shekhar | Chandra Shekhar |
| | Balram Jakhar (1923–2016); MP for Sikar | 21 June 1991 | 17 January 1996 | 4 years, 210 days | Indian National Congress | Rao | P. V. Narasimha Rao |
| | P. V. Narasimha Rao (1921–2004); MP for Nandyal (Prime Minister) | 17 January 1996 | 7 February 1996 | 21 days | Indian National Congress | Rao | P. V. Narasimha Rao |
| | Jagannath Mishra (1937–2019); Rajya Sabha MP for Bihar | 7 February 1996 | 16 May 1996 | 99 days | Indian National Congress | Rao | P. V. Narasimha Rao |
| | Suraj Bhan (1928–2006); MP for Ambala | 16 May 1996 | 1 June 1996 | 16 days | Bharatiya Janata Party | Vajpayee I | Atal Bihari Vajpayee |
| | H. D. Deve Gowda (born 1933); Unelected (Prime Minister) | 1 June 1996 | 29 June 1996 | 28 days | Janata Dal | Deve Gowda | H. D. Deve Gowda |
| | Chaturanan Mishra (1925–2011); MP for Madhubani | 29 June 1996 | 21 April 1997 | 1 year, 263 days | Communist Party of India | Deve Gowda | H. D. Deve Gowda |
| | Chaturanan Mishra (1925–2011); MP for Madhubani | 21 April 1997 | 19 March 1998 | 1 year, 263 days | Communist Party of India | Gujral | Inder Kumar Gujral |
| | Atal Bihari Vajpayee (1924–2018); MP for Lucknow (Prime Minister) | 19 March 1998 | 13 October 1999 | 5 years, 66 days | Bharatiya Janata Party | Vajpayee II | Atal Bihari Vajpayee |
| | Atal Bihari Vajpayee (1924–2018); MP for Lucknow (Prime Minister) | 13 October 1999 | 22 November 1999 | 5 years, 66 days | Bharatiya Janata Party | Vajpayee III | Atal Bihari Vajpayee |
| | Nitish Kumar (born 1951); MP for Barh | 22 November 1999 | 3 March 2000 | 102 days | Samata Party | Vajpayee III | Atal Bihari Vajpayee |
| | Atal Bihari Vajpayee (1924–2018); MP for Lucknow (Prime Minister) | 3 March 2000 | 6 March 2000 | 3 days | Bharatiya Janata Party | Vajpayee III | Atal Bihari Vajpayee |
| | Sundar Lal Patwa (1924–2016); MP for Narmadapuram | 6 March 2000 | 27 May 2000 | 82 days | Bharatiya Janata Party | Vajpayee III | Atal Bihari Vajpayee |
| | Nitish Kumar (born 1951); MP for Barh | 27 May 2000^{[§]} | 22 July 2001 | 1 year, 56 days | Samata Party | Vajpayee III | Atal Bihari Vajpayee |
| | Ajit Singh (1939–2021); MP for Baghpat | 22 July 2001 | 24 May 2003 | 1 year, 306 days | Rashtriya Lok Dal | Vajpayee III | Atal Bihari Vajpayee |
| | Rajnath Singh (born 1951); Rajya Sabha MP for Uttar Pradesh | 24 May 2003 | 22 May 2004 | 364 days | Bharatiya Janata Party | Vajpayee III | Atal Bihari Vajpayee |
| | Sharad Pawar (born 1940); MP for Baramati, until 2009; MP for Madha, 2009–2014; Rajya Sabha MP for Maharashtra, from 2014 | 23 May 2004 | 26 May 2014 | 10 years, 3 days | Nationalist Congress Party | Manmohan I | Manmohan Singh |
| | Sharad Pawar (born 1940); MP for Baramati, until 2009; MP for Madha, 2009–2014; Rajya Sabha MP for Maharashtra, from 2014 | 23 May 2004 | 26 May 2014 | 10 years, 3 days | Nationalist Congress Party | Manmohan II | Manmohan Singh |
| | Radha Mohan Singh (born 1949); MP for Purvi Champaran | 27 May 2014 | 27 August 2015 | 1 year, 92 days | Bharatiya Janata Party | Modi I | Narendra Modi |
Minister of Agriculture and Farmers' Welfare
| | Radha Mohan Singh (born 1949); MP for Purvi Champaran | 27 August 2015 | 30 May 2019 | 3 years, 276 days | Bharatiya Janata Party | Modi I | Narendra Modi |
| | Narendra Singh Tomar (born 1957); MP for Morena | 31 May 2019 | 7 December 2023 | 4 years, 190 days | Bharatiya Janata Party | Modi II | Narendra Modi |
| | Arjun Munda (born 1968); MP for Khunti | 7 December 2023 | 9 June 2024 | 185 days | Bharatiya Janata Party | Modi II | Narendra Modi |
| | Shivraj Singh Chouhan (born 1959); MP for Vidisha | 10 June 2024 | Incumbent | 2 years, 154 days | Bharatiya Janata Party | Modi III | Narendra Modi |

== Ministers of state ==
| Portrait | Minister (Birth-Death) Constituency | Term of office | | | Political party | Ministry | Prime Minister |
| Portrait | Minister (Birth-Death) Constituency | From | To | Period | Political party | Ministry | Prime Minister |
Minister of State for Food and Agriculture
| | Panjabrao Deshmukh (1898–1965); MP for Amravati; Minister of Cooperation from 25 Apr 1957 | 17 April 1952 | 10 April 1962 | 9 years, 358 days | Indian National Congress | Nehru III | Jawaharlal Nehru |
| | Ram Subhag Singh (1917–1980); MP for Bikramganj | 8 May 1962 | 27 May 1964 | 2 years, 19 days | Indian National Congress | Nehru IV | Jawaharlal Nehru |
| | Alungal Mathai Thomas (1912–1981); MP for Ernakulam | 21 November 1963 | 27 May 1964 | 10 years, 188 days | Indian National Congress | Nehru IV | Jawaharlal Nehru |
| | Ram Subhag Singh (1917–1980); MP for Bikramganj | 27 May 1964 | 9 June 1964 | 13 days | Indian National Congress | Nanda I | Gulzarilal Nanda |
| | Alungal Mathai Thomas (1912–1981); MP for Ernakulam | 27 May 1964 | 9 June 1964 | 17 days | Indian National Congress | Nanda I | Gulzarilal Nanda |
| | Alungal Mathai Thomas (1912–1981); MP for Ernakulam | 9 June 1964 | 13 June 1964 | 17 days | Indian National Congress | Shastri | Lal Bahadur Shastri |
Minister of State for Food, Agriculture, Community Development and Cooperation
| | Panampilly Govinda Menon (1906–1970); MP for Mukundapuram | 24 January 1966 | 13 March 1967 | 1 year, 48 days | Indian National Congress | Indira I | Indira Gandhi |
| | Annasaheb Shinde Patil (1922–1993); MP for Kopargaon | 13 March 1967 | 18 March 1971 | 4 years, 5 days | Indian National Congress | Indira II | Indira Gandhi |
| | M. S. Gurupadaswamy (1924–2011); Rajya Sabha MP for Uttar Pradesh | 5 June 1967 | 17 October 1969 | 2 years, 134 days | Indian National Congress | Indira II | Indira Gandhi |
| | Annasaheb Shinde Patil (1922–1993); MP for Kopargaon | 18 March 1971 | 2 May 1971 | 45 days | Indian National Congress | Indira III | Indira Gandhi |
Minister of State for Agriculture
| | Sher Singh Kadyan (1917–2009); MP for Rohtak | 2 May 1971 | 12 January 1974 | 2 years, 255 days | Indian National Congress (R) | Indira III | Indira Gandhi |
| | Annasaheb Shinde Patil (1922–1993); MP for Kopargaon | 2 May 1971 | 10 October 1974 | 3 years, 161 days | Indian National Congress (R) | Indira III | Indira Gandhi |
| | Buddha Priya Maurya (1926–2004); MP for Hapur | 11 January 1974 | 10 October 1974 | 272 days | Indian National Congress (R) | Indira III | Indira Gandhi |
Minister of State for Agriculture and Irrigation
| | Annasaheb Shinde Patil (1922–1993); MP for Kopargaon | 10 October 1974 | 24 March 1977 | 2 years, 165 days | Indian National Congress (R) | Indira III | Indira Gandhi |
| | Shah Nawaz Khan (1914–1993); MP for Meerut | 10 October 1974 | 24 March 1977 | 2 years, 165 days | Indian National Congress (R) | Indira III | Indira Gandhi |
| | Bhanu Pratap Singh (born 1935); Rajya Sabha MP for Uttar Pradesh | 14 August 1977 | 15 July 1979 | 1 year, 335 days | Janata Party | Desai | Morarji Desai |
| | Nathuram Mirdha (1921–1996); MP for Nagaur | 4 August 1979 | 25 October 1979 | 82 days | Janata Party (Secular) | Charan | Charan Singh |
| | M. V. Krishnappa (1918–1980); MP for Chikballapur | 4 August 1979 | 14 January 1980 | 163 days | Janata Party (Secular) | Charan | Charan Singh |
Minister of State for Agriculture
| | R. V. Swaminathan; MP for Sivaganga | 14 January 1980 | 29 January 1983 | 3 years, 15 days | Indian National Congress | Indira IV | Indira Gandhi |
| | Baleshwar Ram (1928–2015); MP for Rosera; Minister of State, Rural Development | 16 January 1982 | 29 January 1983 | 1 year, 13 days | Indian National Congress | Indira IV | Indira Gandhi |
| | Arif Mohammad Khan (born 1951); MP for Bahraich | 29 January 1983 | 7 February 1984 | 1 year, 9 days | Indian National Congress | Indira IV | Indira Gandhi |
| | Yogendra Makwana (born 1933); Rajya Sabha MP for Gujarat | 29 January 1983 | 31 October 1984 | 1 year, 276 days | Indian National Congress | Indira IV | Indira Gandhi |
| | Yogendra Makwana (born 1933); Rajya Sabha MP for Gujarat | 4 November 1984 | 31 December 1984 | 57 days | Indian National Congress | Rajiv I | Rajiv Gandhi |
| | Chandulal Chandrakar (1920–1995); MP for Durg | 1 January 1985 | 27 January 1986 | 1 year, 26 days | Indian National Congress | Rajiv II | Rajiv Gandhi |
| | K. Natwar Singh (born 1929); MP for Bharatpur (Fertilizers) | 25 September 1985 | 22 October 1986 | 1 year, 27 days | Indian National Congress | Rajiv II | Rajiv Gandhi |
| | Yogendra Makwana (born 1933); Rajya Sabha MP for Gujarat; Minister of State, Agriculture and Cooperation | 25 September 1985 | 14 February 1988 | 2 years, 142 days | Indian National Congress | Rajiv II | Rajiv Gandhi |
| | Ramanand Yadav (born 1927); Rajya Sabha MP for Bihar; Minister of State, Rural Development | 12 May 1986 | 14 February 1988 | 1 year, 278 days | Indian National Congress | Rajiv II | Rajiv Gandhi |
| | R. Prabhu (born 1947); MP for Nilgiris | 22 October 1986 | 2 December 1989 | 3 years, 41 days | Indian National Congress | Rajiv II | Rajiv Gandhi |
| | Hari Krishna Shastri (1988–1989); MP for Fatehpur; Minister of State, Agriculture Research and Education | 14 February 1988 | 2 December 1989 | 1 year, 291 days | Indian National Congress | Rajiv II | Rajiv Gandhi |
| | Shyamlal Yadav (1927–2005); MP for Varanasi; Minister of State, Agriculture and Cooperation | 14 February 1988 | 2 December 1989 | 1 year, 291 days | Indian National Congress | Rajiv II | Rajiv Gandhi |
| | Janardhana Poojary (born 1937); MP for Mangalore; Minister of State, Rural Development | 14 February 1988 | 2 December 1989 | 1 year, 291 days | Indian National Congress | Rajiv II | Rajiv Gandhi |
| | Nitish Kumar (born 1951); MP for Barh; Minister of State, Agriculture and Cooperation | 23 April 1990 | 10 November 1990 | 201 days | Janata Dal | Vishwanath | Vishwanath Pratap Singh |
| | Upendra Nath Verma; MP for Chatra; Minister of State, Rural Development | 23 April 1990 | 10 November 1990 | 201 days | Janata Dal | Vishwanath | Vishwanath Pratap Singh |
| | Jayantilal Shah (born 1928); MP for Banaskantha; Minister of State, Agriculture and Cooperation | 21 November 1990 | 25 April 1991 | 155 days | Samajwadi Janata Party (Rashtriya) | Chandra Shekhar | Chandra Shekhar |
| | Ram Bahadur Singh (1934–2006); MP for Maharajganj; Minister of State, Rural Development | 21 November 1990 | 21 June 1991 | 212 days | Samajwadi Janata Party (Rashtriya) | Chandra Shekhar | Chandra Shekhar |
| | Mullappally Ramachandran (born 1944); MP for Kannur | 21 June 1991 | 17 January 1993 | 1 year, 210 days | Indian National Congress | Rao | P. V. Narasimha Rao |
| | Kahnu Charan Lenka (born 1939); Rajya Sabha MP for Odisha | 21 June 1991 | 18 January 1993 | 1 year, 211 days | Indian National Congress | Rao | P. V. Narasimha Rao |
| | Arvind Netam (born 1942); MP for Kanker | 18 January 1993 | 20 February 1996 | 3 years, 33 days | Indian National Congress | Rao | P. V. Narasimha Rao |
| | S. Krishna Kumar (born 1993); MP for Kollam | 19 February 1993 | 13 May 1995 | 2 years, 83 days | Indian National Congress | Rao | P. V. Narasimha Rao |
| | Risaldar-major (Honorary Captain); Mohd. Ayub Khan VrC (1932–2016); MP for Jhunjhunu | 15 September 1995 | 16 May 1996 | 244 days | Indian National Congress | Rao | P. V. Narasimha Rao |
| | Ummareddy Venkateswarlu (born 1935); MP for Bapatla | 1 June 1996 | 29 June 1996 | 28 days | Telugu Desam Party | Deve Gowda | H. D. Deve Gowda |
| | Samudrala Venugopal Chary (born 1959); MP for Adilabad | 9 June 1997 | 19 March 1998 | 283 days | Telugu Desam Party | Gujral | Inder Kumar Gujral |
| | Sompal Shastri (born 1942); MP for Baghpat | 19 March 1998 | 13 October 1999 | 1 year, 208 days | Bharatiya Janata Party | Vajpayee II | Atal Bihari Vajpayee |
| | Hukmdev Narayan Yadav (born 1939); MP for Madhubani | 13 October 1999 | 27 May 2000 | 227 days | Bharatiya Janata Party | Vajpayee III | Atal Bihari Vajpayee |
| | Syed Shahnawaz Hussain (born 1968); MP for Kishanganj; Minister of State, Food Processing Industries | 13 October 1999 | 27 May 2000 | 227 days | Bharatiya Janata Party | Vajpayee III | Atal Bihari Vajpayee |
| | S. B. P. B. K. Satyanarayana Rao (1921–2011); MP for Rajahmundry | 13 October 1999 | 29 September 2000 | 352 days | Bharatiya Janata Party | Vajpayee III | Atal Bihari Vajpayee |
| | Thounaojam Chaoba Singh (born 1937); MP for Inner Manipur; Minister of State, Food Processing Industries | 27 May 2000 | 1 September 2001 | 1 year, 97 days | Bharatiya Janata Party | Vajpayee III | Atal Bihari Vajpayee |
| | Debendra Pradhan (born 1941); MP for Deogarh | 27 May 2000 | 29 January 2003 | 2 years, 247 days | Bharatiya Janata Party | Vajpayee III | Atal Bihari Vajpayee |
| | Shripad Naik (born 1952); MP for Panaji | 30 September 2000 | 2 November 2001 | 1 year, 33 days | Bharatiya Janata Party | Vajpayee III | Atal Bihari Vajpayee |
| | Hukmdev Narayan Yadav (born 1939); MP for Madhubani | 2 November 2001 | 22 May 2004 | 2 years, 202 days | Bharatiya Janata Party | Vajpayee III | Atal Bihari Vajpayee |
| | Kantilal Bhuria (born 1950); MP for Ratlam | 23 May 2004 | 22 May 2009 | 4 years, 364 days | Indian National Congress | Manmohan I | Manmohan Singh |
| | Akhilesh Prasad Singh (born 1962); MP for Motihari | 23 May 2004 | 22 May 2009 | 4 years, 364 days | Rashtriya Janata Dal | Manmohan I | Manmohan Singh |
| | Mohammed Taslimuddin (1943–2017); MP for Kishanganj | 25 May 2004 | 22 May 2009 | 4 years, 362 days | Rashtriya Janata Dal | Manmohan I | Manmohan Singh |
| | K. V. Thomas (born 1946); MP for Ernakulam | 29 May 2009 | 19 January 2011 | 2 years, 51 days | Indian National Congress | Manmohan II | Manmohan Singh |
| | Harish Rawat (born 1948); MP for Haridwar | 19 January 2011 | 28 October 2012 | 1 year, 283 days | Indian National Congress | Manmohan II | Manmohan Singh |
| | Arun Subhashchandra Yadav (born 1974); MP for Khandwa | 19 January 2011 | 12 July 2011 | 174 days | Indian National Congress | Manmohan II | Manmohan Singh |
| | Charan Das Mahant (born 1954); MP for Korba | 12 July 2011 | 26 May 2014 | 2 years, 318 days | Indian National Congress | Manmohan II | Manmohan Singh |
| | Tariq Anwar (born 1951); Rajya Sabha MP for Maharashtra | 28 October 2012 | 26 May 2014 | 1 year, 210 days | Nationalist Congress Party | Manmohan II | Manmohan Singh |
| | Sanjeev Balyan (born 1972); MP for Muzaffarnagar | 27 May 2014 | 27 August 2015 | 1 year, 92 days | Bharatiya Janata Party | Modi I | Narendra Modi |
| | Mohan Kundariya (born 1951); MP for Rajkot | 9 November 2014 | 27 August 2015 | 291 days | Bharatiya Janata Party | Modi I | Narendra Modi |
Minister of State for Agriculture and Farmers' Welfare
| | Sanjeev Balyan (born 1972); MP for Muzaffarnagar | 27 August 2015 | 3 September 2017 | 2 years, 7 days | Bharatiya Janata Party | Modi I | Narendra Modi |
| | Mohan Kundariya (born 1951); MP for Rajkot | 27 August 2015 | 5 July 2016 | 313 days | Bharatiya Janata Party | Modi I | Narendra Modi |
| | S. S. Ahluwalia (born 1951); MP for Darjeeling | 5 July 2016 | 3 September 2017 | 1 year, 60 days | Bharatiya Janata Party | Modi I | Narendra Modi |
| | Sudarshan Bhagat (born 1969); MP for Lohardaga | 5 July 2016 | 3 September 2017 | 1 year, 60 days | Bharatiya Janata Party | Modi I | Narendra Modi |
| | Parshottam Rupala (born 1954); Rajya Sabha MP for Gujarat | 5 July 2016 | 30 May 2019 | 2 years, 329 days | Bharatiya Janata Party | Modi I | Narendra Modi |
| | Krishna Raj (born 1967); MP for Shahjahanpur | 3 September 2017 | 30 May 2019 | 1 year, 269 days | Bharatiya Janata Party | Modi I | Narendra Modi |
| | Gajendra Singh Shekhawat (born 1967); MP for Jodhpur | 3 September 2017 | 30 May 2019 | 1 year, 269 days | Bharatiya Janata Party | Modi I | Narendra Modi |
| | Parshottam Rupala (born 1954); Rajya Sabha MP for Gujarat | 31 May 2019 | 7 July 2021 | 2 years, 37 days | Bharatiya Janata Party | Modi II | Narendra Modi |
| | Kailash Choudhary (born 1973); MP for Barmer | 31 May 2019 | 9 June 2024 | 5 years, 9 days | Bharatiya Janata Party | Modi II | Narendra Modi |
| | Shobha Karandlaje (born 1966); MP for Udupi Chikmagalur | 7 July 2021 | 9 June 2024 | 2 years, 338 days | Bharatiya Janata Party | Modi II | Narendra Modi |
| | Bhagirath Choudhary (born 1954); MP for Ajmer | 10 June 2024 | Incumbent | 2 years, 154 days | Bharatiya Janata Party | Modi III | Narendra Modi |
| | Ram Nath Thakur (born 1950); Rajya Sabha MP for Bihar | 10 June 2024 | Incumbent | 2 years, 154 days | Janata Dal (United) | Modi III | Narendra Modi |

== Deputy ministers ==
| Portrait | Minister (Birth-Death) Constituency | Term of office | | | Political party | Ministry | Prime Minister |
| Portrait | Minister (Birth-Death) Constituency | From | To | Period | Political party | Ministry | Prime Minister |
Deputy Minister of Food and Agriculture
| | Mosalikanti Thirumala Rao (1901–1970); MP for Madras (Interim) | 21 August 1950 | 13 May 1952 | 1 year, 266 days | Indian National Congress | Nehru I | Jawaharlal Nehru |
| | M. V. Krishnappa (1918–1980); MP for Kolar, till 1957; MP for Tumkur, from 1957 | 12 August 1952 | 17 April 1957 | 4 years, 256 days | Indian National Congress | Nehru II | Jawaharlal Nehru |
| | M. V. Krishnappa (1918–1980); MP for Kolar, till 1957; MP for Tumkur, from 1957 | 17 April 1957 | 25 April 1957 | 4 years, 256 days | Indian National Congress | Nehru III | Jawaharlal Nehru |
| | Alungal Mathai Thomas (1912–1981); MP for Ernakulam | 25 April 1957 | 10 April 1962 | 6 years, 210 days | Indian National Congress | Nehru III | Jawaharlal Nehru |
| | Alungal Mathai Thomas (1912–1981); MP for Ernakulam | 16 April 1962 | 21 November 1963 | 6 years, 210 days | Indian National Congress | Nehru IV | Jawaharlal Nehru |
| | Shah Nawaz Khan (1914–1993); MP for Meerut | 15 June 1964 | 11 January 1966 | 1 year, 210 days | Indian National Congress | Shastri | Lal Bahadur Shastri |
| | Dajisaheb Chavan (1916–1973); MP for Karad | 15 June 1964 | 11 January 1966 | 1 year, 210 days | Indian National Congress | Shastri | Lal Bahadur Shastri |
| | Shah Nawaz Khan (1914–1993); MP for Meerut | 11 January 1966 | 24 January 1966 | 13 days | Indian National Congress | Nanda II | Gulzarilal Nanda |
| | Dajisaheb Chavan (1916–1973); MP for Karad | 11 January 1966 | 24 January 1966 | 13 days | Indian National Congress | Nanda II | Gulzarilal Nanda |
Deputy Minister of Food, Agriculture, Community Development and Cooperation
| | Annasaheb Shinde (1922–1993); MP for Kopargaon | 24 January 1966 | 13 March 1967 | 1 year, 48 days | Indian National Congress | Indira I | Indira Gandhi |
| | Shyam Dhar Mishra (1919–2001); MP for Mirzapur | 14 February 1966 | 13 March 1967 | 1 year, 27 days | Indian National Congress | Indira I | Indira Gandhi |
| | Annasaheb Shinde (1922–1993); MP for Kopargaon | 13 March 1967 | 18 March 1971 | 4 years, 5 days | Indian National Congress | Indira II | Indira Gandhi |
| | Daying Ering (1929–1970); MP for NEFA | 18 March 1967 | 21 June 1970^{[†]} | 3 years, 95 days | Indian National Congress | Indira II | Indira Gandhi |
| | Jagannath Pahadia (1932–1991); MP for Bayana | 26 June 1970 | 18 March 1971 | 270 days | Indian National Congress (R) | Indira II | Indira Gandhi |
| | S. C. Jamir (born 1931); MP for Nagaland | 27 June 1970 | 18 March 1971 | 264 days | Indian National Congress (R) | Indira II | Indira Gandhi |
Deputy Minister of Agriculture
| | Jagannath Pahadia (1932–1991); MP for Bayana | 2 May 1971 | 22 July 1972 | 1 year, 81 days | Indian National Congress (R) | Indira III | Indira Gandhi |
Deputy Minister of Agriculture and Irrigation
| | Kedar Nath Singh; MP for Sultanpur | 10 October 1974 | 24 March 1977 | 2 years, 165 days | Indian National Congress (R) | Indira III | Indira Gandhi |
| | Prabhudas Patel (1914–2013); MP for Dabhoi | 23 October 1974 | 14 March 1977 | 2 years, 142 days | Indian National Congress (R) | Indira III | Indira Gandhi |
Deputy Minister of Agriculture
| | Kamla Kumari (born 1937); MP for Palamu | 19 October 1980 | 29 January 1983 | 2 years, 102 days | Indian National Congress | Indira IV | Indira Gandhi |
| | Mohammed Usman Arif (1923–1995); Rajya Sabha MP for Rajasthan | 15 January 1982 | 6 September 1982 | 234 days | Indian National Congress | Indira IV | Indira Gandhi |
