= Genda Singh =

Indian politician

Member of Parliament, Lok Sabha
- In office 1971-1977
- Preceded by: Kashi Nath Pandey
- Succeeded by: Ram Dhari Shastri
- Constituency: Padrauna, Uttar Pradesh

Personal details
- Party: Indian National Congress
- Other political affiliations: Praja Socialist Party
- Spouse: Sarasvati Devi

Genda Singh is an Indian politician. He was elected to the Lok Sabha, the lower house of the Parliament of India from Padrauna, Uttar Pradesh as a member of the Indian National Congress.
