= Chandra Pratap Narain Singh =

- Portrait of Chandra Pratap Narain Singh

Minister of State for Defence
- In office 3 March 1980 – 19 October 1980
- President: Neelam Sanjiva Reddy
- Prime Minister: Indira Gandhi
- Vice President: Mohammad Hidayatullah
- Preceded by: Jagbir Singh
- Succeeded by: Shivraj Patil

Minister of State in the Ministry of Energy(Non-Conventional Energy Sources)
- In office 2 September 1982 – 2 February 1983
- President: Zail Singh
- Prime Minister: Indira Gandhi

Minister of State in the Department of Ocean Development
- In office 15 February 1982 – 2 February 1983
- President: Neelam Sanjiva Reddy
- Prime Minister: Indira Gandhi

Minister of State in the Department of Environment
- In office 15 January 1982 – 2 September 1982
- President: Neelam Sanjiva Reddy
- Prime Minister: Indira Gandhi

Minister of State in the Department of Electronics
- In office 30 October 1980 – 2 February 1983
- President: Neelam Sanjiva Reddy
- Prime Minister: Indira Gandhi

Minister of State in the Department of Science and Technology
- In office 19 October 1980 – 2 February 1983
- President: Neelam Sanjiva Reddy
- Prime Minister: Indira Gandhi

Member of Parliament, Lok Sabha
- In office 1980–1989
- Preceded by: Ram Dhari Shastri
- Succeeded by: Baleshar
- Constituency: Padrauna, Uttar Pradesh

Member of Uttar Pradesh Legislative Assembly
- In office 1969 – 1974
- Preceded by: Chandradeo
- Succeeded by: Purushottam Kaushik
- Constituency: Padrauna, Uttar Pradesh

3rd Rai Bahadur of Jagdishgarh Estate
- Reign: 1955 – 1989
- Predecessor: Rudra Pratap Narain Singh
- Born: 28 March 1935; Gorakhpur, United Provinces of Agra and Oudh, British India
- Died: 26 November 1989 (aged 54); Padrauna, India
- Cause of death: Assassination by gunshot
- Spouse: Kunwarani Mohini Devi
- House: Gaharwar
- Education: The Doon School
- Political party: Bharatiya Kranti Dal (1969–1980); Indian National Congress (Indira) (1980–1984); Indian National Congress (1984–1989)
- Children: 2

Chandra Pratap Narain Singh or C.P.N. Singh (28 March 1935 – 26 November 1989) was an Indian politician who served as the Minister of State for Defence from March, 1980 to October, 1980 and the Rai Bahadur of Jagdishgarh Estate, Padrauna.

== Personal life ==
Singh was born on 28 March 1935, in Hindu rajput zamindar family of Gaharwar clan. C.P.N. Singh was grandson of Rai Bahadur Jagdish Narain Singh (who was granted the Jagdishgarh Estate (Chhote Durbar) and the title of Rai Bahadur in 1932), Managing Director of the Padrauna Raj Krishna Sugar Works Ltd. He became the Rai Bahadur of Jagdishgarh Estate(Chote Durbar), Padrauna at the age of 20 in 1955.

C.P.N. Singh was elected to the Uttar Pradesh Legislative Assembly from the Padrauna constituency in 1969. He was subsequently elected to the Lok Sabha from the Padrauna constituency in 1980 and 1984.
