= Padrauna Lok Sabha constituency =

Former Lok Sabha constituency

Coordinates: 26.9°N 84.0°E

Padrauna
- Former Lok Sabha constituency

Constituency details
- Country: India
- Region: North India
- State: Uttar Pradesh
- Established: 1957
- Abolished: 2008

Padrauna was a Lok Sabha constituency in Uttar Pradesh state in northern India until 2008.

== Assembly segments ==
Padrauna Lok Sabha constituency had the following five Vidhan Sabha (legislative assembly) constituencies:

1. Naurangia
2. Ramkola
3. Hata
4. Padrauna
5. Seorahi

== Members of Parliament ==
Election	Member	Party
1957	Kashi Nath Pandey	Indian National Congress
1962	Kashi Nath Pandey	Indian National Congress
1967	Kashi Nath Pandey	Indian National Congress
1971	Genda Singh	Indian National Congress
1977	Ram Dhari Shastri	Janata Party
1980	Kunwar Chandra Pratap Narain Singh	Indian National Congress (I)
1984	Kunwar Chandra Pratap Narain Singh	Indian National Congress (I)
1989	Baleshwar Yadav	Janata Dal
1991	Ram Nagina Mishra	Bharatiya Janata Party
1996	Ram Nagina Mishra	Bharatiya Janata Party
1998	Ram Nagina Mishra	Bharatiya Janata Party
1999	Ram Nagina Mishra	Bharatiya Janata Party
2004	Baleshwar Yadav	National Loktantrik Party
Constituency Demolished in 2008 and newly created as Kushi Nagar Lok Sabha constituency.

== See also ==
- Kushi Nagar Lok Sabha constituency
- List of former constituencies of the Lok Sabha
