= Baleshwar Yadav (politician) =

Indian politician

Member, Lok Sabha
- In office 2004–2009
- Constituency: Padrauna

Personal details
- Born: 1 January 1942 (age 84) Rudrapur, United Provinces, British India
- Party: Samajwadi Party
- Spouse: Kalawati Devi
- Children: 1 son and 4 daughters
- As of 22 September, 2006

Baleshwar Yadav (born 1 January 1942) is an Indian politician. He stood for the 2004 Lok Sabha elections and he was elected from Padrauna for the 14th Lok Sabha.
