= Ministry of Power (India) =

Government ministry of India

- Branch of Government of India

- Ministry of Power

Ministry overview
- Formed: 2 July 1992; 34 years ago
- Preceding Ministry: Ministry of Energy Sources
- Jurisdiction: Government of India
- Headquarters: Shram Shakti Bhawan, Rafi Marg, New Delhi, India
- Annual budget: ₹29,996.85 crore (US$3.1 billion) (2026–27)
- Minister responsible: Manohar Lal Khattar
- Ministry executive: Pankaj Agrawal, IAS, Power Secretary
- Website: powermin.gov.in

The Ministry of Power (IAST: Vidyut Mantrālaya) is a ministry of the Government of India. It is mainly responsible for the maintenance and regulation of Power sector in India. It is headed by Minister of Power.

The ministry is charged with overseeing electricity production and infrastructure development, including generation, transmission, and delivery, as well as maintenance projects.

The ministry acts as a liaison between the central government and state electricity operations, as well as with the private sector.

== History ==
The Ministry of Power became a ministry on July 2, 1992, during the P. V. Narasimha Rao government. Prior to that time it had been a department (the Department of Power) in the Ministry of Power, Coal and Non-Conventional Energy Sources. That ministry was split into the Ministry of Power, Ministry of Coal, and Ministry of Non-Conventional Energy Sources (renamed the Ministry of New and Renewable Energy in 2006).

== Organisation ==
=== Central Public Sector Undertakings ===
- NTPC Limited
  - North Eastern Electric Power Corporation Limited
- Power Grid Corporation of India
- Grid Controller of India Limited
- NHPC Limited
- Power Finance Corporation
  - REC Limited
    - REC Power Development and Consultancy Limited
  - Power Finance Consulting Limited
- Damodar Valley Corporation
- Bihar Grid Company Limited, a JV of Power Grid and BSP(H)CL

=== Statutory Bodies ===
- Bureau of Energy Efficiency (BEE)
- Central Electricity Authority (CEA)
- Central Electricity Regulatory Commission (CERC)
- Joint Electricity Regulatory Commission (JERC)

=== Autonoumous Bodies ===
- Central Power Research Institute, Bengaluru
- Bhakra Beas Management Board (BBMB)
- National Power Training Institute (NPTI), Faridabad

== Cabinet Ministers ==
- Note: I/C – Independent Charge
- Key: ^{†} Died in office

Portrait	Minister (Birth-Death) Constituency	Term of office			Political party	Ministry	Prime Minister		
Portrait	Minister (Birth-Death) Constituency	From	To	Period	Political party	Ministry	Prime Minister		
Minister of Works, Mines and Power
	Narhar Vishnu Gadgil (1896–1966); Constituent Assembly Member for Bombay	15 August 1947	26 December 1950	3 years, 133 days	Indian National Congress	Nehru I	Jawaharlal Nehru		
Minister of Natural Resources and Scientific Research
	Sri Prakasa (1890–1971)	26 December 1950	13 May 1952	1 year, 139 days	Indian National Congress	Nehru I	Jawaharlal Nehru		
	Maulana Abul Kalam Azad (1888–1958); MP for Rampur	13 May 1952	6 June 1952	24 days	Indian National Congress	Nehru II	Jawaharlal Nehru		
Minister of Irrigation and Power
	Gulzarilal Nanda (1898–1998); MP for Sabarkantha	6 June 1952	17 April 1957	4 years, 315 days	Indian National Congress	Nehru II	Jawaharlal Nehru		
	S. K. Patil (1898–1981); MP for Mumbai South	17 April 1957	2 April 1958	350 days	Indian National Congress	Nehru III	Jawaharlal Nehru		
	Hafiz Mohamad Ibrahim (1889–1968); Rajya Sabha MP for Uttar Pradesh	2 April 1958	10 April 1962	5 years, 85 days	Indian National Congress	Nehru III	Jawaharlal Nehru		
	Hafiz Mohamad Ibrahim (1889–1968); Rajya Sabha MP for Uttar Pradesh	10 April 1962	26 June 1963	5 years, 85 days	Indian National Congress	Nehru IV	Jawaharlal Nehru		
	O. V. Alagesan (1911–1992); MP for Chengalpattu (Minister of State)	26 June 1963	19 July 1963	23 days	Indian National Congress	Nehru IV	Jawaharlal Nehru		
	Kanuri Lakshmana Rao (1902–1986); MP for Vijayawada (Minister of State)	19 July 1963	27 May 1964	326 days	Indian National Congress	Nehru IV	Jawaharlal Nehru		
	Kanuri Lakshmana Rao (1902–1986); MP for Vijayawada (Minister of State)	27 May 1964	9 June 1964	326 days	Indian National Congress	Nanda I	Gulzarilal Nanda		
	H. C. Dasappa (1894–1964); MP for Bangalore	9 June 1964	19 July 1964	40 days	Indian National Congress	Shastri	Lal Bahadur Shastri		
	Kanuri Lakshmana Rao (1902–1986); MP for Vijayawada (Minister of State)	19 July 1964	11 January 1966	1 year, 189 days	Indian National Congress	Shastri	Lal Bahadur Shastri		
	Kanuri Lakshmana Rao (1902–1986); MP for Vijayawada (Minister of State)	11 January 1966	24 January 1966	1 year, 189 days	Indian National Congress	Nanda II	Gulzarilal Nanda		
	Fakhruddin Ali Ahmed (1905–1977); MP for Barpeta	24 January 1966	13 November 1966	293 days	Indian National Congress	Indira I	Indira Gandhi		
	Kanuri Lakshmana Rao (1902–1986); MP for Vijayawada (Minister of State)	13 November 1966	13 March 1967	6 years, 361 days	Indian National Congress	Indira I	Indira Gandhi		
	Kanuri Lakshmana Rao (1902–1986); MP for Vijayawada (Minister of State)	13 March 1967	18 March 1971	6 years, 361 days	Indian National Congress	Indira II	Indira Gandhi		
	Kanuri Lakshmana Rao (1902–1986); MP for Vijayawada (Minister of State)	18 March 1971	9 November 1973	6 years, 361 days	Indian National Congress (R)	Indira II	Indira Gandhi		
	K. C. Pant (1931–2012); MP for Nainital (Minister of State)	9 November 1973	10 October 1974	335 days	Indian National Congress (R)	Indira II	Indira Gandhi		
Minister of Energy
	K. C. Pant (1931–2012); MP for Nainital (MoS)	10 October 1974	24 March 1977	335 days	Indian National Congress (R)	Indira II	Indira Gandhi		
	P. Ramachandran (1921–2001); MP for Chennai Central	26 March 1977	28 July 1979	2 years, 124 days	Janata Party	Desai	Morarji Desai		
	K. C. Pant (1931–2012); Rajya Sabha MP for Uttar Pradesh	30 July 1979	14 January 1980	168 days	Indian National Congress (Urs)	Charan	Charan Singh		
	A. B. A. Ghani Khan Choudhury (1927–2006); MP for Malda	14 January 1980	2 September 1982	2 years, 231 days	Indian National Congress	Indira IV	Indira Gandhi		
	P. Shiv Shankar (1929–2017); MP for Secunderabad	2 September 1982	31 October 1984	2 years, 120 days	Indian National Congress	Indira IV	Indira Gandhi		
	P. Shiv Shankar (1929–2017); MP for Secunderabad	31 October 1984	31 December 1984	2 years, 120 days	Indian National Congress	Rajiv I	Rajiv Gandhi		
	Vasant Sathe (1925–2011); MP for Wardha	31 December 1984	3 September 1988	3 years, 247 days	Indian National Congress	Rajiv II	Rajiv Gandhi		
	Makhan Lal Fotedar (1932–2017); Rajya Sabha MP for Uttar Pradesh	3 September 1988	19 September 1988	16 days	Indian National Congress	Rajiv II	Rajiv Gandhi		
	Vasant Sathe (1925–2011); MP for Wardha	19 September 1988	2 December 1989	1 year, 74 days	Indian National Congress	Rajiv II	Rajiv Gandhi		
	Arif Mohammad Khan (born 1951); MP for Bahraich	6 December 1989	10 November 1990	339 days	Janata Dal	Vishwanath	V. P. Singh		
	Kalyan Singh Kalvi (born 1933); MP for Barmer	21 November 1990	21 June 1991	212 days	Samajwadi Janata Party (Rashtriya)	Chandra Shekhar	Chandra Shekhar		
Minister of Power
	Kalpnath Rai (1941–1999); MP for Ghosi (Minister of State, I/C)	21 June 1991	18 January 1993	1 year, 211 days	Indian National Congress (I)	Rao	P. V. Narasimha Rao		
	N. K. P. Salve (1921–2012); Rajya Sabha MP for Maharashtra	18 January 1993	16 May 1996	3 years, 119 days	Indian National Congress (I)	Rao	P. V. Narasimha Rao		
	Atal Bihari Vajpayee (1924–2018); MP for Lucknow (Prime Minister)	16 May 1996	1 June 1996	16 days	Bharatiya Janata Party	Vajpayee I	Atal Bihari Vajpayee		
	H. D. Deve Gowda (born 1933); Rajya Sabha MP for Karnataka (Prime Minister)	1 June 1996	21 April 1997	324 days	Janata Dal	Deve Gowda	H. D. Deve Gowda		
	Inder Kumar Gujral (1919–2012); Rajya Sabha MP for Bihar (Prime Minister)	21 April 1997	9 June 1997	49 days	Janata Dal	Gujral	Inder Kumar Gujral		
	Yoginder K Alagh (1939–2022); Rajya Sabha MP for Gujarat (Minister of State, I/C)	9 June 1997	19 March 1998	283 days	Janata Dal	Gujral	Inder Kumar Gujral		
	Rangarajan Kumaramangalam (1952–2000); MP for Tiruchirappalli	19 March 1998	13 October 1999	2 years, 157 days	Bharatiya Janata Party	Vajpayee II	Atal Bihari Vajpayee		
	Rangarajan Kumaramangalam (1952–2000); MP for Tiruchirappalli	13 October 1999	23 August 2000^{[†]}	2 years, 157 days	Bharatiya Janata Party	Vajpayee III	Atal Bihari Vajpayee		
	Atal Bihari Vajpayee (1924–2018); MP for Lucknow (Prime Minister)	23 August 2000	30 September 2000	38 days	Bharatiya Janata Party	Vajpayee III	Atal Bihari Vajpayee		
	Suresh Prabhu (born 1953); MP for Rajapur	30 September 2000	24 August 2002	1 year, 328 days	Shiv Sena	Vajpayee III	Atal Bihari Vajpayee		
	Atal Bihari Vajpayee (1924–2018); MP for Lucknow (Prime Minister)	24 August 2002	26 August 2002	2 days	Bharatiya Janata Party	Vajpayee III	Atal Bihari Vajpayee		
	Anant Geete (born 1951); MP for Ratnagiri	26 August 2002	22 May 2004	1 year, 270 days	Shiv Sena	Vajpayee III	Atal Bihari Vajpayee		
	P. M. Sayeed (1941–2005); Rajya Sabha MP for NCT of Delhi	23 May 2004	18 December 2005^{[†]}	1 year, 209 days	Indian National Congress	Manmohan I	Manmohan Singh		
	Manmohan Singh (born 1932); Rajya Sabha MP for Assam (Prime Minister)	18 November 2005	29 January 2006	72 days	Indian National Congress	Manmohan I	Manmohan Singh		
	Sushilkumar Shinde (born 1941); Rajya Sabha MP for Maharashtra, until 2009; MP for Solapur, from 2009	29 January 2006	31 July 2012	6 years, 184 days	Indian National Congress	Manmohan I	Manmohan Singh		
	Veerappa Moily (born 1940); MP for Chikballapur	31 July 2012	28 October 2012	89 days	Indian National Congress		Manmohan Singh		
	Jyotiraditya Scindia (born 1971); MP for Guna (Minister of State, I/C)	28 October 2012	26 May 2014	1 year, 210 days	Indian National Congress		Manmohan Singh		
	Piyush Goyal (born 1964); Rajya Sabha MP for Maharashtra (Minister of State, I/C)	27 May 2014	3 September 2017	3 years, 99 days	Indian National Congress	Bharatiya Janata Party	Manmohan Singh	Modi I	Narendra Modi
	Raj Kumar Singh (born 1952); MP for Arrah (Minister of State, I/C until 7 Jul 2021)	3 September 2017	30 May 2019	6 years, 280 days		Bharatiya Janata Party		Modi I	Narendra Modi
	Raj Kumar Singh (born 1952); MP for Arrah (Minister of State, I/C until 7 Jul 2021)	31 May 2019	9 June 2024	6 years, 280 days	Modi II	Bharatiya Janata Party			Narendra Modi
	Manohar Lal Khattar (born 1954); MP for Karnal	10 June 2024	Incumbent	2 years, 68 days	Modi III	Bharatiya Janata Party			Narendra Modi

== Ministers of State ==
Portrait	Minister (Birth-Death) Constituency	Term of office			Political party	Ministry	Prime Minister
Portrait	Minister (Birth-Death) Constituency	From	To	Period	Political party	Ministry	Prime Minister
Minister of State for Irrigation and Power
	O. V. Alagesan (1911–1992); MP for Chengalpattu	8 May 1962	19 July 1963	1 year, 72 days	Indian National Congress	Nehru IV	Jawaharlal Nehru
	Kanuri Lakshmana Rao (1902–1986); MP for Vijayawada	9 June 1964	19 July 1964	40 days	Indian National Congress	Shastri	Lal Bahadur Shastri
	Kanuri Lakshmana Rao (1902–1986); MP for Vijayawada	24 January 1966	13 November 1966	293 days	Indian National Congress	Indira I	Indira Gandhi
Minister of State for Energy
	Fazlur Rahman; MP for Bettiah	14 August 1977	26 January 1979	1 year, 165 days	Janata Party	Desai	Morarji Desai
	Janeshwar Mishra (1933–2010); MP for Prayagraj	26 January 1979	15 July 1979	170 days	Janata Party	Desai	Morarji Desai
	Vikram Chand Mahajan (1933–2016); MP for Kangra	8 June 1980	29 January 1983	2 years, 235 days	Indian National Congress	Indira IV	Indira Gandhi
	Gargi Shankar Mishra (born 1919); MP for Seoni; Minister of State, Coal	15 January 1982	2 September 1982	230 days	Indian National Congress	Indira IV	Indira Gandhi
	Chaudhary Dalbir Singh (1926–1987); MP for Sirsa	2 September 1982	29 January 1983	149 days	Indian National Congress	Indira IV	Indira Gandhi
	Chandra Pratap Narain Singh; MP for Padrauna; Minister of State, Non-Conventional Energy Sources	2 September 1982	2 February 1983	153 days	Indian National Congress	Indira IV	Indira Gandhi
	Gargi Shankar Mishra (born 1919); MP for Seoni	6 September 1982	29 January 1983	1 year, 32 days	Indian National Congress	Indira IV	Indira Gandhi
	Chaudhary Dalbir Singh (1926–1987); MP for Sirsa; Minister of State, Coal	29 January 1983	31 October 1984	1 year, 276 days	Indian National Congress	Indira IV	Indira Gandhi
	Gargi Shankar Mishra (born 1919); MP for Seoni; Minister of State, Petroleum	29 January 1983	31 October 1984	1 year, 276 days	Indian National Congress	Indira IV	Indira Gandhi
	Chandrashekhar Singh (1927–1986); MP for Banka; Minister of State, Power	29 January 1983	14 August 1983	197 days	Indian National Congress	Indira IV	Indira Gandhi
	Arif Mohammad Khan (born 1951); MP for Bahraich	7 February 1984	31 October 1984	267 days	Indian National Congress	Indira IV	Indira Gandhi
	Chaudhary Dalbir Singh (1926–1987); MP for Sirsa; Minister of State, Coal	4 November 1984	31 December 1984	57 days	Indian National Congress	Rajiv I	Rajiv Gandhi
	Gargi Shankar Mishra (born 1919); MP for Seoni; Minister of State, Petroleum	4 November 1984	31 December 1984	57 days	Indian National Congress	Rajiv I	Rajiv Gandhi
	Arif Mohammad Khan (born 1951); MP for Bahraich	12 November 1984	31 December 1984	49 days	Indian National Congress	Rajiv I	Rajiv Gandhi
	Arun Nehru (1944–2013); MP for Raebareli; Minister of State, Power	31 December 1984	25 September 1985	268 days	Indian National Congress	Rajiv II	Rajiv Gandhi
	Arif Mohammad Khan (born 1951); MP for Bahraich; Minister of State, Power	25 September 1985	26 February 1986	154 days	Indian National Congress	Rajiv II	Rajiv Gandhi
	Sushila Rohatgi (1921–2011); MP for Uttar Pradesh (Rajya Sabha); Minister of State, Power	12 May 1986	9 May 1988	1 year, 363 days	Indian National Congress	Rajiv II	Rajiv Gandhi
	Kalpnath Rai (1941–1999); MP for Ghosi; Minister of State, Power	25 June 1988	2 December 1989	1 year, 160 days	Indian National Congress	Rajiv II	Rajiv Gandhi
	C. K. Jaffer Sharief (1933–2018); MP for Bangalore North	14 February 1988	2 December 1989	1 year, 291 days	Indian National Congress	Rajiv II	Rajiv Gandhi
	Babanrao Dhakne (born 1937); MP for Beed	21 November 1990	21 June 1991	212 days	Samajwadi Janata Party (Rashtriya)	Chandra Shekhar	Chandra Shekhar
Minister of State for Power
	P. V. Rangayya Naidu (born 1933); MP for Khammam	18 January 1993	10 February 1995	2 years, 23 days	Indian National Congress	Rao	P. V. Narasimha Rao
	Urmilaben Chimanbhai Patel (1932–2016); MP for Gujarat (Rajya Sabha)	10 February 1995	16 May 1996	1 year, 96 days	Indian National Congress	Rao	P. V. Narasimha Rao
	Samudrala Venugopal Chary (born 1959); MP for Adilabad	1 June 1996	9 June 1997	1 year, 8 days	Telugu Desam Party	Deve Gowda	H. D. Deve Gowda
	Samudrala Venugopal Chary (born 1959); MP for Adilabad	1 June 1996	9 June 1997	1 year, 8 days	Telugu Desam Party	Gujral	Inder Kumar Gujral
	Jayawantiben Mehta (1938–2016); MP for Mumbai South	13 October 1999	22 May 2004	4 years, 222 days	Bharatiya Janata Party	Vajpayee III	Atal Bihari Vajpayee
	Jairam Ramesh (born 1954); MP for Andhra Pradesh (Rajya Sabha)	6 April 2008	25 February 2009	325 days	Indian National Congress	Manmohan I	Manmohan Singh
	Bharatsinh Solanki (born 1953); MP for Anand	28 May 2009	19 January 2011	1 year, 236 days	Indian National Congress	Manmohan II	Manmohan Singh
	K. C. Venugopal (born 1963); MP for Alappuzha	19 January 2011	28 October 2012	1 year, 283 days	Indian National Congress	Manmohan II	Manmohan Singh
	Krishan Pal Gurjar (born 1957); MP for Faridabad	7 July 2021	9 June 2024	2 years, 338 days	Bharatiya Janata Party	Modi II	Narendra Modi
	Shripad Naik (born 1952); MP for North Goa	10 June 2024	Incumbent	2 years, 67 days	Bharatiya Janata Party	Modi III	Narendra Modi
