= Charanjit Chanana =

Indian politician

Minister of State for Industry, Steel and Mines
- In office 1980–1984
- Prime Minister: Indira Gandhi

Member of Rajya Sabha
- In office 3 April 1976 – 2 April 1982

President of the National Productivity Council
- Incumbent
- Assumed office 1980

Personal details
- Party: Indian National Congress
- Occupation: Politician

Charanjit Chanana was an Indian politician affiliated with the Indian National Congress. He served as the Minister of State for Industry, Steel and Mines in the Third Indira Gandhi Ministry. He served as a member of the Rajya Sabha, the upper house of the Indian parliament, from 3 April 1976, to 2 April 1982. He was also known to have been a close friend of Sanjay Gandhi.

He had also served as the as President of the National Productivity Council.
