= Kumudben Joshi =

Indian politician (1934–2022)

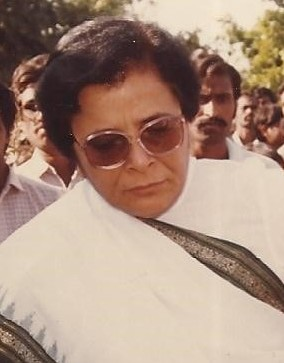

Member of Parliament Rajya Sabha
- In office 15 October 1973 – 25 November 1985
- Succeeded by: Sagar Rayka
- Constituency: Gujarat

14th Governor of Andhra Pradesh
- In office 26 November 1985 – 7 February 1990
- Preceded by: Shankar Dayal Sharma
- Succeeded by: Krishan Kant

Deputy Minister of Information and Broadcasting Government of India
- In office October 1980 – January 1982
- Prime Minister: Indira Gandhi
- Succeeded by: Mallikarjun Goud; Arif Mohammad Khan

Deputy Minister of Health and Family Welfare Government of India
- In office January 1982 – December 1984
- Prime Minister: Indira Gandhi

Personal details
- Born: Kumudben Manishankar Joshi; 31 January 1934 British Raj
- Died: 14 March 2022 (aged 88) Changa Dhanori, Navsari district, Gujarat, India
- Party: Indian National Congress

Kumudben Manishankar Joshi (31 January 1934 – 14 March 2022) was an Indian politician and Deputy Minister in Government of India headed by Indira Gandhi.

== Biography ==
She was the Governor of the Indian state of Andhra Pradesh from 26 November 1985 to 7 February 1990. She was the second female Governor of the state after Sharda Mukherjee. She also became Deputy Minister of Information and Broadcasting (October 1980 – January 1982) and Deputy Minister of Health and Family Welfare (January 1982 – December 1984).

Joshi was a member of the Rajya Sabha thrice, from 15 October 1973 to 2 April 1976, 3 April 1976 to 2 April 1982 and from 3 April 1982 to 25 November 1985. She was also the General Secretary, Gujarat P.C.C.

Soon after taking charge, she travelled to all the state's 23 districts and often outside, to create a record of sorts - that of being more active than her 13 predecessors in Hyderabad's Raj Bhavan. Between 26 November 1985 and 30 September 1987 she travelled to the districts on 108 occasions, and outside the state 22 times. N. T. Rama Rao, the then Chief Minister and his partymen saw this as an attempt by Joshi to build a stronger base for the Congress.

== Controversies ==
Joshi reacted by granting a number of interviews to local newspapers in Hyderabad. She dismissed the charges as "rubbish" and said, "it is below my dignity to reply to such criticism."

== Death ==
She died in Changa Dhanori village near Gandevi, on 14 March 2022, at the age of 88.
