= Ram Nagina Mishra =

Indian politician

Pt. Shri Ram Nagina Mishra was a former member of Lok Sabha and a leader of Bharatiya Janata Party. He was elected to Lok Sabha for six terms and four consecutive terms from Padrauna in Uttar Pradesh state in India. He had been active in sugarcane cooperatives and involved in activities related to the welfare of sugarcane farmers. He died on 16 December 2021.
