= National Productivity Council =

Indian government organization

- National Productivity Council
- Nickname: NPC
- Formation: 1958; 63 years ago
- Type: Central Government, DPIIT, under Ministry of Commerce and Industry (Autonomous)
- Purpose: Contribute to the sustainable, inclusive socioeconomic development of the country by enhancing productivity.
- Headquarters: New Delhi, India
- Key people: Sh. Piyush Goyal (President) Sh. Amardeep Singh Bhatia, IAS, Secretary DPIIT & Chairman Smt. Neerja Sekhar, IAS (Director General)
- Website: https://www.npcindia.gov.in

The National Productivity Council (NPC) was established in 1958 as an autonomous organization under Department for Promotion of Industry & Internal Trade, Ministry of Commerce and Industry (India), Government of India. There are 13 regional offices and one training institute.

124 full-time professional/consultants work at headquarter in New Delhi. Shri Piyush Goyal is current president, Shri Arun Kumar Jha is Director General of National Productivity Council India. In addition to conducting productivity research, NPC has provided consulting and training services to the government, public and private sector organizations in areas such as Industrial Engineering, Agri-Business, Economic Services, Quality Management, Human Resources Management, Information Technology, Technology Management, Energy Management, Environment Management, and others.

The National Productivity Council's headquarters has become the first government building in Delhi to have HT-solar panels installed to fulfil a portion of its electricity needs.

== History ==
On date 12 February 1958 National Productivity Council was Registered under Societies Registration Act XXI, 1860. Registered office of the Society was located at “Utpadakta Bhavan” 5–6, Institutional Area, Lodi Road, New Delhi-110 003, in the National Capital Region of Delhi.

NPC is a constituent of the Tokyo-based Asian Productivity Organization (APO), an Inter-Governmental Body, The Government of India is a founder member. The National Productivity Council has been accredited by the Quality Council of India's National Accreditation Board for Certification Body to ISO 17020:2012.

== Collaborations ==
16 Mar 2021, PTC India Limited has signed a memorandum of understanding (MoU) with National Productivity Council (NPC).

5 Oct 2020, memorandum of understanding (MoU) was signed between National Productivity Council and CSIR-National Institute of Oceanography, India.

20 July 2020, National Productivity Council under the Ministry of Commerce and Industry has tied up with Dr. Sanjay Chugh, Senior Consultant Psychiatrist to do webinar for dealing with mental stress during the pandemics.

18 June 2019, The North Eastern Council (NEC) and National Productivity Council (NPC) have agreed to work together in the areas of capacity building and project evaluation.

3 Nov 2015, Danfoss Industries signed a memorandum of understanding (MoU) with National Productivity Council.

24 Nov 2014, National Productivity Council launches scheme to curb energy wastage. On Monday held a meeting regarding enhancement of competitiveness at industrial units in Ludhiana by decreasing energy wastage.
