= Jagdish Narain Singh =

- Rai Bahadur of Jagdishgarh Estate
- Portrait of Jagdish Narain Singh

1st Rai Bahadur of Jagdishgarh Estate
- Reign: 1923 – 1941
- Predecessor: Position established
- Successor: Rudra Pratap Narain Singh
- Born: 1885; Gorakhpur, United Provinces of Agra and Oudh, British India
- Died: 13 June 1941 (aged 56); Padrauna, Gorakhpur, British India
- House: Gaharwar
- Children: 6

Jagdish Narain Singh (1885 – 13 June 1941) was born engineer, business man and the Rai Bahadur of Jagdishgarh Estate, Padrauna.

== Personal life ==
Singh was born in 1885, in Hindu rajput zamindar family of Gaharwar clan. Following the division of the Padrauna Estate, his elder brother, Raja Bahadur Braj Narain Singh ji was made Raja Bahadur of the Padrauna estate (Bade Durbar), while Singh was granted the Jagdishgarh Estate (Chhote Durbar) which extends over many districts of the United Provinces and Bihar such as Gorakhpur, Ballia, Gazipur, Azamgarh and Champaran, along with the title of Rai Bahadur in 1923. Jagdhishgarh Estate was named after him. He also served as the managing director of the Padrauna Raj Krishna Sugar Works Ltd. His ancestors were rulers of the predecessor state of Manikpur.
