= Kashi Nath Pandey =

Indian politician

Member of Parliament, Lok Sabha
- In office 1957-1971
- Succeeded by: Genda Singh
- Constituency: Padrauna, Uttar Pradesh

Personal details
- Born: Kashi Fursatpur, District-Kushinagar
- Died: Lucknow
- Party: Indian National Congress
- Spouse: Shukhraji Devi
- Children: Two

Kashi Nath Pandey is an Indian politician. He was elected to the Lok Sabha, the lower house of the Parliament of India from the Padrauna, Uttar Pradesh as a member of the Indian National Congress.
