= Yogendra Makwana =

Indian politician (1933–2025)

Yogendra Makwana (23 October 1933 – 21 October 2025) was an Indian politician who served as union minister. He was a member of Rajya Sabha from 1973 to 1988 elected from Gujarat. Makwana was born on 23 October 1933. He was also a member of the Planning Commission of India. In 2008 he founded the National Bahujan Congress, after he broke away from the Indian National Congress. Makwana died on 21 October 2025, aged 91.
