= Gargi Shankar Mishra =

Indian politician

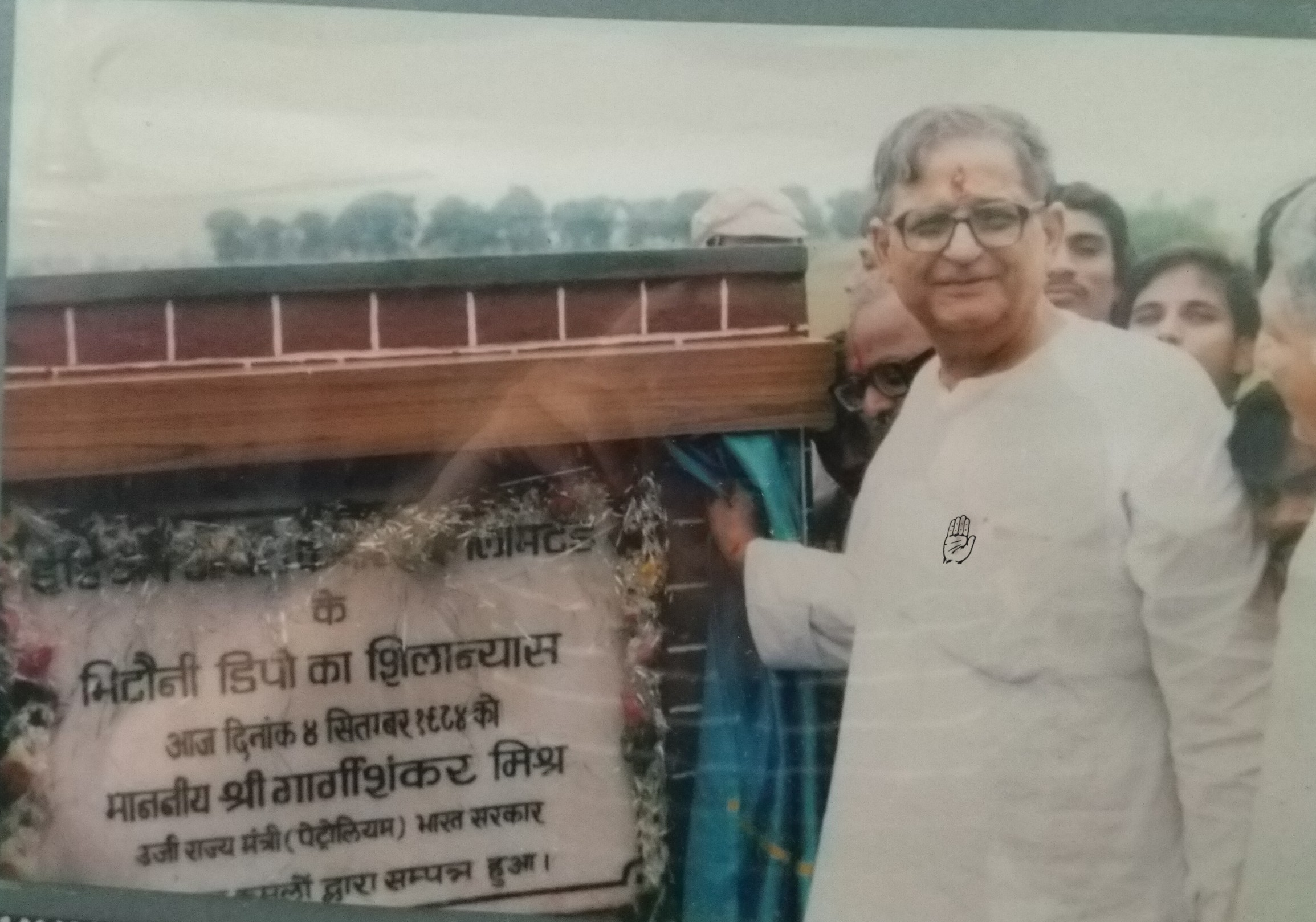

Member of Parliament, Lok Sabha
- In office 1969-1989
- Constituency: Chhindwara, Seoni

Personal details
- Born: 1 January 1919 Nagpur, Bombay Presidency, British India
- Died: 20 February 1990 (aged 71) Nagpur, Maharashtra, India
- Party: Indian National Congress

Gargi Shankar Mishra (1 January 1919 – 20 February 1990) was an Indian politician and member of the Lok Sabha. He successively represented the Madhya Pradesh constituencies of Chhindwara and Seoni.

He was also elected as member of the 4th, 5th, 6th, and 7th Lok Sabha of Indian Parliament.
