= Mallikarjun Goud =

Indian politician (1941–2002)

Dr. Mallikarjun (1941 – 24 December 2002) was a Union Minister, President of Andhra Pradesh Congress Committee, and six-term member of the Parliament of India. He was a member of 5th Lok Sabha, 6th Lok Sabha, 7th Lok Sabha, 9th Lok Sabha, 10th Lok Sabha, and 11th Lok Sabha of India.

Mallikarjun is remembered for the development of Mahbubnagar district which he represented four times as member of parliament (Lok sabha) of India, as a firebrand Telangana leader for his steadfast support of the separate Telangana state, and for sacrificing his Medak Lok sabha seat in 1980 for the election of Indira Gandhi (former Prime Minister of India) into parliament.

He was elected to Lok Sabha six times, four times from the Mahbubnagar parliamentary constituency and twice from Medak Seat. He served in the central government of India in the capacity of Union Deputy Minister and Union Minister of State handling portfolios like Defence, Railways, Education and Social Welfare, Information and Broadcasting.

== Personal details ==
Mallikarjun was born in 1941 at Nallagandla village of Medak district. He died of cardiac arrest in Hyderabad on 24 December 2002. He has two sons and one daughter.

== Political career ==
Mallikarjun entered into state politics of Andhra Pradesh with his participation and active role in the students' struggle that snowballed into Telangana agitation in 1969. He soon became a region-wide student leader for the separate statehood of Telangana agitation between 1969 and 1971. He was then elected to the Lok sabha from Medak constituency as a Telangana Praja Samithi party candidate in 1971.

He later joined the Indian National Congress party after the suppression of the fight for a Separate Telangana and was re-elected to Lok sabha in 1977 from Medak constituency. He gave up his Medak seat in 1980 for the election of former Prime minister of India, Indira Gandhi in a by-election.

He then moved to Mahbubnagar district and was elected from that parliamentary constituency four times, in 1980, 1989, 1991 and 1996, in spite of being a native of Medak district. However, he lost the election in Mahbubnagar in 1984 and 1998.

He initially was inducted into Indira Gandhi's central ministry as Deputy Minister for Railways. He also served as union minister under former prime ministers Rajiv Gandhi and P.V.Narasimha Rao, handling portfolios like Education and Social Welfare, Information and Broadcasting and Defence.

He was also the President of the Andhra Pradesh Congress Committee for two years between 1996 and 1998 and then went to form a pressure group of Telangana leaders within the congress, Congress Forum for Telangana, for the separate statehood for Telangana until his death in 2002. The last rites of Mallikarjun were held at Nallagandla village in Medak district on 25 December 2002 with State honours.
