= Mohammed Usman Arif =

Governor of Uttar Pradesh
- In office 31 March 1985 – 11 February 1990
- Preceded by: Chandeshwar Prasad Narayan Singh
- Succeeded by: B. Satya Narayan Reddy

Personal details
- Born: 5 April 1923 Bikaner, Rajasthan
- Died: 22 August 1995 (aged 72)
- Education: Dungar College; Aligarh Muslim University

Mohammed Usman Arif (5 April 1923 – 22 August 1995) was a leader of Indian National Congress. Born on 5 April 1923 in Bikaner in the Indian state of Rajasthan, he did his graduation from Dungar College, Bikaner and then completed his master's degree and LLB from Aligarh Muslim University. Later on he joined the Indian National Congress and rose to become the President of Rajasthan state unit of the party in 1980. He was elected to Rajya Sabha and was a minister in the Government of India from 1980 to 1984. He was also associated with Rajasthan State Haj Committee and Rajasthan Board of Muslim Waqfs. He was governor of Uttar Pradesh state from 31 March 1985 to 11 February 1990. He died in 1995.

== Bibliography ==
- Aqeedat ke Phool- A tribute to Mrs. Indira Gandhi
- Qalam ki Kaasht
- Nazr-e-Watan
