= Second Indira Gandhi ministry =

Indian government from 1967 to 1971

- 7th ministry of the Republic of India

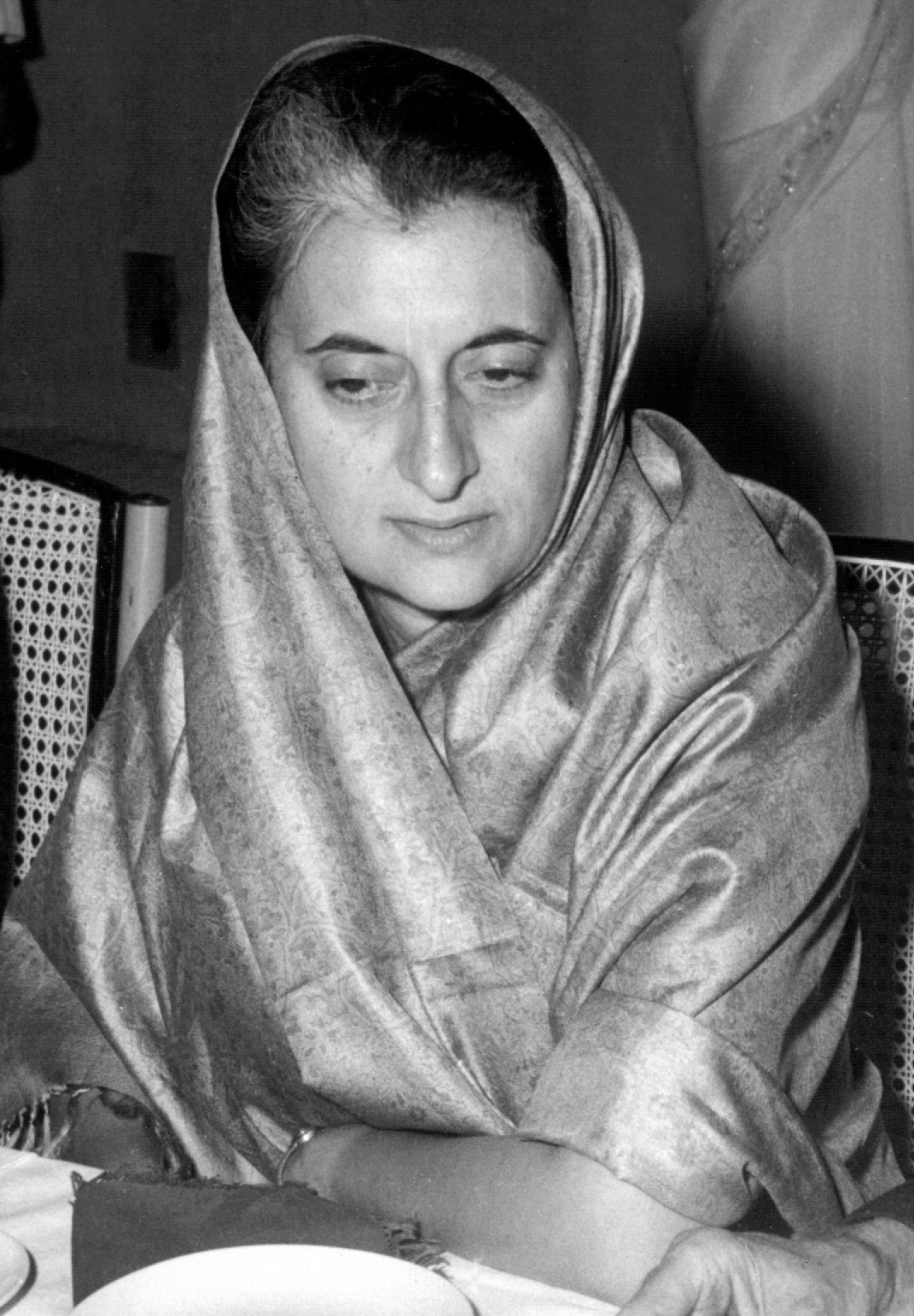
- Date formed: 13 March 1967
- Date dissolved: 18 March 1971

People and organisations
- Head of state: Sarvepalli Radhakrishnan (until 13 May 1967); Zakir Husain (13 May 1969–3 May 1969) (Note: Varahagiri Venkatagiri, Interim (3 May–20 July 1969) Mohammad Hidayatullah, Interim (20 July–24 August 1969)); Varahagiri Venkatagiri (from 24 August 1969)
- Head of government: Indira Gandhi
- Deputy head of government: Morarji Desai (until 19 July 1969)
- Member party: Indian National Congress
- Status in legislature: Majority
- Opposition party: Indian National Congress (O) (1969–1970)
- Opposition leader: Ram Subhag Singh (Lower house); M. S. Gurupadaswamy (Upper House)

History
- Election: 1967
- Outgoing election: 1971
- Predecessor: First Indira Gandhi ministry
- Successor: Third Indira Gandhi ministry

The Second Indira Gandhi ministry was the second union council of ministers which was headed by prime minister Indira Gandhi. The ministry was constituted upon the victory of the Indian National Congress under Gandhi's leadership in the 1967 general election. Prime Minister Indira Gandhi who was a member of the Rajya Sabha in her first term as the prime minister, was herself elected to the Lok Sabha in the general election from the Raebareli constituency of Uttar Pradesh.

The ministry remained in office until being dissolved and succeeded by the third Indira Gandhi ministry which was formed following the re-election of Indira Gandhi in 1971.

== Background ==
The ruling Indian National Congress party won 283 seats out of the 523 seats of the Lok Sabha and was able to form the government with a clear majority. Indira Gandhi was re-elected leader of the parliamentary party and was invited to form the government for the second time by President Sarvepalli Radhakrishnan. In her previous term, she represented the state of Uttar Pradesh in the Rajya Sabha, however in the general election, she was elected from the Raebareli constituency. She was formally appointed Prime Minister on 13 March 1967 and formed the government.

== Composition ==
Prime Minister Indira Gandhi appointed senior party leader Morarji Desai as the deputy prime minister and retained several ministers from her previous cabinet. Those re-appointed to the cabinet included M. C. Chagla, Yashwantrao Chavan, Swaran Singh, Fakhruddin Ali Ahmed, Satya Narayan Sinha, Asoka Mehta. Panampilly Govinda Menon, C. M. Poonacha, Ram Subhag Singh, Dinesh Singh, Jaisukhlal Hathi were promoted as ministers with cabinet rank.

== Ministers ==
=== Cabinet Ministers ===
Cabinet members
Portfolio	Minister	Took office	Left office	Party	Remarks
Prime Minister; Minister of Atomic Energy; And also in-charge of all other important portfolios and policy issues not allocated to any Minister.	Indira Gandhi	13 March 1967	18 March 1971	INC	
Deputy Prime Minister	Morarji Desai	13 March 1967	19 July 1969	INC	
Minister of Finance	Morarji Desai	13 March 1967	16 July 1969	INC	
Minister of Finance	Indira Gandhi	13 March 1967	27 June 1970	INC	Prime Minister was responsible.
Minister of Finance	Yashwantrao Chavan	27 June 1970	18 March 1971	INC	
Minister of External Affairs	M. C. Chagla	13 March 1967	5 September 1967	INC	
Minister of External Affairs	Indira Gandhi	5 September 1967	14 February 1969	INC	Prime Minister was responsible.
Minister of External Affairs	Dinesh Singh	14 February 1969	27 June 1970	INC	
Minister of External Affairs	Swaran Singh	27 June 1970	18 March 1971	INC	
Minister of Home Affairs	Yashwantrao Chavan	13 March 1967	27 June 1970	INC	
Minister of Home Affairs	Indira Gandhi	27 June 1970	18 March 1971	INC	Prime Minister was responsible.
Minister of Defence	Swaran Singh	13 March 1967	27 June 1970	INC	
Minister of Defence	Jagjivan Ram	27 June 1970	18 March 1971	INC	
Minister of Industrial Development and Company Affairs	Fakhruddin Ali Ahmed	13 March 1967	14 February 1969	INC	Bifurcated into Ministry of Industrial Development, Internal Trade and Company Affairs and Ministry of Foreign Trade and Supply.
Minister of Industrial Development, Internal Trade and Company Affairs	Fakhruddin Ali Ahmed	14 February 1969	27 June 1970	INC	Bifurcated into Ministry of Industrial Development and Internal Trade and the Department of Company Affairs.
Minister of Industrial Development and Internal Trade	Dinesh Singh	27 June 1970	18 March 1971	INC	
Minister of Company Affairs	K. V. Raghunatha Reddy	27 June 1970	18 March 1971	INC	Minister of State was responsible.
Minister of Foreign Trade and Supply	Bali Ram Bhagat	14 February 1969	4 November 1969	INC	Bifurcated into Ministry of Foreign Trade and Department of Supply.
Minister of Foreign Trade	Bali Ram Bhagat	4 November 1969	27 June 1970	INC	
Minister of Foreign Trade	Lalit Narayan Mishra	27 June 1970	18 March 1971	INC	Minister of State was responsible.
Minister of Supply	R. K. Khadilkar	4 November 1969	18 March 1971	INC	Minister of State was responsible.
Minister of Commerce	Dinesh Singh	13 March 1967	14 February 1969	INC	Merged into Ministry of Industrial Development, Internal Trade and Company Affairs.
Minister of Labour and Rehabilitation	Jaisukhlal Hathi	13 March 1967	15 November 1969	INC	Renamed as Ministry of Labour, Employment and Rehabilitation.
Minister of Labour, Employment and Rehabilitation	Jagjivan Ram	15 November 1969	18 February 1970	INC	
Minister of Labour, Employment and Rehabilitation	Damodaram Sanjivayya	18 February 1970	18 March 1971	INC	
Minister of Food and Agriculture	Jagjivan Ram	13 March 1967	27 June 1970	INC	
Minister of Food and Agriculture	Fakhruddin Ali Ahmed	27 June 1970	18 March 1971	INC	
Minister of Planning	Asoka Mehta	13 March 1967	5 September 1967	INC	
Minister of Planning	Indira Gandhi	5 September 1967	18 March 1971	INC	Prime Minister was responsible.
Minister of Petroleum and Chemicals	Asoka Mehta	13 March 1967	22 August 1968	INC	
Minister of Petroleum and Chemicals	Kotha Raghuramaiah	22 August 1968	14 February 1969	INC	Minister of State was responsible.
Minister of Petroleum and Chemicals	Triguna Sen	14 February 1969	18 March 1971	INC	
Minister of Social Welfare	Asoka Mehta	13 March 1967	22 August 1968	INC	Merged with Ministry of Law to form Ministry of Law and Social Welfare.
Minister of Law	Panampilly Govinda Menon	13 March 1967	22 August 1968	INC	Renamed as Ministry of Law and Social Welfare.
Minister of Law and Social Welfare	Panampilly Govinda Menon	22 August 1968	23 May 1970	INC	
Minister of Law and Social Welfare	Kengal Hanumanthaiah	26 May 1970	18 March 1971	INC	
Minister of Railways	C. M. Poonacha	13 March 1967	14 February 1969	INC	
Minister of Railways	Ram Subhag Singh	14 February 1969	4 November 1969	INC	
Minister of Railways	Panampilly Govinda Menon	4 November 1969	18 February 1970	INC	
Minister of Railways	Gulzarilal Nanda	18 February 1970	18 March 1971	INC	
Minister of Parliamentary Affairs	Ram Subhag Singh	13 March 1967	14 February 1969	INC	
Minister of Parliamentary Affairs	Kotha Raghuramaiah	14 February 1969	27 June 1970	INC	Minister of State was responsible.
Minister of Parliamentary Affairs	Kotha Raghuramaiah	27 June 1970	18 March 1971	INC	
Minister of Communications	Ram Subhag Singh	13 March 1967	14 February 1969	INC	
Minister of Communications	Satya Narayan Sinha	14 February 1969	8 March 1971	INC	
Minister of Transport and Shipping	V. K. R. V. Rao	13 March 1967	14 February 1969	INC	
Minister of Transport and Shipping	Kotha Raghuramaiah	14 February 1969	27 June 1970	INC	Minister of State was responsible.
Minister of Transport and Shipping	Kotha Raghuramaiah	27 June 1970	18 March 1971	INC	
Minister of Information and Broadcasting	Kodardas Kalidas Shah	13 March 1967	14 February 1969	INC	
Minister of Information and Broadcasting	Satya Narayan Sinha	14 February 1969	8 March 1971	INC	
Minister of Steel, Mines and Metals	Marri Chenna Reddy	16 March 1967	27 April 1968	INC	
Minister of Steel, Mines and Metals	Prakash Chandra Sethi	27 April 1968	14 February 1969	INC	Minister of State was responsible. Bifurcated into Ministry of Steel and Heavy Engineering and Ministry of Mines and Metals.
Minister of Steel and Heavy Engineering	C. M. Poonacha	14 February 1969	15 November 1969	INC	
Minister of Steel and Heavy Engineering	Swaran Singh	15 November 1969	27 June 1970	INC	
Minister of Steel and Heavy Engineering	Bali Ram Bhagat	27 June 1970	18 March 1971	INC	
Minister of Mines and Metals	Triguna Sen	14 February 1969	18 March 1971	INC	
Minister of Education	Triguna Sen	13 March 1967	14 February 1969	INC	Renamed as Ministry of Education and Youth Services.
Minister of Education and Youth Services	V. K. R. V. Rao	14 February 1969	18 March 1971	INC	
Minister of Tourism and Civil Aviation	Karan Singh	13 March 1967	18 March 1971	INC	
Minister of Health and Family Planning	Sripati Chandrasekhar	13 March 1967	14 November 1967	INC	Minister of State was responsible. Renamed as Ministry of Health, Family Planning and Urban Development.
Minister of Health, Family Planning and Urban Development	Satya Narayan Sinha	14 November 1967	14 February 1969	INC	Renamed as Ministry of Health and Family Planning.
Minister of Health and Family Planning	Kodardas Kalidas Shah	14 February 1969	18 March 1971	INC	
Minister of Works, Housing and Supply	Jagannath Rao	13 March 1967	14 February 1969	INC	Minister of State was responsible. Renamed as Ministry of Works, Housing and Urban Development.
Minister of Works, Housing and Urban Development	Kodardas Kalidas Shah	14 February 1969	18 March 1971	INC	
Minister without portfolio	Satya Narayan Sinha	13 March 1967	14 November 1967	INC	

=== Ministers of State ===
Cabinet members
Portfolio	Minister	Took office	Left office	Party	Remarks
Minister of State in the Ministry of Defence	Bali Ram Bhagat	13 March 1967	14 November 1967	INC	
Minister of State in the Ministry of Defence	Lalit Narayan Mishra (Defence Production)	14 November 1967	27 June 1970	INC	
Minister of State in the Ministry of Defence	Narendrasingh Ranjitsingh Mahida	27 June 1970	18 March 1971	INC	
Minister of State in the Ministry of Defence	Prakash Chandra Sethi (Defence Production)	27 June 1970	18 March 1971	INC	
Minister of State in the Ministry of Railways	Parimal Ghosh	13 March 1967	17 October 1969	INC	
Minister of State in the Department of Social Welfare	Phulrenu Guha	13 March 1967	14 February 1969	INC	
Minister of State in the Department of Social Welfare	Kotha Raghuramaiah	13 March 1967	14 February 1969	INC	Merged with Ministry of Law to form Ministry of Law and Social Welfare.
Minister of State in the Ministry of Law	Kotha Raghuramaiah	13 March 1967	18 March 1967	INC	Renamed as Ministry of Law and Social Welfare.
Minister of State in the Ministry of Law and Social Welfare	Phulrenu Guha	14 February 1969	26 June 1970	INC	
Minister of State in the Ministry of Law and Social Welfare	Jagannath Rao	26 June 1970	18 March 1971	INC	
Minister of State in the Ministry of Labour and Rehabilitation	Lalit Narayan Mishra	13 March 1967	14 November 1967	INC	Renamed as Ministry of Labour, Rehabilitation and Employment.
Minister of State in the Ministry of Labour, Employment and Rehabilitation	Bhagwat Jha Azad	14 February 1969	18 March 1971	INC	
Minister of State in the Ministry of Finance	K. C. Pant	13 March 1967	14 February 1969	INC	
Minister of State in the Ministry of Finance	Prakash Chandra Sethi	14 February 1969	27 June 1970	INC	
Minister of State in the Ministry of Finance	R. K. Khadilkar	7 November 1969	27 June 1970	INC	
Minister of State in the Ministry of Finance	Vidya Charan Shukla	27 June 1970	18 March 1971	INC	
Minister of State in the Ministry of Planning	Kotha Raghuramaiah	13 March 1967	5 September 1967	INC	
Minister of State in the Ministry of Petroleum and Chemicals	Kotha Raghuramaiah	13 March 1967	14 February 1969	INC	
Minister of State in the Ministry of Petroleum and Chemicals	Jagannath Rao	14 February 1969	27 June 1970	INC	
Minister of State in the Ministry of Petroleum and Chemicals	Dajisaheb Chavan	14 February 1969	18 March 1971	INC	
Minister of State in the Ministry of Petroleum and Chemicals	Nitiraj Singh	27 June 1970	18 March 1971	INC	
Minister of Irrigation and Power	Kanuri Lakshmana Rao	13 March 1967	18 March 1971	INC	
Minister of State in the Ministry of Industrial Development and Company Affairs	K. V. Raghunatha Reddy	13 March 1967	14 February 1969	INC	Bifurcated into Ministry of Industrial Development, Internal Trade and Company Affairs and Ministry of Foreign Trade and Supply.
Minister of State in the Ministry of Industrial Development, Internal Trade and Company Affairs	K. V. Raghunatha Reddy	14 February 1969	27 June 1970	INC	Bifurcated into Ministry of Industrial Development and Internal Trade and the Department of Company Affairs.
Minister of State in the Ministry of Steel, Mines and Metals	Prakash Chandra Sethi	13 March 1967	14 February 1969	INC	Bifurcated into Ministry of Steel and Heavy Engineering and Ministry of Mines and Metals.
Minister of State in the Ministry of Steel and Heavy Engineering	K. C. Pant	14 February 1969	27 June 1970	INC	
Minister of State in the Ministry of Mines and Metals	Jagannath Rao	14 February 1969	27 June 1970	INC	
Minister of State in the Ministry of Mines and Metals	Dajisaheb Chavan	14 February 1969	18 March 1971	INC	
Minister of State in the Ministry of Mines and Metals	Nitiraj Singh	27 June 1970	18 March 1971	INC	
Minister of State in the Ministry of Education	Sher Singh	13 March 1967	14 February 1969	INC	
Minister of State in the Ministry of Education	Bhagwat Jha Azad	18 March 1967	14 February 1969	INC	Renamed as Ministry of Education and Youth Services.
Minister of State in the Ministry of Education and Youth Services	Bhakt Darshan	18 February 1969	18 March 1971	INC	
Minister of State in the Ministry of Food, Agriculture, Community Development and Cooperation	Annasaheb Shinde	13 March 1967	18 March 1971	INC	
Minister of State in the Ministry of Food, Agriculture, Community Development and Cooperation	M. S. Gurupadaswamy	5 June 1967	17 October 1969	INC	
Minister of State in the Ministry of Home Affairs	Vidya Charan Shukla	13 March 1967	27 June 1970	INC	
Minister of State in the Ministry of Home Affairs	K. C. Pant	27 June 1970	18 March 1971	INC	
Minister of State in the Ministry of Home Affairs	Ram Niwas Mirdha	27 June 1970	18 March 1971	INC	
Minister of State in the Department of Parliamentary Affairs	Inder Kumar Gujral	13 March 1967	14 February 1969	INC	
Minister of State in the Department of Parliamentary Affairs	Om Mehta	30 June 1970	18 March 1971	INC	
Minister of State in the Department of Communications	Inder Kumar Gujral	13 March 1967	18 March 1971	INC	
Minister of State in the Department of Communications	Sher Singh	14 February 1969	18 March 1971	INC	
Minister of State in the Department of Atomic Energy	M. S. Gurupadaswamy	18 March 1967	5 June 1967	INC	
Minister of State in the Ministry of External Affairs	Bali Ram Bhagat	14 November 1967	14 February 1969	INC	
Minister of State in the Ministry of Health, Family Planning and Urban Development	Sripati Chandrasekhar	14 November 1967	14 February 1969	INC	Renamed as Ministry of Health and Family Planning.
Minister of State in the Ministry of Health and Family Planning	Sripati Chandrasekhar	14 February 1969	26 June 1970	INC	
Minister of State in the Ministry of Health and Family Planning	B. S. Murthy	18 February 1969	18 March 1971	INC	
Minister of State in the Ministry of Health and Family Planning	Parimal Ghosh	26 June 1970	18 March 1971	INC	
Minister of State in the Ministry of Works, Housing and Urban Development	Sripati Chandrasekhar	14 February 1969	26 June 1970	INC	
Minister of State in the Ministry of Works, Housing and Urban Development	B. S. Murthy	18 February 1969	18 March 1971	INC	
Minister of State in the Ministry of Works, Housing and Urban Development	Parimal Ghosh	26 June 1970	18 March 1971	INC	
Minister of State in the Ministry of Information and Broadcasting	Inder Kumar Gujral	14 February 1969	18 March 1971	INC	
Minister of State in the Ministry of Information and Broadcasting	Sher Singh	14 February 1969	18 March 1971	INC	
Minister of State in the Department of Electronics and Scientific and Industrial Research	K. C. Pant	2 July 1970	18 March 1971	INC	
Minister of State in the Department of Personnel in the Cabinet Secretariat	Ram Niwas Mirdha	23 August 1970	18 March 1971	INC	
Minister of State without portfolio	Nandini Satpathy	26 June 1970	18 March 1971	INC	

=== Deputy Ministers ===
Cabinet members
Portfolio	Minister	Took office	Left office	Party	Remarks
Deputy Minister in the Ministry of Transport and Shipping	Bhakt Darshan	18 March 1967	18 February 1969	INC	
Deputy Minister in the Ministry of Transport and Shipping	Iqbal Singh	14 February 1969	18 March 1971	INC	
Deputy Minister in the Department of Parliamentary Affairs	Rohanlal Chaturvedi	18 March 1967	14 November 1967	INC	
Deputy Minister in the Department of Parliamentary Affairs	J. B. Muthyal Rao	18 March 1967	14 November 1967	INC	
Deputy Minister in the Department of Parliamentary Affairs	Iqbal Singh	14 February 1969	8 June 1970	INC	
Deputy Minister in the Department of Parliamentary Affairs	Raghbir Singh Panjhazari	30 June 1970	18 March 1971	INC	
Deputy Minister in the Department of Parliamentary Affairs	Pothuraju Parthasarthy	30 June 1970	18 March 1971	INC	
Deputy Minister in the Ministry of Law	Dajisaheb Chavan	18 March 1967	14 November 1967	INC	
Deputy Minister in the Ministry of Law	Mohammad Yunus Saleem	16 November 1967	14 February 1969	INC	Renamed as Ministry of Law and Social Welfare.
Deputy Minister in the Ministry of Social Welfare	J. B. Muthyal Rao	14 November 1967	14 February 1969	INC	Merged with Ministry of Law to form Ministry of Law and Social Welfare.
Deputy Minister in the Ministry of Law and Social Welfare	Mohammad Yunus Saleem (Social Welfare)	14 February 1969	27 June 1970	INC	
Deputy Minister in the Ministry of Law and Social Welfare	J. B. Muthyal Rao	14 February 1969	17 October 1969	INC	
Deputy Minister in the Ministry of Food, Agriculture, Community Development and Cooperation	Daying Ering	18 March 1967	21 June 1970	INC	
Deputy Minister in the Ministry of Food, Agriculture, Community Development and Cooperation	Jagannath Pahadia	26 June 1970	18 March 1971	INC	
Deputy Minister in the Ministry of Food, Agriculture, Community Development and Cooperation	S. C. Jamir	27 June 1970	18 March 1971	INC	
Deputy Minister in the Ministry of Tourism and Civil Aviation	Jahanara Jaipal Singh	18 March 1967	14 February 1969	INC	
Deputy Minister in the Ministry of Tourism and Civil Aviation	Sarojini Mahishi	14 February 1969	18 March 1971	INC	
Deputy Minister in the Ministry of Railways	S. C. Jamir	18 March 1967	14 November 1967	INC	
Deputy Minister in the Ministry of Railways	Rohanlal Chaturvedi	14 November 1967	18 March 1971	INC	
Deputy Minister in the Ministry of Railways	Mohammad Yunus Saleem	27 June 1970	18 March 1971	INC	
Deputy Minister in the Ministry of Health and Family Planning	B. S. Murthy	18 March 1967	14 November 1967	INC	Renamed as Ministry of Health, Family Planning and Urban Development.
Deputy Minister in the Ministry of Health, Family Planning and Urban Development	B. S. Murthy	14 November 1967	18 February 1969	INC	
Deputy Minister in the Ministry of Commerce	Mohammad Shafi Qureshi	18 March 1967	14 February 1969	INC	Merged into Ministry of Industrial Development, Internal Trade and Company Affairs.
Deputy Minister in the Ministry of Home Affairs	K. S. Ramaswamy	18 March 1967	18 March 1971	INC	
Deputy Minister in the Ministry of Information and Broadcasting	Nandini Satpathy	18 March 1967	14 February 1969	INC	
Deputy Minister in the Ministry of Industrial Development and Company Affairs	Bhanu Prakash Singh	18 March 1967	14 February 1969	INC	Bifurcated into Ministry of Industrial Development, Internal Trade and Company Affairs and Ministry of Foreign Trade and Supply.
Deputy Minister in the Ministry of Industrial Development, Internal Trade and Company Affairs	Bhanu Prakash Singh	14 February 1969	27 June 1970	INC	Bifurcated into Ministry of Industrial Development and Internal Trade and the Department of Company Affairs.
Deputy Minister in the Ministry of Industrial Development and Internal Trade	M. R. Krishna	27 June 1970	18 March 1971	INC	
Deputy Minister in the Ministry of Foreign Trade and Supply	Ram Sewak Chowdhary	14 February 1969	4 November 1969	INC	Bifurcated into Ministry of Foreign Trade and Department of Supply.
Deputy Minister in the Ministry of Foreign Trade	Ram Sewak Chowdhary	4 November 1969	18 March 1971	INC	
Deputy Minister in the Ministry of Works, Housing and Supply	Iqbal Singh	18 March 1967	14 February 1969	INC	Renamed as Ministry of Works, Housing and Urban Development.
Deputy Minister in the Ministry of External Affairs	Surendra Pal Singh	18 March 1967	18 March 1971	INC	
Deputy Minister without portfolio	Sarojini Mahishi	18 March 1967	1 June 1967	INC	
Deputy Minister without portfolio	Nandini Satpathy	14 February 1969	26 June 1970	INC	
Deputy Minister attached to the Prime Minister	Sarojini Mahishi	1 June 1967	27 June 1970	INC	
Deputy Minister in the Ministry of Finance	Jagannath Pahadia	13 November 1967	17 October 1969	INC	
Deputy Minister in the Ministry of Finance	K. R. Ganesh	26 June 1970	18 March 1971	INC	
Deputy Minister in the Ministry of Irrigation and Power	Siddheshwar Prasad	13 November 1967	18 March 1971	INC	
Deputy Minister in the Ministry of Steel, Mines and Metals	Ram Sewak Chowdhary	13 November 1967	14 February 1969	INC	Bifurcated into Ministry of Steel and Heavy Engineering and Ministry of Mines and Metals.
Deputy Minister in the Ministry of Steel and Heavy Engineering	Mohammad Shafi Qureshi	14 February 1969	18 March 1971	INC	
Deputy Minister in the Ministry of Mines and Metals	Bhanu Prakash Singh	27 June 1970	31 August 1970	INC	
Deputy Minister in the Ministry of Labour, Employment and Rehabilitation	Dajisaheb Chavan	14 November 1967	14 February 1969	INC	
Deputy Minister in the Ministry of Labour, Employment and Rehabilitation	S. C. Jamir	14 November 1967	27 June 1970	INC	
Deputy Minister in the Ministry of Labour, Employment and Rehabilitation	Bishwanath Roy	30 June 1970	18 March 1971	INC	
Deputy Minister in the Ministry of Defence	M. R. Krishna	16 November 1967	26 June 1970	INC	
Deputy Minister in the Ministry of Petroleum and Chemicals	J. B. Muthyal Rao	17 November 1967	14 February 1969	INC	
Deputy Minister in the Ministry of Petroleum and Chemicals	Bhanu Prakash Singh	27 June 1970	31 August 1970	INC	
Deputy Minister in the Ministry of Education and Youth Services	Jahanara Jaipal Singh	14 February 1969	27 June 1970	INC	
Deputy Minister in the Ministry of Education and Youth Services	Amiya Kumar Kisku	30 June 1970	18 March 1971	INC	
Deputy Minister in the Department of Personnel in the Cabinet Secretariat	K. S. Ramaswamy	23 August 1970	18 March 1971	INC	

== See also ==
- List of Indian union ministries
