= Leader of the House in Lok Sabha =

Caucus head of the majority party in the lower house of Indian parliament

Leader of the House of Lok Sabha
- Lok Sabhā Me Sadana ke Netā
- Lok Sabha (House of the People)

- Flag of India

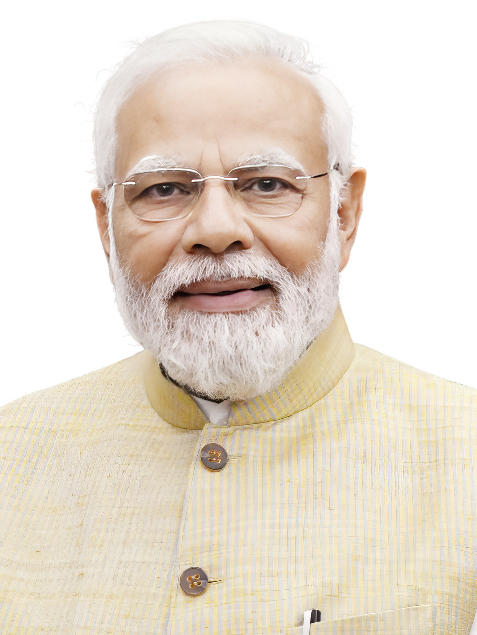
- Incumbent; Narendra Modi since 26 May 2014
- Style: The Honourable
- Type: Parliamentary Leader
- Status: Parliamentary Chairman of the Majority Party
- Abbreviation: LoH
- Member of: Lok Sabha
- Reports to: Parliament of India
- Residence: 7, Race Course Road, New Delhi
- Seat: Sansad Bhavan, New Delhi
- Nominator: MPs of the majority Parliamentary Party or alliance in the House of the People
- Appointer: Speaker of the Lok Sabha; At the pleasure of the president or confidence of parliamentary party in Lok Sabha
- Term length: by convention, based on appointee's ability to command confidence in the Lok Sabha; 5 years unless dissolved sooner (No term limits specified)
- Formation: May 1952
- First holder: Jawaharlal Nehru (1952)
- Unofficial names: Prime Minister (if the officeholder is the head of government)
- Deputy: Deputy Leader of House
- Salary: ₹330,000 (US$3,400) (excl. allowances) per month

The leader of the House in Lok Sabha (IAST: Lok Sabhā Sadana ke Netā) is the parliamentary chairperson of the party that holds a majority in the Lok Sabha, usually the prime minister, if they are a member of the house. If the prime minister is not a member of the Lok Sabha, a minister who is nominated by the prime minister serves as the leader of the house.

== History ==
Seventeen individuals had served as the leader of the house in the Lok Sabha. Of which, twelve individuals (including Gulzarilal Nanda) were prime ministers and served as the leader of the house. Jawaharlal Nehru became the first leader of the house after the 1951 general election and served as the leader of the house until his death in 1964. After his demise, acting prime minister Gulzarilal Nanda briefly served as the leader of the house. Prime Minister Lal Bahadur Shastri served as the Leader of the House, followed by acting prime minister Gulzarilal Nanda, for a second brief stint, served as the leader of the house.

Prime Minister Indira Gandhi following her appointment in 1966 was a member of the Rajya Sabha and hence appointed Parliamentary Affairs minister Satya Narayan Sinha as the leader of the house in the Lok Sabha. Following her election to the Lok Sabha in the 1967 general election, Gandhi replaced Sinha as the leader of the house. Sinha, was thus, the first leader of the house who was not the prime minister.

Prime Ministers Morarji Desai, Charan Singh, Indira Gandhi, Rajiv Gandhi, V. P. Singh, Chandrashekhar, P. V. Narasimha Rao, Atal Bihari Vajpayee also served as the leaders of the house. After the 1991 general election, newly appointed prime minister P. V. Narasimha Rao was not elected to either house of the parliament. Education Minister Arjun Singh served as the leader of the house until the election of prime minister Rao as a member of the Lok Sabha from Nandyal in a bye-election in November 1991.

Two Janata Dal prime ministers H. D. Deve Gowda and Inder Kumar Gujral were members of the Rajya Sabha, hence Railways Minister Ram Vilas Paswan, being a senior member of the cabinet, served as the leader of the house under both premiers. Similarly, Prime Minister Manmohan Singh was a member of the Rajya Sabha during his premiership from 2004 till 2014, the senior-most minister in the union cabinet Pranab Mukherjee served as the leader of the house from 2004 till his resignation from the Lok Sabha in 2012 after being elected as the President of India. He was succeeded by Home Minister Sushilkumar Shinde as the leader of the house.

The current prime minister Narendra Modi has been serving as the leader of the house since 2014.

== List of leaders of the House in Lok Sabha ==
Key

- ^{†} Assassinated or died in office

| Lok Sabha | Portrait | Name (born – died) Constituency | Term of office | | | Ministerial offices held | Political party | Government | Prime Minister | Speaker (Tenure) |
|---|---|---|---|---|---|---|---|---|---|---|
| 1st | | Jawaharlal Nehru (1889–1964); MP for Phulpur | 13 May 1952 | 4 April 1957 | 12 years, 14 days | Prime Minister; Minister of External Affairs and Commonwealth Affairs | Indian National Congress | Nehru II | Self | Ganesh Vasudev Mavalankar (1952–1956) |
| 1st | | Jawaharlal Nehru (1889–1964); MP for Phulpur | 13 May 1952 | 4 April 1957 | 12 years, 14 days | Prime Minister; Minister of External Affairs and Commonwealth Affairs | Indian National Congress | Nehru II | Self | M. A. Ayyangar (1956–1957, 1957–1962) |
| 2nd | | Jawaharlal Nehru (1889–1964); MP for Phulpur | 5 April 1957 | 31 March 1962 | 12 years, 14 days | Prime Minister; Minister of External Affairs and Commonwealth Affairs | Indian National Congress | Nehru III | Self | M. A. Ayyangar (1956–1957, 1957–1962) |
| 3rd | | Jawaharlal Nehru (1889–1964); MP for Phulpur | 2 April 1962 | 27 May 1964^{[†]} | 12 years, 14 days | Prime Minister; Minister of External Affairs and Commonwealth Affairs | Indian National Congress | Nehru IV | Self | Hukam Singh (1962–1967) |
| 3rd | | Gulzarilal Nanda (1898–1998); MP for Sabarkantha | 27 May 1964 | 9 June 1964 | 13 days | Acting Prime Minister; Minister of Home Affairs; Minister of External Affairs | Indian National Congress | Nanda I | Self | Hukam Singh (1962–1967) |
| 3rd | | Lal Bahadur Shastri (1904–1966); MP for Allahabad | 9 June 1964 | 11 January 1966^{[†]} | 1 year, 216 days | Prime Minister | Indian National Congress | Shastri | Self | Hukam Singh (1962–1967) |
| 3rd | | Gulzarilal Nanda (1898–1998); MP for Sabarkantha | 11 January 1966 | 24 January 1966 | 13 days | Acting Prime Minister; Minister of Home Affairs | Indian National Congress | Nanda II | Self | Hukam Singh (1962–1967) |
| 3rd | | Satya Narayan Sinha (Note: During this period, Prime Minister Indira Gandhi was member of Rajya Sabha.) (1900–1983); MP for Darbhanga | 14 February 1966 | 3 March 1967 | 1 year, 17 days | Minister of Parliamentary Affairs | Indian National Congress | Indira I | Indira Gandhi | Hukam Singh (1962–1967) |
| 4th | | Indira Gandhi (1917–1984); MP for Rae Bareli | 14 March 1967 | 27 December 1970 | 3 years, 288 days | Prime Minister; Minister of External Affairs (1967–1969); Minister of Finance (1970); Minister of Home Affairs (1970–1973); Minister of Defence (1975) | Indian National Congress | Indira II | Self | Neelam Sanjiva Reddy (1967–1969) |
| 4th | | Indira Gandhi (1917–1984); MP for Rae Bareli | 14 March 1967 | 27 December 1970 | 3 years, 288 days | Prime Minister; Minister of External Affairs (1967–1969); Minister of Finance (1970); Minister of Home Affairs (1970–1973); Minister of Defence (1975) | Indian National Congress | Indira III | Self | Gurdial Singh Dhillon (1969–1971, 1971–1975) |
| 5th | | Indira Gandhi (1917–1984); MP for Rae Bareli | 15 March 1971 | 18 January 1977 | 3 years, 288 days | Prime Minister; Minister of External Affairs (1967–1969); Minister of Finance (1970); Minister of Home Affairs (1970–1973); Minister of Defence (1975) | Indian National Congress | Indira III | Self | Gurdial Singh Dhillon (1969–1971, 1971–1975) |
| 5th | | Indira Gandhi (1917–1984); MP for Rae Bareli | 15 March 1971 | 18 January 1977 | 3 years, 288 days | Prime Minister; Minister of External Affairs (1967–1969); Minister of Finance (1970); Minister of Home Affairs (1970–1973); Minister of Defence (1975) | Indian National Congress | Indira III | Self | Bali Ram Bhagat (1976–1977) |
| 6th | | Morarji Desai (1896–1995); MP for Surat | 23 March 1977 | 28 July 1979 | 2 years, 127 days | Prime Minister; Minister of Finance (1977, 1979); Minister of Home Affairs (1978–1979) | Janata Party | Desai | Self | Neelam Sanjiva Reddy (1977) |
| 6th | | Morarji Desai (1896–1995); MP for Surat | 23 March 1977 | 28 July 1979 | 2 years, 127 days | Prime Minister; Minister of Finance (1977, 1979); Minister of Home Affairs (1978–1979) | Janata Party | Desai | Self | K. S. Hegde (1977–1980) |
| 6th | | Charan Singh (1902–1987); MP for Baghpat | 28 July 1979 | 22 August 1979 | 25 days | Prime Minister | Janata Party (Secular) | Charan | Self | K. S. Hegde (1977–1980) |
| 7th | | Indira Gandhi (1917–1984); MP for Medak | 10 January 1980 | 31 October 1984^{[†]} | 4 years, 295 days | Prime Minister; Minister of Defence (1980–1982); Minister of External Affairs (1984) | Indian National Congress | Indira IV | Self | Balram Jakhar (1980–1989) |
| 7th | | Rajiv Gandhi (1944–1991); MP for Amethi | 31 October 1984 | 31 December 1984 | 61 days | Prime Minister; Minister of External Affairs (1984–1985, 1987–1988); Minister of Defence (1985–1987); Minister of Finance (1987) | Indian National Congress | Rajiv | Self | Balram Jakhar (1980–1989) |
| 8th | | Rajiv Gandhi (1944–1991); MP for Amethi | 31 December 1984 | 27 November 1989 | 4 years, 331 days | Prime Minister; Minister of External Affairs (1984–1985, 1987–1988); Minister of Defence (1985–1987); Minister of Finance (1987) | Indian National Congress | Rajiv | Self | Balram Jakhar (1980–1989) |
| 9th | | Vishwanath Pratap Singh (1931–2008); MP for Fatehpur | 2 December 1989 | 10 November 1990 | 343 days | Prime Minister; Minister of Defence and Human Resource Development; Minister of External Affairs (1989) | Janata Dal | V. P. Singh | Self | Rabi Ray (1989–1991) |
| 9th | | Chandra Shekhar (1927–2007); MP for Ballia | 10 November 1990 | 13 March 1991 | 123 days | Prime Minister; Minister of External Affairs (1990) | Samajwadi Janata Party (Rashtriya) | Chandra Shekhar | Self | Rabi Ray (1989–1991) |
| 10th | | Arjun Singh (Note: Arjun Singh served as the Leader of the House in the Lok Sabha after the constitution of the 10th Lok Sabha until the election of Prime Minister P. V. Narasimha Rao as a member of the Lok Sabha in bye-election in November 1991.) (1930–2011); MP for Satna | 10 July 1991 | 20 November 1991 | 133 days | Minister of Education | Indian National Congress | Rao | P. V. Narasimha Rao | Shivraj Patil (1991–1996) |
| 10th | | P. V. Narasimha Rao (1921–2004); MP for Nandyal | 6 December 1991 | 10 May 1996 | 4 years, 156 days | Prime Minister; Minister of External Affairs (1992–1993); Minister of Defence (1993–1996); Minister of Railways (1995–1996) | Indian National Congress | Rao | Self | Shivraj Patil (1991–1996) |
| 11th | | Atal Bihari Vajpayee (1924–2018); MP for Lucknow | 16 May 1996 | 1 June 1996 | 16 days | Prime Minister; Minister of Chemicals and Fertilizers; Ministry of Textiles; Minister of Commerce and Industry | Bharatiya Janata Party | Vajpayee I | Self | P. A. Sangma (1996–1998) |
| 11th | | Ram Vilas Paswan (Note: During this period, Prime Ministers H. D. Deve Gowda and Inder Kumar Gujral were members of Rajya Sabha.) (1946–2020); MP for Hajipur | 11 June 1996 | 4 December 1997 | 1 year, 176 days | Minister of Railways; Minister of Parliamentary Affairs (1996) | Janata Dal | Deve Gowda | H. D. Deve Gowda | P. A. Sangma (1996–1998) |
| 11th | | Ram Vilas Paswan (1946–2020); MP for Hajipur | 11 June 1996 | 4 December 1997 | 1 year, 176 days | Minister of Railways; Minister of Parliamentary Affairs (1996) | Janata Dal | Gujral | Inder Kumar Gujral | P. A. Sangma (1996–1998) |
| 12th | | Atal Bihari Vajpayee (1924–2018); MP for Lucknow | 19 March 1998 | 26 April 1999 | 1 year, 38 days | Prime Minister; Minister of External Affairs (1998); Minister of Information and Broadcasting, Communications and Information Technology (1998); Minister of Non Conventional Energy Sources (1998–1999); Minister of Coal and Mines (2002); Minister of Environment and Forests (2003–2004) | Bharatiya Janata Party | Vajpayee II | Self | G. M. C. Balayogi (1998–1999, 1999–2002) |
| 13th | | Atal Bihari Vajpayee (1924–2018); MP for Lucknow | 13 October 1999 | 6 February 2004 | 4 years, 116 days | Prime Minister; Minister of External Affairs (1998); Minister of Information and Broadcasting, Communications and Information Technology (1998); Minister of Non Conventional Energy Sources (1998–1999); Minister of Coal and Mines (2002); Minister of Environment and Forests (2003–2004) | Bharatiya Janata Party | Vajpayee III | Self | G. M. C. Balayogi (1998–1999, 1999–2002) |
| 13th | | Atal Bihari Vajpayee (1924–2018); MP for Lucknow | 13 October 1999 | 6 February 2004 | 4 years, 116 days | Prime Minister; Minister of External Affairs (1998); Minister of Information and Broadcasting, Communications and Information Technology (1998); Minister of Non Conventional Energy Sources (1998–1999); Minister of Coal and Mines (2002); Minister of Environment and Forests (2003–2004) | Bharatiya Janata Party | Vajpayee III | Self | Manohar Joshi (2002–2004) |
| 14th | | Pranab Mukherjee (Note: During this period, Prime Minister Manmohan Singh was member of Rajya Sabha.) (1935–2020); MP for Jangipur | 25 May 2004 | 18 May 2009 | 4 years, 358 days | Minister of Defence (2004–2006); Minister of External Affairs (2006–2009); Minister of Finance (2009–2012) | Indian National Congress | Manmohan I | Manmohan Singh | Somnath Chatterjee (2004–2009) |
| 15th | | Pranab Mukherjee (1935–2020); MP for Jangipur | 3 June 2009 | 26 June 2012 | 3 years, 23 days | Minister of Defence (2004–2006); Minister of External Affairs (2006–2009); Minister of Finance (2009–2012) | Indian National Congress | Manmohan II | Manmohan Singh | Meira Kumar (2009–2014) |
| 15th | | Sushilkumar Shinde (Note: Sushilkumar Shinde became the Leader of the House in 2012 after the election of Pranab Mukherjee as the President of India.) (born 1941); MP for Solapur | 3 August 2012 | 18 May 2014 | 1 year, 288 days | Minister of Home Affairs | Indian National Congress | Manmohan II | Manmohan Singh | Meira Kumar (2009–2014) |
| 16th | | Narendra Modi (born 1950); MP for Varanasi | 26 May 2014 | 24 May 2019 | 12 years, 110 days | Prime Minister; Minister of Personnel, Public Grievances and Pensions; Minister of Science and Technology, Earth Sciences (2014) | Bharatiya Janata Party | Modi I | Self | Sumitra Mahajan (2014–2019) |
| 17th | | Narendra Modi (born 1950); MP for Varanasi | 30 May 2019 | 04 June 2024 | 12 years, 110 days | Prime Minister; Minister of Personnel, Public Grievances and Pensions; Minister of Science and Technology, Earth Sciences (2014) | Bharatiya Janata Party | Modi II | Self | Om Birla (2019–present) |
| 18th | | Narendra Modi (born 1950); MP for Varanasi | 04 June 2024 | Incumbent | 12 years, 110 days | Prime Minister; Minister of Personnel, Public Grievances and Pensions; Minister of Science and Technology, Earth Sciences (2014) | Bharatiya Janata Party | Modi III | Self | Om Birla (2019–present) |

=== List of deputy leaders ===
The deputy leader of the House in Lok Sabha (IAST: Lok Sabhā Sadana ke Upar Netā) is the deputy parliamentary chairperson of the party that holds a majority in the Lok Sabha and is responsible for government business in the house.

| Lok Sabha | Name (born – died) Constituency | Term of office | | | Political party | Leader of the House | Speaker (Tenure) |
|---|---|---|---|---|---|---|---|
| 14th | Meira Kumar (born 1945); MP for Sasaram | 23 May 2004 | 22 May 2009 | 4 years, 364 days | Indian National Congress | Pranab Mukherjee | Somnath Chatterjee (2004–2009) |
| 15th | Sushilkumar Shinde (born 1941); MP for Solapur | 28 May 2009 | 31 July 2012 | 3 years, 64 days | Indian National Congress | Pranab Mukherjee | Meira Kumar (2009–2014) |
| 15th | Mallikarjun Kharge (born 1941); MP for Gulbarga | 31 July 2012 | 18 May 2014 | 1 year, 291 days | Indian National Congress | Sushilkumar Shinde | Meira Kumar (2009–2014) |
| 16th | Gopinath Munde (1949–2014); MP for Beed | 26 May 2014 | 3 June 2014 | 8 days | Bharatiya Janata Party | Narendra Modi | Sumitra Mahajan (2014–2019) |
| 16th | Sushma Swaraj (1952–2019); MP for Vidisha | 4 June 2014 | 24 May 2019 | 4 years, 354 days | Bharatiya Janata Party | Narendra Modi | Sumitra Mahajan (2014–2019) |
| 17th 18th | Rajnath Singh (born 1951); MP for Lucknow | 30 May 2019 | Incumbent | 7 years, 106 days | Bharatiya Janata Party | Narendra Modi | Om Birla (2019 - present) |

== Role ==
Leader of the House in Lok Sabha is meant to lead the Lok Sabha in order to hold the Union Council of Ministers accountable to the house.

== See also ==
- Speaker of the Lok Sabha
- Deputy Speaker of the Lok Sabha
- Leader of the House in Rajya Sabha
- Leader of the Opposition in Lok Sabha
- Leader of the Opposition in Rajya Sabha
- Secretary General of the Lok Sabha

== Statistics ==
| # | Leader of House | Party | Terms | Length of term | |
| # | Leader of House | Party | Terms | Longest tenure | Total tenure |
|---|---|---|---|---|---|
| 1 | Indira Gandhi | INC | 3 | 5 years, 309 days | 14 years, 162 days |
| 2 | Jawaharlal Nehru | INC | 3 | 4 years, 360 days | 12 years, 11 days |
| 3 | Narendra Modi | BJP | 3 | 5 years, 5 days | 11 years, 327 days |
| 4 | Pranab Mukherjee | INC | 2 | 4 years, 358 days | 8 years, 16 days |
| 5 | Atal Bihari Vajpayee | BJP | 3 | 4 years, 116 days | 5 years, 170 days |
| 6 | Rajiv Gandhi | INC | 2 | 4 years, 331 days | 5 years, 27 days |
| 7 | P. V. Narasimha Rao | INC | 1 | 4 years, 156 days | 4 years, 156 days |
| 8 | Morarji Desai | JP | 1 | 2 years, 127 days | 2 years, 127 days |
| 9 | Sushilkumar Shinde | INC | 1 | 1 years, 288 days | 1 years, 288 days |
| 10 | Lal Bahadur Shastri | INC | 1 | 1 years, 216 days | 1 years, 216 days |
| 11 | Ram Vilas Paswan | JD | 1 | 1 years, 176 days | 1 years, 176 days |
| 12 | Satya Narayan Sinha | INC | 1 | 1 years, 17 days | 1 years, 17 days |
| 13 | V. P. Singh | JD | 1 | 343 days | 343 days |
| 14 | Arjun Singh | INC | 1 | 133 days | 133 days |
| 15 | Chandra Shekhar | SJP(R) | 1 | 123 days | 123 days |
| 16 | Gulzarilal Nanda | INC | 1 | 13 days | 26 days |
| 17 | Charan Singh | JP(S) | 1 | 25 days | 25 days |
