= Third Indira Gandhi ministry =

Union Council of Ministers headed by Indira Gandhi

- 8th ministry of the Republic of India

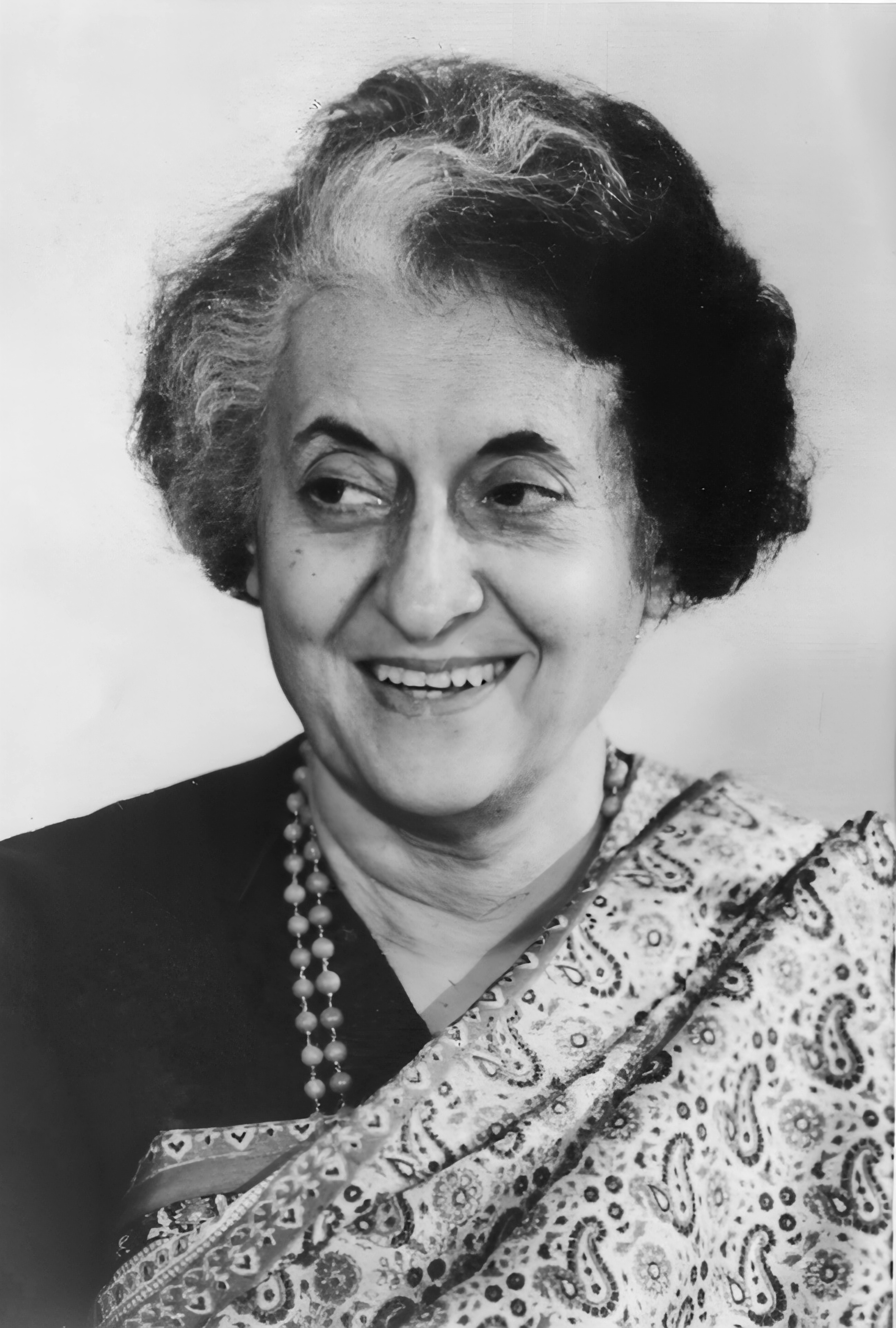
- Date formed: 18 March 1971
- Date dissolved: 24 March 1977

People and organisations
- Head of state: Varahagiri Venkata Giri (until 24 August 1974) Fakhruddin Ali Ahmed (24 August 1974 – 11 February 1977) (Note: Basappa Danappa Jatti (Interim) (from 11 February 1977))
- Head of government: Indira Gandhi
- Member party: Indian National Congress (R)
- Status in legislature: Majority
- Opposition party: Indian National Congress (Organization)
- Opposition leader: vacant (Lok Sabha); M. S. Gurupadaswamy (Rajya sabha)

History
- Election: 1971
- Outgoing election: 1977
- Legislature terms: 6 years and 8 days
- Predecessor: Second Indira Gandhi ministry
- Successor: Desai ministry

The Third Indira Gandhi ministry was formed after the 1971 election in which the Indian National Congress (R) under the leadership of Indira Gandhi emerged victorious. The ministry came into existence on 18 March 1971 and remained in effect until being dissolved on 24 March 1977 after the defeat of the Congress in the 1977 election.

== Composition ==
=== Cabinet Ministers ===
Cabinet members
Portfolio	Minister	Took office	Left office	Party	Remarks
Prime Minister; Minister of Atomic Energy; And also in-charge of all other important portfolios and policy issues not allocated to any Minister.	Indira Gandhi	18 March 1971	24 March 1977	INC(R)	
Minister of Home Affairs	Indira Gandhi	18 March 1971	5 February 1973	INC(R)	Prime Minister was responsible.
Minister of Home Affairs	Uma Shankar Dikshit	5 February 1973	10 October 1974	INC(R)	
Minister of Home Affairs	Kasu Brahmananda Reddy	10 October 1974	24 March 1977	INC(R)	
Minister of Finance	Yashwantrao Chavan	18 March 1971	10 October 1974	INC(R)	
Minister of Finance	Chidambaram Subramaniam	10 October 1974	24 March 1977	INC(R)	
Minister of Defence	Jagjivan Ram	18 March 1971	10 October 1974	INC(R)	
Minister of Defence	Swaran Singh	10 October 1974	1 December 1975	INC(R)	
Minister of Defence	Indira Gandhi	1 December 1975	21 December 1975	INC(R)	Prime Minister was responsible.
Minister of Defence	Bansi Lal	21 December 1975	24 March 1977	INC(R)	
Minister of External Affairs	Swaran Singh	18 March 1971	10 October 1974	INC(R)	
Minister of External Affairs	Yashwantrao Chavan	10 October 1974	24 March 1977	INC(R)	
Minister of Information and Broadcasting	Indira Gandhi	18 March 1971	8 November 1973	INC(R)	Prime Minister was responsible.
Minister of Information and Broadcasting	Inder Kumar Gujral	8 November 1973	28 June 1975	INC(R)	Minister of State was in-charge.
Minister of Information and Broadcasting	Vidya Charan Shukla	28 June 1975	24 March 1977	INC(R)	Minister of State was in-charge.
Minister of Planning	Indira Gandhi	18 March 1971	24 April 1971	INC(R)	Prime Minister was responsible.
Minister of Planning	Chidambaram Subramaniam	24 April 1971	22 July 1972	INC(R)	
Minister of Planning	Durga Prasad Dhar	23 July 1972	31 December 1974	INC(R)	
Minister of Planning	Indira Gandhi	2 January 1975	24 March 1977	INC(R)	Prime Minister was responsible.
Minister of Food and Agriculture	Fakhruddin Ali Ahmed	18 March 1971	2 May 1971	INC(R)	Renamed as Ministry of Agriculture.
Minister of Agriculture	Fakhruddin Ali Ahmed	2 May 1971	3 July 1974	INC(R)	
Minister of Agriculture	Chidambaram Subramaniam	3 July 1974	10 October 1974	INC(R)	Merged with Department of Irrigation to form Ministry of Agriculture and Irrigation.
Minister of Agriculture and Irrigation	Jagjivan Ram	10 October 1974	2 February 1977	INC(R)	
Minister of Railways	Kengal Hanumanthaiah	18 March 1971	22 July 1972	INC(R)	
Minister of Railways	T. A. Pai	22 July 1972	5 February 1973	INC(R)	
Minister of Railways	Lalit Narayan Mishra	5 February 1973	3 January 1975	INC(R)	
Minister of Railways	Kamalapati Tripathi	10 February 1975	24 March 1977	INC(R)	
Minister of Tourism and Civil Aviation	Karan Singh	18 March 1971	9 November 1973	INC(R)	
Minister of Tourism and Civil Aviation	Raj Bahadur	9 November 1973	22 December 1976	INC(R)	
Minister of Tourism and Civil Aviation	Kotha Raghuramaiah	23 December 1976	24 March 1977	INC(R)	
Minister of Parliamentary Affairs	Raj Bahadur	18 March 1971	5 February 1973	INC(R)	
Minister of Parliamentary Affairs	Kotha Raghuramaiah	5 February 1973	24 March 1977	INC(R)	
Minister of Transport and Shipping	Raj Bahadur	18 March 1971	8 November 1973	INC(R)	
Minister of Transport and Shipping	Kamalpati Tripathi	8 November 1973	10 February 1975	INC(R)	
Minister of Transport and Shipping	Uma Shankar Dikshit	10 February 1975	1 December 1975	INC(R)	
Minister of Transport and Shipping	Gurdial Singh Dhillon	1 December 1975	24 March 1977	INC(R)	
Minister of Industrial Development	Moinul Hoque Choudhury	18 March 1971	22 July 1972	INC(R)	
Minister of Industrial Development	Chidambaram Subramaniam	22 July 1972	10 October 1974	INC(R)	Renamed as Ministry of Industry and Civil Supplies.
Minister of Industry and Civil Supplies	T. A. Pai	10 October 1974	9 August 1976	INC(R)	Bifurcated into Ministry of Industry and Ministry of Civil Supplies and Cooperation.
Minister of Industry	T. A. Pai	9 August 1976	24 March 1977	INC(R)	
Minister of Civil Supplies and Cooperation	Syed Mir Qasim	9 August 1976	24 March 1977	INC(R)	
Minister of Heavy Industry	T. A. Pai	5 February 1973	10 October 1974	INC(R)	Merged with Ministry of Industry and Civil Supplies.
Minister of Supply	Moinul Hoque Choudhury	18 March 1971	2 May 1971	INC(R)	
Minister of Supply	Dajisaheb Chavan	2 May 1971	5 February 1973	INC(R)	Minister of State was in-charge.
Minister of Supply	Shah Nawaz Khan	5 February 1973	9 November 1973	INC(R)	Minister of State was in-charge. Merged with Department of Rehabilitation to form Ministry of Supply and Rehabilitation.
Minister of Supply and Rehabilitation	Raghunath Keshav Khadilkar	9 November 1973	1 December 1975	INC(R)	Minister of State was in-charge.
Minister of Supply and Rehabilitation	Kotha Raghuramaiah	1 December 1975	21 December 1975	INC(R)	
Minister of Supply and Rehabilitation	Ram Niwas Mirdha	21 December 1975	24 March 1977	INC(R)	Minister of State was in-charge.
Minister of Education and Social Welfare; Minister in the Department of Culture	Siddhartha Shankar Ray	18 March 1971	20 March 1972	INC(R)	
Minister of Education and Social Welfare; Minister in the Department of Culture	Saiyid Nurul Hasan	23 March 1972	24 March 1977	INC(R)	Minister of State was in-charge.
Minister of Law and Justice	H. R. Gokhale	18 March 1971	5 February 1973	INC(R)	Merged with Department of Company Affairs to form Ministry of Law, Justice and Company Affairs.
Minister of Law, Justice and Company Affairs	H. R. Gokhale	5 February 1973	24 March 1977	INC(R)	
Minister of Corporate Affairs	K. V. Raghunatha Reddy	18 March 1971	5 February 1973	INC(R)	Merged with Ministry of Law and Justice.
Minister of Steel and Heavy Engineering	Mohan Kumaramangalam	18 March 1971	2 May 1971	INC(R)	Renamed as Ministry of Steel and Mines.
Minister of Steel and Mines	Mohan Kumaramangalam	2 May 1971	31 May 1973	INC(R)	
Minister of Steel and Mines	Indira Gandhi	6 June 1973	23 July 1973	INC(R)	Prime Minister was responsible.
Minister of Steel and Mines	T. A. Pai	23 July 1973	11 January 1974	INC(R)	
Minister of Steel and Mines	Keshav Dev Malviya	11 January 1974	10 October 1974	INC(R)	
Minister of Steel and Mines	Chandrajit Yadav	10 October 1974	23 March 1977	INC(R)	Minister of State was in-charge.
Minister of Health and Family Planning	Kodardas Kalidas Shah	18 March 1971	19 May 1971	INC(R)	
Minister of Health and Family Planning	Uma Shankar Dikshit	19 May 1971	5 February 1973	INC(R)	
Minister of Health and Family Planning	Raghunath Keshav Khadilkar	5 February 1973	9 November 1973	INC(R)	Minister of State was in-charge.
Minister of Health and Family Planning	Karan Singh	9 November 1973	24 March 1977	INC(R)	
Minister of Works, Housing and Urban Development	Inder Kumar Gujral	18 March 1971	2 May 1971	INC(R)	Minister of State was in-charge. Renamed as Ministry of Works and Housing.
Minister of Works and Housing	Uma Shankar Dikshit	2 May 1971	5 February 1973	INC(R)	
Minister of Works and Housing	Bhola Paswan Shastri	5 February 1973	10 October 1974	INC(R)	
Minister of Works and Housing	Kotha Raghuramaiah	10 October 1974	23 December 1976	INC(R)	
Minister of Works and Housing	Hitendra Desai	23 December 1976	24 March 1977	INC(R)	
Minister of Foreign Trade	Lalit Narayan Mishra	18 March 1971	5 February 1973	INC(R)	Minister of State was in-charge. Merged to form Ministry of Commerce.
Minister of Commerce	D. P. Chattopadhyaya	5 February 1973	23 December 1976	INC(R)	Minister of State was in-charge.
Minister of Commerce	D. P. Chattopadhyaya	23 December 1976	24 March 1977	INC(R)	
Minister of Communications	Sher Singh	18 March 1971	2 May 1971	INC(R)	Minister of State was in-charge.
Minister of Communications	Hemwati Nandan Bahuguna	2 May 1971	8 November 1973	INC(R)	Minister of State was in-charge.
Minister of Communications	Raj Bahadur	8 November 1973	11 January 1974	INC(R)	
Minister of Communications	Kasu Brahmananda Reddy	11 January 1974	10 October 1974	INC(R)	
Minister of Communications	Shankar Dayal Sharma	10 October 1974	24 March 1977	INC(R)	
Minister of Petroleum, Chemicals and Non-Ferrous Metals	Dajisaheb Chavan	18 March 1971	2 May 1971	INC(R)	Minister of State was in-charge. Renamed as Ministry of Petroleum and Chemicals.
Minister of Petroleum and Chemicals	Prakash Chandra Sethi	2 May 1971	29 January 1972	INC(R)	Minister of State was in-charge.
Minister of Petroleum and Chemicals	H. R. Gokhale	29 January 1972	5 February 1973	INC(R)	
Minister of Petroleum and Chemicals	D. K. Barooah	5 February 1973	10 October 1974	INC(R)	
Minister of Petroleum and Chemicals	Keshav Dev Malviya	10 October 1974	21 December 1975	INC(R)	Bifurcated into Ministry of Petroleum and Ministry of Chemicals and Fertilizers.
Minister of Petroleum	Keshav Dev Malviya	21 December 1975	24 March 1977	INC(R)	
Minister of Chemicals and Fertilizers	Prakash Chandra Sethi	21 December 1975	23 December 1976	INC(R)	
Minister of Chemicals and Fertilizers	Keshav Dev Malviya	23 December 1976	24 March 1977	INC(R)	
Minister of Science and Technology	Chidambaram Subramaniam	2 May 1971	10 October 1974	INC(R)	
Minister of Science and Technology	T. A. Pai	10 October 1974	2 January 1975	INC(R)	
Minister of Science and Technology	Indira Gandhi	2 January 1975	24 March 1977	INC(R)	Prime Minister was responsible.
Minister of Electronics	Indira Gandhi	17 June 1971	24 March 1977	INC(R)	Prime Minister was responsible.
Minister of Space	Indira Gandhi	2 June 1972	24 March 1977	INC(R)	Prime Minister was responsible.
Minister without portfolio	Uma Shankar Dikshit	10 October 1974	10 February 1975	INC(R)	
Minister without portfolio	Bansi Lal	1 December 1975	21 December 1975	INC(R)	
Minister without portfolio	Syed Mir Qasim	7 June 1976	9 August 1976	INC(R)	
Minister without portfolio	Prakash Chandra Sethi	23 December 1976	24 March 1977	INC(R)	

=== Ministers of State (In-Charge) ===
Cabinet members
Portfolio	Minister	Took office	Left office	Party	Remarks
Minister of State (In-Charge) of the Ministry of Labour, Employment and Rehabilitation	Raghunath Keshav Khadilkar	18 March 1971	2 May 1971	INC(R)	Renamed as Ministry of Labour and Rehabilitation.
Minister of State (In-Charge) of the Ministry of Labour and Rehabilitation	Raghunath Keshav Khadilkar	2 May 1971	5 February 1973	INC(R)	
Minister of State (In-Charge) of the Ministry of Labour and Rehabilitation	K. V. Raghunatha Reddy	5 February 1973	9 November 1973	INC(R)	Bifurcated into Ministry of Labour and Department of Rehabilitation.
Minister of State (In-Charge) of the Ministry of Labour	K. V. Raghunatha Reddy	9 November 1973	24 March 1977	INC(R)	
Minister of State (In-Charge) of the Ministry of Irrigation and Power	Kanuri Lakshmana Rao	18 March 1971	9 November 1973	INC(R)	
Minister of State (In-Charge) of the Ministry of Irrigation and Power	K. C. Pant	9 November 1973	10 October 1974	INC(R)	Bifurcated into Department of Irrigation and Ministry of Energy.
Minister of State (In-Charge) of the Ministry of Energy	K. C. Pant	10 October 1974	24 March 1977	INC(R)	

=== Minister of State ===
Cabinet members
Portfolio	Minister	Took office	Left office	Party	Remarks
Minister of State in the Ministry of Petroleum, Chemicals and Non-Ferrous Metals	Nitiraj Singh	18 March 1971	2 May 1971	INC(R)	Renamed as Ministry of Petroleum and Chemicals.
Minister of State in the Ministry of Petroleum and Chemicals	Shah Nawaz Khan	9 November 1973	10 October 1974	INC(R)	
Minister of State in the Ministry of Petroleum and Chemicals	K. R. Ganesh	10 October 1974	1 December 1975	INC(R)	
Minister of State in the Department of Parliamentary Affairs	Om Mehta	18 March 1971	24 March 1977	INC(R)	
Minister of State in the Ministry of Home Affairs	Ram Niwas Mirdha (Personnel)	18 March 1971	10 October 1974	INC(R)	
Minister of State in the Ministry of Home Affairs	K. C. Pant	18 March 1971	9 November 1973	INC(R)	
Minister of State in the Ministry of Home Affairs	Om Mehta (Personnel and Administrative Reforms)	10 October 1974	24 March 1977	INC(R)	
Minister of State in the Department of Electronics; Minister of State in the Department of Atomic Energy	K. C. Pant	18 March 1971	24 March 1977	INC(R)	
Minister of State in the Ministry of Science and Technology	K. C. Pant	18 March 1971	2 May 1971	INC(R)	
Minister of State in the Department of Space	K. C. Pant	2 June 1972	24 March 1977	INC(R)	Prime Minister was responsible.
Minister of State in the Ministry of Information and Broadcasting	Nandini Satpathy	18 March 1971	10 October 1974	INC(R)	
Minister of State in the Ministry of Information and Broadcasting	Inder Kumar Gujral	22 July 1972	8 November 1973	INC(R)	
Minister of State in the Ministry of Food and Agriculture	Annasaheb Shinde	18 March 1971	2 May 1971	INC(R)	Renamed as Ministry of Agriculture.
Minister of State in the Ministry of Agriculture	Annasaheb Shinde	2 May 1971	10 October 1974	INC(R)	
Minister of State in the Ministry of Agriculture	Sher Singh	2 May 1971	12 January 1974	INC(R)	
Minister of State in the Ministry of Agriculture	Buddha Priya Maurya	12 January 1974	10 October 1974	INC(R)	Merged with Department of Irrigation to form Ministry of Agriculture and Irrigation.
Minister of State in the Ministry of Agriculture and Irrigation	Annasaheb Shinde	10 October 1974	24 March 1977	INC(R)	
Minister of State in the Ministry of Agriculture and Irrigation	Shah Nawaz Khan	10 October 1974	24 March 1977	INC(R)	
Minister of State in the Ministry of Defence	Prakash Chandra Sethi (Defence Production)	18 March 1971	2 May 1971	INC(R)	
Minister of State in the Ministry of Defence	Vidya Charan Shukla (Defence Production)	2 May 1971	10 October 1974	INC(R)	
Minister of State in the Ministry of Defence	Ram Niwas Mirdha (Defence Production)	10 October 1974	21 December 1975	INC(R)	
Minister of State in the Ministry of Defence	Vitthalrao Gadgil (Defence Production)	21 December 1975	24 March 1977	INC(R)	
Minister of State in the Ministry of Defence	Janaki Ballabh Patnaik	23 December 1976	24 March 1977	INC(R)	
Minister of State in the Ministry of Finance	Vidya Charan Shukla	18 March 1971	2 May 1971	INC(R)	
Minister of State in the Ministry of Finance	K. R. Ganesh	2 May 1971	10 October 1974	INC(R)	
Minister of State in the Ministry of Finance	Pranab Mukherjee	10 October 1974	21 December 1975	INC(R)	
Minister of State in the Ministry of Finance	Pranab Mukherjee (Revenue and Banking)	21 December 1975	24 March 1977	INC(R)	
Minister of State in the Ministry of Works and Housing	Inder Kumar Gujral	2 May 1971	22 July 1972	INC(R)	
Minister of State in the Ministry of Works and Housing	D. P. Chattopadhyaya	22 July 1972	5 February 1973	INC(R)	
Minister of State in the Ministry of Works and Housing	Om Mehta	5 February 1973	10 October 1974	INC(R)	
Minister of State in the Ministry of Works and Housing	Mohan Dharia	10 October 1974	2 May 1975	INC(R)	
Minister of State in the Ministry of Works and Housing	H. K. L. Bhagat	1 December 1975	24 March 1977	INC(R)	
Minister of State in the Ministry of Law and Justice	Nitiraj Singh	18 March 1971	5 February 1973	INC(R)	Merged with Department of Company Affairs to form Ministry of Law, Justice and Company Affairs.
Minister of State in the Ministry of Law, Justice and Company Affairs	Nitiraj Singh	5 February 1973	17 October 1974	INC(R)	
Minister of State in the Ministry of Law, Justice and Company Affairs	Dajisaheb Chavan	5 February 1973	8 July 1973	INC(R)	
Minister of State in the Ministry of Law, Justice and Company Affairs	Sarojini Mahishi	10 October 1974	3 January 1976	INC(R)	
Minister of State in the Ministry of Law, Justice and Company Affairs	V. A. Seyid Muhammad	25 December 1975	24 March 1977	INC(R)	
Minister of State in the Ministry of Transport and Shipping	Om Mehta	2 May 1971	5 February 1973	INC(R)	
Minister of State in the Ministry of Transport and Shipping	Mansinhji Bhasaheb Rana	5 February 1973	11 January 1974	INC(R)	
Minister of State in the Ministry of Transport and Shipping	H. M. Trivedi	17 October 1974	24 March 1977	INC(R)	
Minister of State in the Ministry of Tourism and Civil Aviation	Sarojini Mahishi	2 May 1971	9 November 1973	INC(R)	
Minister of State in the Ministry of Tourism and Civil Aviation	Surendra Pal Singh	10 October 1974	23 December 1976	INC(R)	
Minister of State in the Ministry of Steel and Mines	Shah Nawaz Khan	2 May 1971	5 February 1973	INC(R)	
Minister of State in the Ministry of Health and Family Planning	D. P. Chattopadhyaya	2 May 1971	5 February 1973	INC(R)	
Minister of State in the Ministry of Health and Family Planning	Ram Sewak Chowdhary	1 December 1975	24 March 1977	INC(R)	
Minister of State in the Ministry of Industrial Development	Ghanshyam Oza	2 May 1971	17 March 1972	INC(R)	
Minister of State in the Ministry of Industrial Development	Mansinhji Bhasaheb Rana	11 January 1974	31 July 1974	INC(R)	Renamed as Ministry of Industry and Civil Supplies.
Minister of State in the Ministry of Industry and Civil Supplies	Buddha Priya Maurya	10 October 1974	9 August 1976	INC(R)	
Minister of State in the Ministry of Industry and Civil Supplies	A. C. George	10 October 1974	9 August 1976	INC(R)	
Minister of State in the Ministry of Industry and Civil Supplies	Anant Prasad Sharma	10 October 1974	9 August 1976	INC(R)	Bifurcated into Ministry of Industry and Ministry of Civil Supplies and Cooperation.
Minister of State in the Ministry of Industry	Buddha Priya Maurya	9 August 1976	24 March 1977	INC(R)	
Minister of State in the Ministry of Industry	Anant Prasad Sharma	9 August 1976	24 March 1977	INC(R)	
Minister of State in the Ministry of Civil Supplies and Cooperation	A. C. George	9 August 1976	24 March 1977	INC(R)	
Minister of State in the Ministry of Planning	Mohan Dharia	2 May 1971	10 October 1974	INC(R)	
Minister of State in the Ministry of Planning	Vidya Charan Shukla	10 October 1974	28 May 1975	INC(R)	
Minister of State in the Ministry of Planning	Inder Kumar Gujral	28 May 1975	12 May 1976	INC(R)	
Minister of State in the Ministry of Planning	Sanker Ghose	21 April 1976	24 March 1977	INC(R)	
Minister of State in the Ministry of Education and Social Welfare; Minister of State in the Department of Culture	Saiyid Nurul Hasan	4 October 1971	24 March 1972	INC(R)	
Minister of State in the Ministry of External Affairs	Surendra Pal Singh	5 February 1973	10 October 1974	INC(R)	
Minister of State in the Ministry of Communications	Sher Singh	12 January 1974	10 October 1974	INC(R)	
Minister of State in the Ministry of Railways	Mohammad Shafi Qureshi	10 October 1974	24 March 1977	INC(R)	
Minister of State in the Ministry of Railways	Surendra Pal Singh	23 December 1976	24 March 1977	INC(R)	
Minister of State in the Ministry of Commerce	Vishwanath Pratap Singh	23 December 1976	24 March 1977	INC(R)	

=== Deputy Ministers ===
Cabinet members
Portfolio	Minister	Took office	Left office	Party	Remarks
Deputy Minister in the Ministry of Finance	K. R. Ganesh	18 March 1971	2 May 1971	INC(R)	
Deputy Minister in the Ministry of Finance	Sushila Rohatgi	2 May 1971	24 March 1977	INC(R)	
Deputy Minister in the Ministry of Health and Family Planning	Amiya Kumar Kisku	18 March 1971	10 October 1974	INC(R)	
Deputy Minister in the Ministry of Health and Family Planning	Kondajji Basappa	5 February 1973	10 October 1974	INC(R)	
Deputy Minister in the Ministry of Health and Family Planning	A. K. M. Ishaque	10 October 1974	24 March 1977	INC(R)	
Deputy Minister in the Ministry of Tourism and Civil Aviation	Sarojini Mahishi	18 March 1971	2 May 1971	INC(R)	
Deputy Minister in the Ministry of Tourism and Civil Aviation	Virbhadra Singh	31 December 1976	24 March 1977	INC(R)	
Deputy Minister in the Ministry of Supply	Jagannath Pahadia	18 March 1971	2 May 1971	INC(R)	Merged with Department of Rehabilitation to form Ministry of Supply and Rehabilitation.
Deputy Minister in the Ministry of Supply and Rehabilitation	Gaddam Venkatswamy	9 November 1973	24 March 1977	INC(R)	
Deputy Minister in the Ministry of Steel and Heavy Engineering	Mohammad Shafi Qureshi	18 March 1971	2 May 1971	INC(R)	Renamed as Ministry of Steel and Mines.
Deputy Minister in the Ministry of Steel and Mines	Sukhdev Prasad	5 February 1973	24 March 1977	INC(R)	
Deputy Minister in the Ministry of Steel and Mines	Subodh Chandra Hansda	6 February 1973	10 October 1974	INC(R)	
Deputy Minister in the Ministry of Home Affairs	K. S. Ramaswamy	18 March 1971	2 May 1971	INC(R)	
Deputy Minister in the Ministry of Home Affairs	Fakruddinsab Hussensab Mohsin	2 May 1971	24 March 1977	INC(R)	
Deputy Minister in the Ministry of Irrigation and Power	Siddheshwar Prasad	18 March 1971	2 May 1971	INC(R)	
Deputy Minister in the Ministry of Irrigation and Power	Baijnath Kureel	2 May 1971	4 February 1973	INC(R)	
Deputy Minister in the Ministry of Irrigation and Power	Balgovind Verma	5 February 1973	9 November 1973	INC(R)	
Deputy Minister in the Ministry of Irrigation and Power	Siddheshwar Prasad	9 November 1973	10 October 1974	INC(R)	Bifurcated into Department of Irrigation and Ministry of Energy.
Deputy Minister in the Ministry of Energy	Siddheshwar Prasad	10 October 1974	24 March 1977	INC(R)	
Deputy Minister in the Ministry of External Affairs	Surendra Pal Singh	18 March 1971	5 February 1973	INC(R)	
Deputy Minister in the Ministry of External Affairs	Bipinpal Das	17 October 1974	24 March 1977	INC(R)	
Deputy Minister in the Ministry of Agriculture	Jagannath Pahadia	2 May 1971	22 July 1972	INC(R)	Merged with Department of Irrigation to form Ministry of Agriculture and Irrigation.
Deputy Minister in the Ministry of Agriculture and Irrigation	Kedar Nath Singh	10 October 1974	24 March 1977	INC(R)	
Deputy Minister in the Ministry of Agriculture and Irrigation	Prabhudas Patel	23 October 1974	14 March 1977	INC(R)	
Deputy Minister in the Ministry of Railways	Mohammad Shafi Qureshi	2 May 1971	10 October 1974	INC(R)	
Deputy Minister in the Ministry of Railways	Buta Singh	10 October 1974	23 December 1976	INC(R)	
Deputy Minister in the Ministry of Education and Social Welfare	K. S. Ramaswamy	2 May 1971	11 November 1972	INC(R)	
Deputy Minister in the Ministry of Education and Social Welfare	Deonandan Prasad Yadav	2 May 1971	24 March 1977	INC(R)	
Deputy Minister in the Ministry of Education and Social Welfare	Arvind Netam	5 February 1973	24 March 1977	INC(R)	
Deputy Minister in the Department of Culture	Deonandan Prasad Yadav	28 May 1971	24 March 1977	INC(R)	
Deputy Minister in the Department of Culture	Arvind Netam	5 February 1973	24 March 1977	INC(R)	
Deputy Minister in the Ministry of Industrial Development	Siddheshwar Prasad	2 May 1971	5 February 1973	INC(R)	
Deputy Minister in the Ministry of Industrial Development	Pranab Mukherjee	5 February 1973	11 January 1974	INC(R)	
Deputy Minister in the Ministry of Industrial Development	Ziaur Rahman Ansari	6 February 1973	10 October 1974	INC(R)	Renamed as Ministry of Industry and Civil Supplies.
Deputy Minister in the Ministry of Industry and Civil Supplies	Ziaur Rahman Ansari	10 October 1974	3 January 1976	INC(R)	Bifurcated into Ministry of Industry and Ministry of Civil Supplies and Cooperation.
Deputy Minister in the Ministry of Heavy Industry	Siddheshwar Prasad	5 February 1973	9 November 1973	INC(R)	
Deputy Minister in the Ministry of Heavy Industry	Chaudhary Dalbir Singh	9 November 1973	10 October 1974	INC(R)	Merged with Ministry of Industry and Civil Supplies.
Deputy Minister in the Department of Parliamentary Affairs	B. Shankaranand	2 May 1971	24 March 1977	INC(R)	
Deputy Minister in the Department of Parliamentary Affairs	Kedar Nath Singh	2 May 1971	10 October 1974	INC(R)	
Deputy Minister in the Ministry of Company Affairs	Bedabrata Barua	2 May 1971	5 February 1973	INC(R)	Merged with Ministry of Law and Justice to form Ministry of Law, Justice and Company Affairs.
Deputy Minister in the Ministry of Law, Justice and Company Affairs	Bedabrata Barua	5 February 1973	24 March 1977	INC(R)	
Deputy Minister in the Ministry of Labour and Rehabilitation	Balgovind Verma	2 May 1971	5 February 1973	INC(R)	
Deputy Minister in the Ministry of Labour and Rehabilitation	Gaddam Venkatswamy	5 February 1973	9 November 1973	INC(R)	Bifurcated into Ministry of Labour and Department of Rehabilitation.
Deputy Minister in the Ministry of Labour	Balgovind Verma	9 November 1973	26 December 1976	INC(R)	
Deputy Minister in the Ministry of Labour	Jagannath Pahadia	26 December 1976	24 March 1977	INC(R)	
Deputy Minister in the Ministry of Petroleum and Chemicals	Chaudhary Dalbir Singh	2 May 1971	9 November 1973	INC(R)	
Deputy Minister in the Ministry of Petroleum and Chemicals	C. P. Majhi	17 October 1974	25 December 1975	INC(R)	Bifurcated into Ministry of Petroleum and Ministry of Chemicals and Fertilizers.
Deputy Minister in the Ministry of Petroleum	Ziaur Rahman Ansari	21 December 1975	24 March 1977	INC(R)	
Deputy Minister in the Ministry of Chemicals and Fertilizers	C. P. Majhi	21 December 1975	24 March 1977	INC(R)	
Deputy Minister in the Ministry of Information and Broadcasting	Dharam Bir Sinha	2 May 1971	24 March 1977	INC(R)	
Deputy Minister in the Ministry of Foreign Trade	A. C. George	2 May 1971	5 February 1973	INC(R)	Merged to form Ministry of Commerce.
Deputy Minister in the Ministry of Commerce	Vishwanath Pratap Singh	5 February 1973	23 December 1976	INC(R)	
Deputy Minister in the Ministry of Commerce	Buta Singh	23 December 1976	24 March 1977	INC(R)	
Deputy Minister in the Ministry of Communications	Jagannath Pahadia	22 July 1972	23 December 1976	INC(R)	
Deputy Minister in the Ministry of Communications	Balgovind Verma	23 December 1976	24 March 1977	INC(R)	
Deputy Minister in the Ministry of Defence	Janaki Ballabh Patnaik	5 February 1973	26 December 1976	INC(R)	
Deputy Minister in the Ministry of Transport and Shipping	Pranab Mukherjee	11 January 1974	10 October 1974	INC(R)	
Deputy Minister in the Ministry of Transport and Shipping	Chaudhary Dalbir Singh	1 December 1975	24 March 1977	INC(R)	
Deputy Minister in the Ministry of Works and Housing	Chaudhary Dalbir Singh	10 October 1974	1 December 1975	INC(R)	
Deputy Minister in the Ministry of Tourism and Civil Aviation	Virbhadra Singh	31 December 1976	24 March 1977	INC(R)	

== See also ==
- List of Indian union ministries
