= Ministry of Information and Broadcasting (India) =

Government ministry of India

- Branch of Government of India

- Ministry of Information and Broadcasting

Agency overview
- Formed: 15 August 1947; 79 years ago
- Jurisdiction: Government of India
- Headquarters: Kartavya Bhavan-02 Janpath, New Delhi
- Employees: 4,012 (2016 est.)
- Annual budget: ₹4,551.94 crore (US$490 million) (2026–27)
- Minister responsible: Ashwini Vaishnaw, Minister of Information and Broadcasting
- Agency executive: Chanchal Kumar, IAS, Information and Broadcasting Secretary
- Website: www.mib.gov.in

The Ministry of Information and Broadcasting is a ministry of the Government of India. It is responsible for the formulation and administration of rules, regulations and laws in the areas of information, broadcasting, the press, and the cinema of India.

The Ministry is responsible for the administration of the Press Information Bureau and Prasar Bharati, the broadcasting arm of the Indian Government. The Central Board of Film Certification is the other important statutory body subordinate to this ministry, responsible for the regulation and certification of motion pictures broadcast in India.

== Organisation ==
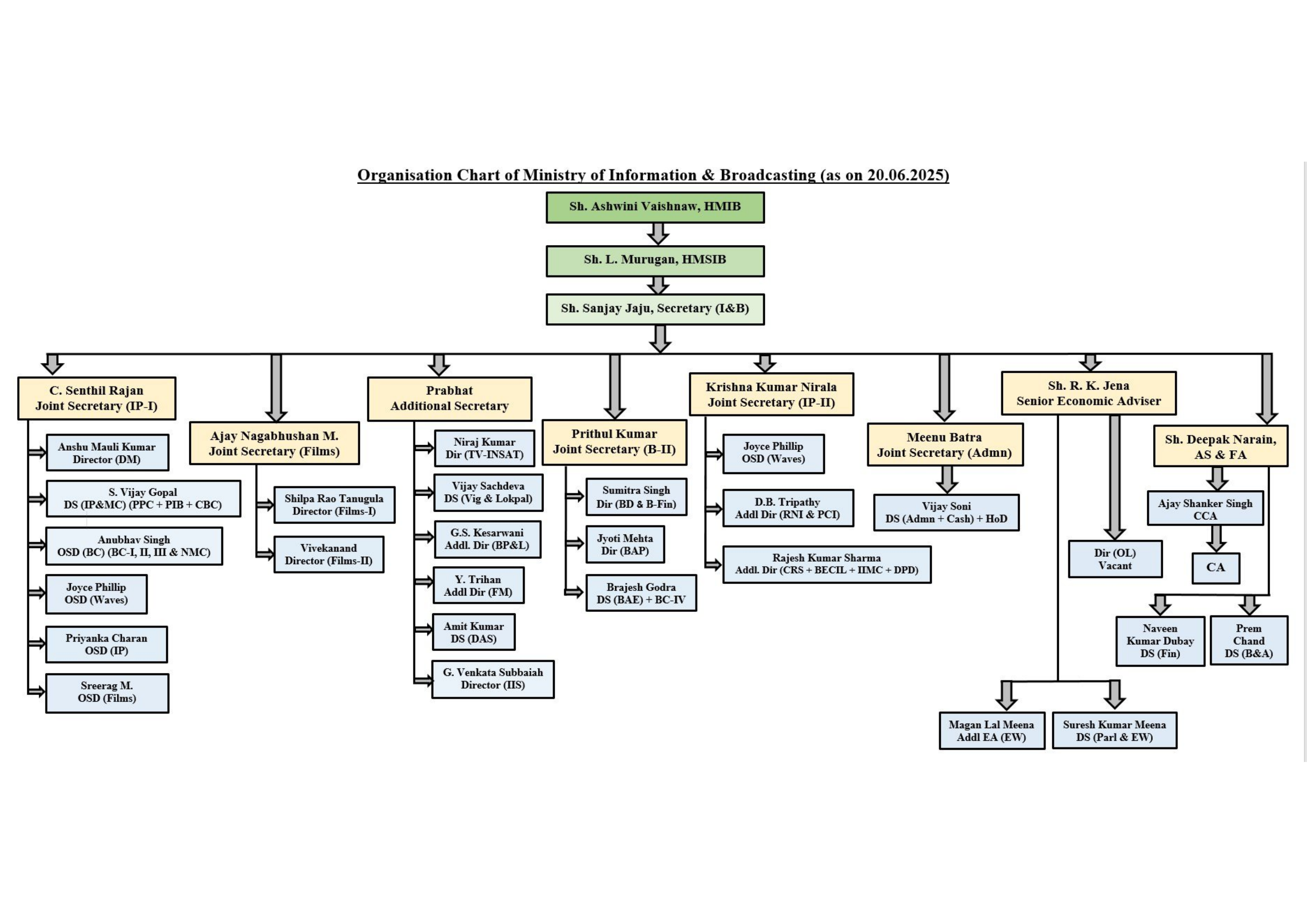
Official organisation chart of the Ministry of Information and Broadcasting (as on 20 June 2025)

The Ministry of Information and Broadcasting is structured into various departments and divisions, each responsible for distinct aspects of media regulation, public broadcasting, film certification, and communication strategy. As of 20 June 2025, the official organisational chart outlines the roles of the Minister, Secretary, Joint Secretaries, Directors, and other senior officials overseeing functions such as print media, films, digital communication, and administration.

=== Wings and Divisions ===
- Broadcasting Wing
- Information Wing
- Films Wing
- Digital Media Division

=== Organisations under the wings ===
- Broadcasting Wing
  - Conditional Access System (CAS)
  - Community Radio Stations
  - Prasar Bharati
    - Doordarshan
    - Akashvani
  - Broadcast Engineering Consultants India Limited
  - Uplinking / Downlinking of TV Channels
  - Content Regulation on Private TV Channels
  - Direct to Home (DTH)
  - Internet Protocol Television (IPTV)
  - Headend-in-the-Sky (HITS)
  - Digital television transition
  - Radio And Television Licence Around The World
- Information Wing
  - Press Information Bureau (PIB)
  - Photo Division
  - Publications Division
  - Research Reference and Training Division
  - Press Council of India
  - Indian Institute of Mass Communication (IIMC)
  - Press Registrar General of India
  - Directorate of Publication Division(DPD)
  - New Media Wing
  - Electronic Media Monitoring Centre (EMMC)
- Films Wing
  - Central Board of Film Certification
  - Film and Television Institute of India, Pune (FTII)
  - Film Certification Appellate Tribunal
  - Satyajit Ray Film and Television Institute (SRFTI)
  - National Film Development Corporation
- Digital Media Division
  - This division deals with the part 3 of Information Technology (Intermediary Guidelines and Digital Media Ethics Code) Rules, 2021 which mainly regulates the publication of news and media content on the internet and the publishers of OTT Platforms.

== Mandate ==
The mandate of the Ministry of Information and Broadcasting are:

- News services—both televised and broadcast through All India Radio (AIR) and Doordarshan (DD)
- Development of broadcasting and television
- Import and export of films
- Development and promotion of film industry
- Promotion and organisation of film festivals and cultural exchanges
- Manage press relations to effectively communicate the policies of the Government of India and gather feedback on these policies
- Administration of the Press and Registration of Books Act, 1867 with respect to newspapers
- Dissemination of information about India within and outside the country through publications on matters of national importance
- Provide research, references, and training to support the media units of the Ministry in fulfilling their responsibilities
- Utilise interpersonal communication and traditional folk art forms to promote information and raise awareness on public interest issues through publicity campaigns
- Foster international cooperation in the areas of information and mass media

== Civil service ==
The Indian Information Service (IIS) is a distinguished Group 'A' Civil Service open to candidates who successfully complete the UPSC Civil Service Examination. Serving as the media wing of the Government of India, IIS officers act as a crucial communication bridge between the government and the public. They work under the Ministry of Information and Broadcasting, playing an important role in information dissemination and public relations.

== List of ministers ==
=== Cabinet ministers ===
Note:

- MoS (I/C) – Minister of State (Independent Charge)
- MoS – Minister of State

Portrait	Minister (Birth-Death) Constituency	Term of office			Political party	Ministry	Prime Minister
Portrait	Minister (Birth-Death) Constituency	From	To	Period	Political party	Ministry	Prime Minister
	Vallabhbhai Patel (1875–1950); Member, Constituent Assembly (Deputy Prime Minister)	15 August 1947	26 January 1950	2 years, 164 days	Indian National Congress	Nehru I	Jawaharlal Nehru
	R. R. Diwakar (1894–1990); Member, Interim Parliament (MoS)	31 January 1950	13 May 1952	2 years, 103 days	Indian National Congress	Nehru I	Jawaharlal Nehru
	B. V. Keskar (1908–1984); MP for Musafirkhana (Minister with cabinet rank, until 1957; MoS, until 1962)	13 May 1952	9 April 1962	9 years, 331 days	Indian National Congress	Nehru II	Jawaharlal Nehru
	B. V. Keskar (1908–1984); MP for Musafirkhana (Minister with cabinet rank, until 1957; MoS, until 1962)	13 May 1952	9 April 1962	9 years, 331 days	Indian National Congress	Nehru III	Jawaharlal Nehru
	Bezawada Gopala Reddy (1907–1997); MP for Kavali	10 April 1962	31 August 1963	1 year, 143 days	Indian National Congress	Nehru IV	Jawaharlal Nehru
	Satya Narayan Sinha (1900–1983); MP for Samastipur	1 September 1963	2 July 1964	305 days	Indian National Congress	Nehru IV	Jawaharlal Nehru
	Satya Narayan Sinha (1900–1983); MP for Samastipur	1 September 1963	2 July 1964	305 days	Indian National Congress	Nanda I	Gulzarilal Nanda (acting)
	Satya Narayan Sinha (1900–1983); MP for Samastipur	1 September 1963	2 July 1964	305 days	Indian National Congress	Shastri	Lal Bahadur Shastri
	Indira Gandhi (1917–1984); Rajya Sabha MP for Uttar Pradesh	2 July 1964	24 January 1966	1 year, 344 days	Indian National Congress	Shastri	Lal Bahadur Shastri
	Indira Gandhi (1917–1984); Rajya Sabha MP for Uttar Pradesh	2 July 1964	24 January 1966	13 days	Indian National Congress	Nanda II	Gulzarilal Nanda (acting)
	Raj Bahadur (1912–1990); MP for Bharatpur (MoS)	24 January 1966	13 March 1967	1 year, 48 days	Indian National Congress	Indira I	Indira Gandhi
	Kodardas Kalidas Shah (1908–1986); Rajya Sabha MP for Maharashtra	13 March 1967	14 February 1969	1 year, 338 days	Indian National Congress	Indira II	Indira Gandhi
	Satya Narayan Sinha (1900–1983); MP for Darbhanga	14 February 1969	8 March 1971	2 years, 22 days	Indian National Congress (R)	Indira II	Indira Gandhi
	Indira Gandhi (1917–1984); MP for Raebareli (Prime Minister)	18 March 1971	8 November 1973	2 years, 235 days	Indian National Congress (R)	Indira III	Indira Gandhi
	Inder Kumar Gujral (1919–2012); Rajya Sabha MP for Punjab (MoS)	8 November 1973	28 June 1975	1 year, 232 days	Indian National Congress (R)	Indira III	Indira Gandhi
	Vidya Charan Shukla (1929–2013); MP for Raipur (MoS)	28 June 1975	24 March 1977	1 year, 269 days	Indian National Congress (R)	Indira III	Indira Gandhi
	Lal Krishna Advani (born 1927); Rajya Sabha MP for Gujarat	26 March 1977	28 July 1979	2 years, 124 days	Janata Party	Desai	Morarji Desai
	Purushottam Kaushik (1930–2017); MP for Raipur	28 July 1979	14 January 1980	170 days	Janata Party (Secular)	Charan Singh	Charan Singh
	Vasant Sathe (1925–2011); MP for Wardha	14 January 1980	2 September 1982	2 years, 231 days	Indian National Congress (Indira)	Indira IV	Indira Gandhi
	N. K. P. Salve (1921–2012); Rajya Sabha MP for Maharashtra (MoS, I/C)	2 September 1982	14 January 1983	134 days	Indian National Congress (Indira)	Indira IV	Indira Gandhi
	H. K. L. Bhagat (1921–2005); MP for East Delhi (MoS, I/C)	14 January 1983	31 October 1984	1 year, 352 days	Indian National Congress (Indira)	Indira IV	Indira Gandhi
	H. K. L. Bhagat (1921–2005); MP for East Delhi (MoS, I/C)	4 November 1984	31 December 1984	1 year, 352 days	Indian National Congress (Indira)	Rajiv I	Rajiv Gandhi
	Vitthalrao Gadgil (1928–2001); MP for Pune (MoS, I/C)	31 December 1984	22 October 1986	1 year, 295 days	Indian National Congress (Indira)	Rajiv II	Rajiv Gandhi
	Ajit Kumar Panja (1936–2008); MP for Calcutta North East (MoS, I/C)	22 October 1986	14 February 1988	1 year, 115 days	Indian National Congress (Indira)	Rajiv II	Rajiv Gandhi
	H. K. L. Bhagat (1921–2005); MP for East Delhi	14 February 1988	2 December 1989	1 year, 291 days	Indian National Congress (Indira)	Rajiv II	Rajiv Gandhi
	P. Upendra (1936–2009); Rajya Sabha MP for Andhra Pradesh	6 December 1989	10 November 1990	339 days	Telugu Desam Party	Vishwanath	V. P. Singh
	Chandra Shekhar (1927–2007); MP for Ballia (Prime Minister)	21 November 1990	21 June 1991	212 days	Samajwadi Janata Party (Rashtriya)	Chandra Shekhar	Chandra Shekhar
	Ajit Kumar Panja (1936–2008); MP for Calcutta North East (MoS, I/C)	21 June 1991	18 January 1993	1 year, 211 days	Indian National Congress	Rao	P. V. Narasimha Rao
	Brigadier; Kamakhya Prasad Singh Deo AVSM (born 1941); MP for Dhenkanal (MoS, I/C)	18 January 1993	15 September 1995	2 years, 240 days	Indian National Congress	Rao	P. V. Narasimha Rao
	P. A. Sangma (1947–2016); MP for Tura	15 September 1995	16 May 1996	244 days	Indian National Congress	Rao	P. V. Narasimha Rao
	Sushma Swaraj (1952–2019); MP for South Delhi	16 May 1996	1 June 1996	16 days	Bharatiya Janata Party	Vajpayee I	Atal Bihari Vajpayee
	C. M. Ibrahim (born 1948); Rajya Sabha MP for Karnataka	1 June 1996	1 May 1997	334 days	Janata Dal	Deve Gowda	H. D. Deve Gowda
	C. M. Ibrahim (born 1948); Rajya Sabha MP for Karnataka	1 June 1996	1 May 1997	334 days	Janata Dal	Gujral	Inder Kumar Gujral
	S. Jaipal Reddy (1942–2019); Rajya Sabha MP for Andhra Pradesh	1 May 1997	19 March 1998	322 days	Janata Dal	Gujral	Inder Kumar Gujral
	Sushma Swaraj (1952–2019); MP for South Delhi	19 March 1998	11 October 1998	206 days	Bharatiya Janata Party	Vajpayee II	Atal Bihari Vajpayee
	Atal Bihari Vajpayee (1924–2018); MP for Lucknow (Prime Minister)	11 October 1998	5 December 1998	55 days	Bharatiya Janata Party	Vajpayee II	Atal Bihari Vajpayee
	Pramod Mahajan (1949–2006); Rajya Sabha MP for Maharashtra	5 December 1998	13 October 1999	312 days	Bharatiya Janata Party	Vajpayee II	Atal Bihari Vajpayee
	Arun Jaitley (1952–2019); Rajya Sabha MP for Gujarat (MoS, I/C)	13 October 1999	30 September 2000	353 days	Bharatiya Janata Party	Vajpayee III	Atal Bihari Vajpayee
	Sushma Swaraj (1952–2019); Rajya Sabha MP for Uttar Pradesh, till 8 November 2000; Rajya Sabha MP for Uttarakhand, from 9 November 2000	30 September 2000	29 January 2003	2 years, 121 days	Bharatiya Janata Party	Vajpayee III	Atal Bihari Vajpayee
	Ravi Shankar Prasad (born 1954); Rajya Sabha MP for Bihar (MoS, I/C)	29 January 2003	22 May 2004	1 year, 114 days	Bharatiya Janata Party	Vajpayee III	Atal Bihari Vajpayee
	S. Jaipal Reddy (1942–2019); MP for Miryalguda	23 May 2004	18 November 2005	1 year, 179 days	Indian National Congress	Manmohan I	Manmohan Singh
	Priya Ranjan Dasmunsi (1945–2017); MP for Raiganj	18 November 2005	11 November 2008	2 years, 359 days	Indian National Congress	Manmohan I	Manmohan Singh
	Manmohan Singh (born 1932); Rajya Sabha MP for Assam (Prime Minister)	11 November 2008	22 May 2009	192 days	Indian National Congress	Manmohan I	Manmohan Singh
	Ambika Soni (born 1942); Rajya Sabha MP for Punjab	28 May 2009	27 October 2012	3 years, 152 days	Indian National Congress	Manmohan II	Manmohan Singh
	Manish Tewari (born 1965); MP for Ludhiana (MoS, I/C)	28 October 2012	26 May 2014	1 year, 210 days	Indian National Congress	Manmohan II	Manmohan Singh
	Prakash Javadekar (born 1951); Rajya Sabha MP for Madhya Pradesh (MoS, I/C)	27 May 2014	9 November 2014	99 days	Bharatiya Janata Party	Modi I	Narendra Modi
	Arun Jaitley (1952–2019); Rajya Sabha MP for Gujarat	9 November 2014	5 July 2016	1 year, 239 days	Bharatiya Janata Party	Modi I	Narendra Modi
	M. Venkaiah Naidu (born 1948); Rajya Sabha MP for Rajasthan	5 July 2016	18 July 2017	1 year, 13 days	Bharatiya Janata Party	Modi I	Narendra Modi
	Smriti Irani (born 1976); Rajya Sabha MP for Gujarat	18 July 2017	14 May 2018	300 days	Bharatiya Janata Party	Modi I	Narendra Modi
	Colonel; Rajyavardhan Singh Rathore AVSM (born 1970); MP for Jaipur Rural (MoS, I/C)	14 May 2018	30 May 2019	1 year, 16 days	Bharatiya Janata Party	Modi I	Narendra Modi
	Prakash Javadekar (born 1951); Rajya Sabha MP for Maharashtra	31 May 2019	7 July 2021	2 years, 37 days	Bharatiya Janata Party	Modi II	Narendra Modi
	Anurag Singh Thakur (born 1974); MP for Hamirpur	7 July 2021	9 June 2024	2 years, 338 days	Bharatiya Janata Party	Modi II	Narendra Modi
	Ashwini Vaishnaw (born 1970); Rajya Sabha MP for Odisha	10 June 2024	Incumbent	2 years, 162 days	Bharatiya Janata Party	Modi III	Narendra Modi

=== Ministers of state ===
Portrait	Minister (Birth-Death) Constituency	Term of office			Political party	Ministry	Prime Minister
Portrait	Minister (Birth-Death) Constituency	From	To	Period	Political party	Ministry	Prime Minister
	R. R. Diwakar (1894–1990); Member, Constituent Assembly	7 October 1948	26 January 1950	1 year, 111 days	Indian National Congress	Nehru I	Jawaharlal Nehru
	Inder Kumar Gujral (1919–2012); Rajya Sabha MP for Punjab	14 February 1969	18 March 1971	2 years, 32 days	Indian National Congress	Indira II	Indira Gandhi
	Sher Singh Kadyan (1917–2009); MP for Rohtak	14 February 1969	18 March 1971	2 years, 32 days	Indian National Congress	Indira II	Indira Gandhi
	Nandini Satpathy (1931–2006); Rajya Sabha MP for Odisha	18 March 1971	14 June 1972	1 year, 88 days	Indian National Congress (R)	Indira III	Indira Gandhi
	Inder Kumar Gujral (1919–2012); Rajya Sabha MP for Punjab	22 July 1972	8 November 1973	1 year, 109 days	Indian National Congress (R)	Indira III	Indira Gandhi
	Jagbir Singh; Rajya Sabha MP for Uttar Pradesh	14 August 1977	11 July 1978	331 days	Janata Party	Desai	Morarji Desai
	Jagbir Singh; Rajya Sabha MP for Uttar Pradesh	26 January 1979	15 July 1979	170 days	Janata Party	Desai	Morarji Desai
	Ram Dulari Sinha (1922–1994); MP for Sheohar	8 June 1980	19 October 1980	133 days	Indian National Congress (I)	Indira IV	Indira Gandhi
	S. Krishna Kumar (born 1993); MP for Kollam	25 June 1988	2 December 1989	1 year, 160 days	Indian National Congress (I)	Indira IV	Indira Gandhi
	Kamla Kant Tiwari; MP for Buxar	22 April 1989	2 December 1989	224 days	Indian National Congress (I)	Indira IV	Indira Gandhi
	Subodh Kant Sahay (born 1951); MP for Ranchi	21 November 1990	21 June 1991	212 days	Samajwadi Janata Party (Rashtriya)	Chandra Shekhar	Chandra Shekhar
	P. M. Sayeed (1941–2005); MP for Lakshadweep	15 September 1995	16 May 1996	244 days	Indian National Congress	Rao	P. V. Narasimha Rao
	Mukhtar Abbas Naqvi (born 1957); MP for Rampur	20 March 1998	13 October 1999	1 year, 207 days	Bharatiya Janata Party	Vajpayee II	Atal Bihari Vajpayee
	Ramesh Bais (born 1947); MP for Raipur	30 September 2000	29 January 2003	2 years, 121 days	Bharatiya Janata Party	Vajpayee III	Atal Bihari Vajpayee
	M. H. Ambareesh (1952–2018); MP for Mandya	24 October 2006	15 February 2007	142 days	Indian National Congress	Manmohan I	Manmohan Singh
	Anand Sharma (born 1953); Rajya Sabha MP for Himachal Pradesh	18 October 2008	22 May 2009	216 days	Indian National Congress	Manmohan I	Manmohan Singh
	Choudhury Mohan Jatua (born 1935); MP for Mathurapur	28 May 2009	22 September 2012	3 years, 117 days	Trinamool Congress	Manmohan II	Manmohan Singh
	S. Jagathrakshakan (born 1950); MP for Arakkonam	28 May 2009	28 October 2012	3 years, 153 days	Dravida Munnetra Kazhagam	Manmohan II	Manmohan Singh
	Colonel; Rajyavardhan Singh Rathore AVSM (born 1970); MP for Jaipur Rural	9 November 2014	14 May 2018	3 years, 186 days	Bharatiya Janata Party	Modi I	Narendra Modi
	L. Murugan (born 1977); Rajya Sabha MP for Madhya Pradesh	7 July 2021	13 October 2026	5 years, 135 days	Bharatiya Janata Party	Modi II	Narendra Modi

=== Deputy ministers ===
No.	Portrait	Minister (Birth-Death) Constituency	Term of office			Political party	Ministry	Prime Minister
No.	Portrait	Minister (Birth-Death) Constituency	From	To	Period	Political party	Ministry	Prime Minister
1		Sham Nath; MP for Chandni Chowk	8 May 1962	9 June 1964	2 years, 32 days	Indian National Congress	Nehru IV	Jawaharlal Nehru
1		Sham Nath; MP for Chandni Chowk	8 May 1962	9 June 1964	2 years, 32 days	Indian National Congress	Nanda I	Gulzarilal Nanda (acting)
2		C. R. Pattabhiraman (1906–2001); MP for Kumbakonam	15 June 1964	24 January 1966	1 year, 223 days	Indian National Congress	Shastri	Lal Bahadur Shastri
2		C. R. Pattabhiraman (1906–2001); MP for Kumbakonam	15 June 1964	24 January 1966	1 year, 223 days	Indian National Congress	Nanda II	Gulzarilal Nanda (acting)
3		Nandini Satpathy (1931–2006); Rajya Sabha MP for Odisha	29 January 1966	13 March 1967	3 years, 16 days	Indian National Congress	Indira I	Indira Gandhi
3		Nandini Satpathy (1931–2006); Rajya Sabha MP for Odisha	18 March 1967	14 February 1969	3 years, 16 days	Indian National Congress	Indira II	Indira Gandhi
4		Dharam Bir Sinha (born 1932); MP for Barh	2 May 1971	23 March 1977	5 years, 325 days	Indian National Congress (R)	Indira III	Indira Gandhi
5		Kumudben Joshi (1934–1922); Rajya Sabha MP for Gujarat	19 January 1980	15 January 1982	1 year, 361 days	Indian National Congress (I)	Indira IV	Indira Gandhi
6		Mallikarjun Goud (1941–2002); MP for Mahabubnagar	15 January 1982	7 February 1984	2 years, 23 days	Indian National Congress (I)	Indira IV	Indira Gandhi
7		Arif Mohammad Khan (born 1951); MP for Bahraich	15 January 1982	29 January 1983	1 year, 14 days	Indian National Congress (I)	Indira IV	Indira Gandhi
8		Ghulam Nabi Azad (born 1949); MP for Washim	8 February 1984	31 October 1984	266 days	Indian National Congress (I)	Indira IV	Indira Gandhi
9		S. Dhirajr (born 1993); MP for Kollam	14 February 1988	25 June 1988	132 days	Indian National Congress (I)	Rajiv II	Rajiv Gandhi
10		Girija Vyas (born 1946); MP for Udaipur	21 June 1991	17 March 1993	1 year, 210 days	Indian National Congress	Rao	P. V. Narasimha Rao
The position of Deputy Minister was abolished.

== See also ==
- Censor Board of India
- Indian Information Service
