= List of Indian union ministries =

Indian cabinets

This is a list of the executive ministries of India, from the time of its independence to the present day.

== List of Central Ministries ==
"Ministry" refers collectively to all members of the Union Council of Ministers during a given term, including Cabinet Ministers and Ministers of State alike. Articles listed by ministry contain information on the term of one prime minister, specifically the composition of their Council of Ministers.

S. No	Ministry	Formation date	Election	Governing party	Prime Minister
1	Nehru I	15 August 1947	Constituent Assembly	Indian National Congress	Jawaharlal Nehru
2	Nehru II	15 April 1952	1951–52	Indian National Congress	Jawaharlal Nehru
3	Nehru III	4 April 1957	1957	Indian National Congress	Jawaharlal Nehru
4	Nehru IV	2 April 1962	1962	Indian National Congress	Jawaharlal Nehru
Acting	Nanda I	27 May 1964	None	Indian National Congress	Gulzarilal Nanda
5	Shastri	9 June 1964	None	Indian National Congress	Lal Bahadur Shastri
Acting	Nanda II	11 January 1966	None	Indian National Congress	Gulzarilal Nanda
6	Indira I	24 January 1966	None	Indian National Congress	Indira Gandhi
7	Indira II	13 March 1967	1967	Indian National Congress	Indira Gandhi
8	Indira III	18 March 1971	1971	Indian National Congress (R)	Indira Gandhi
9	Desai	24 March 1977	1977	Janata Party	Morarji Desai
10	Charan	28 July 1979	None	Janata Party (Secular)	Charan Singh
11	Indira IV	14 January 1980	1980	Indian National Congress (Indira)	Indira Gandhi
12	Rajiv I	31 October 1984	None	Indian National Congress (Indira)	Rajiv Gandhi
13	Rajiv II	31 December 1984	1984	Indian National Congress (Indira)	Rajiv Gandhi
14	Vishwanath	2 December 1989	1989	Janata Dal	V. P. Singh
15	Chandra Shekhar	10 November 1990	None	Samajwadi Janata Party (Rashtriya)	Chandra Shekhar
16	Rao	21 June 1991	1991	Indian National Congress (I)	P. V. Narasimha Rao
17	Vajpayee I	16 May 1996	1996	Bharatiya Janata Party	Atal Bihari Vajpayee
18	Deve Gowda	1 June 1996	1996	Janata Dal	H. D. Deve Gowda
19	Gujral	21 April 1997	None	Janata Dal	Inder Kumar Gujral
20	Vajpayee II	19 March 1998	1998	Bharatiya Janata Party	Atal Bihari Vajpayee
21	Vajpayee III	13 October 1999	1999	Bharatiya Janata Party	Atal Bihari Vajpayee
22	Manmohan I	22 May 2004	2004	Indian National Congress	Manmohan Singh
23	Manmohan II	22 May 2009	2009	Indian National Congress	Manmohan Singh
24	Modi I	26 May 2014	2014	Bharatiya Janata Party	Narendra Modi
25	Modi II	30 May 2019	2019	Bharatiya Janata Party	Narendra Modi
26	Modi III	9 June 2024	2024	Bharatiya Janata Party	Narendra Modi

== See also ==
- List of prime ministers of India
