= Minister of Personnel, Public Grievances and Pensions =

Indian Cabinet Minister

- State Emblem of India

- Flag of India

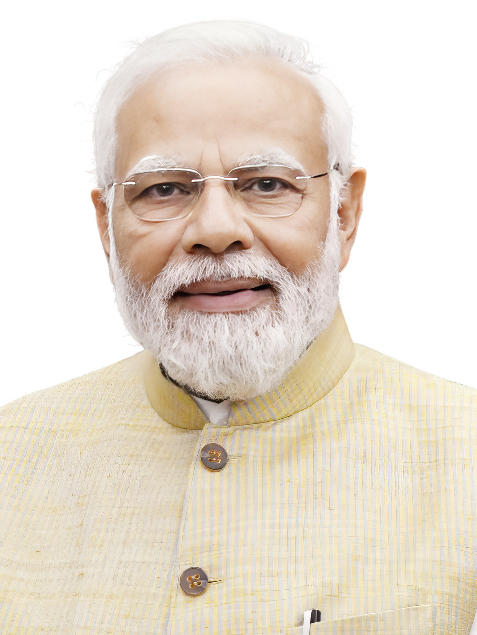
- Incumbent; Narendra Modi since 26 May 2014
- Ministry of Personnel, Public Grievances and Pensions
- Style: The Honourable
- Member of: Union Council of Ministers of India
- Reports to: President of India; Prime Minister of India; Parliament of India
- Residence: 7, Race Course Road (as Prime minister)
- Seat: South Block, Secretariat Building, New Delhi
- Nominator: Prime minister
- Appointer: President
- Formation: 1 August 1970; 56 years ago
- First holder: Indira Gandhi
- Unofficial names: Personnel Minister, Minister of Personnel
- Deputy: Minister of State for Personnel, Public Grievances and Pensions
- Website: persmin.gov.in

The minister of personnel, public grievances and pensions (IAST: Kārmik, Lok Śikāyat Aur Peṃśan Mantrī) is the cabinet minister in charge of Ministry of Personnel, Public Grievances and Pensions. The position is generally held by the prime minister, but sometimes it has been held by other senior members of the cabinet, such as the minister of home affairs. The minister is generally assisted by a minister of state.

== Powers ==
As the minister of personnel, public grievances and pensions, the prime minister exercises control over the Indian Administrative Service (IAS), the country's premier civil service, which staffs most of the senior civil service positions; the Public Enterprises Selection Board (PESB); and the Central Bureau of Investigation (CBI), except for the selection of its director, who is chosen by a committee of: (a) the prime minister, as chairperson; (b) the leader of the opposition in Lok Sabha; (c) and the chief justice.

== List of ministers ==
Portrait	Minister (Birth-Death) Constituency	Term of office			Political party	Ministry	Prime Minister
Portrait	Minister (Birth-Death) Constituency	From	To	Period	Political party	Ministry	Prime Minister
	Indira Gandhi (1917–1984); MP for Rae Bareli (Prime Minister)	1 August 1970	24 March 1977	6 years, 235 days	Indian National Congress	Indira II	Self
	Indira Gandhi (1917–1984); MP for Rae Bareli (Prime Minister)	1 August 1970	24 March 1977	6 years, 235 days	Indian National Congress	Indira III	Self
	Charan Singh (1902–1987); MP for Baghpat	24 March 1977	1 July 1978	1 year, 99 days	Janata Party	Desai	Morarji Desai
	Morarji Desai (1896–1995); MP for Surat (Prime Minister)	1 July 1978	24 January 1979	207 days	Janata Party	Desai	Morarji Desai
	Hirubhai M. Patel (1904–1993); MP for Sabarkantha	24 January 1979	28 July 1979	185 days	Janata Party	Desai	Morarji Desai
	Yashwantrao Chavan (1913–1984); MP for Satara (Deputy Prime Minister)	28 July 1979	14 January 1980	170 days	Janata Party (Secular)	Charan Singh	Charan Singh
	Zail Singh (1916–1994); MP for Hoshiarpur	14 January 1980	22 June 1982	2 years, 159 days	Indian National Congress (I)	Indira IV	Indira Gandhi
	Ramaswamy Venkataraman (1910–2009); MP for Chennai South	22 June 1982	2 September 1982	72 days	Indian National Congress (I)	Indira IV	Indira Gandhi
	Prakash Chandra Sethi (1919–1996); MP for Indore	2 September 1982	19 July 1984	1 year, 321 days	Indian National Congress (I)	Indira IV	Indira Gandhi
	P. V. Narasimha Rao (1921–2004); MP for Hanamkonda	19 July 1984	31 October 1984	165 days	Indian National Congress (I)	Indira IV	Indira Gandhi
	P. V. Narasimha Rao (1921–2004); MP for Hanamkonda	31 October 1984	31 December 1984	165 days	Indian National Congress (I)	Rajiv I	Rajiv Gandhi
	Rajiv Gandhi (1944–1991); MP for Amethi (Prime Minister)	31 December 1984	2 December 1989	4 years, 336 days	Indian National Congress (I)	Rajiv II	Rajiv Gandhi
	V. P. Singh (1931–2008); MP for Fatehpur (Prime Minister)	2 December 1989	10 November 1990	340 days	Janata Dal	V. P. Singh	Self
	Chandra Shekhar (1927–2007); MP for Ballia (Prime Minister)	10 November 1990	21 June 1991	223 days	Samajwadi Janata Party (Rashtriya)	Chandra Shekhar	Self
	P. V. Narasimha Rao (1921–2004); MP for Nandyal (Prime Minister)	21 June 1991	16 May 1996	4 years, 330 days	Indian National Congress (I)	Rao	Self
	Atal Bihari Vajpayee (1924–2018); MP for Lucknow (Prime Minister)	16 May 1996	1 June 1996	16 days	Bharatiya Janata Party	Vajpayee I	Self
	H. D. Deve Gowda (born 1933); Rajya Sabha MP for Karnataka (Prime Minister)	1 June 1996	21 April 1997	324 days	Janata Dal	Deve Gowda	Self
	Inder Kumar Gujral (1919–2012); Rajya Sabha MP for Bihar (Prime Minister)	21 April 1997	18 March 1998	331 days	Janata Dal	Gujral	Self
	Atal Bihari Vajpayee (1924–2018); MP for Lucknow (Prime Minister)	19 March 1998	30 January 2003	4 years, 317 days	Bharatiya Janata Party	Vajpayee II	Atal Bihari Vajpayee
	Atal Bihari Vajpayee (1924–2018); MP for Lucknow (Prime Minister)	19 March 1998	30 January 2003	4 years, 317 days	Bharatiya Janata Party	Vajpayee III	Atal Bihari Vajpayee
	L. K. Advani (born 1927); MP for Gandhinagar (Deputy Prime Minister)	30 January 2003	22 May 2004	1 year, 113 days	Bharatiya Janata Party	Vajpayee III	Atal Bihari Vajpayee
	Manmohan Singh (1932- 2024) Rajya Sabha MP for Assam (Prime Minister)	22 May 2004	26 May 2014	10 years, 4 days	Indian National Congress	Manmohan I	Self
	Manmohan Singh (1932- 2024) Rajya Sabha MP for Assam (Prime Minister)	22 May 2004	26 May 2014	10 years, 4 days	Indian National Congress	Manmohan II	Self
	Narendra Modi (born 1950); MP for Varanasi (Prime Minister)	26 May 2014	Incumbent	12 years, 110 days	Bharatiya Janata Party	Modi I	Self
	Narendra Modi (born 1950); MP for Varanasi (Prime Minister)	26 May 2014	Incumbent	12 years, 110 days	Bharatiya Janata Party	Modi II	Self
	Narendra Modi (born 1950); MP for Varanasi (Prime Minister)	26 May 2014	Incumbent	12 years, 110 days	Bharatiya Janata Party	Modi III	Self

== List of ministers of state ==
Portrait	Minister (Birth-Death) Constituency	Term of office			Political party	Ministry	Prime Minister
Portrait	Minister (Birth-Death) Constituency	From	To	Period	Political party	Ministry	Prime Minister
	Ram Niwas Mirdha (1924–2010); Rajya Sabha MP for Rajasthan	23 August 1970	10 October 1974	4 years, 48 days	Indian National Congress (R)	Indira II	Indira Gandhi
	Ram Niwas Mirdha (1924–2010); Rajya Sabha MP for Rajasthan	23 August 1970	10 October 1974	4 years, 48 days	Indian National Congress (R)	Indira III	Indira Gandhi
	Om Mehta (1927–1995); Rajya Sabha MP for Jammu and Kashmir	10 October 1974	24 March 1977	2 years, 165 days	Indian National Congress (R)	Indira III	Indira Gandhi
	Brigadier (Retd.); Kamakhya Prasad Singh Deo; AVSM (born 1941); MP for Dhenkanal	31 December 1984	25 September 1985	268 days	Indian National Congress (I)	Rajiv	Rajiv Gandhi
	P. Chidambaram (born 1945); MP for Sivaganga	25 September 1985	2 December 1989	4 years, 68 days	Indian National Congress (I)	Rajiv	Rajiv Gandhi
	Biren Sing Engti (born 1945); MP for Autonomous District	14 July 1986	14 February 1988	1 year, 215 days	Indian National Congress (I)	Rajiv	Rajiv Gandhi
	Margaret Alva (born 1942); MP for Karnataka (Rajya Sabha)	21 June 1991	16 May 1996	4 years, 330 days	Indian National Congress (I)	Rao	P. V. Narasimha Rao
	S. R. Balasubramoniyan (born 1938); MP for Nilgiris	29 June 1996	21 April 1997	296 days	Tamil Maanila Congress (Moopanar)	Deve Gowda	H. D. Deve Gowda
	S. R. Balasubramoniyan (born 1938); MP for Nilgiris	3 May 1997	19 March 1998	320 days	Tamil Maanila Congress (Moopanar)	Gujral	Inder Kumar Gujral
	Kadambur R. Janarthanan (1929–2020); MP for Tirunelveli	19 March 1998	8 April 1999	1 year, 20 days	All India Anna Dravida Munnetra Kazhagam	Vajpayee II	Atal Bihari Vajpayee
	Vasundhara Raje (born 1953); MP for Jhalawar	9 April 1999	30 January 2003	4 years, 296 days	Bharatiya Janata Party	Vajpayee II	Atal Bihari Vajpayee
	Vasundhara Raje (born 1953); MP for Jhalawar	9 April 1999	30 January 2003	4 years, 296 days	Bharatiya Janata Party	Vajpayee III	Atal Bihari Vajpayee
	Arun Shourie (born 1941); MP for Uttar Pradesh (Rajya Sabha)	22 November 1999	1 September 2001	1 year, 283 days	Bharatiya Janata Party	Vajpayee III	Atal Bihari Vajpayee
	Harin Pathak (born 1947); MP for Ahmedabad East	30 January 2003	22 May 2004	1 year, 113 days	Bharatiya Janata Party	Vajpayee III	Atal Bihari Vajpayee
	Suresh Pachouri (born 1952); MP for Madhya Pradesh (Rajya Sabha)	23 May 2004	6 April 2008	3 years, 319 days	Indian National Congress	Manmohan I	Manmohan Singh
	Prithviraj Chavan (born 1946); MP for Maharashtra (Rajya Sabha)	6 April 2008	22 May 2009	2 years, 218 days	Indian National Congress	Manmohan I	Manmohan Singh
	Prithviraj Chavan (born 1946); MP for Maharashtra (Rajya Sabha)	28 May 2009	10 November 2010	2 years, 218 days	Indian National Congress	Manmohan II	Manmohan Singh
	V. Narayanasamy (born 1947); MP for Puducherry	10 November 2010	26 May 2014	3 years, 197 days	Indian National Congress	Manmohan II	Manmohan Singh
	Jitendra Singh (born 1956); MP for Udhampur	26 May 2014	Incumbent	12 years, 110 days	Bharatiya Janata Party	Modi I	Narendra Modi
	Jitendra Singh (born 1956); MP for Udhampur	26 May 2014	Incumbent	12 years, 110 days	Bharatiya Janata Party	Modi II	Narendra Modi
	Jitendra Singh (born 1956); MP for Udhampur	26 May 2014	Incumbent	12 years, 110 days	Bharatiya Janata Party	Modi III	Narendra Modi
