= Satya Narayan Sinha =

Indian politician (1900–1983)

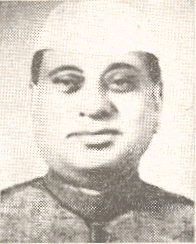

4th Governor of Madhya Pradesh
- In office 8 March 1971 – 13 October 1977
- Chief Minister: Shyama Charan Shukla; Prakash Chandra Sethi; Kailash Chandra Joshi
- Preceded by: K. Chengalaraya Reddy
- Succeeded by: N. N. Wanchu

Minister of Health
- In office 14 November 1967 – 14 February 1969
- Prime Minister: Indira Gandhi
- Preceded by: Sripati Chandrasekhar (As Minister of State)
- Succeeded by: Kodardas Kalidas Shah

Minister of Information and Broadcasting
- In office September 1963 – June 1964
- Prime Minister: Jawaharlal Nehru
- Preceded by: B. V. Keskar
- Succeeded by: Indira Gandhi

4th Leader of the Lok Sabha
- In office 24 January 1966 – 3 March 1967
- Preceded by: Gulzarilal Nanda
- Succeeded by: Indira Gandhi

Personal details
- Born: 9 July 1900 Shambhupatti, Darbhanga district, Bengal Presidency, British India (present-day Samastipur district, Bihar, India)
- Died: 26 July 1983 (aged 83) Samastipur, Bihar, India
- Party: Indian National Congress
- Occupation: Politician

Satya Narayan Sinha (9 July 1900 – 26 July 1983) was an Indian National Congress politician who served as the member of Constituent Assembly and Minister of Parliamentary Affairs. He was the first Leader of the House in Lok Sabha not to be a prime minister.

== Details ==
Satya Narayan Sinha was born in Sambhupatti Samastipur. He was elected to the Lower house of the Indian Parliament the Lok Sabha in 1952 from Samastipur East, 1957 and 1962 from Samastipur and in 1967 from Darbhanga in Bihar, India.

Sinha served as Minister for Parliamentary Affairs and Communications from 1964 to 1967, and as Minister for Health, Family Planning and Urban Development from 1967 to 1971. He was appointed Governor of Madhya Pradesh in 1971, and served in this role until 1977. He died on 26 July 1983, aged 83.
