= M. R. Krishna =

Indian politician

M. R. Krishna (born at Trimulgherry, 1924) was member of 1st Lok Sabha from Karimnagar (Lok Sabha constituency) in Andhra Pradesh State, India. He was re-elected to 2nd Lok Sabha from Karimnagar.

Later he was elected to 3rd and 4th Lok Sabha from Peddapalle (Lok Sabha constituency). He a member of the Scheduled Castes Federation (SCF) (later the Republican Party of India), B. R. Ambedkar's political party.
