= Balgovind Verma =

Indian politician (1923–1980)

Balgovind Verma (20 August 1923 – 1980) was an Indian politician who was a member of 3rd Lok Sabha from Kheri (Lok Sabha constituency) in the state of Uttar Pradesh.

Verma was born in Chhetonia village, Lakhimpur Kheri district on 20 August 1923. He was elected to the 4th, 5th and 7th Lok Sabha from Kheri.

Verma died from a massive heart attack in 1980. His widow, Usha Verma won the subsequent by-election and succeeded him as the MP for Kheri.
