= Parimal Ghosh =

Indian politician and diplomat

Member of parliament, Lok Sabha
- In office 1967-1971
- Preceded by: Sachindra Chaudhuri
- Succeeded by: Jagadish Bhattachaya
- Constituency: Ghatal, West Bengal

Member, West Bengal Legislative Assembly
- In office 1957-1962
- Preceded by: Kshitish Chandra Ghose
- Succeeded by: Debsaran Ghosh
- Constituency: Beldanga constituency

Personal details
- Born: 15 March 1917 Jalpaiguri, Bengal Presidency, British India
- Died: 14 October 1985 (aged 68) Calcutta, West Bengal, India
- Party: Indian National Congress
- Spouse: Nalini Ranjan Ghosh
- Children: 1 son

Parimal Ghosh (15 March 1917 – 14 October 1985) was an Indian politician and diplomat. He was elected to the Lok Sabha, lower house of the Parliament of India from Ghatal in 1967. He was the Minister of State for Railways under Indira Gandhi from 1967 to 1969. He was elected to the West Bengal legislative assembly from Beldanga constituency in 1957 . He served as Ambassador to Turkey from 1981 to 1984.
