= Ram Sewak Chowdhary =

Indian politician (1927–2012)

Member of Parliament, Rajya Sabha
- In office 1980–1992
- Constituency: Uttar Pradesh

Member of Parliament, Lok Sabha
- In office 1962–1977
- Succeeded by: Ramcharan
- Constituency: Jalaun, Uttar Pradesh

Personal details
- Born: 1927 Orai, Jalaun district, United Provinces, British India (present-day Uttar Pradesh, India)
- Died: 28 July 2012
- Party: Indian National Congress

Ram Sewak Chowdhary (1927 – 28 July 2012) was an Indian politician. He was a Member of Parliament, representing Uttar Pradesh in the Rajya Sabha the upper house of India's Parliament representing the Indian National Congress.

Chowdhary died on 28 July 2012 at the age of 85.
