= Sripati Chandrasekhar =

Indian demographer, economist, sociologist and scholar

Sripati Chandrasekhar (22 November 1918, Rajahmundry - 14 June 2001, San Diego, California) was a well-known Indian demographer, economist, sociologist, and scholar who has published extensively on demographics, especially related to India.

Sripati Chandrasekhar

Chandrasekhar attended Vorhees High School in Vellore India which was a Protestant Christian school. Later, he attended Madras Presidency College, from where he graduated with a B.A. and M.A. in economics. In 1944, he earned a Ph.D. in Sociology from New York University.

Sripati married Ann Downes, an American Quaker from New Jersey, in a wedding officiated by protestant unitarian John Haynes Holmes in 1947. In April 1964, Chandrasekhar was elected to the upper house of the Indian parliament. He was appointed Minister of Health and Family Planning by Prime Minister Indira Gandhi in 1967.

Chandresekhar was deeply concerned by the growing Indian population, and advocated a variety of population control measures such as sterilization, abortion, and abstinence. He faced criticism from traditional sectors of society, for example when he advocated that Indians begin eating beef, in contravention of Hindu tradition. He also traveled through communist China, studying its population and social and economic trends.
