= Nitiraj Singh =

Indian politician

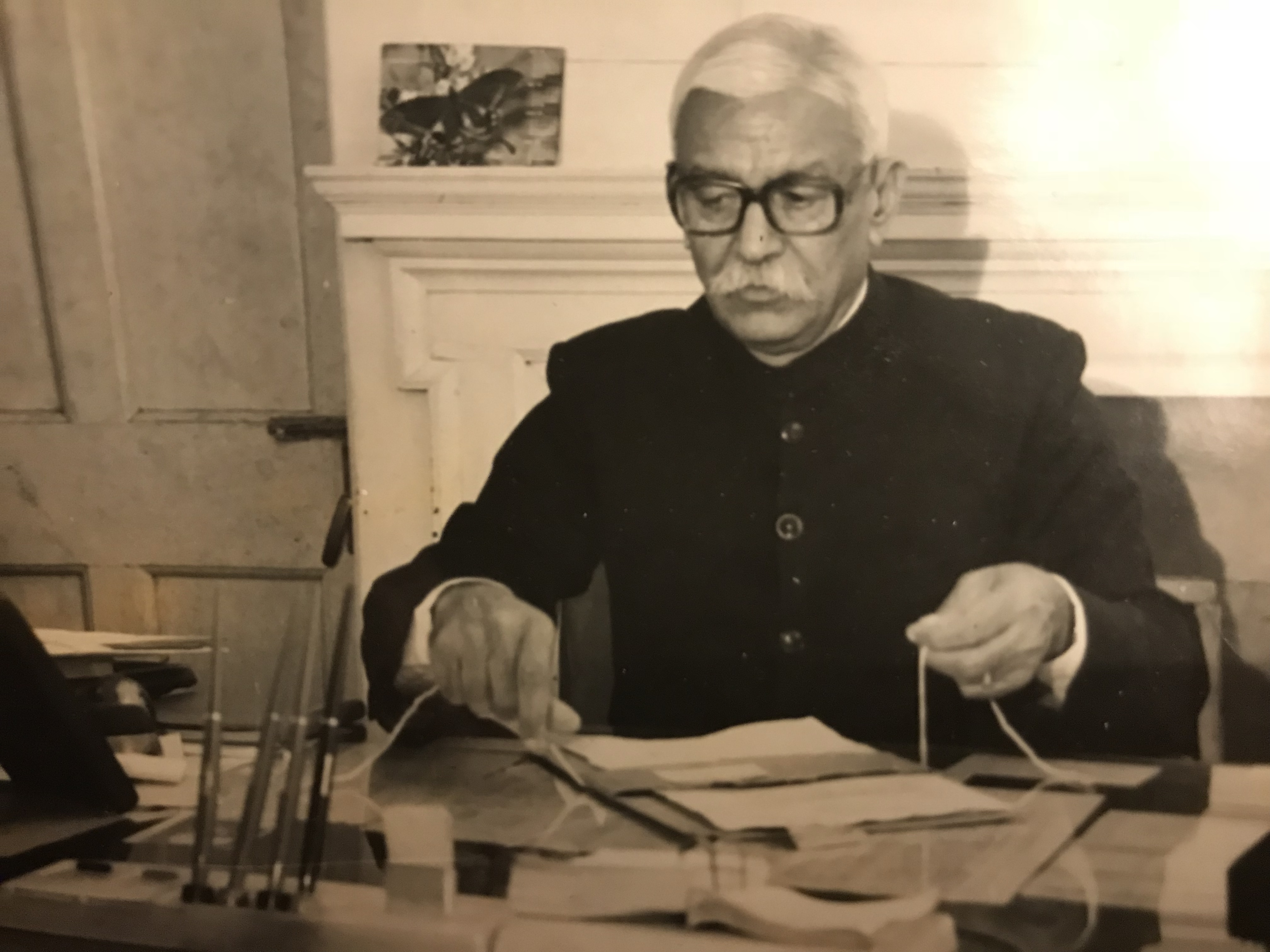
- Nitiraj Singh in his office in New Delhi, India in 1971.

Member of Parliament, Lok Sabha
- In office 1967–1977
- Preceded by: Hari Vishnu Kamath
- Succeeded by: Hari Vishnu Kamath
- Constituency: Narmadapuram, Madhya Pradesh

Personal details
- Born: 13 February 1909 Imaliya, Narsinghpur district, British India (now Madhya Pradesh, India)
- Died: 28 October 1988 (aged 79)
- Party: Indian National Congress
- Other political affiliations: None
- Spouse: Gopi Bai
- Children: 2 sons and 3 daughters

Nitiraj Singh (13 February 1909 – 28 October 1988) was an Indian politician belonging to the Indian National Congress. He was elected to the Lower House of Parliament the Lok Sabha from Narmadapuram, Madhya Pradesh, India in 1967 and 1971. He was the Minister of state for Petroleum and Chemicals and Mines and Metals from June 1970 to May 1971 and was later the Minister of State for Law & Justice in the Indira Gandhi Government.
