= Gulzarilal Nanda =

Indian politician and economist (1898–1998)

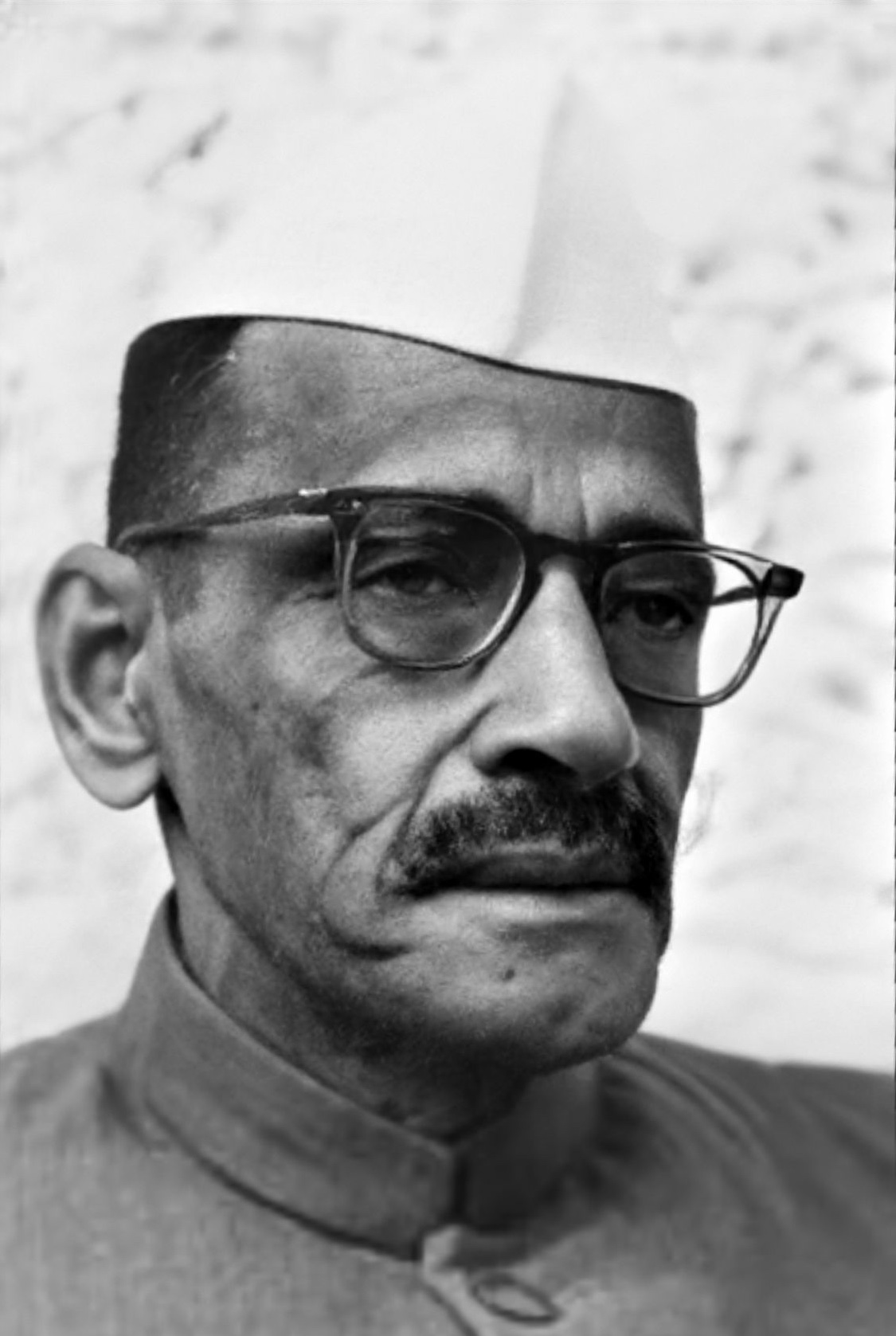
- Nanda in 1965

Prime Minister of India
- Acting
- In office 11 January 1966 – 24 January 1966
- President: Sarvepalli Radhakrishnan
- Vice President: Zakir Husain
- Preceded by: Lal Bahadur Shastri
- Succeeded by: Indira Gandhi
- In office 27 May 1964 – 9 June 1964
- President: Sarvepalli Radhakrishnan
- Vice President: Zakir Husain
- Preceded by: Jawaharlal Nehru
- Succeeded by: Lal Bahadur Shastri

Union Minister of Home Affairs
- In office 29 August 1963 – 14 November 1966
- Prime Minister: Jawaharlal Nehru; Lal Bahadur Shastri; Indira Gandhi
- Preceded by: Lal Bahadur Shastri
- Succeeded by: Yashwantrao Chavan

Union Minister of External Affairs
- In office 27 May 1964 – 7 June 1964
- Prime Minister: Himself (Acting)
- Preceded by: Jawaharlal Nehru
- Succeeded by: Lal Bahadur Shastri

Deputy Chairman of the Planning Commission
- In office 17 February 1953 – 21 September 1963
- Preceded by: Position established
- Succeeded by: V. T. Krishnamachari

Leader of the House in Lok Sabha
- In office 11 January 1966 – 24 January 1966
- Preceded by: Jawaharlal Nehru
- Succeeded by: Lal Bahadur Shastri
- In office 27 May 1964 – 9 June 1964
- Preceded by: Lal Bahadur Shastri
- Succeeded by: Satya Narayan Sinha

Personal details
- Born: 4 July 1898 Sialkot, Punjab, British India (present-day Punjab, Pakistan)
- Died: 15 January 1998 (aged 99) Ahmedabad, Gujarat, India
- Party: Indian National Congress
- Spouse: Lakshmi Nanda (m. 1916)
- Children: 3
- Education: Allahabad University
- Occupation: Economist; politician

Gulzarilal Nanda (4 July 1898 – 15 January 1998) was an Indian politician and economist who specialised in labour issues. He served as the acting Prime Minister of India for two 13-day tenures following the deaths of Jawaharlal Nehru in 1964 and Lal Bahadur Shastri in 1966 respectively. Both his terms ended after the ruling Indian National Congress's parliamentary party elected a new prime minister. He was awarded the Bharat Ratna, India's highest civilian award in 1997. Living until the age of 99 years and 195 days, Nanda holds the record as the longest-lived Prime Minister in India's history.

== Early life ==
Gulzarilal was born on 4 July 1898 in Sialkot in the Punjab, British India in a Punjabi Hindu Khatri family. Sialkot later became a part of the Punjab Province of Pakistan in 1947, after the partition of India. Nanda received his education in Lahore, Amritsar, Agra, and Allahabad. He met Mahatma Gandhi in 1921 and he settled in Gujarat on his request.

=== Research worker ===
Nanda worked as a research scholar on labour problems at Allahabad University (1920–1921), and became a professor of economics at National College in Bombay (Mumbai) in 1921. The same year, he joined the Indian Non-Cooperation Movement against the British Raj. In 1922, he became secretary of the Ahmedabad Textile Labour Association where he worked until 1946. He was imprisoned for Satyagraha in 1932, and again from 1942 to 1944.

He married his wife Lakshmi, with whom he had two sons and a daughter.

== Lok Sabha member ==
Nanda was elected to the Lok Sabha in the 1957 elections, and was appointed Union Minister for Labour, Employment and Planning, and later, as Deputy Chairman of the Planning Commission. He visited the Federal Republic of Germany, Yugoslavia, and Austria in 1959.

Nanda was re-elected to the Lok Sabha in the 1962 elections from the Sabarkantha constituency in Gujarat. He initiated the Congress Forum for Socialist Action in 1962. He was Union Minister for Labour and Employment in 1962–1963, and Minister for Home Affairs in 1963–1966.

Nanda was re-elected to the Lok Sabha in the 1967 and 1971 elections from the Kaithal Constituency in Haryana. In 1971, he resigned from the Congress saying that he did not like the politics of that era.

== Acting Prime Minister ==
Nanda was the Acting Prime Minister of India twice for thirteen days each: the first time after the death of the country's first Prime Minister Jawaharlal Nehru in 1964, and the second time after the death of Prime Minister Lal Bahadur Shastri in 1966. He was the Home Minister of India during both these periods, which is the reason for him being chosen as Prime Minister. The Indian Constitution has no provision for an "acting" Prime Minister. Both his terms were uneventful, yet they came at sensitive times because of the potential danger to the country following Nehru's death soon after the Sino-Indian War in 1962 and Shastri's death after the Indo-Pakistani war of 1965.

== Death ==
Nanda died on 15 January 1998. Possibly from 25 November 1997, when former Malawian President Hastings Banda died, until his own death, Nanda was the oldest living former state leader. At his death, Nanda was the last surviving member of the second and third Nehru cabinets and the last living state leader to have been born in the 19th century.

== Gandhian life ==
He lived a very simple life, with no personal property at the time of his death. He never allowed politics to influence his family life. Yet he always had enough time for his family. He once engaged his government provided driver for a car that was used by his family. He never allowed his family to use his official vehicle. He once got angry with his staff when he learned that his grandson, Tejas used his office paper and drew a picture. He immediately purchased paper from market and gave his grandson to draw on it.

He was also concerned about rising corruption in the country and suggested to decrease wasteful consumption by officials and people in general. He had also opposed the Emergency imposed by Indira Gandhi, as he felt that the sacrifices to bring democracy to India became meaningless due to the tyranny.

== Awards and honours ==
=== National honours ===
- India:
  - Bharat Ratna (1997)

=== Foreign honours ===
- Bangladesh:
  - Bangladesh Liberation War Honour (2013, posthumously)

== In popular culture ==
A Dedicated Worker – Shri Gulzarilal Nanda is a 1999 short documentary film directed by A. K. Goorha and produced by the Films Division of India which covers Nanda's work towards labourers and others as the PM and otherwise.

Political offices
Preceded by Lal Bahadur Shastri	Minister of Home Affairs; 1963–1966	Succeeded by Yashwantrao Chavan
Preceded by Jawaharlal Nehru	Prime Minister of India 1964	Succeeded by Lal Bahadur Shastri
Preceded by Jawaharlal Nehru	Chairperson of the Planning Commission 1964	Succeeded by Lal Bahadur Shastri
Preceded by Jawaharlal Nehru	Minister of External Affairs; 1964	Succeeded by Lal Bahadur Shastri
Preceded by Lal Bahadur Shastri	Prime Minister of India 1966	Succeeded by Indira Gandhi
Preceded by Lal Bahadur Shastri	Chairperson of the Planning Commission 1966	Succeeded by Indira Gandhi
