= Om Mehta =

Indian politician

Union Minister of State for Parliamentary Affairs
- In office 30 June 1970 – 24 March 1977
- Prime Minister: Indira Gandhi
- Minister: Kotha Raghuramaiah; Raj Bahadur; Kotha Raghuramaiah

Union Minister of State for Home Affairs (Personnel and Administrative Reforms)
- In office 10 October 1974 – 24 March 1977
- Prime Minister: Indira Gandhi
- Minister: Kasu Brahmananda Reddy

Union Minister of State for Works and Housing
- In office 5 February 1973 – 10 October 1974
- Prime Minister: Indira Gandhi
- Minister: Bhola Paswan Shastri

Union Minister of State for Shipping and Transport
- In office 2 May 1971 – 5 February 1973
- Prime Minister: Indira Gandhi
- Minister: Raj Bahadur

Member of Parliament, Rajya Sabha
- In office 3 June 1964 – 2 April 1982
- Constituency: Jammu and Kashmir

Personal details
- Born: 20 February 1927 Kishtwar, Jammu and Kashmir, British India
- Died: 12 February 1995 (aged 67) New Delhi, India
- Party: Indian National Congress
- Other political affiliations: Jammu and Kashmir National Conference (before 1964)
- Education: Prince of Wales College, Jammu

Om Mehta (20 February 1927 – 12 February 1995) was an Indian politician who served as the Minister of State for Home, Personnel, and Parliamentary Affairs with independent charge during the Indian Emergency under Indira Gandhi's government. Mehta played a notable role within the Indian National Congress, contributing to various development initiatives, particularly in Jammu and Kashmir.

== Early life and education ==
Om Mehta was born on 20 February 1927 in Kishtwar, Jammu and Kashmir, then part of British India. He attended Prince of Wales College, now known as Gandhi Memorial Science College, in Jammu. Mehta initially joined the Jammu and Kashmir National Conference in 1947 and later moved to the Indian National Congress in 1964.

== Political career ==
Mehta began his political journey as a member of the National Conference, serving on the Legislative Council of Jammu and Kashmir in 1957 and 1959. He advocated for development initiatives in Kishtwar and played a role in creating employment opportunities for the region. In 1962, he was appointed Director General of the J&K Cooperative Bank and was an active member of various committees, including the Bharat Sewak Sangh, the Panchayati Raj Committee, the Red Industries Board, and the Constitution Club in New Delhi.

In 1964, he joined the Indian National Congress and was elected to the Rajya Sabha (upper house of Parliament) as a representative from Jammu and Kashmir. He served on the Public Accounts Committee from 1966 to 1968. During his tenure, Mehta was appointed to various ministerial roles, including the Union Minister of Aviation and Transport in 1971 and, later, the Minister of State for Home Affairs from 1974 to 1977, where he held independent charge.

== Contributions ==
Mehta was instrumental in various development projects in Jammu and Kashmir. Some of his notable contributions include:

- Initiating the Dul Hasti Hydroelectric Plant.
- Developing the Batote-Kishtwar National Highway.
- Improving infrastructure through projects like the Kishtwar-Manali border road and the Bhadarwah-Chamba road.
- Enhancing the water supply systems in Kishtwar.

His work in the Congress and his close association with Indira Gandhi allowed him to advocate effectively for Jammu and Kashmir's development at the national level.

== Later life and legacy ==
Om Mehta's career reflected a dedication to the welfare of Jammu and Kashmir. His contributions to the region's infrastructure and public projects earned him significant respect. He died on 12 February 1995 in New Delhi, remembered for his efforts in both regional and national politics.

A road in Kishtwar town has been named in Om Mehta’s honor as "Om Mehta Road," recognizing his contributions to the region's development and his service to the people of Jammu and Kashmir.
