= Kodardas Kalidas Shah =

Indian politician

Kodardas Kalidas Shah (October 15, 1908 – March 14, 1986) was an Indian politician who served as the Governor of Tamil Nadu from 1971 to 1976.

Kodardas Kalidas Shah

Born in a Khadayat Vanik family in Gabat village in Bayad Taluka of Sabarkantha District in present-day Gujarat and was a solicitor by profession. He died on March 14, 1986, due to cardiac arrest in Calcutta. His son Prakash Shah is a practicing CPA in Salinas, California and runs a CPA firm by the name of Stevens, Sloan, & Shah.

Government offices
Preceded by Sardar Ujjal Singh	Governor of Tamil Nadu; 27 May 1971 – 16 June 1976	Succeeded by Mohan Lal Sukhadia
