= New Delhi Lok Sabha constituency =

Constituency

Coordinates: 28.6350°N 77.2200°E

New Delhi DL-4
- Lok Sabha constituency
- Interactive Map Outlining New Delhi Lok Sabha constituency

Constituency details
- Country: India
- Region: North India
- Union Territory: Delhi
- Assembly constituencies: Karol Bagh; Patel Nagar; Moti Nagar; Delhi Cantt; Rajinder Nagar; New Delhi; Kasturba Nagar; Malviya Nagar; R K Puram; Greater Kailash
- Established: 1951
- Reservation: None

Member of Parliament
- 18th Lok Sabha
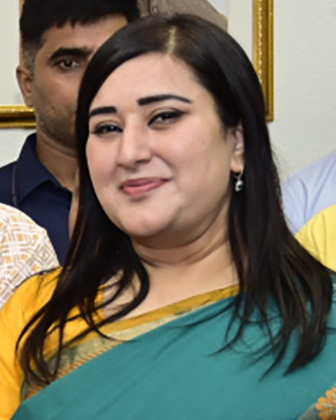
- Incumbent Bansuri Swaraj
- Party: BJP
- Alliance: NDA
- Elected year: 2024

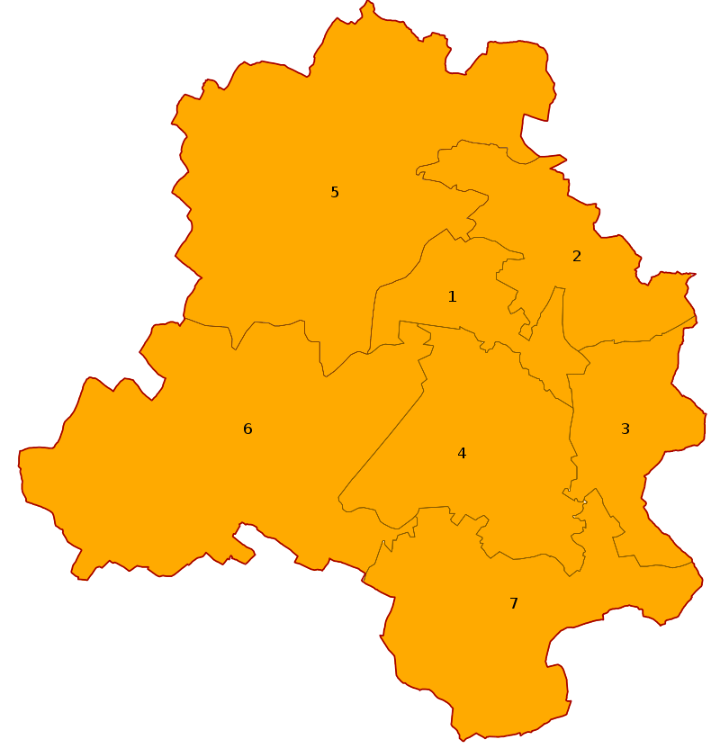
Political map of Delhi (National Capital Territory of Delhi) showing parliamentary constituencies as of 2024 elections.

New Delhi Lok Sabha constituency is one of the 7 Lok Sabha (parliamentary) constituencies in the Indian National Capital Territory of Delhi. This constituency came into existence in 1951. It is the oldest constituency of Delhi that currently exists.

== Assembly segments ==
Following the delimitation of the parliamentary constituencies, in 2008, it comprises the following Delhi Vidhan Sabha segments:

#	Name	District	Member	Party	Leading (in 2024)
23	Karol Bagh (SC)	Central Delhi	Vishesh Ravi	AAP	BJP
24	Patel Nagar (SC)	New Delhi	Pravesh Ratn	AAP	BJP
25	Moti Nagar	West Delhi	Harish Khurana	BJP	BJP
38	Delhi Cantt	New Delhi	Virender Singh Kadian	AAP	AAP
39	Rajinder Nagar	New Delhi	Umang Bajaj	BJP	BJP
40	New Delhi	New Delhi	Parvesh Verma	BJP	AAP
42	Kasturba Nagar	South East Delhi	Neeraj Basoya	BJP	BJP
43	Malviya Nagar	South Delhi	Satish Upadhyay	BJP	BJP
44	R K Puram	New Delhi	Anil Kumar Sharma	BJP	AAP
50	Greater Kailash	New Delhi	Shikha Roy	BJP	BJP

From 1993 to 2008, it comprised the following Delhi Vidhan Sabha segments:

1. Sarojini Nagar (Polling stations 1-93)
2. Gole Market (Polling stations 1-100)
3. Minto Road (Polling stations 1-135)
4. Kasturba Nagar (Polling stations 1-21 and 23-114)
5. Jangpura
6. Matia Mahal (Polling stations 84-108)

From 1966 to 1993, New Delhi Lok Sabha constituency comprised the following Delhi Metropolitan Council segments:

1. Sarojini Nagar
2. Laxmibai Nagar
3. Gole Market
4. Bara Khamba
5. Minto Road
6. Jangpura
7. Kasturba Nagar
8. Lajpat Nagar

== Members of Parliament ==
The New Delhi Lok Sabha constituency was created in 1952. The list of Member of Parliament (MP) is as follows:

Year	Member	Party
1952	Sucheta Kripalani	Kisan Mazdoor Praja Party
1957	Sucheta Kripalani	Indian National Congress
1961^	Balraj Madhok	Bharatiya Jana Sangh
1962	Mehr Chand Khanna	Indian National Congress
1967	Manohar Lal Sondhi	Bharatiya Jana Sangh
1971	Mukul Banerji	Indian National Congress
1977	Atal Bihari Vajpayee	Janata Party
1980	Atal Bihari Vajpayee	Janata Party
1984	Krishan Chandra Pant	Indian National Congress
1989	Lal Krishna Advani	Bharatiya Janata Party
1991	Lal Krishna Advani	Bharatiya Janata Party
1992^	Rajesh Khanna	Indian National Congress
1996	Jagmohan Malhotra	Bharatiya Janata Party
1998	Jagmohan Malhotra	Bharatiya Janata Party
1999	Jagmohan Malhotra	Bharatiya Janata Party
2004	Ajay Maken	Indian National Congress
2009	Ajay Maken	Indian National Congress
2014	Meenakashi Lekhi	Bharatiya Janata Party
2019	Meenakashi Lekhi	Bharatiya Janata Party
2024	Bansuri Swaraj	Bharatiya Janata Party

^By-Poll

== Election results ==
Vote share of winning candidates
2024	53.48%
2019	54.77%
2014	46.75%
2009	59.59%
2004	52.04%
1999	54.95%
1998	54.36%
1996	54.34%
1992 (by-election)	52.48%
1991	43.40%
1989	55.54%
1984	67.86%
1980	48.52%
1977	71.26%
1971	64.38%
1967	55.39%
1962	56.66%
1961 (by-election)	46.04%
1952	46.72%

=== 18th Lok Sabha ===
2024 Indian general elections: New Delhi
Party	Candidate	Votes	%	±%
BJP	Bansuri Swaraj	453,185	53.48	▼1.29
AAP	Somnath Bharti	374,815	44.23	▲27.90
NOTA	None of the Above	4,813	0.57	▼0.15
Majority		78,370	9.25	▼18.61
Turnout		8,47,764	55.53	
BJP hold		Swing	▼1.29	

=== 17th Lok Sabha ===
2019 Indian general elections: New Delhi
Party	Candidate	Votes	%	±%
BJP	Meenakshi Lekhi	504,206	54.77	▲8.02
INC	Ajay Maken	2,47,702	26.91	▲8.04
AAP	Brijesh Goyal	1,50,342	16.33	▼13.64
NOTA	None of the Above	6,601	0.72	▲0.14
Majority		2,56,504	27.86	▲11.08
Turnout		9,20,567	56.91	▼8.17
BJP hold		Swing	▲8.02	

=== 16th Lok Sabha ===
2014 Indian general elections: New Delhi
Party	Candidate	Votes	%	±%
BJP	Meenakshi Lekhi	453,350	46.75	▲11.71
AAP	Ashish Khetan	2,90,642	29.97	New
INC	Ajay Maken	1,82,893	18.87	▼40.72
IND.	Ravi Kumar Gupta	20,028	2.07	N/A
BSP	Solomon George	6,088	0.63	
NOTA	None of the Above	5,589	0.58	N/A
Majority		1,62,708	16.78	▼7.77
Turnout		9,69,812	65.08	▲9.40
BJP gain from INC		Swing	▼12.84	

=== 15th Lok Sabha ===
2009 Indian general elections: New Delhi
Party	Candidate	Votes	%	±%
INC	Ajay Maken	455,867	59.59	+7.55
BJP	Vijay Goel	2,68,058	35.04	−10.69
BSP	Trilok Chand Sharma	22,364	2.92	+1.93
YFE	Major Sangeeta Tomar	2,099	0.27	N/A
SP	Aamer Ahmed Madni	1,732	0.23	N/A
Majority		1,87,809	24.55	+18.24
Turnout		7,65,018	55.83	
INC hold		Swing		

=== 14th Lok Sabha ===
2004 Indian general elections: New Delhi
Party	Candidate	Votes	%	±%
INC	Ajay Maken	105,415	52.04	▲9.39
BJP	Jagmohan	92,631	45.73	▼9.22
BSP	Vikram	1,983	0.93	N/A
Independent	Sanjay Kumar Yadav	680	0.34	N/A
Independent	Javed Abidi	397	0.20	N/A
Majority		12,784	6.31	▼5.99
Turnout		2,02,557	44.59	▲2.81
INC gain from BJP		Swing		

=== 13th Lok Sabha ===
1999 Indian general election: New Delhi
Party	Candidate	Votes	%	±%
BJP	Jag Mohan	124,626	54.95	▲0.59
INC	R. K. Dhawan	96,733	42.65	▲0.98
Independent	Ram Kumar Azad	1,579	0.69	N/A
NCP	J.L. Jahrat	1,161	0.51	New
Independent	Rajendra Singhal	781	0.34	N/A
Majority		27,893	12.30	▼0.39
Turnout		2,26,758	41.78	▼8.43
BJP hold		Swing		

=== 12th Lok Sabha ===
1998 Indian general election: New Delhi
Party	Candidate	Votes	%	±%
BJP	Jagmohan	139,905	54.36	▲0.02
INC	R. K. Dhawan	1,07,258	41.67	▲9.97
JD	Hukum Singh	4,060	1.57	▼5.38
BSP	Khem Chand Jatav	2,582	1.00	N/A
RJD	Swaraj Bala	1,081	0.42	New
Majority		32,647	12.69	▼9.95
Turnout		2,57,355	50.21	▼0.74
BJP hold		Swing		

=== 11th Lok Sabha ===
1996 Indian general election: New Delhi
Party	Candidate	Votes	%	±%
BJP	Jagmohan	139,945	54.34	▲10.94
INC	Rajesh Khanna	81,630	31.70	▼10.96
JD	Shoaib Iqbal	17,905	6.95	▼2.52
AIIC(T)	Madan Singh Bisht	5,027	1.95	New
Independent	Dharam Dutt	1,933	0.75	N/A
Majority		58,315	22.64	▲21.90
Turnout		2,57,513	50.95	▲3.63
BJP gain from INC		Swing		

=== 10th Lok Sabha ===
1991 Indian general election: New Delhi
Party	Candidate	Votes	%	±%
BJP	Lal Krishna Advani	93,662	43.40	▲5.51
INC	Rajesh Khanna	92,073	42.66	▼9.82
JD	Manju Mohan	20,439	9.47	▲3.98
JP	Himanshu Pandey	2,834	1.31	N/A
BSP	Om Parkash	641	0.30	N/A
Majority		1,589	0.74	▼13.85
Turnout		2,15,834	47.32	▲4.87
BJP hold		Swing		

==== 10th Lok Sabha: 1992 By Election ====
- The bye-poll was held because Advani retained Gandhinagar seat which he had won in 1991, and vacated New Delhi seat.

By Election, 1992: New Delhi
Party	Candidate	Votes	%	±%
INC	Rajesh Khanna	101,625	52.48	▲10.63
BJP	Shatrughan Sinha	73,369	37.89	▼17.65
JD	J. B. Jatav	10,638	5.49	N/A
Independent	S. Kumar	1,135	0.58	N/A
Independent	P. Devi	753	0.38	N/A
Majority		28,256	14.59	▲0.90
Turnout		1,93,612	42.45	▼11.74
INC gain from BJP		Swing		

=== 9th Lok Sabha ===
1989 Indian general election: New Delhi
Party	Candidate	Votes	%	±%
BJP	Lal Krishna Advani	129,256	55.54	▲25.17
INC	V. Mohini Giri	97,415	41.85	▼26.01
Independent	Maharaj Kumar	848	0.36	N/A
Independent	Harkesh Singh Ujjainwal	728	0.31	N/A
Independent	Rattan	531	0.23	N/A
Majority		31,841	13.69	▼23.80
Turnout		2,32,744	54.19	▼9.74
BJP gain from INC		Swing		

=== 8th Lok Sabha ===
1984 Indian general election: New Delhi
Party	Candidate	Votes	%	±%
INC	Krishna Chandra Pant	131,932	67.86	▲67.86
BJP	Kanwar Lal Gupta	59,046	30.37	N/A
Independent	Karuna Lal	514	0.26	N/A
Independent	Harish Dhingra	442	0.23	N/A
Independent	Rup Lal Mehta	393	0.20	N/A
Majority		72,886	37.49	▲34.89
Turnout		1,94,413	63.93	▼0.48
INC gain from JP		Swing		

=== 7th Lok Sabha ===
1980 Indian general election: New Delhi
Party	Candidate	Votes	%	±%
JP	Atal Bihari Vajpayee	94,098	48.52	▼22.74
INC	C. M. Stephen	89,053	45.92	▲45.92
JP(S)	Rajinder Puri	4,682	2.41	New
INC(U)	Mukul Banerjee	762	0.39	New
Independent	Yogeshwar Bhagwan	664	0.34	N/A
Majority		5,045	2.60	▼41.08
Turnout		1,93,933	64.41	▼0.88
JP hold		Swing		

=== 6th Lok Sabha ===
1977 Indian general election: New Delhi
Party	Candidate	Votes	%	±%
JP	Atal Bihari Vajpayee	125,936	71.26	New
INC(R)	Shashi Bhushan	48,750	27.58	▼36.80
Independent	Urmila	628	0.36	N/A
Independent	Maharaj Kumar	580	0.33	N/A
Independent	Laxmi Kant Jha	529	0.30	N/A
Independent	Virendra Kumar	321	0.18	N/A
Majority		77,186	43.68	▲8.66
Turnout		1,76,744	65.29	▲6.77
JP gain from INC(R)		Swing		

=== 5th Lok Sabha ===
1971 Indian general election: New Delhi
Party	Candidate	Votes	%	±%
INC(R)	Mukul Banerji	81,867	64.38	▲25.75
ABJS	M. L. Sondhi	37,334	29.36	▼26.03
Independent	S. Madhusudan	5,108	4.02	N/A
Independent	Parkash Chand	460	0.36	N/A
Independent	Brij Mohan Toofan	422	0.33	N/A
Majority		44,533	35.02	▲18.26
Turnout		1,27,165	58.52	▼12.55
Indian National Congress(R) gain from ABJS		Swing		

=== 4th Lok Sabha ===
1967 Indian general election: New Delhi
Party	Candidate	Votes	%	±%
ABJS	Manohar Lal Sondhi	82,173	55.39	▲17.33
INC	Mehr Chand Khanna	57,313	38.63	▼18.03
Independent	D. Singh	2,668	1.80	N/A
Independent	Shital A. K. Dar	2,439	1.64	N/A
Independent	R. Dass	2,074	1.40	N/A
Majority		24,860	16.76	▼1.84
Turnout		1,48,359	71.07	▲6.66
ABJS gain from INC		Swing		

=== 3rd Lok Sabha ===
1962 Indian general election: New Delhi
Party	Candidate	Votes	%	±%
INC	Mehr Chand Khanna	96,264	56.66	▲19.97
ABJS	Balraj Madhok	64,669	38.06	▼7.98
Independent	Lanka Sundaram	3,786	2.23	N/A
Independent	Parkash Baghi	2,197	1.29	N/A
PSP	Tirath Dass	1,048	0.62	N/A
Majority		31,595	18.60	▼9.25
Turnout		1,73,042	64.41	▲25.09
INC gain from ABJS		Swing		

=== 2nd Lok Sabha ===
- Sucheta Kripalani (Congress)
  - Sucheta Kripalani resigned her Lok Sabha seat in 1960 and became a minister in Uttar Pradesh.

==== 2nd Lok Sabha: 1961 By Election ====
By Election, 1961: New Delhi
Party	Candidate	Votes	%	±%
ABJS	Balraj Madhok	47,184	46.04	▲24.14
INC	J. B. Singh	37,603	36.69	▼37.01
Independent	Om Prakash	10,479	10.22	N/A
Independent	Manmohini Zutshi Sahgal	5,722	5.58	N/A
Independent	Parkash Baghi	955	0.93	N/A
ABHM	H. L. Saxena	536	0.52	N/A
Majority		9,581	9.35	▼42.44
Turnout		1,02,479	39.32	▼14.58
ABJS gain from INC		Swing		

=== 1st Lok Sabha ===
1952 Indian general election: New Delhi
Party	Candidate	Votes	%	±%
KMPP	Sucheta Kripalani	47,735	46.72	
INC	Man Mohani Sehgal	40,064	39.21	
Independent	Durga Dass	6,749	6.61	
Independent	Om Prakash Gupta	3,945	3.86	
Independent	Mahant Raghubir Dass	2,025	1.98	
Independent	Ganesh Datt Bhavdu Joshi	1,657	1.62	
Majority		7,671	7.51	
Turnout		1,02,175	56.05	
KMPP win (new seat)				

== See also ==
- List of constituencies of the Lok Sabha

Lok Sabha
Preceded by Amethi	Constituency represented by the leader of the opposition 1990 – 1991	Succeeded by Gandhinagar
