= Rao ministry =

Indian union ministry

P. V. Narasimha Rao ministry
- 16th ministry of the Republic of India

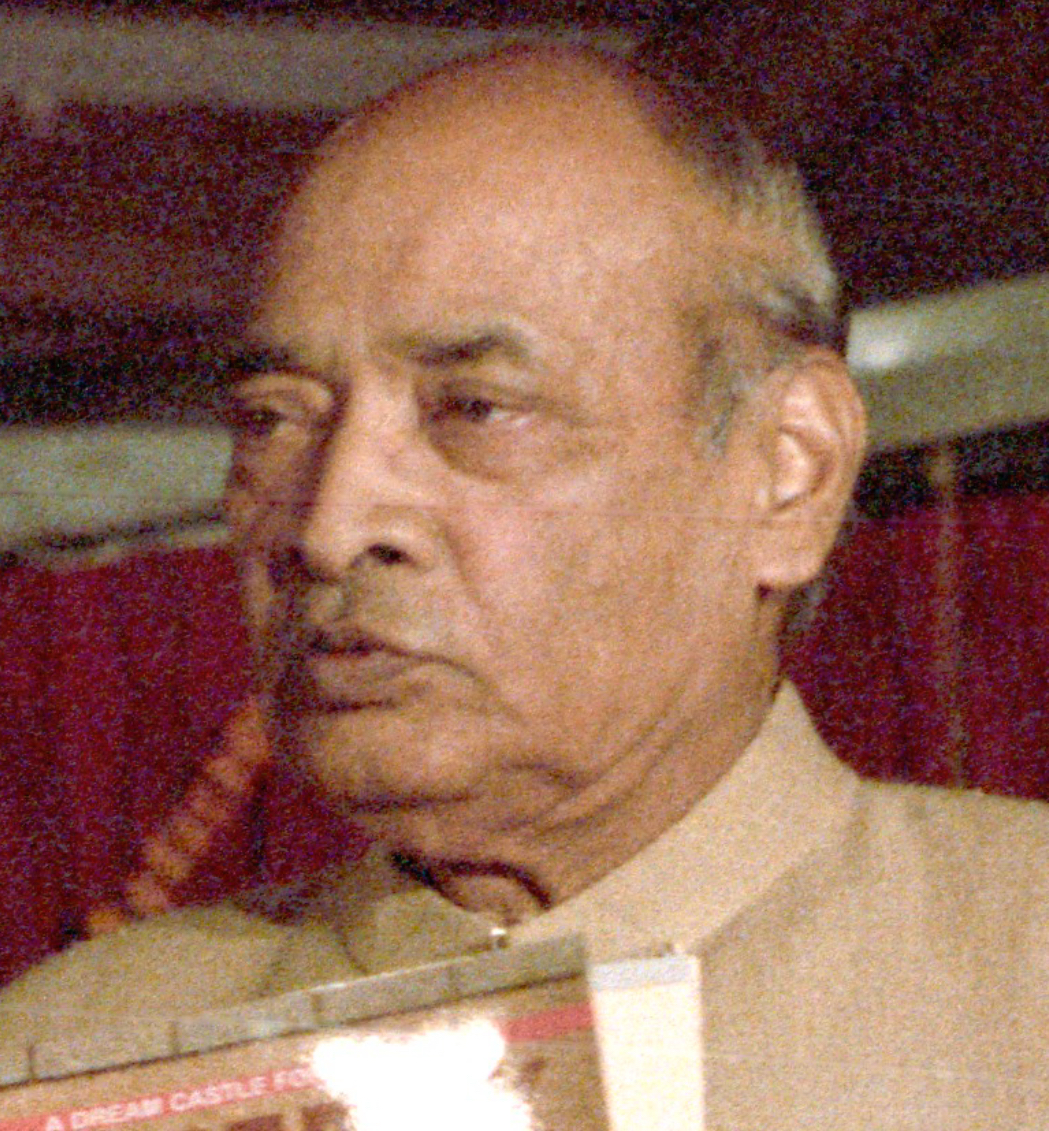
- P. V. Narasimha Rao
- Date formed: 21 June 1991
- Date dissolved: 16 May 1996

People and organisations
- Head of state: R. Venkataraman (until 25 July 1992); Shankar Dayal Sharma (from 25 July 1992)
- Head of government: P. V. Narasimha Rao
- Member party: Indian National Congress (I) (Congress alliance)
- Status in legislature: Minority
- Opposition party: Bharatiya Janata Party
- Opposition leader: L. K. Advani (21 June 1991 – 26 July 1993); Atal Bihari Vajpayee (26 July 1993 – 10 May 1996) (lok sabha); M. S. Gurupadaswamy (28 June 1991-21 July 1991) S. Jaipal Reddy (22 July 1991-29 June 1992) Sikander Bakht (7 July 1992-16 May 1996) Rajya Sabha

History
- Election: 1991
- Outgoing election: 1996
- Legislature terms: 4 years, 10 months and 25 days
- Predecessor: Chandra Shekhar ministry
- Successor: First Vajpayee ministry

P. V. Narasimha Rao was sworn in as Prime Minister of India on 21 June 1991.

== Council of Ministers ==
=== Cabinet Ministers ===
Portfolio	Minister	Took office	Left office	Party	Remarks
Prime Minister; Minister of Personnel, Public Grievances and Pensions; Minister of Science and Technology; Department of Atomic Energy; Department of Electronics; Department of Ocean Development; Department of Space; And also in-charge of all other important portfolios and policy issues not allocated to any Minister.	P. V. Narasimha Rao	21 June 1991	16 May 1996	INC(I)	
Minister of Department of Jammu and Kashmir Affairs	P. V. Narasimha Rao	1 November 1994	16 May 1996	INC(I)	Prime Minister was responsible.
Minister of Agriculture	Balram Jakhar	21 June 1991	17 January 1996	INC(I)	
Minister of Agriculture	Jagannath Mishra	7 February 1996	16 May 1996	INC(I)	
Minister of Home Affairs	Shankarrao Chavan	21 June 1991	17 January 1996	INC(I)	
Minister of Defence	P. V. Narasimha Rao	21 June 1991	26 June 1991	INC(I)	Prime Minister was responsible.
Minister of Defence	Sharad Pawar	26 June 1991	5 March 1993	INC(I)	
Minister of Defence	P. V. Narasimha Rao	5 March 1993	16 May 1996	INC	Prime Minister was responsible.
Minister of External Affairs	Madhavsinh Solanki	21 June 1991	31 March 1992	INC(I)	
Minister of External Affairs	P. V. Narasimha Rao	31 March 1992	18 January 1993	INC(I)	Prime Minister was responsible.
Minister of External Affairs	Dinesh Singh	18 January 1993	10 February 1995	INC(I)	
Minister of External Affairs	Pranab Mukherjee	10 February 1995	16 May 1996	INC(I)	
Minister of Finance	Manmohan Singh	21 June 1991	16 May 1996	INC(I)	
Minister of Human Resource Development	Arjun Singh	21 June 1991	24 December 1994	INC(I)	
Minister of Human Resource Development	P. V. Narasimha Rao	26 December 1994	10 February 1995	INC(I)	Prime Minister was responsible.
Minister of Human Resource Development	Madhavrao Scindia	10 February 1995	17 January 1996	INC(I)	
Minister of Human Resource Development	P. V. Narasimha Rao	17 January 1996	16 May 1996	INC(I)	Prime Minister was responsible.
Minister of Water Resources	Vidya Charan Shukla	21 June 1991	17 January 1996	INC(I)	
Minister of Water Resources	A. R. Antulay	17 January 1996	16 May 1996	INC(I)	
Minister of Parliamentary Affairs	Ghulam Nabi Azad	21 June 1991	17 January 1993	INC(I)	
Minister of Parliamentary Affairs	Vidya Charan Shukla	17 January 1993	17 January 1996	INC(I)	
Minister of Parliamentary Affairs	Ghulam Nabi Azad	17 January 1996	16 May 1996	INC(I)	
Minister of Railways	C. K. Jaffer Sharief	21 June 1991	17 August 1995	INC(I)	
Minister of Railways	P. V. Narasimha Rao	18 August 1995	16 May 1996	INC(I)	Prime Minister was responsible.
Minister of Health and Family Welfare	Makhan Lal Fotedar	21 June 1991	17 January 1993	INC(I)	
Minister of Health and Family Welfare	B. Shankaranand	17 January 1993	22 December 1994	INC(I)	
Minister of Health and Family Welfare	P. V. Narasimha Rao	23 December 1994	11 June 1995	INC(I)	Prime Minister was responsible.
Minister of Health and Family Welfare	A. R. Antulay	11 June 1995	16 May 1996	INC(I)	
Minister of Law, Justice and Company Affairs	Kotla Vijaya Bhaskara Reddy	21 June 1991	9 October 1992	INC(I)	
Minister of Law, Justice and Company Affairs	P. V. Narasimha Rao	9 October 1992	16 May 1996	INC(I)	Prime Minister was responsible.
Minister of Welfare	Sitaram Kesri	21 June 1991	16 May 1996	INC(I)	
Minister of Petroleum and Natural Gas	B. Shankaranand	21 June 1991	18 January 1993	INC(I)	
Minister of Petroleum and Natural Gas	Satish Sharma	18 January 1993	16 May 1996	INC(I)	Minister of State (I/C) was responsible.
Minister of Civil Aviation and Tourism	Madhavrao Scindia	21 June 1991	9 January 1993	INC(I)	
Minister of Civil Aviation and Tourism	Ghulam Nabi Azad	9 January 1993	16 May 1996	INC(I)	
Minister of Urban Development	Sheila Kaul	21 June 1991	3 May 1995	INC(I)	Renamed as Urban Affairs and Employment.
Minister of Urban Affairs and Employment	Sheila Kaul	3 May 1995	10 September 1995	INC(I)	
Minister of Urban Affairs and Employment	P. V. Narasimha Rao	10 September 1995	15 September 1995	INC(I)	Prime Minister was responsible.
Minister of Urban Affairs and Employment	R. K. Dhawan (Urban Development)	15 September 1995	21 February 1996	INC(I)	Minister of State (I/C) was responsible.
Minister of Urban Affairs and Employment	P. V. Narasimha Rao	21 February 1996	16 May 1996	INC(I)	Prime Minister was responsible.
Minister of Civil Supplies, Consumer Affairs and Public Distribution	P. V. Narasimha Rao	21 June 1991	18 January 1993	INC(I)	Prime Minister was responsible.
Minister of Civil Supplies, Consumer Affairs and Public Distribution	A. K. Antony	18 January 1993	8 February 1995	INC(I)	
Minister of Civil Supplies, Consumer Affairs and Public Distribution	Buta Singh	10 February 1995	20 February 1996	INC(I)	
Minister of Civil Supplies, Consumer Affairs and Public Distribution	P. V. Narasimha Rao	20 February 1996	16 May 1996	INC	Prime Minister was responsible.
Minister of Chemicals and Fertilizers	P. V. Narasimha Rao	21 June 1991	17 February 1994	INC(I)	Prime Minister was responsible.
Minister of Chemicals and Fertilizers	Ram Lakhan Singh Yadav	17 February 1994	16 May 1996	INC(I)	
Minister of Rural Development	P. V. Narasimha Rao	21 June 1991	11 June 1995	INC(I)	Prime Minister was responsible. Renamed as Rural Areas and Employment.
Minister of Rural Areas and Employment	Jagannath Mishra	11 June 1995	16 May 1996	INC(I)	
Minister of Industry	K. Karunakaran	11 June 1995	16 May 1996	INC(I)	
Minister of Labour	Vazhappady K. Ramamurthy	21 June 1991	30 July 1991	INC	Minister of State (I/C) was responsible.
Minister of Labour	P. V. Narasimha Rao	30 July 1991	10 July 1992	INC(I)	Prime Minister was responsible.
Minister of Labour	P. A. Sangma	10 July 1992	10 February 1995	INC(I)	Minister of State (I/C) was responsible.
Minister of Labour	P. A. Sangma	10 February 1995	15 September 1995	INC(I)	Prime Minister was responsible.
Minister of Labour	Gaddam Venkatswamy	15 September 1995	16 May 1996	INC(I)	
Minister of Food	Tarun Gogoi	21 June 1991	18 January 1993	INC(I)	Minister of State (I/C) was responsible.
Minister of Food	Kalpnath Rai	18 January 1993	21 December 1994	INC	Minister of State (I/C) was responsible.
Minister of Food	P. V. Narasimha Rao	21 December 1994	10 February 1995	INC(I)	Prime Minister was responsible.
Minister of Food	Ajit Singh	10 February 1995	16 May 1996	INC(I)	
Minister of Commerce	P. Chidambaram	21 June 1991	9 July 1992	INC(I)	Minister of State (I/C) was responsible.
Minister of Commerce	P. V. Narasimha Rao	9 July 1992	17 January 1993	INC(I)	Prime Minister was responsible.
Minister of Commerce	Pranab Mukherjee	17 January 1993	9 July 1993	INC(I)	
Minister of Commerce	Pranab Mukherjee	31 August 1993	10 February 1995	INC(I)	
Minister of Commerce	P. Chidambaram	10 February 1995	3 April 1996	INC(I)	Minister of State (I/C) was responsible.
Minister of Commerce	P. V. Narasimha Rao	3 April 1996	16 May 1996	INC	Prime Minister was responsible.
Minister of Information and Broadcasting	Ajit Kumar Panja	21 June 1991	18 January 1993	INC(I)	Minister of State (I/C) was responsible.
Minister of Information and Broadcasting	Kamakhya Prasad Singh Deo	18 January 1993	15 September 1995	INC(I)	Minister of State (I/C) was responsible.
Minister of Information and Broadcasting	P. A. Sangma	15 September 1995	16 May 1996	INC(I)	
Minister of Power	Kalpnath Rai	21 June 1991	18 January 1993	INC(I)	Minister of State (I/C) was responsible.
Minister of Power	N. K. P. Salve	18 January 1993	16 May 1996	INC(I)	
Minister of Non-Conventional Energy Sources	Kalpnath Rai	21 June 1991	2 July 1992	INC(I)	Minister of State (I/C) was responsible.
Minister of Non-Conventional Energy Sources	P. V. Narasimha Rao	2 July 1992	16 May 1996	INC(I)	Prime Minister was responsible.
Minister of Textiles	Ashok Gehlot	21 June 1991	17 January 1993	INC(I)	Minister of State (I/C) was responsible.
Minister of Textiles	Gaddam Venkatswamy	18 January 1993	10 February 1995	INC(I)	Minister of State (I/C) was responsible.
Minister of Textiles	Gaddam Venkatswamy	10 February 1995	15 September 1995	INC(I)	
Minister of Textiles	Kamal Nath	15 September 1995	20 February 1996	INC(I)	Minister of State (I/C) was responsible.
Minister of Textiles	Gaddam Venkatswamy	20 February 1996	16 May 1996	INC(I)	
Minister without portfolio	Dinesh Singh	10 February 1995	30 November 1995	INC(I)	Died in office.
Minister without portfolio	C. K. Jaffer Sharief	17 August 1995	22 November 1995	INC(I)	

=== Ministers of State (Independent Charge) ===
Portfolio	Minister	Took office	Left office	Party
Minister of State (Independent Charge) of Planning and Programme Implementation	H. R. Bhardwaj	21 June 1991	2 July 1992	INC(I)
Minister of State (Independent Charge) of Planning and Programme Implementation	Sukh Ram	2 July 1992	17 January 1993	INC(I)
Minister of State (Independent Charge) of Planning and Programme Implementation	Giridhar Gamang	17 January 1993	5 September 1995	INC(I)
Minister of State (Independent Charge) of Planning and Programme Implementation	Balram Singh Yadav	5 September 1995	16 May 1996	INC(I)
Minister of State (Independent Charge) of Steel	Santosh Mohan Dev	21 June 1991	16 May 1996	INC(I)
Minister of State (Independent Charge) of Coal	P. A. Sangma	21 June 1991	18 January 1993	INC(I)
Minister of State (Independent Charge) of Coal	Ajit Kumar Panja	18 January 1993	13 September 1995	INC(I)
Minister of State (Independent Charge) of Coal	Jagdish Tytler	13 September 1995	16 May 1996	INC(I)
Minister of State (Independent Charge) of Mines	Balram Singh Yadav	21 June 1991	15 September 1995	INC(I)
Minister of State (Independent Charge) of Mines	Giridhar Gamang	15 September 1995	16 May 1996	INC(I)
Minister of State (Independent Charge) of Surface Transport	Jagdish Tytler	21 June 1991	15 September 1995	INC(I)
Minister of State (Independent Charge) of Surface Transport	M. Rajasekara Murthy	15 September 1995	16 May 1996	INC(I)
Minister of State (Independent Charge) of Environment and Forests	Kamal Nath	21 June 1991	15 September 1995	INC(I)
Minister of State (Independent Charge) of Environment and Forests	Rajesh Pilot	15 September 1995	16 May 1996	INC(I)
Minister of State (Independent Charge) of Food Processing Industries	Giridhar Gamang	21 June 1991	17 January 1993	INC(I)
Minister of State (Independent Charge) of Food Processing Industries	Tarun Gogoi	18 January 1993	13 September 1995	INC(I)
Minister of State (Independent Charge) of Food Processing Industries	Kamakhya Prasad Singh Deo	15 September 1995	16 May 1996	INC(I)
Minister of State (Independent Charge) of Communications	Rajesh Pilot	21 June 1991	18 January 1993	INC(I)
Minister of State (Independent Charge) of Communications	Sukh Ram	18 January 1993	16 May 1996	INC(I)

=== Ministers of State ===
Portfolio	Minister	Took office	Left office	Party	Remarks
Minister of State in the Ministry of Personnel, Public Grievances and Pensions	Margaret Alva	21 June 1991	16 May 1996	INC(I)	
Minister of State in the Ministry of External Affairs	Eduardo Faleiro	21 June 1991	18 January 1993	INC(I)	
Minister of State in the Ministry of External Affairs	R. L. Bhatia	2 July 1992	16 May 1996	INC(I)	
Minister of State in the Ministry of External Affairs	Salman Khurshid	18 January 1993	16 May 1996	INC(I)	
Minister of State in the Ministry of Home Affairs	M. M. Jacob	21 June 1991	17 January 1993	INC(I)	
Minister of State in the Ministry of Home Affairs	Rajesh Pilot (Internal Security)	18 January 1993	15 September 1995	INC(I)	
Minister of State in the Ministry of Home Affairs	P. M. Sayeed	19 January 1993	15 September 1995	INC(I)	
Minister of State in the Ministry of Home Affairs	Ram Lal Rahi	15 September 1995	16 May 1996	INC(I)	
Minister of State in the Ministry of Home Affairs	Meijinlung Kamson	15 September 1995	16 May 1996	INC(I)	
Minister of State in the Ministry of Home Affairs	Syed Sibtey Razi	15 September 1995	16 May 1996	INC(I)	
Minister of State in the Ministry of Finance	Chaudhary Dalbir Singh	21 June 1991	17 January 1993	INC(I)	
Minister of State in the Ministry of Finance	Shantaram Potdukhe	21 June 1991	17 January 1993	INC(I)	
Minister of State in the Ministry of Finance	Rameshwar Thakur	26 June 1991	18 January 1993	INC(I)	
Minister of State in the Ministry of Finance	M. V. Chandrashekara Murthy	18 January 1993	16 May 1996	INC(I)	
Minister of State in the Ministry of Finance	Abrar Ahmed	18 January 1993	2 April 1994	INC(I)	
Minister of State in the Ministry of Finance	Debi Prasad Pal	15 September 1995	16 May 1996	INC(I)	
Minister of State in the Ministry of Defence	S. Krishna Kumar	26 June 1991	18 January 1993	INC(I)	
Minister of State in the Ministry of Defence	Mallikarjun Goud	18 January 1993	19 January 1995	INC(I)	
Minister of State in the Ministry of Defence	Mallikarjun Goud (Defence)	19 September 1995	16 May 1996	INC(I)	
Minister of State in the Ministry of Defence	Suresh Pachouri (Defence Production and Supplies)	15 September 1995	16 May 1996	INC(I)	
Minister of State in the Ministry of Defence	Mallikarjun Goud (Defence Research and Development)	30 September 1995	16 May 1996	INC(I)	
Minister of State in the Ministry of Human Resource Development	Mamata Banerjee (Youth Affairs and Sports)	21 June 1991	17 January 1993	INC(I)	
Minister of State in the Ministry of Human Resource Development	Mukul Wasnik (Youth Affairs and Sports)	18 January 1993	16 May 1996	INC(I)	
Minister of State in the Ministry of Human Resource Development	Selja Kumari (Education and Culture)	15 September 1995	16 May 1996	INC(I)	
Minister of State in the Ministry of Human Resource Development	Krupasindhu Bhoi (Education)	15 September 1995	16 May 1996	INC(I)	
Minister of State in the Ministry of Welfare	Mamata Banerjee (Women and Child Development)	21 June 1991	17 January 1993	INC(I)	
Minister of State in the Ministry of Welfare	Basavarajeshwari (Women and Child Development)	18 January 1993	15 September 1995	INC(I)	
Minister of State in the Ministry of Welfare	Vimla Verma (Women and Child Development)	15 September 1995	16 May 1996	INC(I)	
Minister of State in the Ministry of Welfare	Aslam Sher Khan	15 September 1995	16 May 1996	INC(I)	
Minister of State in the Ministry of Parliamentary Affairs	P. R. Kumaramangalam	21 June 1991	2 December 1993	INC(I)	
Minister of State in the Ministry of Parliamentary Affairs	M. M. Jacob	21 June 1991	17 January 1993	INC(I)	
Minister of State in the Ministry of Parliamentary Affairs	Abrar Ahmed	18 January 1993	2 April 1994	INC(I)	
Minister of State in the Ministry of Parliamentary Affairs	Margaret Alva	19 January 1993	16 May 1996	INC(I)	
Minister of State in the Ministry of Parliamentary Affairs	Mukul Wasnik	19 January 1993	16 May 1996	INC(I)	
Minister of State in the Ministry of Parliamentary Affairs	Eduardo Faleiro	18 December 1993	19 September 1995	INC(I)	
Minister of State in the Ministry of Parliamentary Affairs	Rameshwar Thakur	17 April 1994	22 December 1994	INC(I)	
Minister of State in the Ministry of Parliamentary Affairs	Mallikarjun Goud	17 April 1994	16 May 1996	INC(I)	
Minister of State in the Ministry of Parliamentary Affairs	Matang Sinh	10 February 1995	16 May 1996	INC(I)	
Minister of State in the Ministry of Parliamentary Affairs	Vilas Muttemwar	15 September 1995	16 May 1996	INC(I)	
Minister of State in the Ministry of Law, Justice and Company Affairs	P. R. Kumaramangalam	21 June 1991	2 July 1992	INC(I)	
Minister of State in the Ministry of Law, Justice and Company Affairs	H. R. Bhardwaj	2 July 1992	16 May 1996	INC(I)	
Minister of State in the Ministry of Railways	Mallikarjun Goud	21 June 1991	18 January 1993	INC(I)	
Minister of State in the Ministry of Railways	Kahnu Charan Lenka	18 January 1993	2 April 1994	INC(I)	
Minister of State in the Ministry of Railways	Mallikarjun Goud	21 August 1995	19 September 1995	INC(I)	
Minister of State in the Ministry of Railways	Suresh Kalmadi	15 September 1995	16 May 1996	INC(I)	
Minister of State in the Ministry of Agriculture	Kahnu Charan Lenka	21 June 1991	18 January 1993	INC(I)	
Minister of State in the Ministry of Agriculture	Mullappally Ramachandran	21 June 1991	17 January 1993	INC(I)	
Minister of State in the Ministry of Agriculture	Arvind Netam	18 January 1993	20 February 1996	INC(I)	
Minister of State in the Ministry of Agriculture	S. Krishna Kumar	19 February 1993	13 September 1995	INC(I)	
Minister of State in the Ministry of Agriculture	Mohd. Ayub Khan	15 September 1995	16 May 1996	INC(I)	
Minister of State in the Ministry of Health and Family Welfare	Taradevi Siddhartha	26 June 1991	18 January 1993	INC(I)	
Minister of State in the Ministry of Health and Family Welfare	K. V. Thangkabalu	19 January 1993	16 May 1996	INC(I)	
Minister of State in the Ministry of Health and Family Welfare	C. Silvera	17 January 1994	15 September 1995	INC(I)	
Minister of State in the Ministry of Health and Family Welfare	Paban Singh Ghatowar (Indian System of Medicines and Homoeopathy)	15 September 1995	16 May 1996	INC(I)	
Minister of State in the Ministry of Chemicals and Fertilizers	Chinta Mohan	26 June 1991	17 January 1993	INC(I)	
Minister of State in the Ministry of Chemicals and Fertilizers	Eduardo Faleiro	18 January 1993	16 May 1996	INC(I)	
Minister of State in the Ministry of Urban Development	M. Arunachalam	26 June 1991	18 January 1993	INC(I)	
Minister of State in the Ministry of Urban Affairs and Employment	Prem Khandu Thungan	18 January 1993	13 September 1995	INC(I)	
Minister of State in the Ministry of Urban Affairs and Employment	S. S. Ahluwalia (Urban Employment and Poverty; Allevation)	15 September 1995	8 March 1996	INC(I)	
Minister of State in the Ministry of Urban Affairs and Employment	S. S. Ahluwalia	8 March 1996	6 May 1996	INC(I)	
Minister of State in the Ministry of Rural Development	Gaddam Venkatswamy	21 June 1991	2 July 1992	INC(I)	
Minister of State in the Ministry of Rural Development	Uttambhai Patel	21 June 1991	2 July 1992	INC(I)	
Minister of State in the Ministry of Rural Development	Gaddam Venkatswamy (Rural Development)	2 July 1992	18 January 1993	INC(I)	
Minister of State in the Ministry of Rural Development	Uttambhai Patel (Rural Development)	2 July 1992	11 June 1995	INC(I)	Renamed as Rural Areas and Employment.
Minister of State in the Ministry of Rural Development	Rao Ram Singh (Wasteland Development)	2 July 1992	11 June 1995	INC(I)	Renamed as Rural Areas and Employment.
Minister of State in the Ministry of Rural Development	Rameshwar Thakur (Rural Development)	18 January 1993	22 December 1994	INC(I)	
Minister of State in the Ministry of Rural Areas and Employment	Uttambhai Patel (Rural Development)	11 June 1995	16 May 1996	INC(I)	
Minister of State in the Ministry of Rural Areas and Employment	Rao Ram Singh (Wasteland Development)	11 June 1995	16 May 1996	INC(I)	
Minister of State in the Ministry of Rural Areas and Employment	Vilas Muttemwar (Rural Employment and Poverty; Alleviation)	15 September 1995	16 May 1996	INC(I)	
Minister of State in the Ministry of Civil Supplies, Consumer Affairs and Public Distribution	Kamaluddin Ahmed	21 June 1991	29 September 1994	INC	
Minister of State in the Ministry of Civil Supplies, Consumer Affairs and Public Distribution	Krishna Sahi	15 September 1995	19 September 1995	INC(I)	
Minister of State in the Ministry of Civil Supplies, Consumer Affairs and Public Distribution	Venod Sharma	15 September 1995	19 September 1995	INC(I)	
Minister of State in the Ministry of Civil Supplies, Consumer Affairs and Public Distribution	Krishna Sahi (Civil Supplies)	19 September 1995	16 May 1996	INC(I)	
Minister of State in the Ministry of Civil Supplies, Consumer Affairs and Public Distribution	Venod Sharma (Consumer Affairs and Public; Distribution)	19 September 1995	16 May 1996	INC(I)	
Minister of State in the Ministry of Civil Aviation	M. O. H. Farook	21 June 1991	2 July 1992	INC(I)	
Minister of State in the Ministry of Civil Aviation	M. O. H. Farook (Civil Aviation)	2 July 1992	17 January 1993	INC(I)	
Minister of State in the Ministry of Civil Aviation	Sukhbans Kaur Bhinder (Tourism)	2 July 1992	16 May 1995	INC(I)	
Minister of State in the Ministry of Civil Aviation	G. Y. Krishnan (Civil Aviation)	15 September 1995	16 May 1996	INC(I)	
Minister of State in the Ministry of Petroleum and Natural Gas	S. Krishna Kumar	21 June 1991	18 January 1993	INC(I)	
Minister of State in the Ministry of Industry	P. J. Kurien	21 June 1991	2 July 1992	INC(I)	
Minister of State in the Ministry of Industry	P. J. Kurien (Small Scale, Agro and Rural; Industries)	2 July 1992	17 January 1993	INC(I)	
Minister of State in the Ministry of Industry	Prem Khandu Thungan (Heavy Industry and Public; Enterprises)	2 July 1992	18 January 1993	INC(I)	
Minister of State in the Ministry of Industry	Krishna Sahi (Industrial Development)	2 July 1992	15 September 1995	INC(I)	
Minister of State in the Ministry of Industry	M. Arunachalam (Small Scale, Agro and Rural; Industries)	18 January 1993	3 April 1996	INC(I)	
Minister of State in the Ministry of Industry	Krishna Sahi (Heavy Industries)	19 February 1993	15 September 1995	INC(I)	
Minister of State in the Ministry of Industry	C. Silvera	15 September 1995	16 May 1996	INC(I)	
Minister of State in the Ministry of Commerce and Industry	Prem Khandu Thungan	21 June 1991	2 July 1992	INC(I)	
Minister of State in the Ministry of Commerce	P. J. Kurien	10 July 1992	17 January 1993	INC(I)	
Minister of State in the Ministry of Commerce	Kamaluddin Ahmed	19 January 1993	29 September 1994	INC(I)	
Minister of State in the Ministry of Science and Technology	P. R. Kumaramangalam (Electronics, Ocean Development)	2 July 1992	2 December 1993	INC(I)	
Minister of State in the Ministry of Science and Technology	Bhuvnesh Chaturvedi	2 December 1993	16 May 1996	INC(I)	
Minister of State in the Ministry of Science and Technology	Eduardo Faleiro (Electronics, Ocean Development)	18 December 1993	16 May 1996	INC(I)	
Minister of State in the Ministry of Non-Conventional Energy Sources	Sukh Ram	2 July 1992	18 January 1993	INC(I)	
Minister of State in the Ministry of Non-Conventional Energy Sources	S. Krishna Kumar	18 January 1993	13 September 1995	INC(I)	
Minister of State in the Ministry of Non-Conventional Energy Sources	P. J. Kurien	15 September 1995	16 May 1996	INC(I)	
Minister of State in the Prime Minister's Office	Bhuvnesh Chaturvedi	18 January 1993	16 May 1996	INC(I)	
Minister of State in the Prime Minister's Office	Aslam Sher Khan	15 September 1995	16 May 1995	INC(I)	
Minister of State in the Ministry of Power	P. V. Rangayya Naidu	18 January 1993	10 February 1995	INC(I)	
Minister of State in the Ministry of Power	Urmilaben Chimanbhai Patel	10 February 1995	16 May 1995	INC(I)	
Minister of State in the Ministry of Water Resources	Prem Khandu Thungan	19 January 1993	10 February 1995	INC(I)	
Minister of State in the Ministry of Water Resources	P. V. Rangayya Naidu	10 February 1995	16 May 1995	INC(I)	
Minister of State in the Department of Atomic Energy; Minister of State in the Department of Space	Bhuvnesh Chaturvedi	16 February 1993	16 May 1996	INC(I)	
Minister of State in the Ministry of Information and Broadcasting	P. M. Sayeed	15 September 1995	16 May 1996	INC(I)	

=== Deputy Ministers ===
Portfolio	Minister	Took office	Left office	Party
Deputy Minister in the Ministry of Commerce	Salman Khurshid	21 June 1991	18 January 1993	INC(I)
Deputy Minister in the Ministry of Information and Broadcasting	Girija Vyas	21 June 1991	17 January 1993	INC(I)
Deputy Minister in the Ministry of Labour	Paban Singh Ghatowar	21 June 1991	18 January 1993	INC(I)
Deputy Minister in the Ministry of Home Affairs	Ram Lal Rahi	21 June 1991	15 September 1995	INC(I)
Deputy Minister in the Ministry of Communications	P. V. Rangayya Naidu	21 June 1991	18 January 1993	INC(I)
Deputy Minister in the Ministry of Welfare	Kamla Kumari	21 June 1991	17 January 1993	INC(I)
Deputy Minister in the Ministry of Coal	Siddu Nyamagouda	26 June 1991	17 January 1993	INC(I)
Deputy Minister in the Ministry of Human Resource Development	Selja Kumari; Education and Culture)	2 July 1992	15 September 1995	INC(I)
Deputy Minister in the Ministry of Health and Family Welfare	Paban Singh Ghatowar	18 January 1993	15 September 1995	INC(I)
