= Jagmohan =

Indian politician and civil servant (1927–2021)

Jagmohan Malhotra
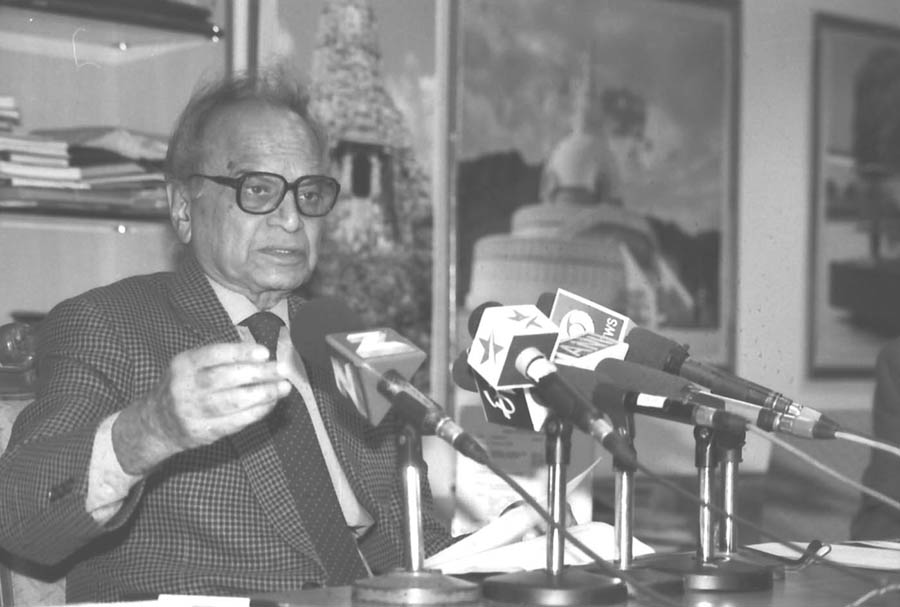
- Jagmohan in 2004

5th Governor of Jammu and Kashmir
- In office 19 January 1990 – 26 May 1990
- Preceded by: K. V. Krishna Rao
- Succeeded by: Girish Chandra Saxena
- In office 26 April 1984 – 11 July 1989
- Preceded by: Braj Kumar Nehru
- Succeeded by: K. V. Krishna Rao

6th Lieutenant Governor of Delhi
- In office 2 September 1982 – 25 April 1984
- Preceded by: Sundar Lal Khurana
- Succeeded by: P. G. Gavai
- In office 17 February 1980 – 30 March 1981
- Preceded by: Dalip Rai Kohli
- Succeeded by: Sundar Lal Khurana

9th Lieutenant Governor of Goa, Daman and Diu
- In office 31 March 1981 – 29 August 1982
- Preceded by: P. S. Gill
- Succeeded by: I. H. Latif

Personal details
- Born: 25 September 1927 Hafizabad, Punjab, British India
- Died: 3 May 2021 (aged 93) Delhi, India
- Spouse: Uma Jagmohan
- Children: Deepika Kapoor, Manmohan
- Awards: Padma Vibhushan (2016); Padma Bhushan (1977); Padma Shri (1971)

Jagmohan Malhotra (25 September 1927 – 3 May 2021), known by the mononym Jagmohan, was an Indian civil servant and politician. After working with the Indian National Congress, he joined the Bharatiya Janata Party in 1995. He served as Lieutenant Governor of Delhi and Goa, as the 5th Governor of Jammu and Kashmir, and for three terms as Member of Parliament for New Delhi. In the cabinet, he served as Union Minister for Urban Development and Tourism.

== Early life ==
Jagmohan Malhotra was born in a Punjabi Hindu Khatri family to Amir Chand and Dropadi Devi on 25 September 1927 in Hafizabad, British India. He got married in 1957 to Uma, who came to be known as Uma Jagmohan.

== Career ==
Jagmohan admired Georges-Eugene Haussmann. Jagmohan first gained notoriety during his stint as vice-chairman of the Delhi Development Authority in the mid-1970s. During this time he grew close to Sanjay Gandhi, who functioned as an informal advisor to his mother, Prime Minister Indira Gandhi. During the Emergency (1975–77), Sanjay Gandhi entrusted Jagmohan with the "beautification" of Delhi, a task that involved large-scale demolition of slums. Jagmohan was very effective with the task. Already a Padma Shri since 1971, he was awarded the Padma Bhushan in 1977.

In 1982, as Delhi hosted the Asian Games, Jagmohan was serving his second term as Lieutenant Governor of the city. The games were a success and Jagmohan's capable administration received credit. Later Delhi hosted the Non-Aligned Summit, which was also a success.

=== Governor of Jammu and Kashmir ===
During his tenure as Governor of Jammu and Kashmir (1984–89), the 1986 Kashmir Riots had taken place, curfew was imposed, media was banned and state force was used relentlessly. Pakistan's prime minister Benazir Bhutto in a series of speeches notoriously threatened to make him "Bhagmohan" (Bhag meaning "run", implying he would flee out of fear), and that "Ham us ko Jag-Jag Mo-Mo Han-Han bana denge" (transl."We will make him Jag-Jag Mo-Mo Han-Han", implying he would be cut/torn to pieces by militants). In Jammu and Kashmir, Jagmohan is credited with bringing order to one of the most revered shrines of Hindus, called Mata Vaishno Devi. He created a board that continues to provide administration for the shrine. Infrastructure was developed and that continues to facilitate pilgrims.

In 1990, when militancy re-exploded in Kashmir, Jagmohan was re-appointed its governor by Prime Minister V. P. Singh's led Janta Dal government. He fell out of favour with the Union government, and joined the BJP around 1994. However, allegations persist that he was involved in extra-legal crackdowns in Kashmir engineered by Mufti Mohammad Sayeed.

== Electoral history ==
Jagmohan contested the seat for New Delhi in the Lok Sabha in 1996 for the 11th Lok Sabha, where he defeated Bollywood star Rajesh Khanna by 58,000 votes. In 1998 and 1999, Jagmohan won the seat again defeating R. K. Dhawan of the Indian National Congress twice.

=== In BJP Government ===
When the BJP's Atal Bihari Vajpayee became Prime Minister in 1998, Jagmohan served in his cabinet in a variety of portfolios, including communications, urban development and tourism. During the 1990s, Jagmohan had served as a nominated MP in the Rajya Sabha in 1990–96, and won three Lok Sabha elections from New Delhi in 1996, 1998 and 1999.

In 2004, he lost to Ajay Maken of the Indian National Congress by 12,784 votes.

In 2019, Jagmohan participated in BJP's outreach campaign to increase awareness about the advantages of revoking Article 370 and 35A.

== Awards and honours ==
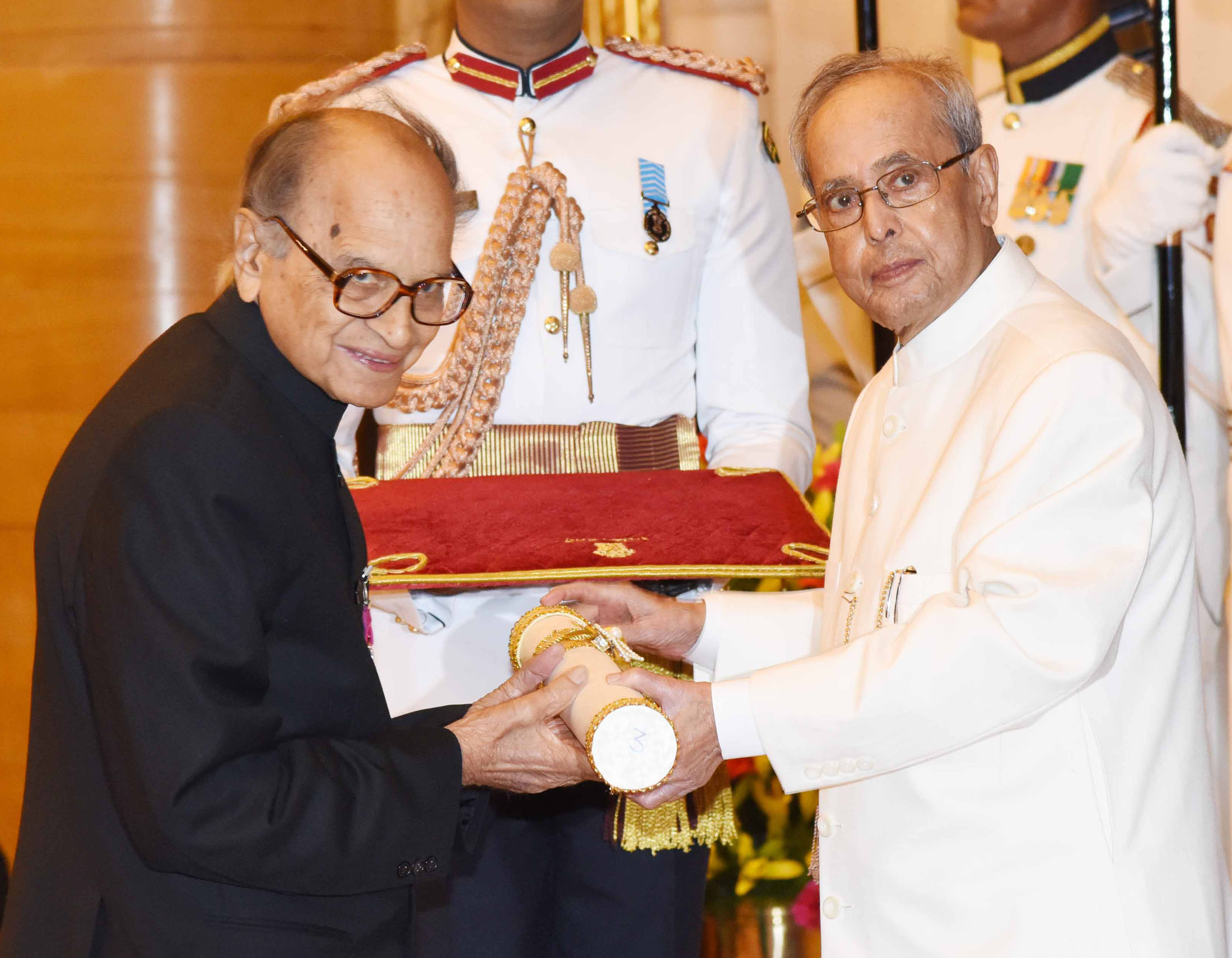
The President, Shri Pranab Mukherjee presenting the Padma Vibhushan Award to Shri Jagmohan, at a Civil Investiture Ceremony, at Rashtrapati Bhavan, in New Delhi on 28 March 2016

On the basis of his service record and recommendations made by top civil servants, he was honoured, on 26 January 1971, with the award of Padma Shri by the President of India, "for formulation and implementation of the Delhi Master Plan and for playing a pioneering role in planning and implementation of projects in Delhi".

With a meager revolving fund of just Rs. Five crore, Jagmohan launched large number of land acquisition and development schemes, showcasing how development effort could be financed by creating facilities – thus increasing value of the state land resources. For a series of innovations of this genre, good management skills, and for "his meritorious services to the country" he was awarded Padma Bhushan in 1977. In 2016, Padma Vibhushan was awarded to him. As Implementation Commissioner, and later as vice-chairman, Delhi Development Authority, Jagmohan executed various Parliament approved schemes of Clearance-cum-Resettlement-cum-Redevelopment, which critics called demolition drives.

Jagmohan was one of the founders of the Samkalp Foundation which provides civil services examination coaching to poor and marginal students along with accommodation and other facilities. He wrote "My Frozen Turbulence in Kashmir".

== Death ==
Jagmohan Malhotra died in Delhi on 3 May 2021, at the age of 93.

== Positions held ==
- 1980–81: Lt. Governor, Delhi (two times)
- 1981–82: Lt. Governor, Goa, Daman and Diu
- 1984–89 and 1990 (Jan - May): Governor, Jammu and Kashmir (two times)
- 1990–96: Member (nominated), Rajya Sabha

During the 1990s, Jagmohan had served as nominated MP in the Rajya Sabha (the upper house of the Indian Parliament) from 1990 to 1996. Later, he was elected to the Lok Sabha (the lower house of the Indian Parliament) thrice from New Delhi.

- 1996: Elected to 11th Lok Sabha from New Delhi
- 1998: Re-elected to 12th Lok Sabha (2nd term) from New Delhi
- 1998-December: Union Cabinet Minister, Communications
- 1999-June–October: Union Cabinet Minister, Urban Development
- 1999: Re-elected to 13th Lok Sabha (3rd term) from New Delhi
- 1999-October–November: Union Cabinet Minister, Urban Development
- 2001-September: Union Cabinet Minister, Tourism
- 2001-November-2004-April: Union Cabinet Minister, Tourism and Culture

== Books authored ==
- Rebuilding Shahjahanabad, the Walled City of Delhi (1975)
- Island of Truth (1978)
- My Frozen Turbulence in Kashmir (1993)
- The Challenge of Our Cities (1984)
- Soul and Structure of Governance in India (2005)
- Reforming Vaishno Devi and a Case for Reformed, Reawakened and Enlightened Hinduism (2010)
- Triumphs and Tragedies of Ninth Delhi (2015)

== Bibliography ==
- Joshi, Manoj (1999), The Lost Rebellion, Penguin Books, ISBN 978-0-14-027846-0
