= 1992 New Delhi by-election =

1992 New Delhi Lok Sabha seat by-election

Candidate	Rajesh Khanna	Shatrughan Sinha
Party	INC	BJP

In June 1992 a by-election was held for the New Delhi seat in the Lok Sabha (lower house of the parliament of India). The by-election was called after the resignation of the incumbent Member of Parliament L.K. Advani.

== Background ==
Bharatiya Janata Party leader Advani had won the New Delhi Lok Sabha seat in the 1989 and 1991 general elections. However, Advani had also won the Gandhinagar Lok Sabha seat in Gujarat in 1991, and thus opted to resign from the New Delhi seat.

The by-election was originally scheduled for November 1991, but was countermanded after the death of candidate Mukesh Kumar Garg of Kanpur.

== Candidates ==
A whopping 125 candidates contested the by-election. The two main candidates were Bollywood star actors. The Indian National Congress fielded film star Rajesh Khanna as their candidate in the by-election. Khanna had contested against Advani in the 1991 election in New Delhi, and lost by a mere 1,589 votes. In the 1992 by-election his main opponent was another actor, Shatrughan Sinha of the BJP. Sinha, nicknamed 'Shotgun', had campaigned for the non-Congress opposition in the 1989, but without affiliating with any party at the time. In his 1992 campaign Sinha adopted a tough stance against Khanna and Prime Minister P.V. Narasimha Rao, challenging the Congress government on election promises made in the 1991 campaign. India Today compared his election rhetoric to his performance as the rogue Chhannoo in the 1971 hit Mere Apne. BJP leaders campaigning on behalf of Sinha included Uma Bharti, Madan Lal Khurana, and Vijay Kumar Malhotra. Advani was notably absent from the campaign.

Khanna's campaigners included H.K.L. Bhagat, R.K. Dhawan, and Vidya Charan Shukla. It was reported that H.K.L. Bhagat had also sought the Congress nomination for the by-election.

The wives of the two contending film stars, Dimple Kapadia and Poonam Sinha, played a prominent role in mobilizing crowds for their husband's campaign rallies.

Jai Bhagwan Jatav stood as the Janata Dal candidate in the by-election. Jatav was expected to do well amongst Muslim voters. In the buildup to the demolition of the Babri Masjid later in 1992, Muslims tended to perceive P.V. Narasimha Rao's Congress as taking a soft stance on the advance of the Hindutva movement.

Independent candidate Phoolan Devi, known internationally as the 'Bandit Queen', was in jail at the time of the by-election. Devi had been imprisoned without trial since 1983 on around 50 charges, including murder.

== Result ==
Candidate	Party	Votes	%
Rajesh Khanna	Indian National Congress	101,625	52.51
Shatrughan Sinha	Bharatiya Janata Party	73,369	37.91
J.B. Jatav	Janata Dal	10,638	5.50
S. Kumar	Independent	1,135	0.59
Phoolan Devi	Independent	753	0.39
Y. Qureshi	Independent	518	0.27
G. Singh	Independent	450	0.23
H. Raj	Independent	282	0.15
N. Singh	Independent	208	0.11
H.S. Gill	RJMP	186	0.10
M.C. Malhotra	Independent	178	0.09
N.K. Verma	CP	174	0.09
R. Kumar	Independent	169	0.09
A.S. Chaprana	Independent	144	0.07
R.C. Jain	HNP	132	0.07
J. Bhagwan	Independent	115	0.06
S. Chand	Independent	114	0.06
V. Davind	Independent	107	0.06
Allauddin	Independent	103	0.05
V.N. Tripathi	Independent	103	0.05
S.P.S. Ahluwalia	Independent	99	0.05
R. Kumar	Independent	98	0.05
Gulshan	Independent	97	0.05
I.P. Singh	SP	92	0.05
S.C. Saxena	Independent	91	0.05
S. Singh	Independent	86	0.04
R. K. Shukla	Independent	80	0.04
S. Kumar	Independent	72	0.04
M. Gupta	Independent	71	0.04
H. C. Rana	Independent	65	0.03
S. Lal	Independent	61	0.03
M. Gupta	Independent	60	0.03
V.S. Tripathi	Socialist Party (Ramakant Pandey)	52	0.03
K. Lal	Independent	50	0.03
Bhagirath	Independent	50	0.03
Mohammed Bilal	Independent	50	0.03
N. Kumar	Independent	49	0.03
R. Prakash	Independent	48	0.02
S. Pal	ABDND	48	0.02
A. Pathak	LD	46	0.02
S. S. Rathi	PRP	46	0.02
A. Thakur	Independent	44	0.02
R. N. Shastri	ABBDP	44	0.02
M. Mo. A. Hussain	Independent	42	0.02
S. Vayas	Independent	41	0.02
A. Kumar	Independent	39	0.02
N. Kishore	Independent	38	0.02
K. K. Babbar	Independent	37	0.02
S. Sachdevga	Independent	35	0.02
A. Nath	Independent	33	0.02
G. Krishna	Independent	33	0.02
Arun	Independent	32	0.02
P.C. Jain	Akhand Bharat Mahasang Sarvahara Krantikari Party	32	0.02
V. Kumar	Independent	32	0.02
N. S. M. Nayyar	Independent	31	0.02
G. Singh	Independent	28	0.01
R. K. Mittal	Independent	28	0.01
S. Parkash	Independent	28	0.01
R. S. Bedi	Independent	26	0.01
B. D. Bhart	Independent	26	0.01
S. Lal	Independent	26	0.01
M. Lal	Independent	25	0.01
Dr. A.Q. Burni	Independent	24	0.01
P. P. Verma	Independent	24	0.01
Mohammed Adil	Independent	24	0.01
K. D. Mishra	Independent	23	0.01
C. L. Balmiki	Independent	23	0.01
B. Mukand	Independent	23	0.01
S. Ram	Independent	23	0.01
O. alias Charrawala	Independent	22	0.01
R. R. Dubey alias R. Gandhi	Independent	22	0.01
K. K. Virmani	Independent	21	0.01
Sanjay	Independent	21	0.01
D. D. Suri	Independent	20	0.01
G. Bhai	Independent	19	0.01
K. K. Dogra	Independent	19	0.01
B. Pal	Independent	19	0.01
Mahabir	Independent	19	0.01
R. K. Bajaj	Independent	19	0.01
V. Gupta	Independent	19	0.01
C. Prakash	Independent	18	0.01
KM. J. Carunia	Independent	18	0.01
Mohammed. H. Sagar	Independent	18	0.01
Dr. S.P. Gupta	Independent	17	0.01
J. Saxena	Independent	17	0.01
D. Sharma	Independent	17	0.01
N. Singh	Independent	17	0.01
S. I. Prakash	Independent	17	0.01
E. Imamy	Independent	16	0.01
C. Bhan	Independent	16	0.01
D. Gupta	Independent	16	0.01
R. R. Gurusarwala	Independent	16	0.01
R. Kumar	Independent	16	0.01
D. Dass	Independent	15	0.01
B. Bari	Independent	15	0.01
R.K. Rahi	Independent	15	0.01
C.R.R. Chugh	Independent	15	0.01
V. Singh	Independent	15	0.01
C. B. L. Saxena	Jan Ekta Morcha	15	0.01
H. S. Dhillon	Independent	15	0.01
A. Shahani	Independent	14	0.01
G. C. Paniala	Independent	14	0.01
A. Jain (W)	Independent	12	0.01
D. Kumar	Independent	12	0.01
Pt. C. P. Sharma	Bharatiya Lok Tantrik Mazdoor Dal	12	0.01
K. J. S. Urf D. Pakad	Independent	12	0.01
U. Goel	Independent	11	0.01
B. Bharti	Independent	11	0.01
T. Sial	Independent	10	0.01
B. B. Goswami	Independent	10	0.01
A. Mehmood	Independent	9	0.00
Rattan	Independent	9	0.00
S. M. Ahmed	Independent	9	0.00
G. K. Khanna	Independent	8	0.00
P. Tolani	Independent	8	0.00
M. B. Nowhattia	Independent	8	0.00
D. Sharma	Independent	7	0.00
M. Kumar	Independent	7	0.00
H. R. Singh	Independent	7	0.00
T. Ahuja	Independent	6	0.00
K. D. P. M. Lal	Independent	6	0.00
Dr. R. K. Chitkara	Independent	6	0.00
P. Kumar	Independent	5	0.00
P. K. Gupta	Independent	5	0.00
M. N. Gautam	Independent	3	0.00

The election was won by R. Khanna. The by-election victory was interpreted as an important victory for the Congress government of P.V. Narasimha Rao.

Khanna failed to be re-elected from New Delhi in 1996. Sinha was elected to the Rajya Sabha in 1996, and would later become a Union Minister. In his 2016 autobiography Anything but Khamoosh, Sinha expressed regret over having contested the 1992 by-election against fellow actor Khanna.
