= Mukul Banerjee =

Indian politician (1925 – c. 1991)

Member of Parliament, Lok Sabha
- In office 1971–1977
- Preceded by: Manohar Lal Sondhi
- Succeeded by: Atal Bihari Vajpayee
- Constituency: New Delhi

Personal details
- Born: Mukul Mukherjee; 7 December 1925 Varanasi, United Provinces, British India
- Died: c. 1991 (aged 65–66)
- Party: Indian National Congress
- Spouse: Bhawani Prasad Banerjee

Mukul Banerjee (née Mukherjee; 7 December 1925 – c. 1991) was an Indian politician. She was elected to the Lok Sabha, lower house of the Parliament of India from New Delhi as a member of the Indian National Congress. Banerjee death was announced in 1991.
