= My Frozen Turbulence in Kashmir =

Jagmohan's memoir

- Author: Jagmohan
- Language: English
- Genre: Memoir, history
- Publisher: Allied Publishers, New Delhi
- Publication date: September 1991 (1st edition) February 2017 (12th edition)
- Publication place: India
- ISBN: 9788170233329
- OCLC: 26763635

My Frozen Turbulence in Kashmir is a memoir by Jagmohan first published in September 1991. It focuses on his months as a governor of Jammu and Kashmir in 1990 during the peak of insurgency. Its scope is wide, ranging from the history of ancient Kashmir and modern Kashmir, to how the state saw a breakdown of government machinery during the end of 1980s. Notably, during Jagmohan's second tenure, the genocide of Kashmiri Hindus was exacerbated. The book is an attempt to address disinformation spread related to him and in general during those years.

In the first year of release the book saw four reprints. The 12th edition was released in 2017. It contains a section on initiatives taken during the premiership of Narendra Modi with respect of Kashmir. It has been translated into a number of regional Indian languages.

== Reception ==
Mulk Raj Anand and Arun Shourie provided positive feedback for the book. The book has received much criticism and negativity. It has been called as an attempt to justify his actions during his months as governor. A lack of literary style and the presentation of facts for contentious issues have been criticized.
