= Manibhai Chaudhary =

Indian politician

Member of Parliament, Lok Sabha
- In office 1996-2004
- Preceded by: Uttambhai Patel
- Succeeded by: Kishanbhai Vestabhai Patel
- Constituency: Bulsar, Gujarat

Personal details
- Born: 1 October 1947 (age 78) Barolia, Valsad district, Gujarat
- Party: Bharatiya Janata Party
- As of 14 August, 2012

Manibhai Ramjibhai Chaudhary (born 1 October 1947) is an Indian politician belonging to the Bharatiya Janata Party. He was a member of the Lok Sabha, the lower house of the Indian Parliament from Bulsar constituency in Gujarat in 1996, 1998 and 1999. He was earlier a member of the Gujarat Legislative assembly from Dharampur.
