= Vikram Buddhi =

Indian criminal

- Born: 1971 (age 54–55); India
- Occupations: Student and teaching assistant
- Parent(s): Captain Buddhi K Subbarao and Syamala Buddhi
- Status: Released
- Criminal charges: threatening the life of George W. Bush and Bush's family
- Penalty: sentenced to 57 months of prison

Vikram S. Buddhi (born May 10, 1971) is an Indian Ph.D. student and teaching assistant at Purdue University who was convicted in 2007 for making death threats online against United States president George W. Bush, and Vice President Dick Cheney. He was imprisoned for 4 years and 9 months, and deported to India upon his release.

== Biography ==
Buddhi was born to Syamala Buddhi and Captain Buddhi K Subbarao in 1971. His father was a senior defence scientist with the Indian navy who had been tried for leaking naval secrets in 1988. He was acquitted in 1993 after the alleged leaked secrets were revealed to be his own Ph.D. thesis, a publicly available document.

== Trial ==
Buddhi posted messages on a Yahoo business discussion forum in December 2005 and January 2006, calling upon the people of Iraq to retaliate against the Iraq war and kill President George W. Bush, Vice President Dick Cheney and their spouses. Buddhi's lawyer Somnath Bharti alleged that the indictment did not mention any of the alleged charges and the prosecution failed to establish Buddhi as the author of the messages. Buddhi had hacked the Yahoo accounts of thousands of Purdue University Students, then used those hacked stolen IDs to spread anti-Bush and anti-war messages across Yahoo's Discussion Boards, using a bot.

Buddhi was sentenced in 2007 to 4 years, 9 months in prison.

== Reaction ==
Buddhi received support from the alumni and staff of several IITs, who joined with his father and lobbied for his release. He also received support from External Affairs Minister, SM Krishna and former U.S. president Bill Clinton.

== See also ==
- Freedom of speech in the United States
