= Nanubhai Patel =

Indian politician (born 1905)

Member of Parliament, Lok Sabha
- In office 1957-1980
- Succeeded by: Uttambhai Patel
- Constituency: Bulsar, Gujarat

Personal details
- Born: 17 November 1905 Veghaldhara, Bulsar, Bombay Presidency, British India
- Died: 17 October 1980 (aged 74) Surat, Gujarat, India
- Party: Indian National Congress
- Other political affiliations: Janata Party

Nanubhai Nichhabhai Patel (17 November 1905 – 17 October 1980) was an Indian politician. He was member of the Lok Sabha the lower house of Indian Parliament from Bulsar, Gujarat in 1957,1962,1967 and 1971 as a member of the Indian National Congress and in 1977 as a Janata Party candidate.
