= Malviya Nagar, Delhi Assembly constituency =

Constituency of the Delhi legislative assembly in India

Coordinates: 28.533°N 77.210°E

Malviya Nagar
- Constituency No. 43 for the Delhi Legislative Assembly

Constituency details
- Country: India
- Region: North India
- State: Delhi
- District: South Delhi
- Lok Sabha constituency: New Delhi
- Reservation: None

Member of Legislative Assembly
- 8th Delhi Legislative Assembly
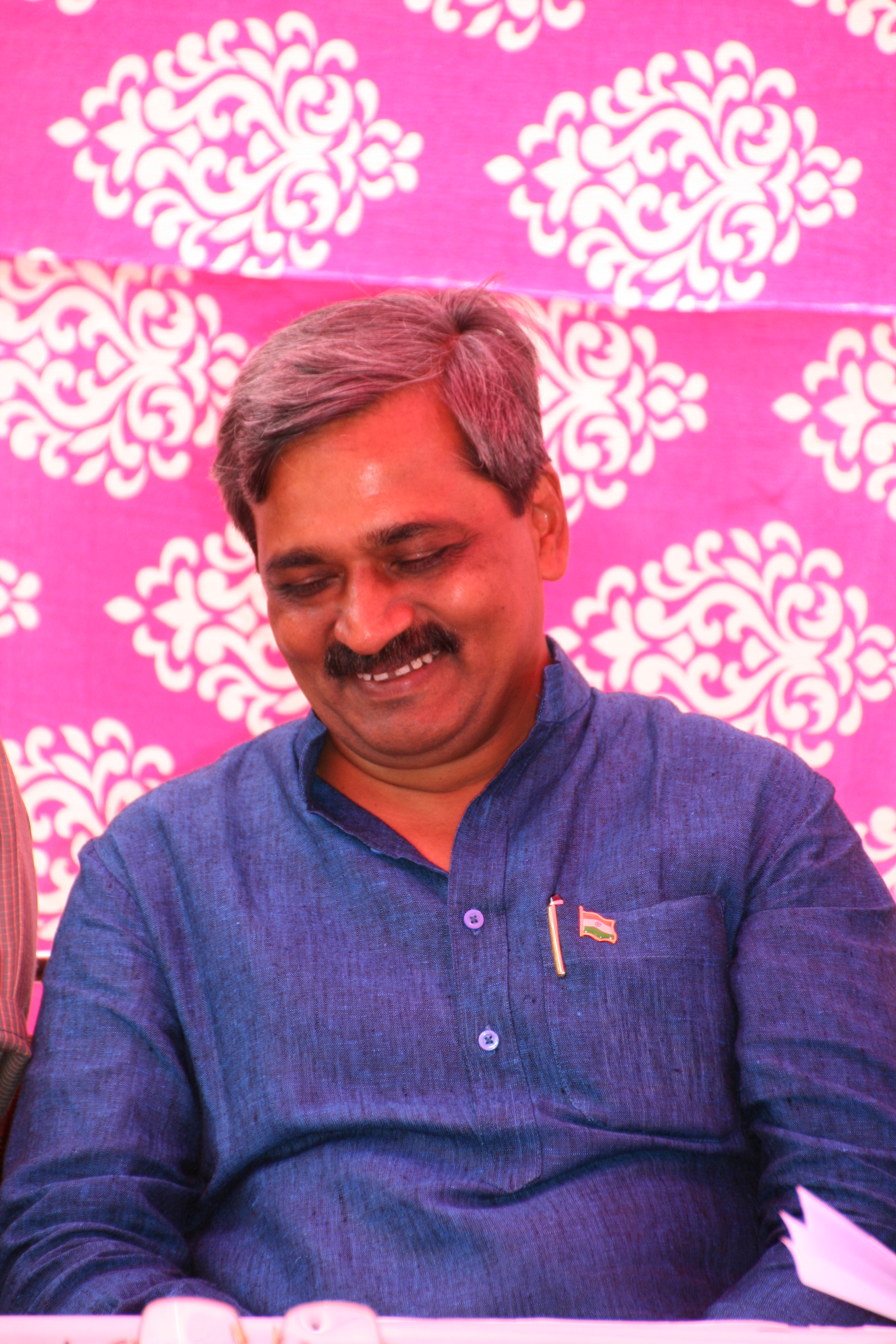
- Incumbent Satish Upadhyay
- Party: Bharatiya Janata Party
- Elected year: 2025

Malviya Nagar Assembly constituency is one of the seventy legislative assembly constituencies of Delhi in northern India. It includes the Malviya Nagar area in South Delhi. Malviya Nagar assembly constituency is a part of New Delhi (Lok Sabha) constituency.

== Extent of the constituency ==
The assembly constituency comes under Municipal Corporation of Delhi. It comprises the following wards :

Ward no	Ward name
148	Malviya Nagar
149	Hauz Khas
150	Green Park

== Members of the Legislative Assembly ==
Year	Member	Party
1993	Rajendra Gupta	Bharatiya Janata Party
1998	Yoganand Shastri	Indian National Congress
2003	Yoganand Shastri	Indian National Congress
2008	Kiran Walia	Indian National Congress
2013	Somnath Bharti	Aam Aadmi Party
2015	Somnath Bharti	Aam Aadmi Party
2020	Somnath Bharti	Aam Aadmi Party
2025	Satish Upadhyay	Bharatiya Janata Party

== Election results ==
=== 2025 ===
Delhi Assembly elections, 2025: Malviya Nagar
Party	Candidate	Votes	%	±%
BJP	Satish Upadhyay	39,564	46.53	▲8.77
AAP	Somnath Bharti	37,433	44.02	▼13.95
INC	Jitendra Kumar Kochar	6,770	7.96	▲4.78
Independent	Meghnad S.	192	0.23	New
NOTA	None of the above	532	0.63	▲0.02
Majority		2,131	2.61	▼17.60
Turnout		85,035		
BJP gain from AAP		Swing		

=== 2020 ===
Delhi Assembly elections, 2020: Malviya Nagar
Party	Candidate	Votes	%	±%
AAP	Somnath Bharti	52,043	57.97	+2.99
BJP	Shailender Singh	33,899	37.76	−0.15
INC	Neetu Verma Soin	2,856	3.18	−2.78
NOTA	None of the above	549	0.61	+0.15
Majority		18,144	20.21	+3.14
Turnout		89,825	58.92	−7.63
AAP hold		Swing	+2.99	

=== 2015 ===
Delhi Assembly elections, 2015: Malviya Nagar
Party	Candidate	Votes	%	±%
AAP	Somnath Bharti	51,196	54.98	+15.55
BJP	Dr. Nandini Sharma	35,299	37.91	+7.98
INC	Dr. Yoganand Shastri	5,555	5.96	−19.10
BSP	Dr. Suman Dharmvir	293	0.31	−0.60
Navyug Party	Markandey Sharma	184	0.20	
Independent	Somnath	129	0.14	
Independent	Ramakant Sharma	74	0.08	
Majority		15,897	17.07	+7.57
Turnout		93,156	66.55	
Registered electors		1,39,987		
AAP hold		Swing	+15.55	

=== 2013 ===
Delhi Assembly elections, 2013: Malviya Nagar
Party	Candidate	Votes	%	±%
AAP	Somnath Bharti	32,258	39.43	
BJP	Arti Mehra	24,486	29.93	−11.07
INC	Kiran Walia	20,500	25.06	−21.49
ACP	Kishor	2,389	2.92	
BSP	Vijender	741	0.91	−9.26
SP	Chahat Miyan	247	0.30	
DMDK	Sharmila	184	0.22	
Independent	Rajeev Kumar	134	0.16	
PECP	Rafik	129	0.16	
BBP	Mohd Yusuf	93	0.11	
NCP	Sunil Atree	88	0.11	
NDP	Hannan Ahmed	47	0.06	
Independent	Bharat Kumar Shahoo	45	0.06	
ASP	Kiran	36	0.04	
JKNPP	Prem Singh	32	0.04	
LJP	Javed Farooqui	30	0.04	−0.48
NOTA	None	375	0.46	
Majority		7,772	9.50	+3.95
Turnout		81,895	65.74	
AAP gain from INC		Swing		

=== 2008 ===
Delhi Assembly elections, 2008: Malviya Nagar
Party	Candidate	Votes	%	±%
INC	Kiran Walia	31,283	46.55	−1.55
BJP	Ram Bhaj	27,551	41.00	+1.44
BSP	Shri Pal Saini	6,832	10.17	+5.25
LJP	Javed Farooqui	352	0.52	
Independent	Rafik	309	0.46	
Independent	Rajiv Malhotra	244	0.36	
Independent	Ajit John	231	0.34	
NJD	Hanif Mohammad Khan	218	0.32	
JKNPP	Rajeev Khosla	106	0.16	−0.12
NSCP	Tulsi Prasad Yadav	75	0.11	
Majority		3,730	5.55	−2.99
Turnout		67,201	55.9	+8.25
INC hold		Swing	-1.55	

=== 2003 ===
Delhi Assembly elections, 2003: Malviya Nagar
Party	Candidate	Votes	%	±%
INC	Dr Yoganand Shastri	25,448	48.10	−7.09
BJP	Monika Arora	20,928	39.56	−1.41
NCP	Sukhbir Singh Panwar	3,256	6.15	
BSP	Iqbal Khan	2,601	4.92	+2.41
SP	Chetan Kumar	221	0.42	−0.02
Independent	Sunil Sodhi	209	0.40	
JKNPP	Sanjoy Sachdev	149	0.28	
RJP	Virender Singh	91	0.17	
Majority		4,520	8.54	−5.68
Turnout		52,903	47.65	+3.04
INC hold		Swing	-7.09	

=== 1998 ===
Delhi Assembly elections, 1998: Malviya Nagar
Party	Candidate	Votes	%	±%
INC	Dr Yoganand Shastri	30,910	55.19	+12.78
BJP	Rajendra Gupta	22,946	40.97	−2.02
BSP	Pitambar Singh	1,406	2.51	
JD	Mohd Feroz Khan	308	0.55	−9.53
SP	Mohd Umar	247	0.44	
SHS	Shailender Choudhary	72	0.13	
AWP	Wahid Hussain	70	0.12	
Independent	Satish Kuamr	45	0.08	
Majority		7,964	14.22	+13.64
Turnout		56,004	44.61	−10.38
INC gain from BJP		Swing	+12.78	

=== 1993 ===
Delhi Assembly elections, 1993: Malviya Nagar
Party	Candidate	Votes	%	±%
BJP	Rajendra Gupta	19,319	42.99	
INC	Yoga Nand Shastri	19,061	42.41	
JD	Ranjit Shastri	4,531	10.08	
Independent	Kailash Chand Panwar	1,114	2.48	
BJVP	Daler Singh	341	0.76	
DBP	Modh Feroj Khan	209	0.47	
SS	Ranjeet Kapoor	111	0.25	
Independent	R K Gupta	107	0.24	
Independent	Ravi Kumar	63	0.14	
Independent	Deepak	52	0.12	
SAD(M)	Birender Singh	32	0.07	
Majority		258	0.58	
Turnout		44,940	54.99	
BJP hold		Swing		
