= Dhavalbhai Patel =

Member of the Lok Sabha

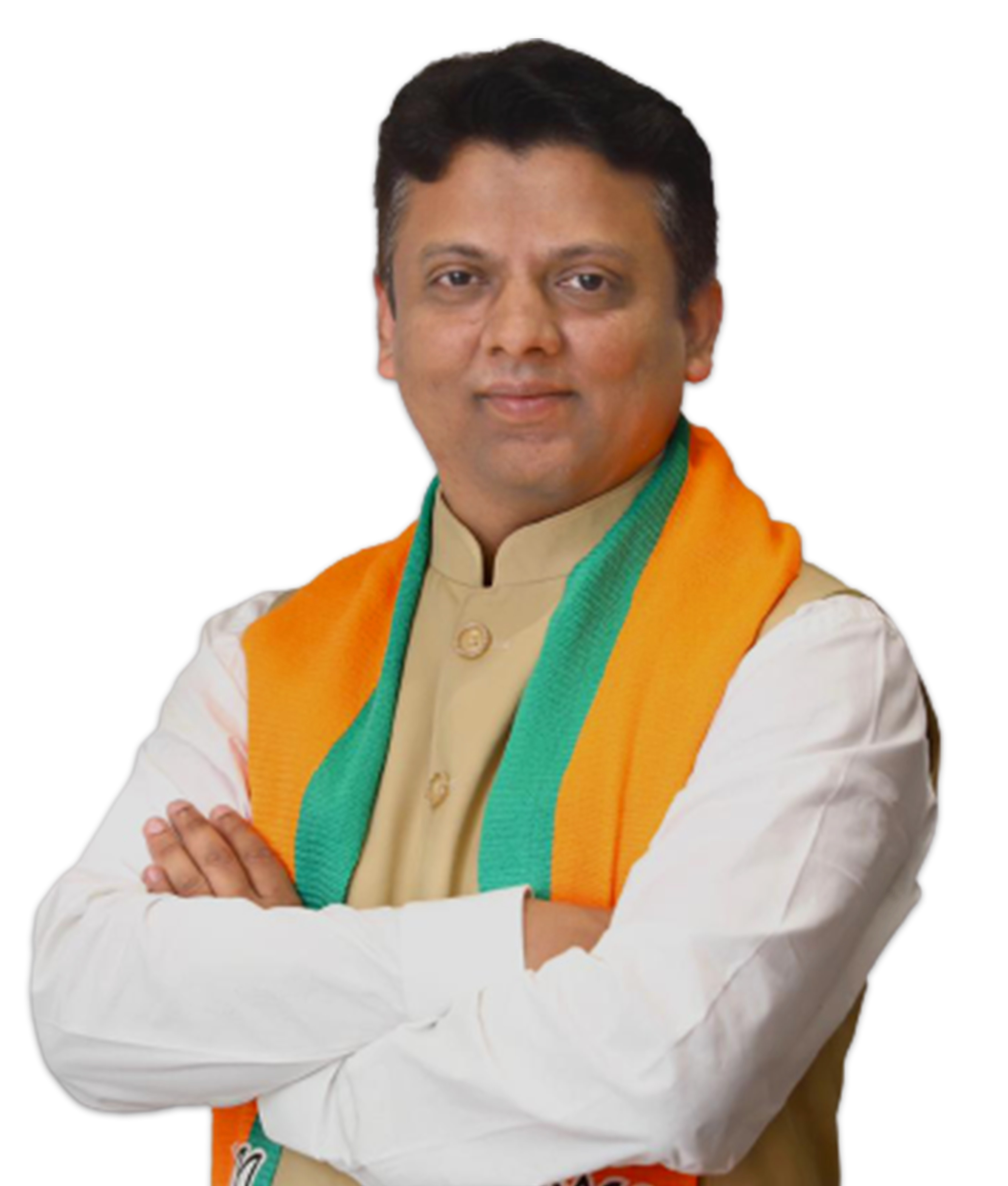

Member of Parliament, Lok Sabha
- Incumbent
- Assumed office 4 June 2024
- Preceded by: K C Patel
- Constituency: Valsad

Personal details
- Born: 28 April 1986 (age 40)
- Party: Bharatiya Janata Party
- Occupation: Politician, Business Person

Dhaval Laxmanbhai Patel is an Indian politician originally from Jhari Village of Vansda, Navsari Gujarat. He was elected as a Member of Parliament from Valsad Lok Sabha constituency. He currently serves as a Lok Sabha Whip and holds significant roles within the BJP's organizational structure, particularly focusing on tribal outreach and digital strategy.

Early Life and Education

Patel hails from Jhari Village of Vansda, Navsari, Gujarat. He earned a Bachelor of Technology in Computer Engineering from NIT Surat in 2008 and an MBA in Marketing from Symbiosis University in 2010. Before entering politics, he accumulated over a decade of experience in senior management roles at multinational corporations such as IBM, Accenture Strategy, and Capgemini, working across various regions including the USA, UK, Europe, the Middle East, and Southeast Asia.

Political Career

Parliamentary Role

In the 2024 Indian general elections, Patel was elected to the 18th Lok Sabha, representing the Valsad Lok Sabha constituency. He secured a decisive victory with 764,226 votes, defeating his nearest rival by a margin of 210,704 votes. As a Member of Parliament, he has been active in parliamentary debates and has raised numerous questions pertaining to rail projects, healthcare, housing, and women's empowerment.

Political Positions

1. Lok Sabha Whip Dhaval Patel serves as a Whip in the 18th Lok Sabha, representing the Valsad constituency.

2. National Social Media In-Charge, BJP Scheduled Tribe (ST) Morcha He holds the position of National Social Media In-Charge for the BJP's ST Morcha.

Publications

He has authored a book ‘Bharat ke Janjatiya Krantiveer; Swatantrata Sangram ki 75 Ansuni Kahaniya’.

He belongs to Bharatiya Janata Party.
