= Arjunbhai Patel =

Indian politician (born 1928)

Member of Parliament, Lok Sabha
- In office 1989–1991
- Preceded by: Uttambhai Patel
- Succeeded by: Uttambhai Patel
- Constituency: Bulsar, Gujarat

Personal details
- Born: 10 February 1928
- Party: Janata Dal

Arjunbhai Patel (born 10 February 1928) is an Indian politician. He was member of the Lok Sabha the lower house of Indian Parliament from Bulsar in Gujarat as a member of the Janata Dal in 1989.
