= Prem Khandu Thungan =

1st Chief Minister of Arunachal Pradesh

Prem Khandu Thungon
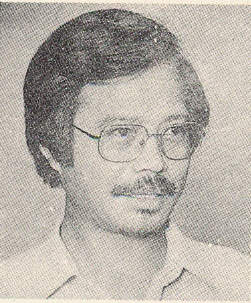

Chief Minister of Arunachal Pradesh
- In office 13 August 1975 – 18 September 1979
- Lieutenant Governor: K. A. A. Raja; R. N. Haldipur
- Preceded by: Position established
- Succeeded by: Tomo Riba
Union ministerial offices
Union Minister of State for Urban Affairs and Employment
In office 18 January 1993 – 13 September 1995
Prime Minister	P. V. Narasimha Rao
Minister	Sheila Kaul
Preceded by	M. Arunachalam
Succeeded by	S. S. Ahluwalia
Union Minister of State for Water Resources
In office 19 January 1993 – 10 February 1995
Prime Minister	P. V. Narasimha Rao
Minister	Vidya Charan Shukla
Succeeded by	P. V. Rangayya Naidu
Union Minister of State for Heavy Industries and Public Enterprises
In office 2 July 1992 – 18 January 1993
Prime Minister	P. V. Narasimha Rao
Minister	P. V. Narasimha Rao
Union Minister of State for Commerce and Industry
In office 21 June 1991 – 2 July 1992
Prime Minister	P. V. Narasimha Rao
Minister	P. V. Narasimha Rao
Succeeded by	P. J. Kurien

Personal details
- Born: 5 June 1946 (age 79) Shergaon, West Kameng district, North-East Frontier Agency
- Party: Indian National Congress (1979-present); Janata Party (until 1979)
- Spouse: Phurpa Lamu Thungon
- Children: 2

Prem Khandu Thungon (born 5 June 1946) is an Indian politician from Arunachal Pradesh. He was the first chief minister subsequent to the erstwhile North-East Frontier Agency becoming a union territory in 1972, and the first assembly elections held in 1978. As of 2023, he remains the youngest chief minister of the state. He also served as Deputy Minister for Supply and Rehabilitation (1980-1982) and Deputy Minister in the Ministry of Education, Culture and Social Welfare (1982-1984) in Third Indira Gandhi ministry.Then he served as Minister of State in the Ministry of Commerce and Industry (1991-1992), Ministry of Industry- Department of Heavy Industry and Public Enterprises (1992-1993), Ministry of Urban Affairs and Employment (1993-1995) in P. V. Narasimha Rao ministry.

== Political career ==
North-East Frontier Agency (NEFA) conducted its first elections for the state legislature in 1977. Thungon became the youngest chief minister of Arunachal Pradesh at the age of 29.

In the first parliamentary election in the state, the 1977 Indian general election, Thungon was elected uncontested from the Arunachal West Lok Sabha constituency on an Indian National Congress party ticket. In the 1980 Indian general election, Thungon won the seat amongst four other candidates with 41,736 votes of the total 98,260 valid votes cast.

=== Corruption cases ===
In 1998, the Central Bureau of Investigation (CBI) registered a case followed by chargesheeting ten people 5 years later. This included Thungon, who was then a Minister of State in the Ministry of Urban Affairs and Employment in the P. V. Narsimha Rao ministry, and Maheshwari who opened a bank account in the name of a non-existent person to divert money. In July 2015, special CBI judge Ajay Kumar Jain found Thungon and three others guilty of criminal conspiracy, cheating, and forgery under sections of the Indian Penal Code and Prevention of Corruption Act. Subsequently, the court sentenced Thungon to 4.5 years in jail and a fine of INR 10,000. The court observed that all financial records in the case were fudged but nobody complained. The judgement further added, "The saddest part is that its knowledge was apparent both at the Centre and the state level, but no action was taken... On the other hand, the entire government machinery worked to shield the offences committed but he minister and bureaucrats. Fortunately, the offences surfaced during investigation in some other case." Thungon was 68 years old at the time of conviction.

CBI registered another graft case in 1996 against Thungon, Sheila Kaul, the then Urban Affairs and Employment Minister, Tulsi Balodi, Lakhpa Tsering, and Krishna. It concerned allotment of government shops and stalls between September 1993 and June 1994. The five accused were charged with dishonesty and fraud in the allotment in contravention of rules. Proceedings against Kaul and Balodi were abated as they died during the trial. In March 2016, Thungon was sentenced three and half years. In addition, special CBI judge Sanjeev Aggarwal imposed a fine of INR 100,000 on Thungon.

CBI lodged another case in 1996 against 18 people including Thungon in regard to alleged irregularities in allotment of government quarters. The chargesheet in the case was filed only in 2003 with offences for forgery, criminal conspiracy and corruption framed in 2009. In 2017, special CBI judge Kamini Lau acquitted 15 people, including Thungon on the grounds of insufficient evidence almost 21 years later. The other three died during the course of the trial.
