= K C Patel =

Indian politician

DR.K.C. Patel

Member of the India Parliament for Valsad
- In office 16 May 2014 – 2024
- Preceded by: Kishanbhai Vestabhai Patel
- Succeeded by: Dhavalbhai Patel

Personal details
- Born: 10 January 1949 (age 77) Kherlav, Valsad, Gujarat
- Party: Bharatiya Janata Party
- Spouse: Smt. Ramaniben
- Children: 2
- Education: Government Medical College, Surat
- Occupation: Medical Practitioner
- As of 15 December, 2016

K C Patel (b 1949) is a member of the Bharatiya Janata Party in India, and has been elected from the Valsad (Lok Sabha constituency), in Gujarat, in the 2014 Indian general elections and 2019 Indian general elections. However later it was found out that it was case Honey trapping and woman arrested for the same.

== Controversy ==
A women has accused him in alleged rape incident and filed an FIR against him. She also said about him that MP has threatened her of dire consequences and asked her to keep her mouth shut or else she would be killed.

However later it was found out that it was case Honey trapping and woman arrested for the same.
