= Kishanbhai Vestabhai Patel =

Indian politician

Member of parliament, Lok Sabha
- Preceded by: Manibhai Chaudhary
- Succeeded by: K C Patel
- Constituency: Valsad

Personal details
- Born: 2 June 1964 (age 61) Bulsar, Gujarat
- Party: Indian National Congress
- Spouse: Smt. Gitaben Kishanbhai
- Children: 1 son and 2 daughters
- As of 25 February, 2006

Kishanbhai Vestabhai Patel (born 2 June 1964) was a member during 14th & 15th Lok Sabha of India. He represented the Valsad constituency from Gujarat state and is a member of the Indian National Congress.
