= Valsad Lok Sabha constituency =

Lok Sabha Constituency in Gujarat

Coordinates: 20.6°N 72.9°E

Valsad
- Lok Sabha constituency

Constituency details
- Country: India
- Region: Western India
- State: Gujarat
- Assembly constituencies: Dangs; Vansada; Dharampur; Valsad; Pardi; Kaprada; Umbergaon
- Established: 1957
- Reservation: ST

Member of Parliament
- 18th Lok Sabha
- Incumbent Dhaval Laxmanbhai Patel
- Party: Bharatiya Janata Party
- Elected year: 2024

Valsad (formerly Bulsar) is one of the 26 Lok Sabha (parliamentary) constituencies in Gujarat state in western India. This seat is considered a bellwether seat in India. It is believed that the party which wins this seat will form the central government.

== Assembly segments ==
Presently, Valsad Lok Sabha constituency comprises seven Vidhan Sabha (legislative assembly) segments. These are:

Constituency number	Name	Reserved for (SC/ST/None)	District	Party	2024 Lead
173	Dangs	ST	Dang	BJP	BJP
177	Vansada	ST	Navsari	INC	INC
178	Dharampur	ST	Valsad	BJP	INC
179	Valsad	None	Valsad	BJP	BJP
180	Pardi	None	Valsad	BJP	BJP
181	Kaprada	ST	Valsad	BJP	INC
182	Umbergaon	ST	Valsad	BJP	BJP

== Members of Parliament ==
Year	Winner	Party
1957	Nanubhai Patel	Indian National Congress
1962	Nanubhai Patel	Indian National Congress
1967	Nanubhai Patel	Indian National Congress
1971	Nanubhai Patel	Indian National Congress
1977	Nanubhai Patel	Janata Party
1980	Uttambhai Patel	Indian National Congress
1984	Uttambhai Patel	Indian National Congress
1989	Arjunbhai Patel	Janata Dal
1991	Uttambhai Patel	Indian National Congress
1996	Manibhai Chaudhary	Bharatiya Janata Party
1998	Manibhai Chaudhary	Bharatiya Janata Party
1999	Manibhai Chaudhary	Bharatiya Janata Party
2004	Kishanbhai Vestabhai Patel	Indian National Congress
2009	Kishanbhai Vestabhai Patel	Indian National Congress
2014	K C Patel	Bharatiya Janata Party
2019	K C Patel	Bharatiya Janata Party
2024	Dhaval Patel	Bharatiya Janata Party

== Election results ==
Vote share of Winning candidates
2024	56.13%
2019	61.25%
2014	55.05%
2009	46.20%
2004	46.63%
1999	51.57%
1998	47.20%
1996	47.29%
1991	56.92%
1989	50.93%
1984	55.67%
1980	51.71%
1977	51.11%
1971	59.51%
1967	67.42%
1962	50.62%
1957	58.01%

=== 2024 ===
2024 Indian general elections: Valsad
Party	Candidate	Votes	%	±%
BJP	Dhaval Laxmanbhai Patel	764,226	56.13	▼5.12
INC	Anant Patel	5,53,522	40.66	▲7.48
NOTA	None of the Above	18,373	1.35	▼0.18
BSP	Manakbhai Jatrubhai Shankar	7,499	0.55	▼0.67
Independent	Ramanbhai Karshanbhai Patel	6,745	0.50	N/A
Independent	Chiragkumar Bharatbhai Patel	3,440	0.25	N/A
Majority		2,10,704	15.48	▼12.59
Turnout		13,63,008	73.27	▼2.21
BJP hold		Swing		

=== 2019 ===
2019 Indian general elections: Valsad
Party	Candidate	Votes	%	±%
BJP	Dr. K. C. Patel	771,980	61.25	
INC	Jitubhai Chaudhari	4,18,183	33.18	
BSP	Kishorbhai Patel	15,359	1.22	
BTP	Pankajbhai Patel	9,536	0.76	
NOTA	None of the Above	19,307	1.53	
Majority		3,53,797	28.07	
Turnout		12,61,364	75.48	
BJP hold		Swing		

=== 2014 ===
2014 Indian general elections: Valsad
Party	Candidate	Votes	%	±%
BJP	Dr. K. C. Patel	617,772	55.05	
INC	Kishanbhai Vestabhai Patel	4,09,768	36.51	
NOTA	None of the Above	26,606	2.37	
Majority		2,08,004	18.54	
Turnout		11,23,182	74.28	
BJP gain from INC		Swing		

=== 2009 ===
2009 Indian general election: Valsad
Party	Candidate	Votes	%	±%
INC	Kishanbhai Vestabhai Patel	357,755	46.20	
BJP	Dhirubhai Chhaganbhai Patel	3,50,586	45.27	
Independent	Patel Rambhai Koyabhai	27,429	3.54	
BSP	Gavli Chhaganbhai Pilubhai	15,268	1.97	
ADSP	Pankajkumar Parabhubhai Patel	9,936	1.28	
CPI(ML)L	Varali Laxmanbhai Chhaganbhai	6,728	0.87	
SP	Bhoye Nayneshbhai Madhubhai	6,727	0.87	
Majority		7,169	0.93	
Turnout				
INC hold		Swing		

=== 2004 ===
2004 Indian general election: Bulsar (ST)
Party	Candidate	Votes	%	±%
INC	Kishanbhai Vestabhai Patel	321,769	46.63	▼0.34
BJP	Chaudhari Manibhai Ramjibhai	277,283	40.19	▼11.38
BNP	Delkar Nareshbhai Sanjibhai	58,184	8.43	New entry
SP	Patel Daksheshbhai Hirabhai	22,103	3.20	New entry
BSP	Patel Shankarbhai Chhaganbhai	10,643	1.54	▲0.25
Majority		44,486	6.45	▲1.85
Turnout				
INC gain from BJP		Swing		

=== 1999 ===
1999 Indian general election: Bulsar (ST)
Party	Candidate	Votes	%	±%
BJP	Manibhai Ramjibhai Chaudhari	300,195	51.57	▲4.37
INC	Uttambhai Harjibhai Patel	273,409	46.97	▲2.58
JD(S)	Patel Champakbhai Maganbhai	5,517	0.95	New entry
JD(U)	Gavit Dhanrajsinh Ratansingh	2,985	0.51	New entry
Majority		26,786	4.60	▲1.79
Turnout		596,510	51.82	▼4.70
BJP hold		Swing		

=== 1998 ===
1998 Indian general election: Bulsar (ST)
Party	Candidate	Votes	%	±%
BJP	Chaudhari Manibhai Ramjibhai	290,312	47.20	▼0.09
INC	Uttambhai Harjibhai Patel	273,036	44.39	▼2.82
AIRJP	Patel Ramanlal Nagarji	23,610	3.84	New entry
Independent	Patel Ashokbhai Ramanbhai	14,969	2.43	Steady
JD	Arunkumar Nanubhai Patel	13,112	2.13	▲1.19
Majority		17,276	2.81	▲2.73
Turnout		640,529	56.52	▲18.52
BJP hold		Swing		

=== 1996 ===
1996 Indian general election: Bulsar (ST)
Party	Candidate	Votes	%	±%
BJP	Manibhai Ramjibhai Chaudhari	198,531	47.29	▲9.94
INC	Uttambhai Harjibhai Patel	198,163	47.21	▼9.71
Independent	Thorat Somabhai Dhakalbhai	5,725	1.36	Steady
BSP	Patel Ambelal Laxmanbhai	5,424	1.29	▲0.72
Independent	Patel Ashokbhai Ramanbhai	3,971	0.95	Steady
JD	Arunaben Ghambhirbhai Patel	3,941	0.94	▼2.97
Independent	Chhotubhai J. Patel	1,676	0.40	Steady
AIIC(T)	Patel Naginbhai Devabhai	1,608	0.38	New entry
Independent	Patel Jaysinhbhai Babarbhai	737	0.18	Steady
Majority		368	0.08	▼19.49
Turnout		429,819	38.00	▲2.77
BJP gain from INC		Swing		

=== 1991 ===
1991 Indian general election: Bulsar (ST)
Party	Candidate	Votes	%	±%
INC	Uttambhai Harjibhai Patel	190,868	56.92	▲11.03
BJP	Khalpabhai Chhaganbhai Patel	125,260	37.35	New entry
JD	Gambhirbhai Bahecharbhai Patel	13,114	3.91	▼47.02
BSP	Thakaria Ratilal Vajirbhai	1,898	0.57	▼1.02
YVP	Savitaben Gamanbhai Patel	1,658	0.49	New entry
Independent	Patel Virsinghbhai Vishrambhai	1,392	0.42	Steady
DDP	Chaudhari Satlia Ramjibhai	1,161	0.35	New entry
Majority		65,608	19.57	▲14.53
Turnout		343,529	35.23	▼11.89
INC gain from JD		Swing		

=== 1989 ===
1989 Indian general election: Bulsar (ST)
Party	Candidate	Votes	%	±%
JD	Ajunbhai Lallubhai Patel	223,146	50.93	New entry
INC	Patel Uttambhai Harjibhai	201,061	45.89	▼9.78
BSP	Garasia Ambubhai Laxamanbhai	6,967	1.59	New entry
DMM	Chaudhari Jethabhai Keshavbhai	6,946	1.59	New entry
Majority		22,085	5.04	▼8.78
Turnout		451,740	47.12	▼8.58
JD gain from INC		Swing		

=== 1984 ===
1984 Indian general election: Bulsar (ST)
Party	Candidate	Votes	%	±%
INC	Patel Uttambhai Harjibhai	220,217	55.67	▲3.96
BJP	Patel Kanjibhai Maganbhai	165,527	41.85	New entry
Independent	Billimoria Naginbhai Kikubhai	5,301	1.34	Steady
DDP	Mansinghbhai Fooljibhai Chaudhari	4,510	1.14	New entry
Majority		54,690	13.82	▲6.34
Turnout		411,727	55.70	▼0.10
INC hold		Swing		

=== 1980 ===
1980 Indian general election: Bulsar (ST)
Party	Candidate	Votes	%	±%
INC(I)	Patel Uttambhai Harjibhai	179,241	51.71	New entry
JP	Jadav Ramubhai Balubhai	153,294	44.23	▼6.88
INC(U)	Patel Savitaben Gamanbhai	14,068	4.06	New entry
Majority		25,947	7.48	▲1.80
Turnout		360,114	55.80	▼3.51
INC(I) gain from JP		Swing		

=== 1977 ===
1977 Indian general election: Bulsar (ST)
Party	Candidate	Votes	%	±%
JP	Patel Nanubhai Nichhabhai	161,861	51.11	New entry
INC	Patel Nirmalabhen Harjibhai	143,897	45.43	▲9.83
Independent	Gavit Ratanbhai Govindbhai	10,960	3.46	Steady
Majority		17,964	5.68	▼18.23
Turnout		330,000	59.31	▲7.72
JP gain from INC(O)		Swing		

=== 1971 ===
1971 Indian general election: Bulsar (ST)
Party	Candidate	Votes	%	±%
INC(O)	Nanubhai Nichhabhai Patel	144,694	59.51	New entry
INC	Gamanbhai Vajirbhai Patel	86,561	35.60	▼31.82
ABJS	Kanjibhai Maganbhai Patel	11,882	4.89	New entry
Majority		58,133	23.91	▼10.93
Turnout		255,444	51.59	▼10.47
INC(O) gain from INC		Swing		

=== 1967 ===
1967 Indian general election: Bulsar (ST)
Party	Candidate	Votes	%	±%
INC	N. N. Patel	185,241	67.42	▲16.80
SWA	G. B. Patel	89,535	32.58	New entry
Majority		95,706	34.84	▲33.60
Turnout		288,574	62.06	▼2.60
INC hold		Swing		

=== 1962 ===
1962 Indian general election: Bulsar (ST)
Party	Candidate	Votes	%	±%
INC	Nanubhai Nichhabhai Patel	149,689	50.62	▼7.39
PSP	Narottambhai Bhulabhai Patel	146,030	49.38	▲7.39
Majority		3,659	1.24	▼14.78
Turnout		304,863	64.66	▲1.24
INC hold		Swing		

=== 1957 ===
1957 Indian general election: Bulsar (ST)
Party	Candidate	Votes	%	±%
INC	Patel Nanubhai Nichhabhai	143,321	58.01	New entry
PSP	Patel Revlabhai Sukarbhai	103,748	41.99	New entry
Majority		39,573	16.02	New entry
Turnout		247,069	63.42	New entry
INC win (new seat)				

== See also ==
- Valsad district
- List of constituencies of the Lok Sabha
