= Somnath Bharti =

Indian politician and lawyer

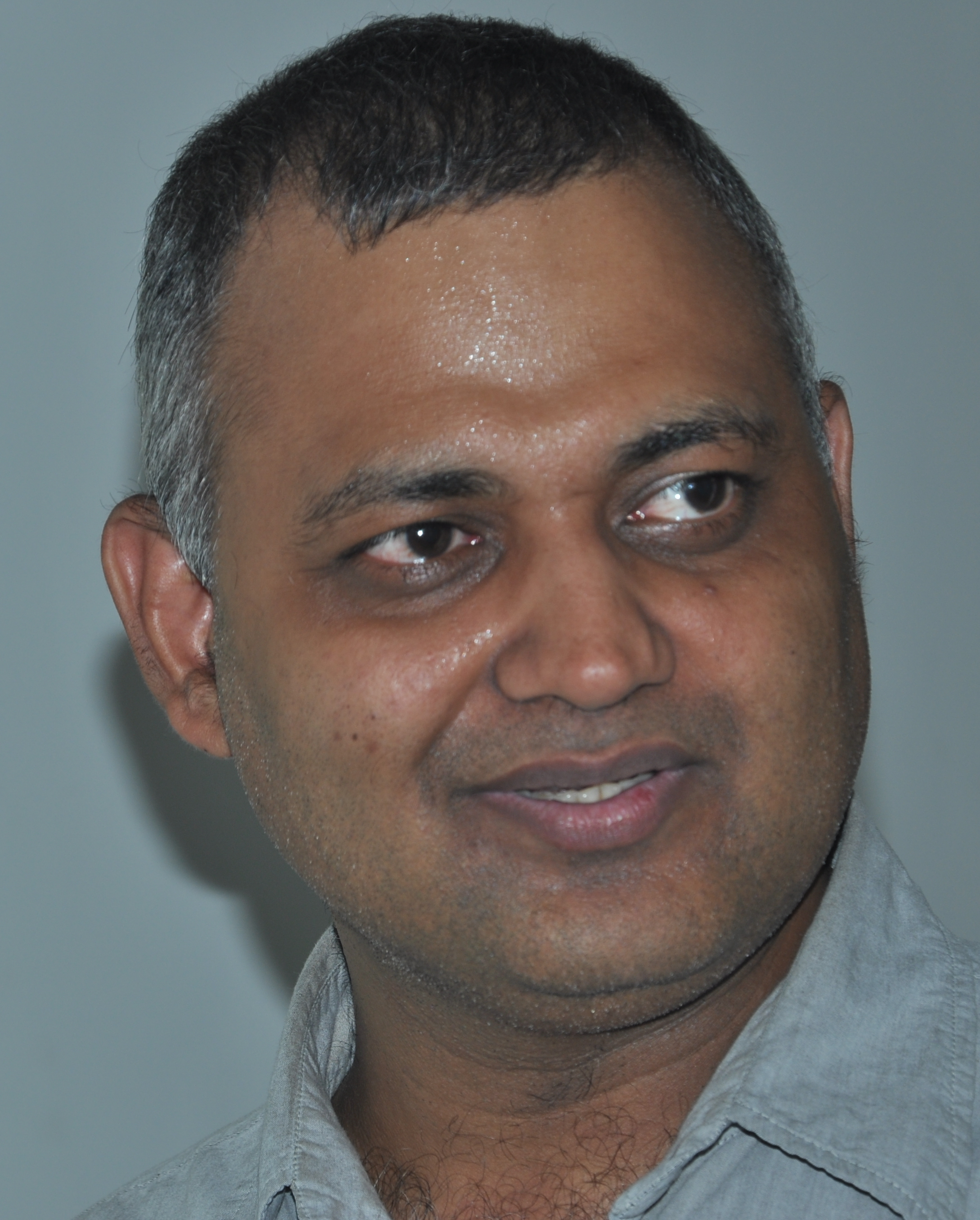

Member of the Delhi Legislative Assembly
- In office 8 December 2013 – 8 February 2025
- Preceded by: Kiran Walia
- Succeeded by: Satish Upadhyay
- Constituency: Malviya Nagar

Personal details
- Born: 10 May 1974 (age 52) Nawada, Bihar, India
- Party: Aam Aadmi Party
- Spouse: Lipika (m. 2010)
- Children: 2
- Education: M.Sc. Mathematics (IIT Delhi); LLB (University of Delhi)
- Occupation: Lawyer, activist and politician
- Website: http://www.somnathbharti.com

Somnath Bharti (born 10 May 1974) is an Indian politician and lawyer.

As a member of the Aam Aadmi Party, Bharti served as a Member of Legislative Assembly (MLA) of Delhi from Malviya Nagar constituency. He has previously served as minister of Law, Tourism, Administrative Reforms, Art & Culture in the Government of Delhi, from December 2013 to February 2014 in the first Arvind Kejriwal government.

He is a practicing lawyer in the Supreme Court of India and Delhi High Court. He had represented the Malviya Nagar constituency in the Delhi Legislative Assembly from 2013 till 2025.

== Early life ==
Bharti was born in Baranwal Bania family at Hisua Bazar in Nawada. He was educated firstly at a local school and went to Patna for intermediate education. After completing his post-graduate M.Sc. Mathematics from IIT Delhi, Bharti pursued a degree in law at Delhi University. He served IIT Delhi Alumni Association as its Secretary for 2007-08 and 2011–12, as a President of IIT DAA in 2012-13 and as IIT Delhi Senator in 2008.

== Career ==
=== Business ===
In the 2000s, Somnath Bharti ran a Delhi-based IT firm Madgen Solutions. The Spamhaus Project accused him of spamming on behalf of TopSites LLC, naming him in Register of Known Spam Operations (ROKSO) as one of the top spam operators in the world. According to Bharti, he was listed in ROKSO after an Open Directory Project editor Conrad Longmore ran a story on him. Responding to a PCQuest investigation in 2005, he insisted that all the e-mails sent by his company complied with the laws and regulations. PCQuest found that he had been sued in a California Superior Court for spamming by Daniel Balsam. Balsam's attorney Timothy Walton revealed that in 2004, Bharti and two others had paid Balsam in damages apart from making a court declaration agreeing to use only confirmed opt-in e-mail addresses when sending commercial e-mails. Bharti defended himself by saying that he chose to settle because defending the case in the United States would have been costlier for him. Bharti also claimed that he was in touch with SpamHaus, but the SpamHaus CEO Steve Linford denied this to PCQuest.

=== Legal ===
In 2009 Bharti represented Vikram Buddhi. He led a movement against the abeyance of sentencing of Buddhi in the USA.

In 2013, Delhi High Court quashed the FIR and released 8 accused falsely charges in the Constable Tomar's death during the Nirbhaya protests. Advocate He has sought the quashing of the FIR against the eight accused on the grounds that they have been falsely implicated by the Delhi Police for offences during the public protests that erupted after the Delhi gangrape. Advocate Somnath Bharti, appearing for the accused, told the court that according to the video footage of news channels and two witnesses, the accused were innocent.

=== Activism ===
In June 2012, Bharti was involved in a campaign against the alleged interference of the then Minister of Human Resources and Development, Kapil Sibal, in the Joint Entrance Examination process for admission to Indian Institutes of Technology. In 2010–2013, he appeared in news for defending the rights of homeschooled children and subscribers of alternate education system in view of the binding provision of the Right of Children to Free and Compulsory Education Act through Public Interest Litigations filed in Delhi High Court thrice. In response to his PILs, the Ministry of Human Resources and Development, through an affidavit, clarified that they are not against homeschooling.

=== Political career ===
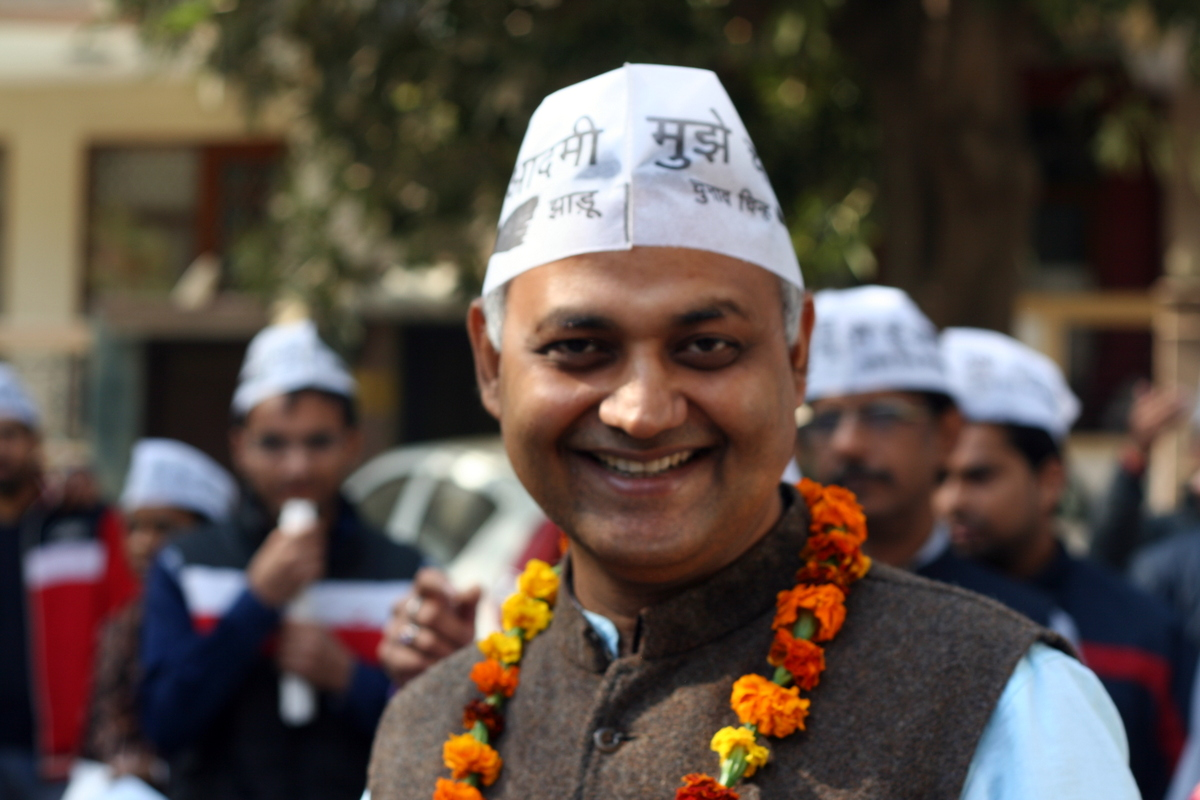
Somnath Bharti on Election Campaign

Bharti was the Aam Aadmi Party candidate for the Malviya Nagar constituency in the Delhi state assembly elections, 2013. Bharti won the seat, defeating Arti Mehra of the Bharatiya Janata Party and the incumbent Kiran Walia of the Indian National Congress. Walia had won the seat in 1999, 2003, and 2008 and had been education minister in the earlier government, while Mehra, who has represented the neighbouring Hauz Khas constituency for many years, had been Mayor of Delhi in 2007–2009. In contrast, Bharti was new to politics.

He served as Chairman, Committee on Privileges of Delhi Legislative Assembly for the year 2016–17. On 10 August 2018, Delhi Legislative Assembly appointed him as chairman, Committee to examine the Stray Dog and Monkey Menace in Delhi. He won the 2020 Delhi Elections by 18,144 votes. By Delhi Legislative Assembly he was appointed Chairman, Public Accounts Committee (one of the three most important Committees of a legislative assembly or Indian Parliament viz. Public Accounts Committee, Committee on Govt Undertakings and Committee on Estimates), Chairman, House Committee on Violation of Protocol Norms and Contemptuous Behaviour By Government Officers with MLAs, Members of Standing Committee on Education (Education; Higher Education; Training & Technical Education; Art, Culture and Language; Sports) and Committee on Govt Undertakings.

Bharti was briefly Minister of Law, Tourism, Administrative Reforms, Art & Culture in the Government of Delhi. He was appointed on 28 December 2013 and left office on 14 February 2014 when the government of which he was a part resigned due a failure to enact a Jan Lokpal bill.

The government's resignation, led by Arvind Kejriwal, pre-empted a personal resignation by Bharti in response to accusations of vigilantism. He was elected again by the people of Malviya Nagar constituency in Feb 2015 by double the margin than the last time when Delhi gave mandate of 67 out of 70 seats in Delhi assembly to AAP. He was sent to Delhi Development Authority as a member of the Board which controls Land and development of Delhi. His work can be gauged from the fact that his efforts and continuous efforts made DDA claim their unclaimed and open to encroachers over 65000 pieces of lands across Delhi.

He was appointed Vice Chairman of Delhi Jal Board in March 2023.

Bharti started a direct dialogue program using the term "mohalla groups" on WhatsApp after being elected as MLA from Malviya Nagar constituency.

In 2025 Delhi Legislative Assembly election, he lost from his seat Malviya Nagar by a margin of 2,131 votes to BJP candidate Satish Upadhyay

== Electoral performance ==
=== 2025 ===
Delhi Assembly elections, 2025: Malviya Nagar
Party	Candidate	Votes	%	±%
BJP	Satish Upadhyay	39,564	46.53	▲8.77
AAP	Somnath Bharti	37,433	44.02	▼13.95
INC	Jitendra Kumar Kochar	6,770	7.96	▲4.78
NOTA	None of the above	532	0.63	▲0.02
IND	Meghnad S.	192	0.23	New
Majority		2,131	2.61	▼17.60
Turnout		85,035		
BJP gain from AAP		Swing		

Delhi Assembly elections, 2020: Malviya Nagar
Party	Candidate	Votes	%	±%
AAP	Somnath Bharti	52,043	57.97	+2.99
BJP	Shailender Singh	33,899	37.76	−0.15
INC	Neetu Verma Soin	2,856	3.18	−2.78
NOTA	None of the above	549	0.61	+0.15
Majority		18,144	20.21	+3.14
Turnout		89,825	58.92	−7.63
AAP hold		Swing	+2.99	

Delhi Assembly elections, 2015: Malviya Nagar
Party	Candidate	Votes	%	±%
AAP	Somnath Bharti	51,196	54.98	+15.55
BJP	Dr. Nandini Sharma	35,299	37.91	+7.98
INC	Dr. Yoganand Shastri	5,555	5.96	−19.10
BSP	Dr. Suman Dharmvir	293	0.31	−0.60
Navyug Party	Markandey Sharma	184	0.20	
Independent	Somnath	129	0.14	
Independent	Ramakant Sharma	74	0.08	
Majority		15,897	17.07	+7.57
Turnout		93,156	66.55	
Registered electors		1,39,987		
AAP hold		Swing	+15.55	

Delhi Assembly elections, 2013: Malviya Nagar
Party	Candidate	Votes	%	±%
AAP	Somnath Bharti	32,258	39.43	
BJP	Arti Mehra	24,486	29.93	−11.07
INC	Kiran Walia	20,500	25.06	−21.49
ACP	Kishor	2,389	2.92	
BSP	Vijender	741	0.91	−9.26
SP	Chahat Miyan	247	0.30	
DMDK	Sharmila	184	0.22	
Independent	Rajeev Kumar	134	0.16	
PECP	Rafik	129	0.16	
BBP	Mohd Yusuf	93	0.11	
NCP	Sunil Atree	88	0.11	
NDP	Hannan Ahmed	47	0.06	
Independent	Bharat Kumar Shahoo	45	0.06	
ASP	Kiran	36	0.04	
JKNPP	Prem Singh	32	0.04	
LJP	Javed Farooqui	30	0.04	−0.48
NOTA	None	375	0.46	
Majority		7,772	9.50	+3.95
Turnout		81,895	65.74	
AAP gain from INC		Swing		

== Controversies ==
=== Evidence tampering ===
Patiala House Court had in 2013 indicted Bharti for "tampering with evidence" along with his client, Pawan Kumar, in a corruption case. He was asked by the Bar Council of Delhi to explain why he should not be debarred.

=== Khirki Extension raid ===
In January 2014, less than a month after being elected, Bharti mobilized his supporters and television camera crews to lead a vigilante raid in his constituency's Khirki Extension area. He had been tipped off about a drug and prostitution racket involving some African nationals operating in the area. He quarrelled with the Station House Officer, who refused to raid a house, citing a lack of a warrant. The group allegedly caught four women and forced them to undergo urine tests. The tests, conducted at AIIMS, did not find any drug traces in their system. The women alleged that they had been threatened and molested by the mob.

Protests were held against Bharti and AAP's attack on African Nationals. The BJP and CPM condemned Bharti's actions as racist and criticized the mob for violating the women. AAP supported Bharti, calling the women's allegations false and stating that his actions were not racist, adding that residents had long complained of criminal activities in the area. Kejriwal demanded the suspension of the police officers who had refused to conduct the raid. A court directed the police to lodge a First Information Report against the mob, and the Delhi Commission for Women also opened an investigation into the matter. Kejriwal's government came under increasing political pressure to act against Bharti in the hours before its resignation. An independent judicial inquiry ordered by the Lieutenant Governor of Delhi announced on 28 February 2014 that the police had been correct not to comply with Bharti's demands and that Bharti should not have taken the law into his own hands by leading the raid.

Around two years later, The Hindu reported that the raid led to an "exodus" of African nationals from the area, and emboldened the locals to abuse and taunt the remaining ones more freely.

=== Domestic violence case ===
In June 2015, Bharti's wife filed a complaint against him with the Delhi Commission for Women alleging domestic violence. On 10 September 2015, Bharti surrendered at the Dwarka Police Station late at night on 29 September 2015 under directions from the Supreme Court and obtained conditional bail. Bharti told a Delhi court that the couple had resolved the matrimonial dispute through mediation, however the court charged him with harassment, cheating and criminal intimidation. In May 2019, the FIR was quashed by Delhi High Court which noted that the couple are living happily together.

=== Unlawful assembly at AIIMS ===
In 2021, he was sentenced to two years in prison for leading a mob into AIIMS Delhi. Bharti claimed that there was no evidence and the case was based on a fabricated story. Subsequently, the Delhi High Court stayed the judgment and granted him bail.

State Legislative Assembly
Preceded by ?	Member of the Delhi Legislative Assembly from Malviya Nagar, Delhi Assembly constituency 2020– 2025	Succeeded by Umang Bajaj
