= Uttambhai Patel =

Indian politician

Member of Parliament, Lok Sabha
- In office 1980–1989
- Preceded by: Nanubhai Patel
- Succeeded by: Arjunbhai Patel
- In office 1991–1996
- Preceded by: Arjunbhai Patel
- Succeeded by: Manibhai Chaudhary
- Constituency: Valsad constituency, Gujarat

Personal details
- Born: 25 July 1927 Dumlav Village, Valsad district, Gujarat, British India
- Died: 30 January 2018 (aged 90) Dumlav Village,
- Party: Indian National Congress

Uttambhai Harjibhai Patel (25 July 1927 – 30 January 2018) was an Indian politician. He was a member of the Lok Sabha for the Valsad constituency in Gujarat as a candidate of the Indian National Congress. He was the Union Minister of State, Rural Development. He was earlier a member of the Gujarat Legislative Assembly.
