= Manohar Lal Sondhi =

Indian politician

Member of New Delhi Lok Sabha constituency, 4th Lok Sabha
- In office 1967–1971

Personal details
- Born: 1933
- Died: 2003 (aged 69–70)
- Party: Bharatiya Jana Sangh

Manohar Lal Sondhi (1933–2003) was an Indian politician and a member of Lok Sabha. He represented New Delhi constituency in 4th Lok Sabha from 1967 to 1971, elected as a candidate of Bharatiya Jan Sangh. He had his education from Punjab University (MA LLB), London School of Economics, Balliol College Oxford, and Charles University Prague (Czechoslovakia).

He and Balraj Madhok had had many differences over the years with Jana Sangh and BJP leadership, but Vajpayee's NDA government had appointed M L Sondhi as chairman of the Indian Council for Social Science Research.
