= P. V. Rangayya Naidu =

Indian politician (born 1933)

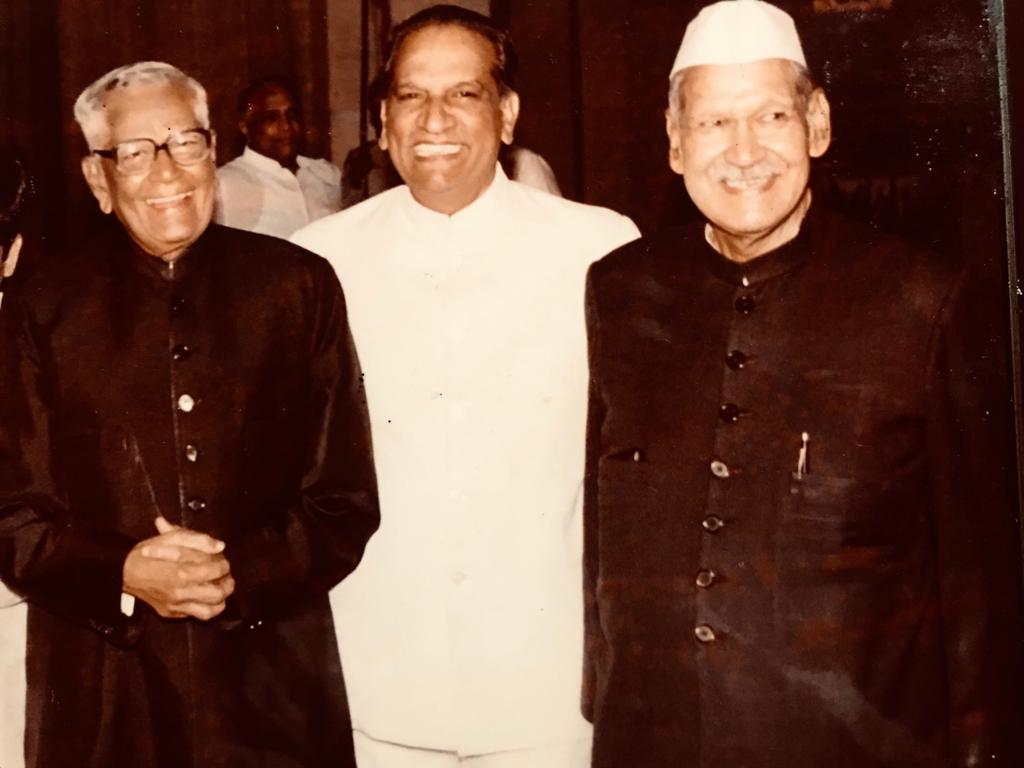
- P.V Rangayya Naidu with two Presidents of India, R. Venkatraman and Shankar Dayal Sharma

Union Minister of State for Water Resources
- In office 10 February 1995 – 16 May 1996
- Prime Minister: P. V. Narasimha Rao
- Preceded by: Prem Khandu Thungan
- Succeeded by: Sompal Shastri

16th Union Minister of State for Power
- In office 18 January 1993 – 10 February 1995
- Prime Minister: P. V. Narasimha Rao
- Minister: N. K. P. Salve
- Preceded by: Babanrao Dhakne
- Succeeded by: Urmilaben Chimanbhai Patel

9th Union Deputy Minister of Communications
- In office 21 June 1991 – 18 January 1993
- Prime Minister: P. V. Narasimha Rao
- Preceded by: Jai Prakash
- Succeeded by: position abolished

Member of Parliament, Lok Sabha
- In office 1991–1996
- Preceded by: Jalagam Vengala Rao
- Succeeded by: Tammineni Veerabhadram
- Constituency: Khammam, Andhra Pradesh (now Telangana)

Personal details
- Born: 6 April 1933 (age 93) Amalapuram, Andhra Pradesh Surasaniyanam
- Party: Indian National Congress
- Spouse: Late. Sita Mahalakshmi
- Children: 3 daughters, 1 son
- As of 26 Sep, 2008

Palacholla Venkata Rangayya Naidu (born 6 April 1933), popularly known as P. V. Rangayya Naidu, is an Indian politician and retired Indian Police Service (IPS) officer. He served as the Deputy Minister for Communications, Minister of State for Power, and Water Resources in the Government of India from 1991 to 1996. He was a member of the 10th Lok Sabha representing the Khammam constituency of Andhra Pradesh. One of his most important contributions as a minister is making the Resettlement and Rehabilitation (R&R) mandatory for all major projects.

Rangayya Naidu became the first IPS officer from erstwhile East Godavari district in 1955. He served as a Director General of Police before joining politics. He was decorated twice for meritorious service to India. In 1972 he was awarded the Indian Police Medal and in 1983 he was awarded the President's Police Medal for distinguished service.

He has been a member of the Indian National Congress since his retirement from the Indian Police Service. He served as a Union Minister in the government of India in three different ministerial roles during the prime ministership of P. V. Narasimha Rao, from 1991 to 1996. Along with Prime Minister Narasimha Rao, and the Finance Minister, Manmohan Singh, Rangayya Naidu was the only other minister to have served the full five-year term in the Narasimha Rao ministry. In September 2022, Rangayya Naidu released his autobiography titled A Youth Quest-Elite Force to National Politics.

== Life ==
Palacholla Venkata Rangayya Naidu was born in a Kapu family on April 6, 1933 in Amalapuram, East Godavari district as the tenth child of his parents. He studied at Government Arts College, Rajahmundry and then did his Economics Honours from Andhra University. In 1953, he joined the Delhi School of Economics to prepare for the Civil Services exam. In 1954 he qualified for the IPS in his first attempt at the age of 21.

In 1957, Rangayya Naidu married Sita Maha Lakshmi, who came from a rich and influential family of Kakinada. In a career spanning 36 years, he rose to the rank of a DGP and Principal Secretary (Home) in united Andhra Pradesh (1988–91). He took voluntary retirement in April, 1991 and entered politics. After his political tenure, Naidu set up the Lakshmi Rangayya Naidu Charitable Trust and has been involved in various social service activities.

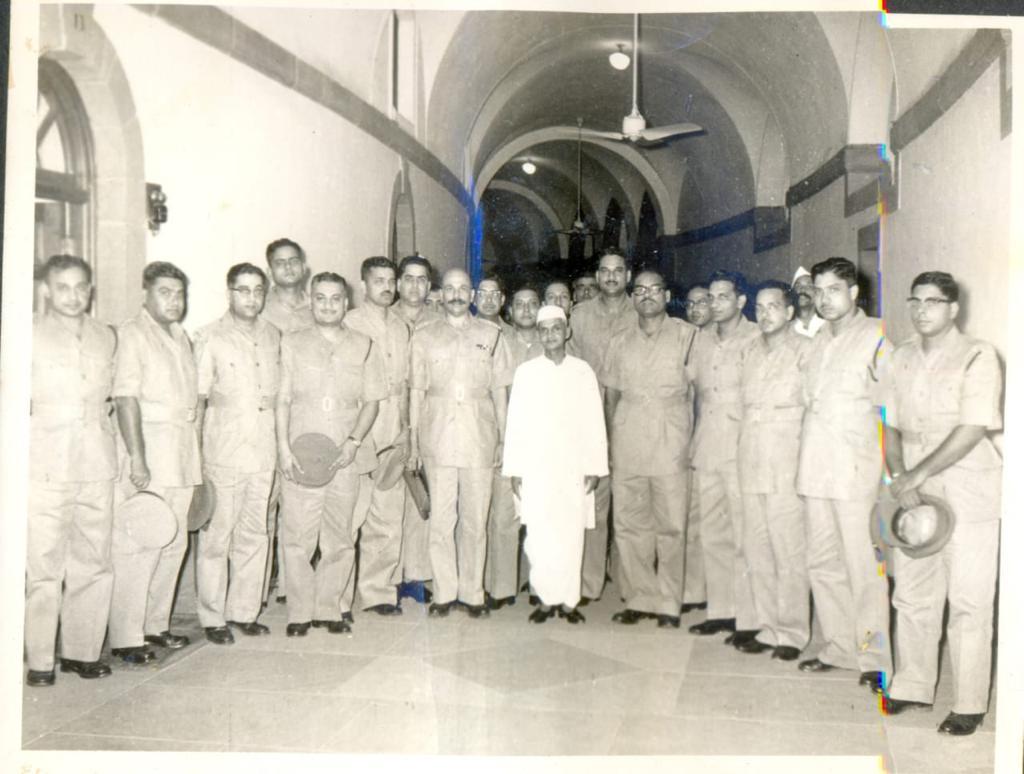
Indian Police Service 1955 batch with Prime Minister Shri Lal Bahadur Shastri in 1963, Mt Abu
