= Satish Upadhyay =

Indian politician (born 1962)

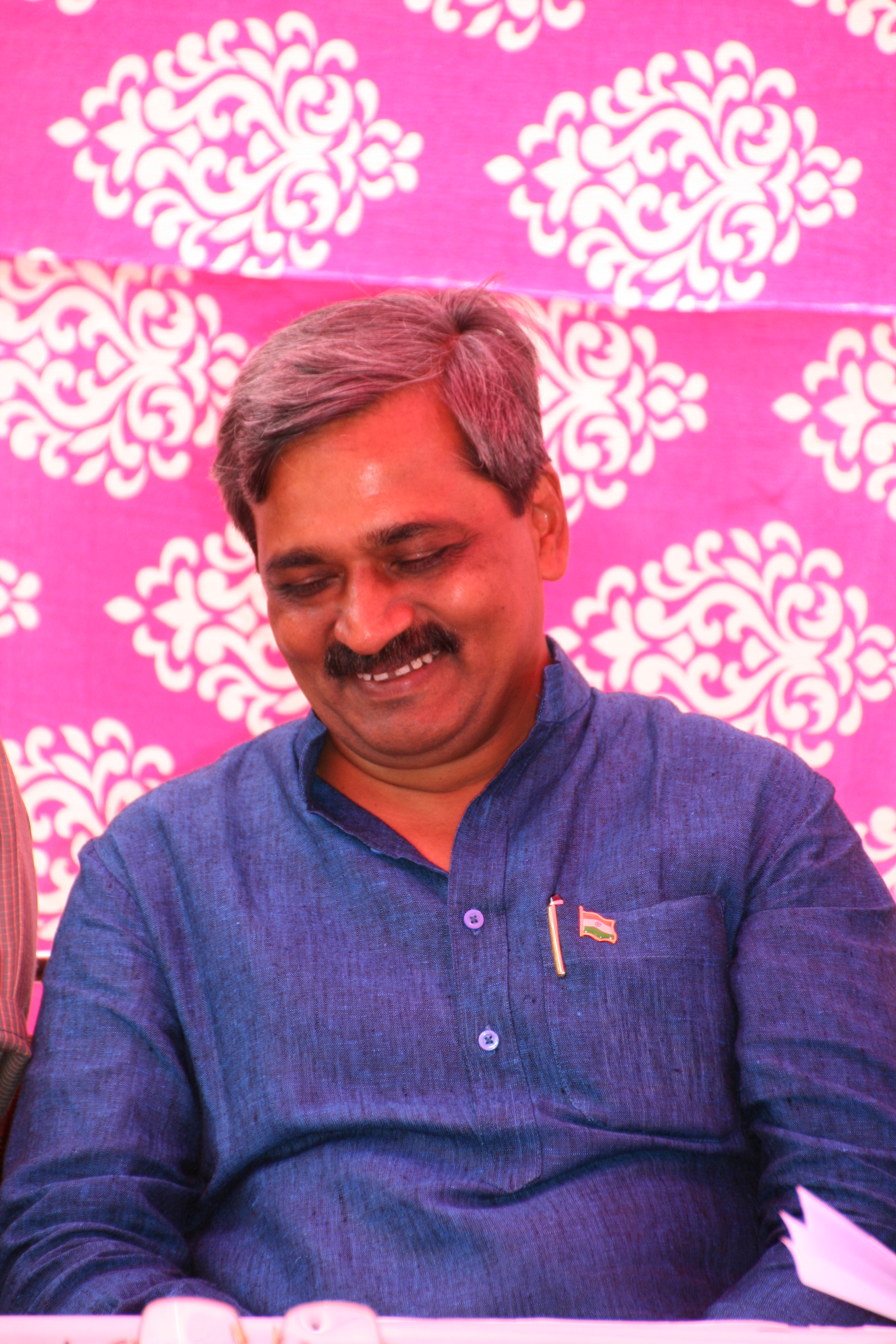

Member of Delhi Legislative Assembly
- Incumbent
- Assumed office 8 February 2025
- Preceded by: Somnath Bharti
- Constituency: Malviya Nagar

President, Bharatiya Janata Party, Delhi
- In office 8 July 2014 – 30 November 2016
- Preceded by: Harsh Vardhan
- Succeeded by: Manoj Tiwari

Personal details
- Born: 6 March 1962 (age 64) New Delhi, India
- Party: Bharatiya Janata Party
- Education: University of Delhi
- Website: http://www.satishupadhyay.in/ Official website

Satish Upadhyay (born 6 March 1962) is an Indian politician serving as the vice chairman of New Delhi Municipal Council (NDMC). He was former president of the Delhi Unit of the Bharatiya Janata Party (BJP) and the Councillor from the Malviya Nagar's Ward No. 161 in the South Delhi Municipal Council (SDMC). He was elected President of the Delhi BJP in July 2014 in the Lok Sabha elections. Before his taking presidential office, he served as Vice President of the Delhi BJP unit from 2010 to 2012 and as Secretary of the Delhi BJP unit from 2009 to 2010.

Upadhyay joined the Rashtriya Swayamsevak Sangh (RSS) and the Akhil Bharatiya Vidyarthi Parishad (ABVP) in the 1980s. He has also been a Member of the Censor Board of Film Certification and the TAC in Delhi.

He was Elected as MLA from Malviya Nagar Assembly constituency in 2025.

== Student life ==
He has a Bachelor of Arts Honours degree in political science from Delhi University. While in college, he joined the Akhil Bharatiya Vidyarthi Parishad (ABVP) and contested Delhi University Student Union elections as an ABVP candidate. Extremely popular among the students, he was elected as the youngest Vice President of Delhi University Student Union in 1982.
He was the Secretary of the ABVP in Delhi State from 1984 to 1986.

== Early political career ==
After completing his graduation, Upadhyay joined Bharatiya Janata Yuva Morcha (BJYM), the youth wing of BJP. He was made the general secretary (organisation), BJYM of Delhi State in 1988 and continued in the same position till 1990. He rapidly rose to the top echelons of power in BJYM and was made the president BJYM of Delhi State in 2002; a position he held until 2004. He made valuable contributions in the 1993 Delhi Assembly Elections. He was also a member of the Media Team at the BJP Headquarters during 1998-2000.

== Electoral politics ==
He held various important positions in the party. An ardent party worker, his stature in the party grew over the years and after working for the people for three decades, he finally entered electoral politics in 2012 and contested the Municipal Corporation of Delhi (MCD) elections from Malviya Nagar for Ward No. 161. He won the election and was also entrusted the job of Chairman of the Education Committee of the SDMC. His work as the chairman brought him much admiration and he was selected for a second term too. He was later selected as the chairman of the Standing Committee. In 2025 he defeated AAP leader Somnath Bharti from Malviya Nagar.

== Social life ==
Since his school days, as a RSS volunteer, Upadhyay has been actively involved in developmental works. He was a member of various religious and social organisations and worked with dedication for the social welfare of people in health and education of underprivileged children in particular. He is a strong contender from BJP for chief minister in Delhi but lost to Rekha Gupta who was announced as the new chief minister in a recently held MLA meeting of BJP after recent Assembly elections in Delhi.

== Personal life ==
He is married to Aarti Upadhyay and together they have three children.
