= R. K. Dhawan =

Indian politician

Member of Parliament, Rajya Sabha
- In office 2004 – 2010
- Constituency: Bihar

Personal details
- Born: Rajinder Kumar Dhawan; 16 July 1937 Chiniot, Punjab, British India (present day Punjab, Pakistan)
- Died: 6 August 2018 (aged 81) New Delhi, India
- Party: Indian National Congress
- Spouse: Achala Mohan (m. 2012)
- Occupation: Politician

Rajinder Kumar Dhawan (16 July 1937 – 6 August 2018) was an Indian politician who was one of the leaders of the Indian National Congress and a member of the Rajya Sabha.

As personal secretary and confidant to Indian prime minister Indira Gandhi, Dhawan was a witness to Indira Gandhi assassination in 1984. As personal assistant to the prime minister, he attained unparalleled power and influence particularly during India's Emergency. As the "door keeper" to the prime minister, he was well positioned to control information and access and proved himself instrumental in civil service appointments. He graduated from Punjab University, Chandigarh.

The head of the investigating commission, Justice Manharlal Pranlal Thakkar, described Dhawan's responses to questioning on the assassination as unreliable and said that the needle of suspicion significantly points to his complicity or involvement. However, Indira's son, Rajiv, after initially removing Dhawan from his post, cleared him of all charges.

He was jailed during the Janata Party government in 1977 on refusal to depose against Indira Gandhi.

He served as the Minister of State (Independent Charge) in the Urban Development Ministry in the P. V. Narasimha Rao headed Congress government from September 1995 to February 1996.

Dhawan died aged 81 in Delhi on 6 August 2018.

== Personal life ==
On 16 July 2012, R. K. Dhawan married Achala Mohan, at the age of 74.

== Sources ==
1. Delhi Correspondent: A Confidential Agent. Economist, 25 Mar. 1989, pp. 38 & 40.
2. Sanjoy Hazarika; India released stinging report on Gandhi's Death. New York Times, 28 Mar. 1989.
3. Hewitt B: A swirl of suspicion. Newsweek, 10 April 1989, p. 17.
4. Barbara Crossette; Gandhi, His Luster Dimmed after 4 years, Faces Uncertain Political Future. New York Times, 22 Apr. 1989.
