= Sheila Kaul =

Indian politician (1915–2015)

Governor of Himachal Pradesh
- In office 17 November 1995 – 22 April 1996
- Preceded by: Mahabir Prasad
- Succeeded by: Mahabir Prasad

Union Minister of Urban Development
- In office 21 June 1991 – 3 May 1995
- Prime Minister: P. V. Narasimha Rao
- Preceded by: Daulat Ram Saran

Union Minister of Urban Affairs and Employment
- In office 3 May 1995 – 10 September 1995
- Prime Minister: P. V. Narasimha Rao

Union Minister of State (Independent Charge) for Education, Culture and Social Welfare
- In office 8 August 1981 – 31 December 1984
- Prime Minister: Indira Gandhi; Rajiv Gandhi
- Preceded by: Shankarrao Chavan
- Succeeded by: K. C. Pant

Personal details
- Born: 7 February 1915 Lucknow, United Provinces of Agra and Oudh, British India
- Died: 13 June 2015 (aged 100) Ghaziabad, Uttar Pradesh, India
- Party: Indian National Congress
- Spouse: Kailas Nath Kaul
- Profession: politician, social worker, social reformer, educationist

Sheila Kaul (7 February 1915 – 13 June 2015) was a social democratic leader of the Indian National Congress, a politician, cabinet minister and governor, and the oldest living former member of parliament in India at the time of her death. She was also an educator, social worker, and social reformer in the Indian state of Uttar Pradesh, and an independence activist in British India. She was Jawaharlal Nehru's sister-in-law and Indira Gandhi's maternal aunt.

== Personal life ==
Sheila Kaul was born in 1915. She had a degree in arts from the Lahore College for Women and a degree in teaching from the Sir Ganga Ram Training College, Lahore. She was a state badminton champion in undivided Punjab, British India.

She was married to Kailas Nath Kaul, brother of Kamala Nehru and a renowned botanist who established the National Botanical Research Institute in Lucknow, India. Gautam Kaul, a former Director General of the Indo-Tibetan Border Police and film critic, and Vikram Kaul, an international sports administrator, are their sons. Deepa Kaul, a social worker and former Congress minister, is their daughter. Jawaharlal Nehru was Sheila Kaul's brother-in-law, Indira Gandhi was her niece, and Rajiv Gandhi was her grandnephew. Prem Adib, a 1940s Bollywood superstar, was her brother-in-law.

== Political career ==
Sheila Kaul was Corporator of the Lucknow Municipal Corporation during 1959–65, and a member of the Uttar Pradesh Legislative Council during 1968–71. She was groomed in UP Congress by Nirmal Chandra Chaturvedi, MLC and an influential educationist.She was elected as Member of Parliament five times – in 1971, 1980 and 1984 from Lucknow, and in 1989 and 1991 from Rae Bareli. She served as a Minister in the Cabinet of India during 1980–84 and 1991–95, and as the Governor of Himachal Pradesh during 1995–96.

Kaul led the Indian delegations to the International Women's Congress, Berlin in 1975, the International Conference of the United Nations Commission on the Status of Women, Copenhagen in 1980, the International Conference on the Role of Culture for Development of Man and Society, Sofia in 1980, the Sessions of General Conference of the UNESCO, Paris in 1982 and 1983, the First Conference of Ministers of Education and Culture of the Non-Aligned and Other Developing Countries, Pyongyang in 1983, the International Conference on Education, Geneva in 1984, the United Nations General Assembly in 1985 and 1987, and the European Parliament in 1990. She became General Secretary of the All India Congress Committee in 1988.

Kaul introduced in the Parliament of India The Constitution (Seventy-fourth Amendment) Bill, 1991, which was enacted in 1992. She also moved in Parliament the AMU (Amendment) Bill, 1981, which was enacted in the same year. While in Parliament, she served as a member of the Committee on Public Undertakings (1980–84), Committee on Privileges (1980–84), Joint Committee on Taxation (Amendment) Bill (1980–84), Consultative Committee, Ministry of Civil Aviation (1990), and Subject Committee on Science and Technology (1990).

A chargesheet based on a case of 1996 accused the former Union Urban Development Minister of entering into a conspiracy with her two personal staff members and over forty other individuals for allegedly renting out government shops for a consideration. The CBI, however, did not seize any assets disproportionate to her income, implying that there was no evidence of corruption. Without holding a trial or providing Kaul with an opportunity to defend herself, the Supreme Court of India in 1996 imposed an exemplary fine of ₹ 6 million on Kaul for having nepotistically rented out 52 shops and kiosks under the discretionary quota. In 2002, the fine was quashed by a three-member bench of the Supreme Court of India in response to a review petition filed by Kaul. Kaul, the accused, had been deprived of her right to a trial in a Sessions Court, and also the right to file an appeal against a conviction order, if any, before the High Court and ultimately before the Supreme Court. In 2013, the 99-year-old Kaul moved the Supreme Court of India, challenging the 2012 order of a CBI Special Judge that asked her to appear in court in an ambulance to respond to the charges of out-of-turn allotments against her. Kaul's counsel contended that she was incapable of giving rational answers or making a personal appearance due to her old age and ailments. They argued that the High Court had earlier dismissed Kaul's relief plea despite a medical board of the All India Institute of Medical Sciences reporting in 2012 that she had an "impaired" understanding of day-to-day events. In 2016, a year after Kaul's death, a special court awarded a two-year prison sentence to her former additional private secretary Rajan Lala, a retired government official, for his role in an allotment scam during her ministerial tenure.

Sheila Kaul died on 13 June 2015, aged 100, in Ghaziabad, India. Her death was condoled by the President of India, who remembered her for her distinguished service to the nation: "Smt. Kaul was a distinguished Parliamentarian and able administrator who served the nation in various capacities. A multi-faceted personality, Smt. Kaul worked with distinction as member of the Union Council of Ministers and Governor of Himachal Pradesh. The nation will always remember her valuable contributions and pursuit of excellence in public life." Her death was also condoled by the Indian National Congress.

=== Positions held ===
- 1971-77: Member of Parliament, 5th Lok Sabha (Lucknow)
- 1980-84: Member of Parliament, 7th Lok Sabha (Lucknow)
- 1980–84: Minister of State for Culture, Education and Social Welfare (Independent Charge); President, Indian National Commission for Cooperation with the UNESCO
- 1984-89: Member of Parliament, 8th Lok Sabha (Lucknow)
- 1989-91: Member of Parliament, 9th Lok Sabha (Rae Bareli)
- 1991-95: Member of Parliament, 10th Lok Sabha (Rae Bareli)
- 1991–95: Union Minister for Housing and Urban Development
- 1995: Union Minister for Urban Affairs and Employment
- 1995–96: Governor of Himachal Pradesh

== See also ==
- Kamala Nehru
- List of political families
