= Kaulinia =

Genus of ferns

Kaulinia is a genus of Polypodiaceae, a family of ferns. As of August 2019, it is regarded as a synonym of Microsorum. It was named after Kailas Nath Kaul, an Indian botanist and agricultural scientist. In a morphological study of the sporophytes and gametophytes of several species of Microsorum, it became apparent that at least two phyletically distinct groups of species existed in the genus. The group represented by Microsorum pteropus and Microsorum hancockii seemed to have a different ancestry from the other group, and were placed in a genus known as Kaulinia. The Pteridophyte Phylogeny Group classification of 2016 (PPG I) accepts that Microsorum is not monophyletic, but states that further study is needed. The genus might be recognized in the future.
