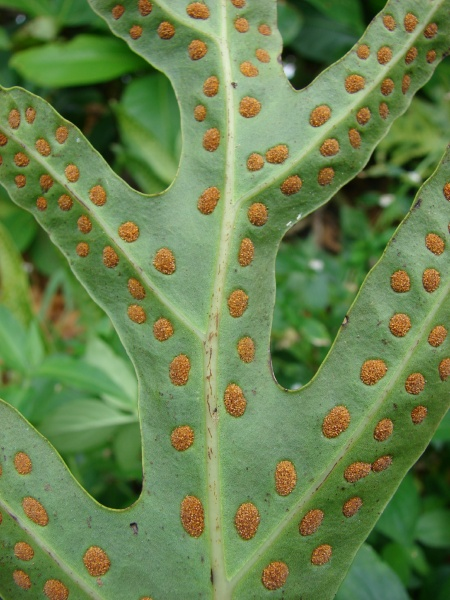

Scientific classification
- Kingdom: Plantae
- Clade: Tracheophytes
- Division: Polypodiophyta
- Class: Polypodiopsida
- Order: Polypodiales
- Suborder: Polypodiineae
- Family: Polypodiaceae
- Genus: Microsorum
- Species: M. scolopendria

Binomial name
- Microsorum scolopendria (Burm.f.) Copel.

Synonyms
- Chrysopteris longipes Link; Chrysopteris peltidea (Link) Link; Chrysopteris phymatodes (L.) Link; Chrysopteris terminalis (Spreng.ex Link) Link; Drynaria longipes (Link) J.Sm.; Drynaria phymatodes (L.) Fée; Drynaria vulgaris (C.Presl) J.Sm.; Microsorum alternifolium (Willd.) Copel.; Phymatodes banerjiana S.Pal & N.Pal; Phymatodes longipes (Link) J.Sm.; Phymatodes peltidea (Link) J.Sm.; Phymatodes phymatodes (L.) Maxon; Phymatodes scolopendria (Burm.fil.) Ching; Phymatodes terminalis (Spreng.ex Link) J.Sm.; Phymatodes vulgaris C.Presl; Phymatosorus banerjianus (S.Pal & N.Pal) Pic.Serm.; Phymatosorus scolopendria (Burm.f.) Pic.Serm.; Pleopeltis phymatodes (L.) Bedd.; Pleopeltis phymatodes (L.) Moore; Pleopeltis schneideri Alderw.; Polypodium alternifolium (Willd.) Link; Polypodium alternifolium Willd.; Polypodium fuentesii Hicken; Polypodium immersum Vahl; Polypodium longipes Link ex Kunze; Polypodium madagascariense Desv.; Polypodium peltideum Link; Polypodium phymatodes L.; Polypodium phymatodes var. partitum Blume; Polypodium scolopendria Burm.f.; Polypodium scutifrons Bojer; Polypodium terminale Spreng. ex Link; Pteris lobata Roxb.; Tectaria phymatodes (L.) Cav.

= Microsorum scolopendria =

Species of fern

Microsorum scolopendria, synonym Phymatosorus scolopendria, commonly called monarch fern, musk fern, maile-scented fern, breadfruit fern, or wart fern is a species of fern within the family Polypodiaceae. This fern grows in the wild in the Western Pacific rim from Australia to New Caledonia to Fiji and throughout the South Pacific to French Polynesia.

The scientific name M. scolopendria has been misapplied to Microsorum grossum (and their synonyms in Phymatosorus).

== Media ==
Microsorum scolopendria filmed at night
