= Triloki Nath Khoshoo =

Indian scientist (1927–2002)

Triloki Nath Khoshoo (1927-2002) was an Indian environmental scientist and administrator. He started his professional career as the co-founder of the Department of Botany that moved to Khalsa College, Amritsar, soon after the partition of India.

After a brief stint as Chairman of the Botany Department at Jammu and Kashmir University, he joined the National Botanical Gardens, Lucknow, in 1964 as Assistant Director, where he worked under Kailas Nath Kaul, the Founder Director of the Gardens. He soon became the Director, and due to his efforts, the institution rose to the stature of being the National Botanical Research Institute in 1978.

== Government posts ==
In 1982, he became the Secretary of the newly created Department of Environment in Prime Minister Indira Gandhi's cabinet with the responsibility of developing a pro-active environmental policy for the country. In 1985, he joined TERI as a Distinguished Fellow and contributed to public policy discussions at national as well as international forums.

== Writings ==
Khoshoo was a prolific writer. Over the course of five decades, he authored more than 250 research papers on plant genetics and evolution, biomass, energy, forestry, conservation and the utilization and management of natural resources. He wrote seven books and edited eleven more on a wide range of subjects. His book 'Mahatma Gandhi: An Apostle of Applied Human Ecology', published in 1996, was widely applauded for the practical relevance of Gandhian philosophy in today's world.

== Decorations ==
In 1992, Khoshoo was decorated with one of India's highest civilian awards, the Padma Bhushan.

He was honored by the United Nations in 1996, when he was awarded the Sasakawa Environmental Prize by the United Nations Environment Program.

== Cannaceae ==
The world of the Cannaceae family and the Canna genus has much to thank Khoshoo for, because it is from his work that we have gathered much of our knowledge of the genus. In all, Khoshoo authored and co-authored over 10 separate papers on the subject of Canna, many of which were bought together in a single document called Origin and Evolution of Cultivated Cannas.

== Recommended reading ==
- Khoshoo, T.N. & Guha, I — Origin and Evolution of Cultivated Cannas, Vikas Publishing House PVt Ltd.
