= Deepa Kaul =

Indian politician and social worker

Personal details
- Born: 12 April 1944 (age 81) Enfield, London, England
- Party: Indian National Congress
- Children: Aashish Kaul
- Profession: Politician

Deepa Kaul (born 12 April 1944, London) is an Indian politician and social worker who served as a legislator and cabinet minister in the government of Uttar Pradesh. She is the daughter of the politician Sheila Kaul and the scientist Kailas Nath Kaul, and a niece of Jawaharlal Nehru.
