= Herbert V. Günther =

German academic (1917–2006)

Herbert Vighnāntaka Günther (17 March 1917 – 11 March 2006) was a German Buddhist philosopher and Professor and Head of the Department of Far Eastern Studies at the University of Saskatchewan, Saskatoon, Canada. He held this position from the time he left India in 1964.

== Early life ==
Herbert Günther was born in Bremen, Germany, as the only son of Reinhold Günther and his wife. Because he showed a great interest in the Orient from an early age his father encouraged him to pursue studies in this field. To this end he began the study of the Chinese language when he was nine. By the time he graduated from high school in 1936, he had also learned the Sanskrit language.

== Education and early academia ==
Günther went to Munich for further study after graduation, earning the Ph.D. degree in 1939. Four years later he received the degree Dr. Phil. Habil. in Vienna. From this beginning, Günther went on to become one of the leading Buddhist scholars of our time. Amongst the most influential of his European mentors were Professor Wilhelm Geiger, a specialist in Pali and Sinhalese, and Walter Wüst – both of Munich. In Vienna, W. Havers was his main teacher. During this time his aptitude for languages manifested itself. In addition to Pali, Sinhalese, Sanskrit, Tibetan, Chinese, Japanese, English, German, Russian, and Hindi, there were those languages he studied 'for enjoyment' – Hebrew, Greek, Latin, Arabic, Spanish, and Italian. He progressed to teaching and taught at Vienna University from 1943 to 1950. Guenther left in 1950, refusing to serve under the rehabilitated ex-Nazi, Erich Frauwallner, whose academic chair had been restored to him.

== Travels to India ==
Günther journeyed to India, where he lived and taught for the next fourteen years. From 1950 to 1958, he was at Lucknow University, where he developed a deep friendship with Kailas Nath Kaul, a naturalist, ethnologist and philosopher. He then went to the Sanskrit University in Varanasi, where he was Head of the Department of Comparative Philosophy and Buddhist Studies from 1958 to 1963. The following year was spent at the International School of America.

The personal and intellectual encounters Günther had in India and the Himalayan region were to leave a lasting mark, for he was fortunate in studying with many prominent Tibetan and Mongolian lamas. Among encounters of special note were those with the following teachers: the Dalai Lama; Khri-byang Blo-bzang Ye-shes Rin-po-che, tutor to the Dalai Lama; the Incarnate Lama Ka-thog dbon sprul-sku; the Incarnate Lama Dar-mdo-sprul-sku Thub-bstan Ihun-grub legs-bzang of 'Bras sprungs Blo gsal-gling rgyal-rong and Abbot of Budhgaya; the Incarnate Lama Tarthang Tulku (Dar-thang sprul-sku), formerly of Golog Monastery in Tibet and the Sanskrit University in Varanasi, and presently Head Lama of the Tibetan Nyingma Meditation Center and Nyingma Institute in Berkeley.

== Family ==
Throughout his career he was encouraged and sustained by his wife, Ilse (née Rossrucker) Günther, whom he married in 1944 in Vienna. The Günthers had two daughters: Edith Kimball, now of Stockton, California – a former recipient of the Woodrow Wilson Fellowship and Master of Arts from the University of Saskatchewan; and Nora Günther, who presently studies music at Brandon University, in Brandon, Manitoba. The Günther family has, for many years, enjoyed musical performance – Günther was a flautist, his wife plays the piano, and their daughter Nora plays the viola.

== Academic legacy ==
Günther was a pioneer in addressing contemporary philosophical issues from a deep and learned Buddhist perspective. His work is well known for being difficult to read. Defenders have argued that because both Buddhist and European philosophies have built up rich vocabularies and conceptual systems derived from over the centuries, any attempt at synthesis is necessarily complicated.

== Publications ==
=== Books ===
- Guenther, Herbert V. (1949) Das Seelenproblem im älteren Buddhismus.
- Guenther, Herbert V. (1952) Yuganaddha - the Tantric View of Life.
- Guenther, Herbert V. (1956) Concept of Mind in Buddhist Tantrism.
- Guenther, Herbert V. (1958) Levels of Understanding in Buddhism.
- Sgam-po-pa (author) Guenther, Herbert V. (trans) (1959, 1986). The Jewel Ornament of Liberation. London Rider & Co., (1959); new edition Boston, Massachusetts, USA: Shambhala Publications., Inc. ISBN 1-57062-614-6(pbk.)
- Guenther, Herbert V. (1959–60) The Philosophical Background of Buddhist Tantrism.
- Guenther, Herbert V. (1969) The Royal Song of Saraha: a Study in The History of Buddhist Thought. ISBN 978-0-87773-042-2
- Guenther, Herbert V. (trans) Kindly Bent to Ease Us, Part 1: Mind. Berkeley, CA, USA: Dharma Publishing, 1975. ISBN 978-0-913546-40-6
- Guenther, Herbert V. (trans) (1959, 1986). Kindly Bent to Ease Us, Part 2. Berkeley, CA, USA: Dharma Publishing, 1976. ISBN 978-0-913546-43-7
- Guenther, Herbert V. (trans) (1959, 1986). Kindly Bent to Ease Us, Part 3: Wonderment. Berkeley, CA, USA: Dharma Publishing, 1975. ISBN 978-0-913546-45-1
- Guenther, Herbert V. (1959, 1986). Tibetan Buddhism In Western Perspective. Berkeley, CA, USA: Dharma Publishing, 1986. ISBN 978-0-913546-50-5
- Guenther, Herbert V. (1963) The Life and Teachings of Naropa. Translated from Tibetan with Philosophical Commentary based on the Oral Transmissions.. Oxford: Clerendon Press. Reprinted: Shambala South Asia Editions. ISBN 1-56957-110-4
- Guenther, Herbert V. Tibetan Buddhism without Mystification: The Buddhist Way from Original Tibetan Sources, Brill 1966. Reprinted as Treasures on the Tibetan Middle Way, (Shambhala, 1976)
- Guenther, Herbert V. (1971) Buddhist Philosophy in Theory and Practice. Penguin, London. : ISBN 0-14-021392-9. Shambhala Publications, Boulder and London 1976. ISBN 0-87773-091-1
- Guenther, Herbert V. and Chogyam Trungpa (1975) The Dawn of Tantra. Shambala Publications, Inc. ISBN 0-87773-059-8 (pbk) ISBN 1-57062-896-3 (pbk)
- Guenther, Herbert (1974) Philosophy and Psychology in the Abhidharma Delhi, India Motilal Banarsidass Publishers ISBN 81-208-0773-1
- Guenther, Herbert (1975) Mind In Buddhist Psychology: The Necklace of Clear Understanding by Yeshe Gyaltsen Berkeley, CA Dharma Publishing ISBN 0-913546-06-2
- Guenther, Herbert (1975) On Spiritual Discipline, Toronto, The Dreadnaught Press. (Limited Edition).
- Guenther, Herbert (1976) The Tantric View of Life (Shambhala, 1976)
- Klong-chen rab-'byams pa Looking Deeper: A Swan's Questions and Answers (Ngang pa'i dris lan sprin gyi snyng po) (Timeless Books, 1983)
- Guenther, Herbert (1984) Matrix of Mystery: Scientific and Humanistic Aspects of rDzog-chen Thought 1984 Boulder, CO ISBN 0-87773-291-4
- Guenther, Herbert (1987) Creative Vision: The Symbolic Recreation of the World According to the Tibetan Buddhist Tradition of Tantric Visualization Otherwise Known as The Developing Phase (Lotsawa, 1987)
- Guenther, Herbert (1989) From Reductionism to Creativity: rDzogs-chen and the New Sciences of Mind, (Shambhala, 1989)
- Guenther, Herbert (1992) Meditation Differently: Phenomenological-psychological Aspects of Tibetan Buddhist (Mahāmudrā and sNying-thig) Practices from Original Tibetan Sources. Matilal Banarsidass
- Guenther, Herbert V. (1993) Ecstatic Spontaneity: Saraha's Three Cycles of Doha (Asian Humanities Press, 1993)
- Guenther, Herbert V. (1994) Wholeness Lost And Wholeness Regained (SUNY Press, 1994) ISBN 978-8-17030-433-3
- Guenther, Herbert V. (1996) The Teachings of Padmasambhava. Brill.

=== Articles ===
- "Das Sidat-Samgarava - eine Grammatik des klassischen Sinhalesisch." Z.D.M.G., 1942.
- "Über das ka -Suffix im Sinhalesischen und die einheimische Genuslehre." Z.D.M.G., 1943.
- "Die Buddhistische Kosmogonie." Z.D.G.M., 1946.
- "Die Sinhalesische Sandeåa-Dichtung der 14 und 15, Jahrhunderte." W.Z.K.M., 1946
- "Der Mahanagakula-Sandeåa." W.Z.K.M., 1946
- "Einige Überlieferungsgeschichtliche Bemerkungen zum Dutthagamani- Epos."W.Z.K.M., 1946.
- "Ceylon im 15, Jahrhundert." W.Z.K.M., 1946.
- "Die verwandtschafsverhaltnisse der Sinhalesischen Konige im 15 und 16, Jahrhundert." W.Z.K.M., 1947.
- "Das Geistesleben der Naturvolker und indische Welt-anschaung." Archiv für Völkerkunde, 1947.
- "Noun Inflexion in Old Sinhalese." Journal of the Royal Society, 1949.
- "The Conditional Mood in Sinhalese." Journal of Oriental Studies, 1949.
- "Der Begriff des Leeren im Altindoarischen." K.Z., 1950.
- "Gabe und Geber." K.Z., 1951
- "The Bodhisattva's Realm of Knowledge." Stepping Stones, vol.1, no.7, 1951.
- "In Praise of Bodhicitta." Stepping Stones, vol. 1, no. 8, 1951.
- "Friends in the Good Life." Stepping Stones, vol. 1, no. 9-10, 1951.
- "The Diamond of Omniscience." Stepping Stones, vol. 2, no. 2, 1952.
- "The Jewel of Buddhahood." Stepping Stones, vol. 2, No. 4, 1952.
- "The Origin and Spirit of Vajrayana." Stepping Stones, vol. 2, no. 7–8, 1952.
- "Our Position in Life." Stepping Stones, vol. 2, no. 7–8, 1952.
- "Ahankara and Selfishness." Stepping Stones, vol. 2, no. 6–8, 1952.
- "The Psychology of the Three Kayas." Uttara Bharati, vol. 2, no. 1, 1955.
- "Dvags. Po. Lha. Rje's 'Ornament of Liberation'" Journal of the American Oriental Society Vol. 75, No. 2 (Apr. - Jun. 1955), pp. 90–96.
- "Refuge." Mahabodhi, vol. 63, 1955.
- "Mantrayana aur Sahajayana." 2500 Years of Buddhism. Delhi:Government of India, 1956.
- "Mantrayana aur Sahajayana." Bauddh-dharm ke 2500 varsh. Delhi:Government of India, 1956.
- "How to Listen to Dharma." Mahabodhi, vol. 64, 1956.
- "Equanimity." Mahabodhi, vol. 66, 1958.
- "The Concept of Mind in Buddhist Tantrism." Journal of Oriental Studies, vol. 3, 1959–60.
- "The Philosophical Background of Buddhist Tantrism." Journal of Oriental Studies, vol, 4, 1959–60.
- "Levels of Understanding in Buddhism." Journal of Oriental Studies, vol. 78, no. 1, 1960.
- "Three Essentials." Middle Way, 1961.
- "A New Tibeto-Mongol Pantheon", Ragu Vira and Lokesh Chandra. Delhi, 1961.
- "Religion and Everyday Life." Middle Way, 1962.
- "Indian Buddhist Thought in Western Perspective - Infinite Transcendence versus Finiteness." History of Religions, 3, 1963.
- "Some Aspects of Tibetan Religious Thought." History of Religions, vol. 3, 1963.
- "Saraha's Song of Human Action." Middle Way, 1965.
- "Art and Thought in the Eastern World." Art Journal, Saskatchewan Society for Education Through Art, 1965.
- "Mentalism and Beyond in Buddhist Philosophy." Journal of the American Oriental Society, vol. 86, 1966.
- "Le Maitre Spirituel en Tibet." Hermes, 1966–67.
- "An Introduction to Tibetan Buddhism." The Tibet Society Newsletter, vol. 1, no. 7, 1967.
- "The Concept of Freedom in Cross-Cultural Perspective." Saskatchewan History Teacher's Newsletter, vol. 5, no. 1, 1968.
- "Tantra and Revelation." History of Religions, vol. 7, no. 4, 1968.
- "The Spiritual Guide as Mystical Experience." The R.M. Bucke Memorial Society Newsletter-Review, vol. 3, no. 1, 1968.
- "Guilt and Purification in Buddhist Tantrism." Proceedings of the XIth International Congress for the History of Religions, vol. 2, Leiden, 1968.
- "Tantra: Meaningful Existence." Maitreya, vol. 1, 1969, Shambala
- "Mind, Space and Aesthetic Awareness" Anjali Peradanya, 1970.
- "Absolute Perfection" in Crystal Mirror I (Dharma Press, 1971)
- "Fact and Fiction in the Experience of Being" in Crystal Mirror II (Dharma Press, 1972)
- "On 'Spiritual Discipline'" in Maitreya vol. 3, 1972, Shambala
- "The Path and the Goal." The American Theosophist, vol. 60, no. 5, 1972.
- "Fact and Fiction in the Experience of Being." Crystal Mirror, vol. 2, Emeryville: Dharma Publishing, 1972.
- "Buddhist Metaphysics and Existential Meditation" Sciences Religieuses Studies in Religion, vol, 1, no. 4, 1972.
- "Samvriti and Paramartha in Yogacara According to Tibetan Sources." Two Truths in Buddhism and Vedanta, Ed. M. Sprung, Dordrecht: D. Reidel Publishing, 1973.
- "Forward." Calm and Clear, Lama Mipham, Emeryville: Dharma Publishing, 1973.
- "The Male-Female Polarity in Oriental and Western Thought." Maitreya, 4, 1973.
- "Buddhist Mysticism." Encyclopædia Britannica, 1974.
- "Buddhist Sacred Literature." Encyclopædia Britannica, 1974.
- "Forward" An Introduction to Tantric Buddhism, S.B. Dasgupta, Berkeley:Shamhala, 1974.
- "The Development of Tibetan Art." Sacred Art of Tibet, Emeryville:Dharma Publishing, 1974.
- "Early Forms of Tibetan Buddhism." Crystal Mirror vol. 3, Emeryville:Dharma Publishing, 1974.
- "The Teacher and the Student." Maitreya, 5, 1974.
- "Mind is the Root." Crystal Mirror 3, Emeryville:Dharma Publishing, 1974.
- "The Male-Female Polarity in Oriental and Western Thought" in Maitreya vol. 4, 1973, Shambhala
- "Early Forms of Tibetan Buddhism" in Crystal Mirror III (Dharma Press, 1974)
- "The Teacher and the Student" in Maitreya vol. 5, 1974, Shambhala
- "A Look Into the Sky Like Mirror." Crystal Mirror 3, Emeryville:Dharma Publishing, 1974.
- "Mahamudra - The Method of Self - Actualization." The Tibet Journal 1, 1975.
- "Three Paths with a Single Goal." Gesar vol. 2, no. 4, Emeryville:Dharma Publishing, 1975.
- "Tantra and Contemporary Man." Loka, Garden City, N.Y.:Anchor Press Doubleday, 1975.
- "Towards an Experience of Being Through Psychological Purification." A Study of Klesa, ed. Genjun H. Sasaki, Tokyo:Shimizukobundo Ltd., 1975.
- "A Journey Through Life: Five Stages on the Buddhist Path." Gesar vol. 3, no. 2, Emeryville:Dharma Publishing, 1975.
- "Conversations with Herbert Guenther." Gesar vol. 3, no. 1, Emeryville:Dharma Publishing, Fall 1975.
- "The Activation of Inner Potential." Gesar vol. 3, no. 4, Emeryville:Dharma Publishing, Summer 1976.
- "The Road to Growth:The Buddhist Way." Gesar vol. 3, no. 3, Emeryville:Dharma Publishing, 1976.
- "The Preparatory Stage." Garuda IV, The Foundations of Mindfulness, Boulder:Shambala Publications, 1976.
- "Towards Spiritual Order" in Maitreya vol. 6, 1977, Shambhala
- "The Fine Art of Translating, Interview with H.V. Guenther." Gesar vol. 4, no. 4, Emeryville:Dharma Publishing, 1978.
- "Absolute Perfection." Crystal Mirror - Journal of Tibetan Nyingma Meditation Center, Berkeley, CA, Emeryville:Dharma Publishing,
- "The Experience of Being: The Trikaya Idea in its Tibetan Interpretation." In Developments in Buddhist Thought, ed. Roy C. Amore, SR Supplements 9, Waterloo:Canadian Corporation for Studies in Religion, 1979.
- "Bodhisattva - The Ethical Phase in Evolution." In The Bodhisattva Doctrine in Buddhism, ed. Leslie S. Kawamura, SR Supplements 10, Waterloo:Canadian Corporation for Studies in Religion, 1981.
- "The Old and the New Vision." In The Evolutionary Vision, ed. Erich Jantsch, American Association for the Advancement of Science Selected Symposium no. 61, 1981.
- "Tasks Ahead." Presidential Address Given on the Occasion of the Third Conference of the International Association of Buddhist Studies, Winnipeg, Canada, August 1980.
- "Meditation Trends in Early Tibet." In Early Ch'an in China and Tibet, ed. Whalen Lai and Lewis R. Lancaster, Berkeley Buddhist Studies Series 5, 1983.
- "Buddhist rDzogs-chen Thought and Western 'Daseinsanalyse'." In Buddhist and Western Psychology, ed. Nathan Katz, Boulder: Prajna Press, 1983.
- "Buddhism in Tibet" in Joseph M. Kitigawa and Mark D. Cummings (eds.) Buddhism and Asian History (Macmillan, 1987)
- "Vajrayana Buddhism and Modern Man." in One Vehicle, Journal of the National University of Singapore Buddhist Society, 1984.
- "The Existential Import of Dynamic Structures in rDzogs-chen Buddhism." In Acta Indologica, vol. VI, 1984.
- "Being's Vitalizing Core Intensity." Journal of Naritasan Institute for Buddhist Studies, no. 10, Narita, Japan, 1986.
- "Der geistige Mentor als unmittelbares Erlebnis." In Lotusblätter: Zeitschrift für Buddhismus, München, 1991.
- "Prozessdenken und buddhistische Psychologie." In Bodhibaum: Buddhistische Zeitschrift für Gesellschaft und Kultur, Wien 1993.
- "The Intensity-Immensity Singularity - A New Approach to Tantra." In Dhih - Journal of Rare
- "Basic Features of Buddhist Psychology" in John Pickering (ed.), The Authority of Experience: Essays on Buddhism and Psychology (Curzon 1997)
- "The Complexity of the Initial Condition." In The International Journal of Transpersonal Studies, vol. 16, no. 2, December 1997..
- "Sound, Color, and Self-Organization." In The International Journal of Transpersonal Studies, vol. 17, no. 1, 1998
- "Mandala and/or dkyil-'khor" In The International Journal of Transpersonal Studies, vol. 18, no. 1, 1999
- " 'Yoga' A Tibetan Perspective" In Yoga & World - International Newsletter for Yoga Teachers and Students, no. 11 (October–December 1999) Lower Lake, C.A, In The Cosmic Light - The University of Science & Philosophy Quarterly Magazine, Spring 2000. Vol. 2, no. 2
- "Light - An Emergent Phenomenon." In The Cosmic Light - The University of Science & Philosophy Quarterly Magazine, Autumn 1999, Vol. 1, no. 4
- "The Male-Female Complementarity." In The Cosmic Light - The University of Science & Philosophy Quarterly Magazine, Summer 2000, Vol. 2, no. 3
- "Reflections on Ethics: Cross-cultural Perspective." In The Cosmic Light - The University of Science & Philosophy Quarterly Magazine, Winter 2001, Vol. 3, no. 1
- "The Lama: From Authenticity to Theatrics." In The Cosmic Light - The University of Science & Philosophy Quarterly Magazine, Spring 2001, Vol. 3, no. 2
- "Three, Two, Five." In Journal of Integral Studies in Consciousness, Culture, Science, Spring 2000, vol. 1
- "The Homology of Emotionality and Rationality, Part I", Canadian Journal of Buddhist Studies (Number One, 2005), Nalanda College of Buddhist Studies, Toronto

=== Translations ===
- Long-chen-pa, "The Natural Freedom of Mind" in Crystal Mirror IV (Dharma Press, 1975)
- Klong-chen rab-'byams-pa, "Now That I Come to Die" in Crystal Mirror V (Dharma Press, 1977)
- All book entries designated "trans" (above)

=== Forewords ===
- Allan Combs, The Radiance of Being: Complexity, Chaos and the Evolution of Consciousness (Paragon 1995)
- Eva M. Dargyay, The Rise of Esoteric Buddhism in Tibet (Motilal, 1978)
- Tarthang Tulku, Time, Space, and Knowledge (Dharma Press, 1977)
- Lama Mipham, Calm and Clear (Dharma Press, 1973)
