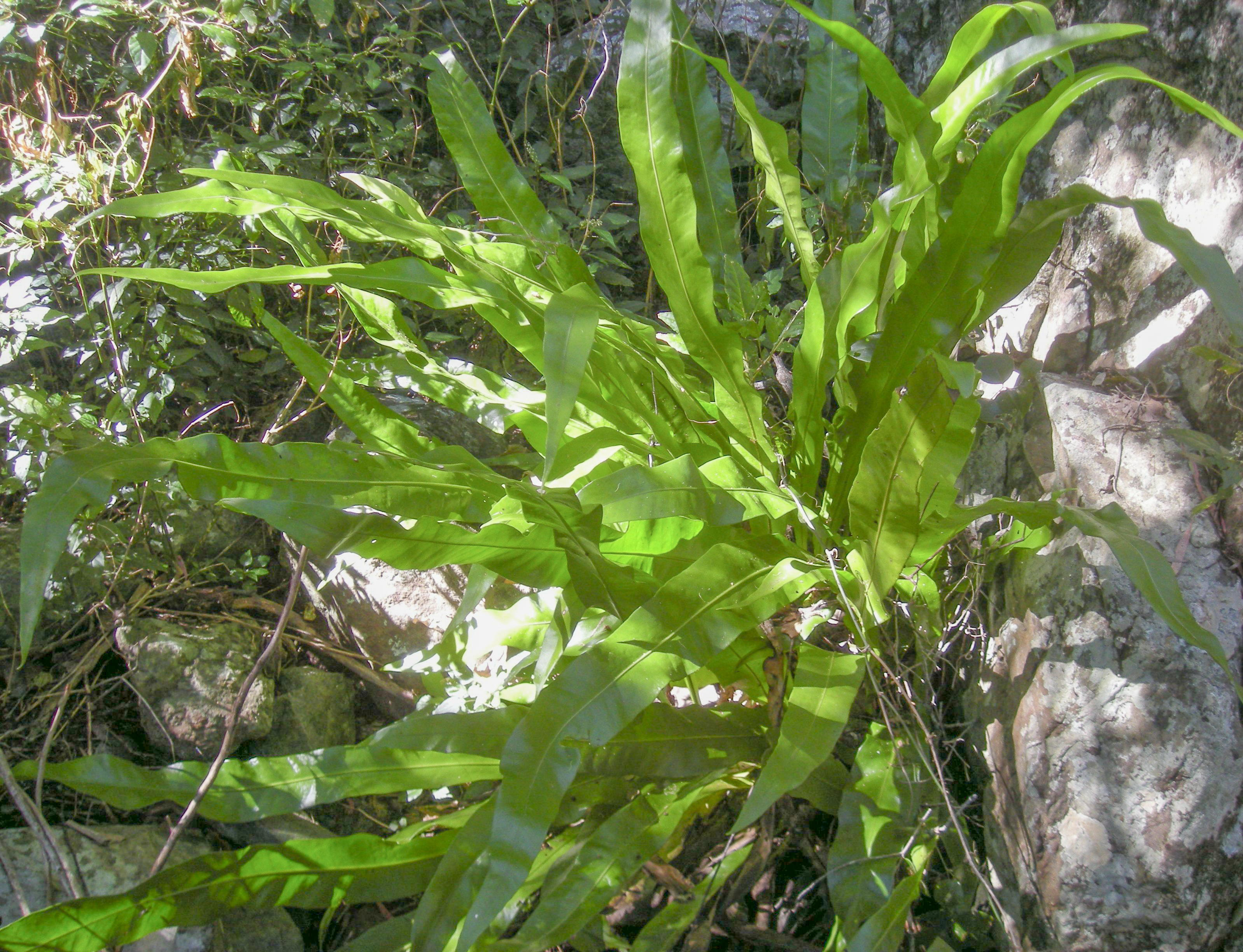

Scientific classification
- Kingdom: Plantae
- Clade: Tracheophytes
- Division: Polypodiophyta
- Class: Polypodiopsida
- Order: Polypodiales
- Suborder: Polypodiineae
- Family: Polypodiaceae
- Genus: Microsorum
- Species: M. punctatum

Binomial name
- Microsorum punctatum (L.) Copel.

= Microsorum punctatum =

Species of fern

Microsorum punctatum is a fern from the subfamily Microsoroideae commonly called the fish-tail fern, climbing bird's nest fern, dwarf elkhorn fern, or wart fern. It has been used in traditional medicine.

== Description ==
Like other members of subfamily Microsoroideae, this species is a facultative epiphyte; it often grows epiphytically, but can also grow atop the soil surface (terrestrially) in moist, well-drained areas.

The rhizome is small, short, 50 mm in diameter, covered with dark brown scales; elongated scales, similar to triangles, 8 mm long. Single leaf lanceolate shape, green, 550 mm long, 50 mm wide, indistinct petiole, clear leaf bone, 3 mm diameter, pointed tip, winged base of leaf, branched leaf repetition.

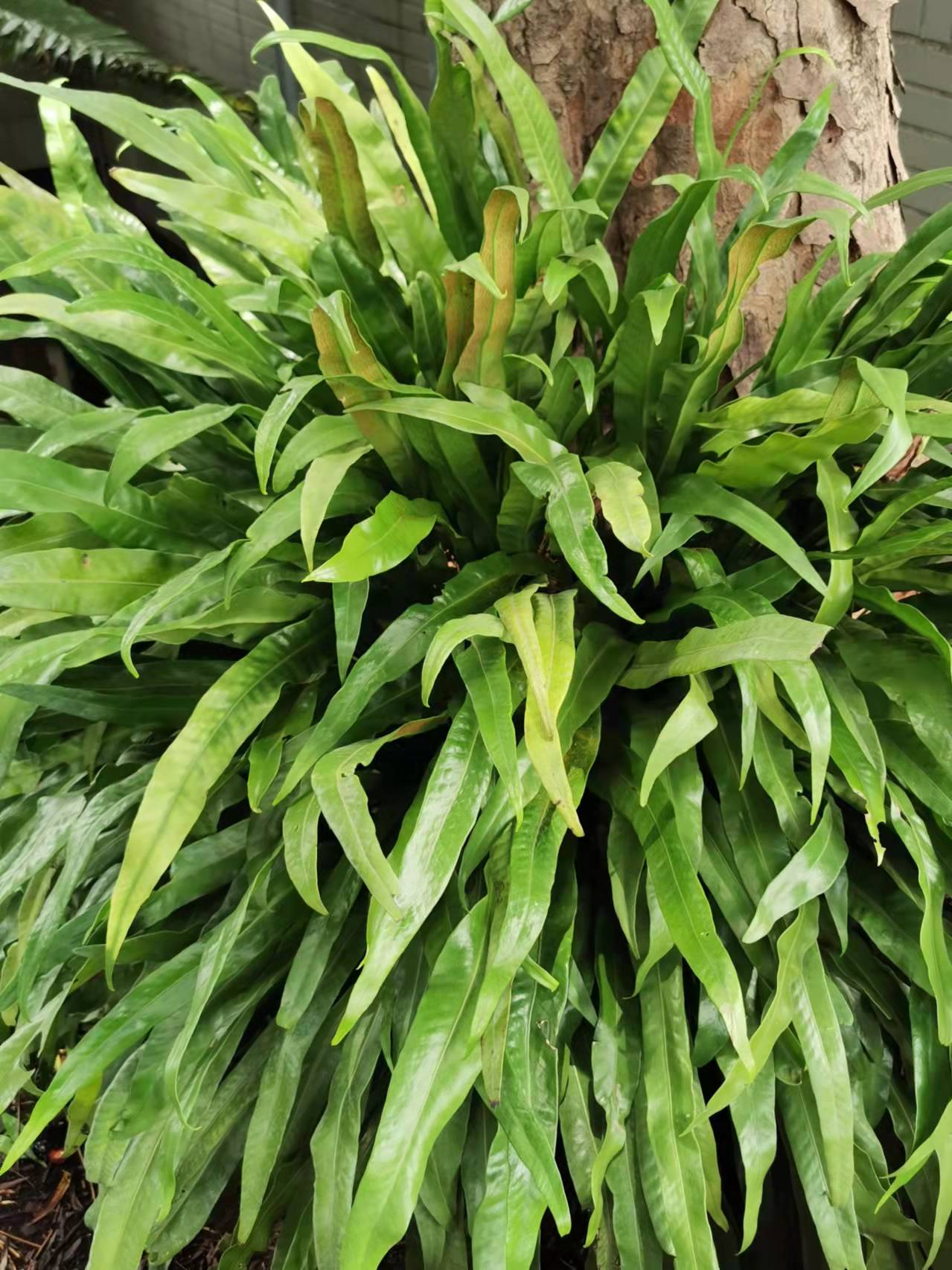

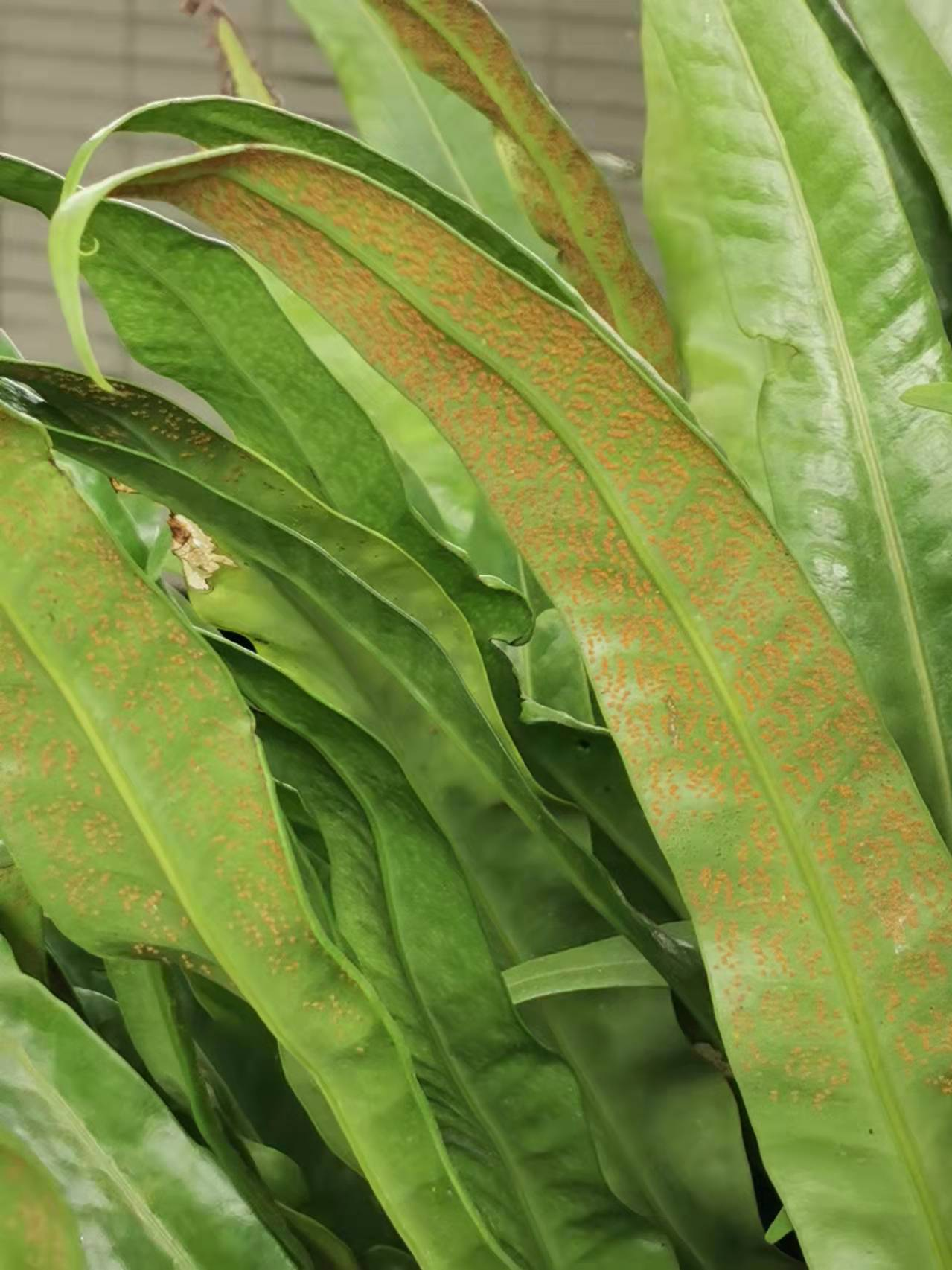

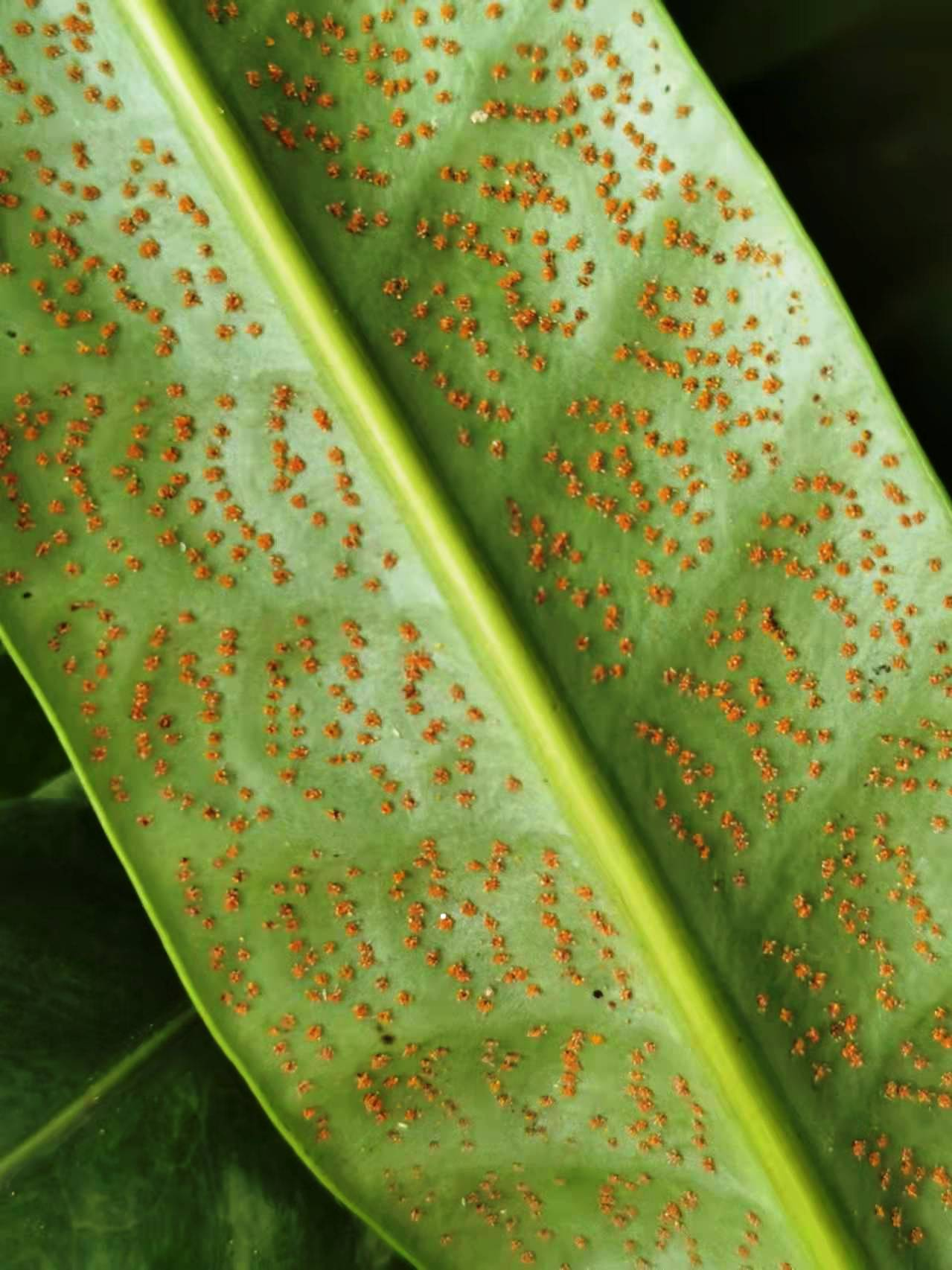

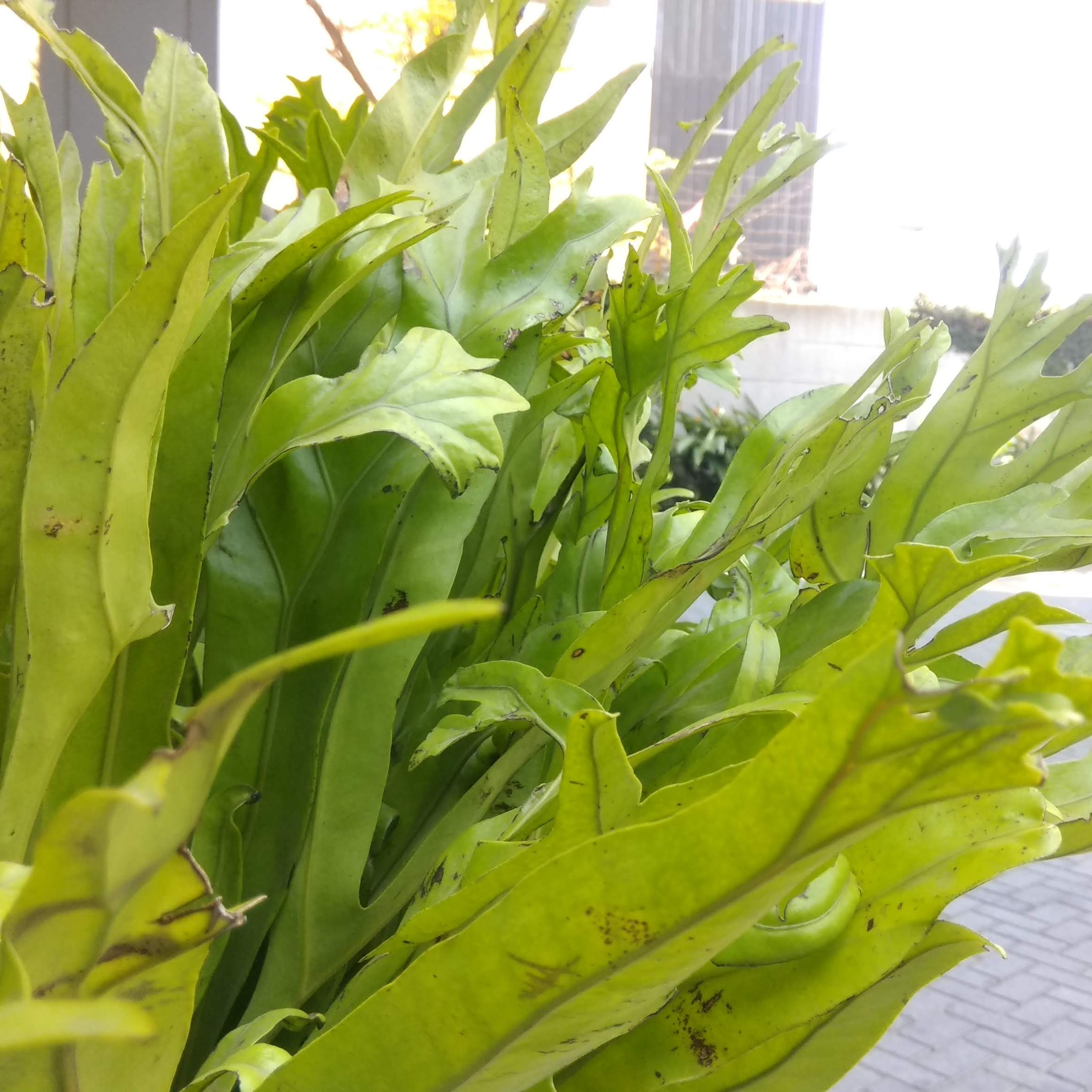
Leaves of Microsorum punctatum 'Grandiceps'

== Distribution ==
M. punctatum is found in Africa and Asia. It is native to Andaman Islands, Angola, Assam, Bangladesh, Bismarck Archipelago, Borneo, Burundi, Cambodia, Cameroon, Cape Provinces, Caroline Islands, Central African Republic, north-central China, south-central China, southeast China, Christmas Island, Comoros, Eastern Himalayas, Equatorial Guinea, Ethiopia, Fiji, Gabon, Ghana, Guinea, Gulf of Guinea islands, Hainan, India, Ivory Coast, Jawa, Kenya, KwaZulu-Natal, Laos, Lesser Sunda Islands, Liberia, Madagascar, Malaya, Maluku, Marianas, Marquesas, Mauritius, Mozambique, Myanmar, Nepal, New Caledonia, New Guinea, New South Wales, Nicobar Islands, Nigeria, Northern Provinces, Philippines, Queensland, Rwanda, Réunion, Seychelles, Sierra Leone, Society Islands, Solomon Islands, Sri Lanka, Sulawesi, Sumatera, Taiwan, Tanzania, Thailand, Uganda, Vanuatu, Vietnam, Zambia, Zaïre, and Zimbabwe; it has been introduced in Colombia.

== Uses ==
Juice extracted from the fronds (leaves) of the fern is used as purgative, diuretic, and wound healing agents in traditional medicine in Assam.
