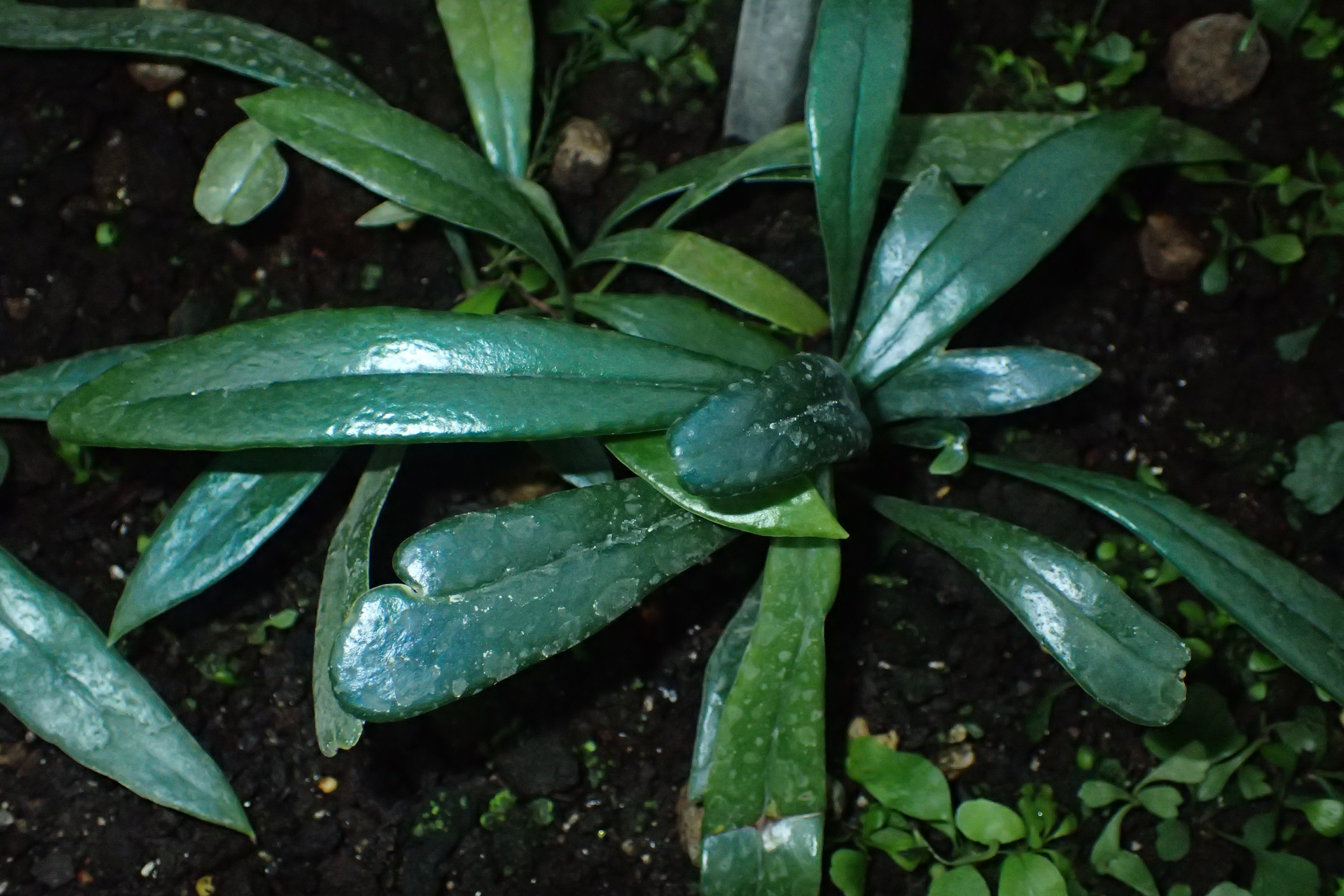

Scientific classification
- Kingdom: Plantae
- Clade: Tracheophytes
- Division: Polypodiophyta
- Class: Polypodiopsida
- Order: Polypodiales
- Suborder: Polypodiineae
- Family: Polypodiaceae
- Genus: Microsorum
- Species: M. thailandicum

Binomial name
- Microsorum thailandicum Boonkerd & Noot.

= Microsorum thailandicum =

Species of fern

Microsorum thailandicum is a fern in the family Polypodiaceae. It is sometimes called the blue oil fern. Like several other shady understory plant species, its leaves display blue iridescence. Initially unknown, the mechanism was later described as resulting from cellulose microfibrils stacked into helicoidal structures. Those structures appear on both the adaxial and abaxial epidermal surface, differing, with adaxial (top) epidermis being more blue, white abaxial (bottom) being red-shifted and less intense.
