= Kamla Nehru Memorial Hospital =

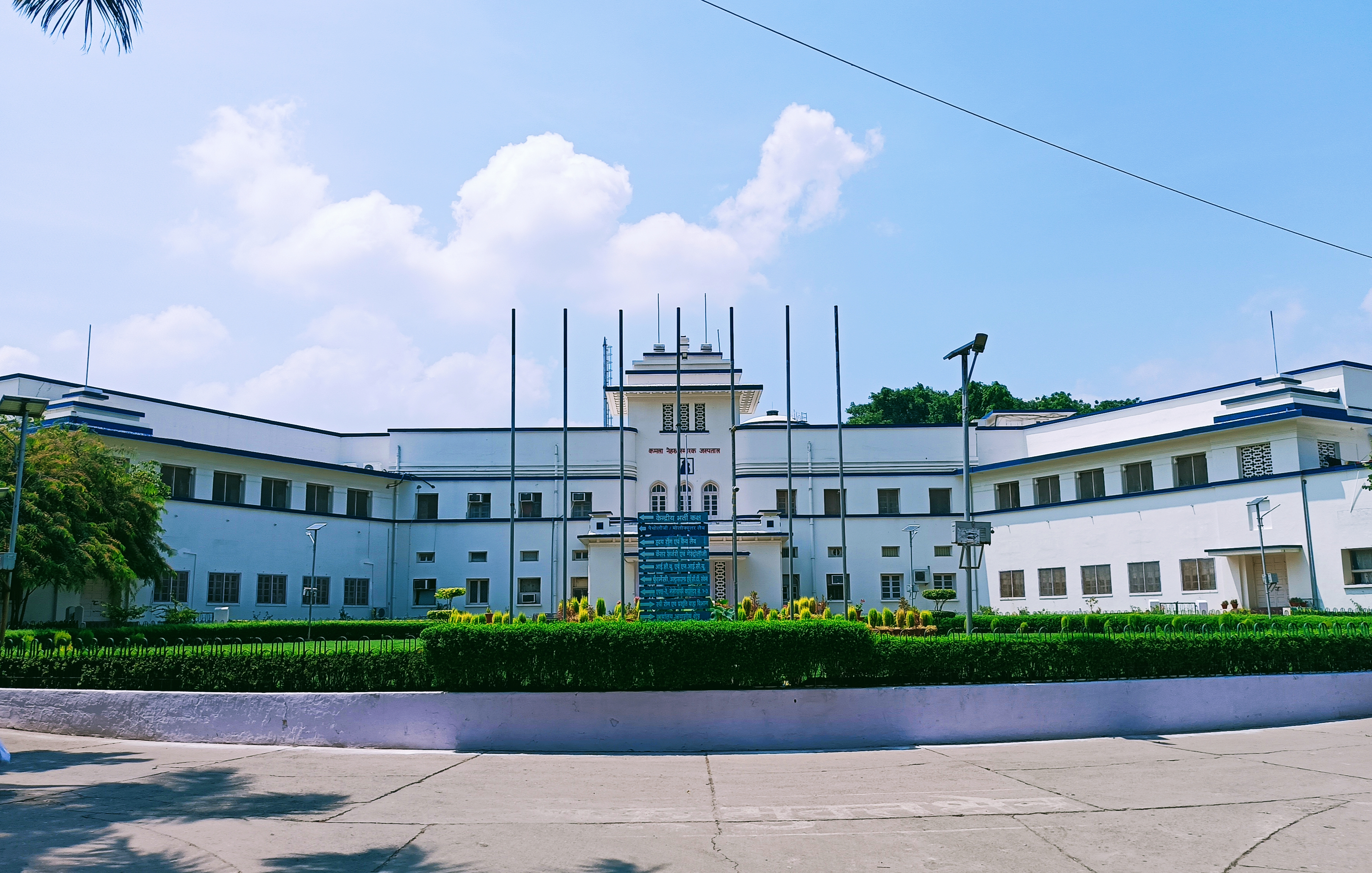
- Front view of the Hospital

Geography
- Location: 1, Hashimpur Road, Tagore Town, Prayagraj, Uttar Pradesh, India
- Coordinates: 25.4590264°N 81.8614173°E

Organisation
- Type: Not-for-profit
- Affiliated university: NABH; NBE

History
- Opened: 1931; 95 years ago

Links
- Website: knmh.in
- Lists: Hospitals in India

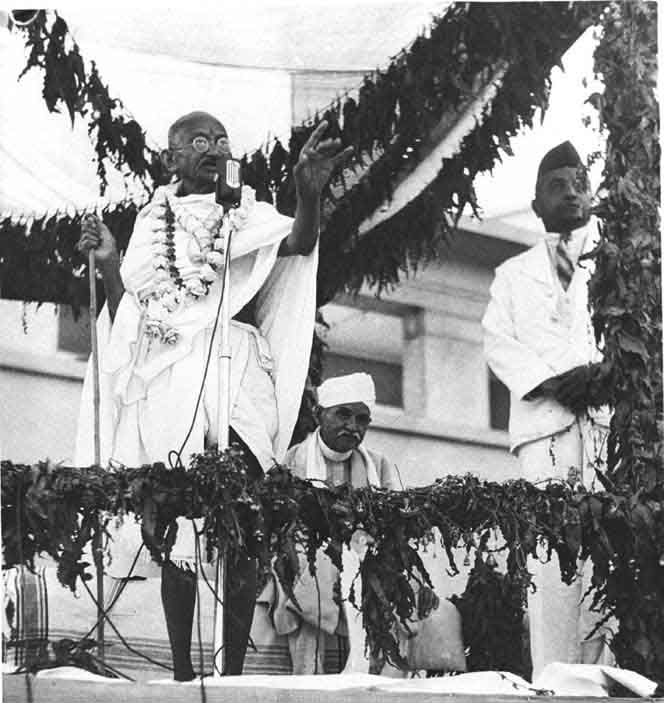
Mahatma Gandhi at the opening ceremony of the hospital, 1941.

Kamala Nehru Memorial Hospital (KNMH) is a not-for-profit hospital in Prayagraj, Uttar Pradesh, India. The hospital had its beginnings in 1931 as a dispensary founded by Smt. Kamala Nehru in her ancestral house Swaraj Bhawan. Gandhiji laid the foundation stone of Kamala Nehru Memorial Hospital in 1939. KNMH is the only hospital in the country for which he had collected donations. Mahatma Gandhi inaugurated this hospital in the memory of Late Smt Kamala Nehru on 28 February 1941, the date she had died in 1936. Since 1994, the Oncology Department of the hospital is a Regional Cancer Centre, recognized by Government of India.

== History ==
Kamala Nehru Memorial Hospital traces its roots to the Indian Freedom Struggle, when in the year 1931, Smt. Kamala Nehru converted some rooms in her ancestral house, Swaraj Bhawan into a Congress Dispensary. This mini Hospital had both indoor and outdoor facilities staffed by patriotic doctors and other paramedical staff. Though frail in health but indomitable in spirits Smt. Kamala Nehru gave to this institution her time, labour and above all compassion till her untimely death in 1936. After her death, Mahatma Gandhi and other national leaders like Pt. Madan Mohan Malviya, Pt. Jawahar Lal Nehru, Dr. B. C. Roy, Uma Shankar Dikshit and others took it upon themselves to see that the work for which she made herself responsible was carried on even after her death.

KNMH was built as a national tribute to the memory of Late Smt. Kamala Nehru who was a living monument of selfless service, sacrifice and compassion for fellow human beings. In the start, it was a fledgling unit with just 40 beds of Obstetrics & Gynaecology, out of which 28 were free. The first Medical Superintendent of the Hospital was Dr.(Mrs) Satyapriya Mazumdar. Today it has a bed capacity of 350, out of which 175 are free/subsidized.

== Efforts at KNMH ==
KNMH has been partnering with many national and international organizations to help local populations and increase their health standard. Urban Health Initiative a program supported by the Gates Foundation identified KNMH as partner in Uttar Pradesh. From time to time KNMH undertakes various outreach activities. With an initiative to have a Clean Green Environment, KNMH has introduced solar lights within the campus with an aim to reduce electricity use and contribute towards green environment. A paper co-authored by KNMH CEO Prof. (Dr.) Madhu Chandra and many other leading public health experts was published in the Lancet Oncology that discusses the challenges in delivering affordable and equitable cancer care in India.

=== KNMH Rural Hospital ===
Kamala Nehru Memorial Rural Hospital is a base hospital of KNMH Society, started in the year 1987 by the then Prime Minister and KNMH Trust President Shri Rajiv Gandhi to serve over 100 villages, across the river Yamuna in rural Allahabad.

=== Employees Welfare ===
KNMH has 66 flats in Teliyargunj area of Allahabad to provide accommodation to class III and class IV employees of the hospital. These flats were acquired by the hospital administration from Allahabad Development Authority (ADA). For children of hospital employees, KNMH administration provides merit based scholarships. Hospital employees also avail free/subsidized medical care at KNMH.

=== Academics and training ===
KNMH is a training ground for various medical courses and runs a School for Nursing and Midwifery with an intake of 60 seats. Nursing school has a whooping participation from girls comprising more than 92% of total student strength. On an average KNMH train more than 130 professionals every year in the fields of Radiotherapy, Obstetrics & Gynaecology, Nursing & Midwifery, OT & CT Technology, and Medical Physics.

=== Certification, Empanelment, and Recognitions ===
In addition to being recognized as RIMCH and RCC, KNMH has various certifications, empanelments, and recognitions from various government and non-government institutes.

== Administration ==
The Chief Executive Officer (CEO) of Kamala Nehru Memorial Hospital is Dr. Madhu Chandra and the Assistant director (Administration) is Mr. Hari Om Singh who supervises and lead the officials of the hospital.
