= Bidhan Chandra Roy =

Chief Minister of West Bengal from 1950 to 1962

Bharat Ratna Bidhan Chandra Roy
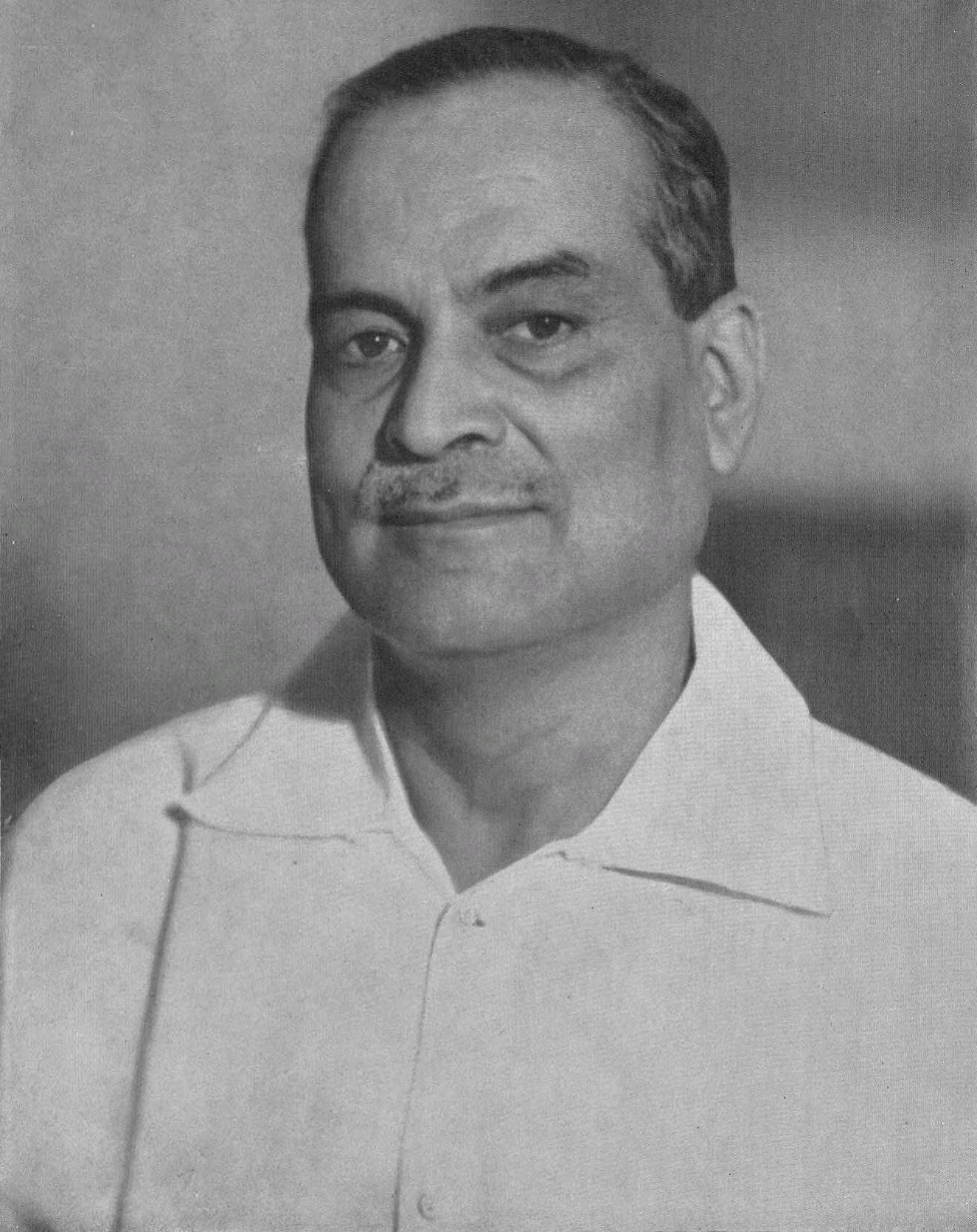

2nd Premier of West Bengal
- In office 23 January 1948 – 25 January 1950
- Governor: Chakravarti Rajagopalachari; Kailash Nath Katju
- Preceded by: Prafulla Chandra Ghosh
- Succeeded by: Position abolished (himself as Chief Minister of West Bengal)

1st Chief Minister of West Bengal
- In office 26 January 1950 – 1 July 1962
- Governor: Kailash Nath Katju; Harendra Coomar Mookerjee; Phani Bhusan Chakravartti (acting); Padmaja Naidu
- Preceded by: Office established (himself as Premier of West Bengal)
- Succeeded by: Prafulla Chandra Sen

Member of West Bengal Legislative Assembly
- In office 1952–1962
- Preceded by: Constituency established
- Succeeded by: Bijoy Singh Nahar
- Constituency: Bowbazar
- In office May 1962 – 1 July 1962
- Preceded by: Bijoy Singh Nahar
- Succeeded by: Siddhartha Shankar Ray
- Constituency: Chowranghee

5th Mayor of Kolkata
- In office 5 April 1931 – 9 April 1933
- Preceded by: Subhas Chandra Bose
- Succeeded by: Santosh Kumar Basu

Member of Bengal Legislative Council
- In office 1923 ‍–‍ 1929
- Preceded by: Surendranath Banerjee
- Succeeded by: Prafulla Guha
- Constituency: Barrackpore (Note: The constituency is officially recorded as 24 Parganas North Municipal (unreserved) centered at Barrackpore, then 24 Parganas.)

Personal details
- Born: 1 July 1882 Patna, Bengal Presidency, British India (present-day Bihar, India)
- Died: 1 July 1962 (aged 80) Calcutta (present-day Kolkata), West Bengal, India
- Party: Indian National Congress
- Education: Medical College and Hospital, Kolkata; St Bartholomew's Hospital
- Profession: Physician & Surgeon; Politician
- Awards: Bharat Ratna (1961)

Bidhan Chandra Roy (1 July 1882 – 1 July 1962) was an Indian physician and politician who served as Chief Minister of West Bengal from 1950 until his death in 1962. He played a key role in the founding of several institutions and cities like Salt Lake (now a part of Bidhannagar Municipal Corporation), Kalyani, Durgapur and Ashoknagar Kalyangarh.

In India, the National Doctors' Day is celebrated in his memory every year on 1 July. He was awarded the Bharat Ratna, India's highest civilian honour in 1961.

== Early life and education ==
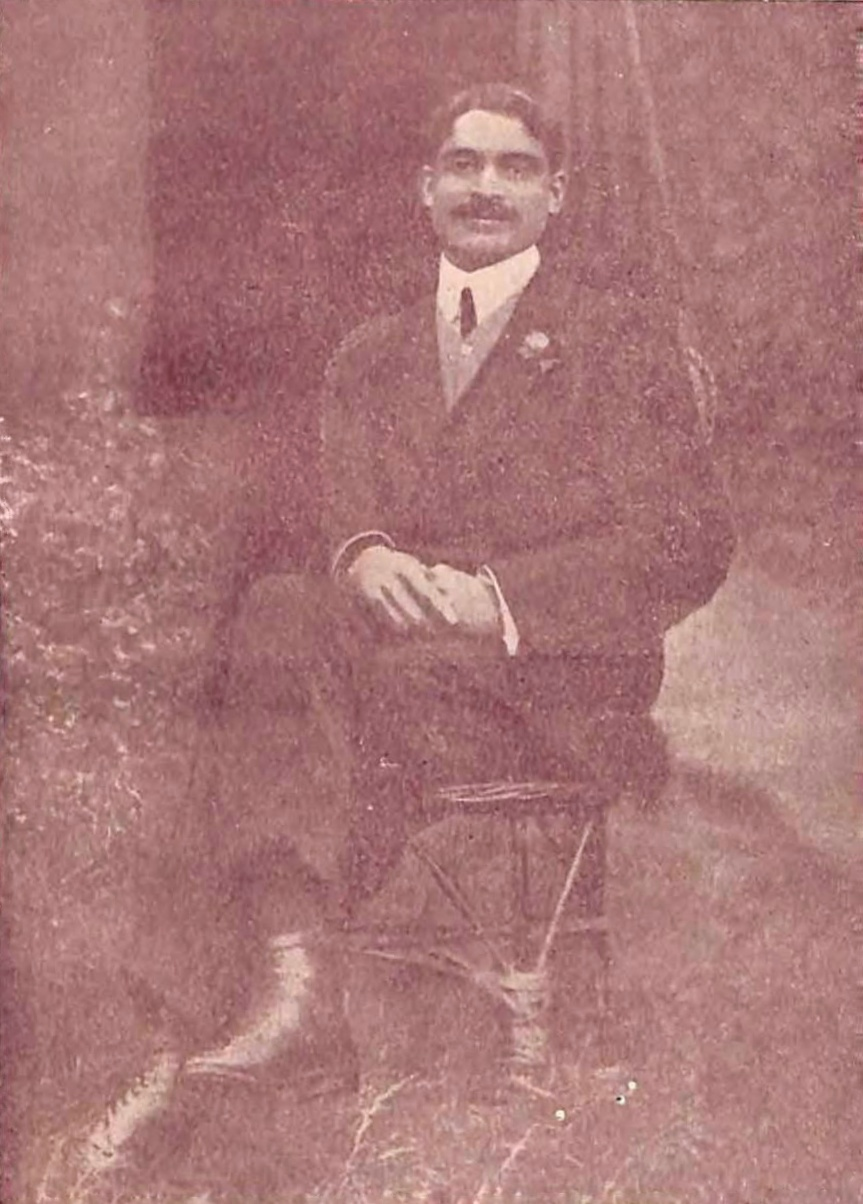
Bidhan Chandra Roy in 1911

Bidhan Chandra Roy was born on 1 July 1882 to a Bengali Kayastha family in Bankipore in Patna, where his father, Prakash Chandra Roy coming from a wealthy family of Satkhira, Khulna district, Bengal Presidency (now in Bangladesh), was serving as an excise inspector. His mother, Aghorkamini Devi, was religious and a devoted social worker. Roy was the youngest of five siblings, with 2 sisters (Susharbashini and Sarojini) and 2 brothers(Subodh and Sadhan). His parents were ardent Brahmo Samajists.

Prakash Chandra was a descendant of the family of Maharaja Pradapaditya, the rebel Hindu king of Jessore, but did not inherit much wealth from his ancestors. He earned a moderate salary for most part of Roy's childhood, but he and Aghorkamini supported the education and upbringing of both their own children and a number of other poor children, mostly orphans.

Roy left Patna in June 1901 to study at the Medical College and Hospital, Kolkata. While at medical school, he came upon an inscription which read, "Whatever thy hands findeth to do, do it with thy might." These words became a lifelong source of inspiration for him.

Intending to enroll at St Bartholomew's Hospital to complete further studies in medicine, Roy left for Britain in February 1909 with ₹1,200. The then dean of St. Bartholomew's Hospital was reluctant to accept an Asian student and rejected his application. Roy submitted several additional applications until the dean, after 30 admission requests, admitted him.

== Career ==
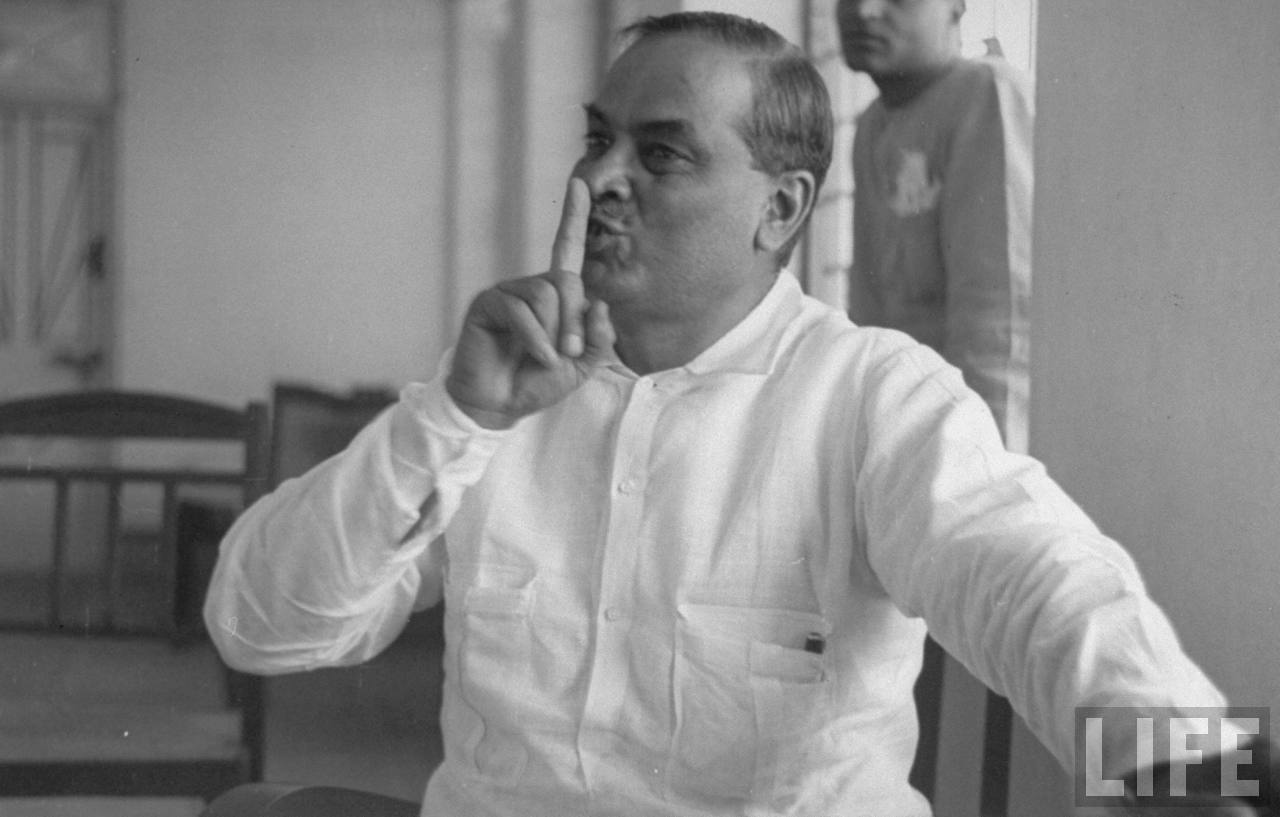
Roy in 1943

Upon returning to India, Roy joined the Provincial Health Service. In addition to a private practice, he served as a nurse when necessary. He taught at the Medical College and Hospital, Kolkata and later at the Campbell Medical School (now NRS Medical College) and the Carmichael Medical College (now R. G. Kar Medical College). He served as the first president of Cardiological Society of India from 1948 to 1950.

Roy believed that swaraj (the call to action for India's freedom) would remain a dream unless the people were healthy and strong in mind and body. He made contributions to the organisation of medical education. He played an important role in the establishment of the Jadavpur T.B. Hospital, Chittaranjan Seva Sadan, Kamala Nehru Memorial Hospital, Victoria Institution (College), and Chittaranjan Cancer Hospital. In 1926, the Chittaranjan Seva Sadan for women and children was opened by Roy.

Roy was also Mahatma Gandhi's personal doctor and friend.

In 1925, Roy ran for elections from the Barrackpore constituency as an independent candidate for the Bengal Legislative Council and defeated the "Grand Old Man of Bengal", Surendranath Banerjee. Though an independent, he voted with the Swaraj Party (the Parliamentary wing of the Congress party in the 1920s). As early as 1925, Roy tabled a resolution recommending a study of the causes of pollution in Hooghly and suggested measures to prevent pollution in the future.

Roy was elected to the All India Congress Committee in 1928. Roy conducted Civil Disobedience in Bengal in 1929 and prompted Pandit Motilal Nehru to nominate him as a member of the Congress Working Committee (CWC) in 1930. The CWC was declared an unlawful assembly and Roy along with other members of the committee were arrested on 26 August 1930 and detained at Alipore Central Jail.

During the Dandi March in 1931, many members of the Calcutta Corporation were imprisoned. Congress requested Roy to remain out of prison and discharge the duties of the Corporation. He served as the Alderman of the Corporation from 1930 to 1931 and as the Mayor of Calcutta from 1931 to 1933. Under him, the Corporation expanded schemes for free education, free medical aid, improved roads and lighting, and water supply. He set up a framework for dispensing grant-in-aid to hospitals and charitable dispensaries.

In 1942, Rangoon fell to the Japanese bombing and caused an exodus from Calcutta fearing a Japanese invasion. Roy, then serving as the Vice-Chancellor of the University of Calcutta, acquired air-raid shelters for schools and college students to have their classes in, and provided relief for students, teachers and employees alike.

== Chief Minister of West Bengal ==
Dr. Bidhan Chandra Roy with his first Cabinet, January 1948

The Congress Party proposed Roy's name for Premier of West Bengal. Although Roy sought to continue with his profession, he accepted the position and took office on 23 January 1948 upon Gandhi's advice. Bengal at the time had been torn by communal violence, shortage of food, unemployment and a large flow of refugees in the wake of the creation of East Pakistan. In an address to the people of West Bengal, Roy said:

We have the ability and if, with faith in our future, we exert ourselves with determination, nothing, I am sure, no obstacles, however formidable or insurmountable they may appear at present, can stop our progress... (if we) all work unitedly, keeping our vision clear and with a firm grasp of our problems.

On 26 January 1950, Roy took oath as the first Chief Minister of West Bengal in Independent India. Under his leadership, the Congress party won the legislative assembly elections in West Bengal in 1952 and 1957.

The 22-member Sarkar Committee, headed by industrialist Nalini Ranjan Sarkar, recommended the formation of technical institutions for higher education in India. Roy successfully petitioned then Prime Minister Jawaharlal Nehru to setup the first institute in West Bengal, on the grounds that the state had the highest concentration of industries at that time. The Indian Institute of Technology Kharagpur was thus established in May 1950, with Roy serving as the first chairman of the board of Governors.

He was credited for the development of cities like Bidhannagar, Kalyani, and Durgapur, which were crucial for the growth of West Bengal's economy at a time when it was ravaged by the ill consequences of partition.

== Death ==
Bidhan Chandra Roy died on 1 July 1962, coincidentally on his 80th birthday. His house was later converted into a nursing home named after his mother, Aghorkamini Devi. He had also constituted a trust for his properties at Patna to carry out social service, with eminent nationalist Ganga Sharan Singh (Sinha) being its first trustee.

== Legacy ==
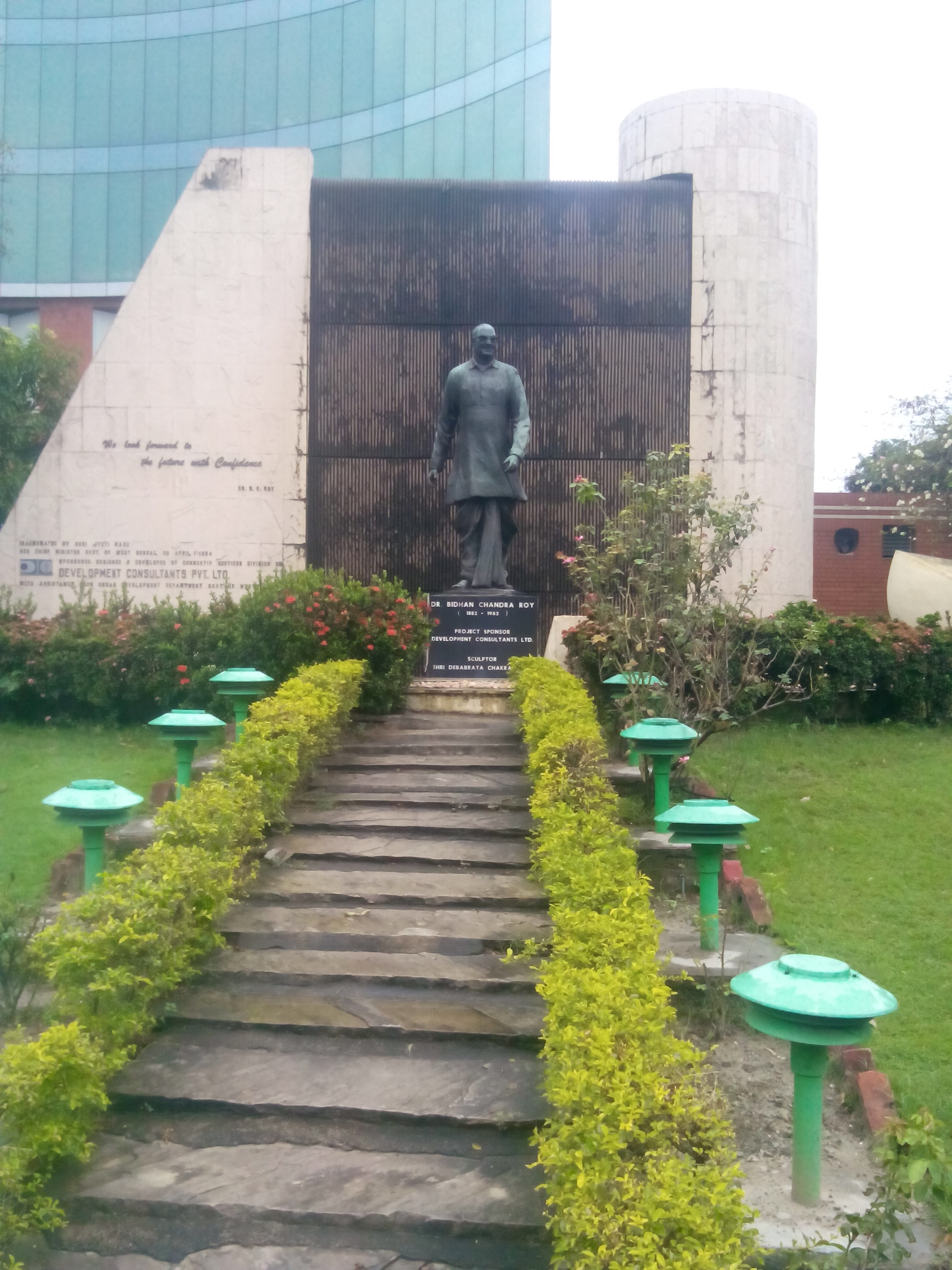
Bidhan Chandra Roy statue in Salt Lake City

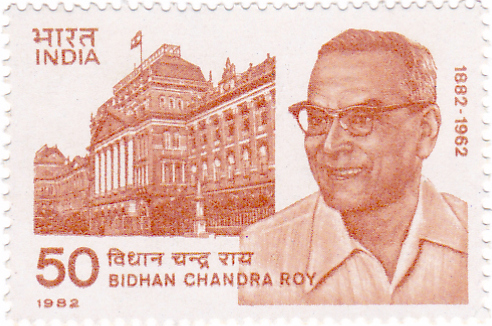
A commemorative post stamp of Dr. Roy, published by India Post.

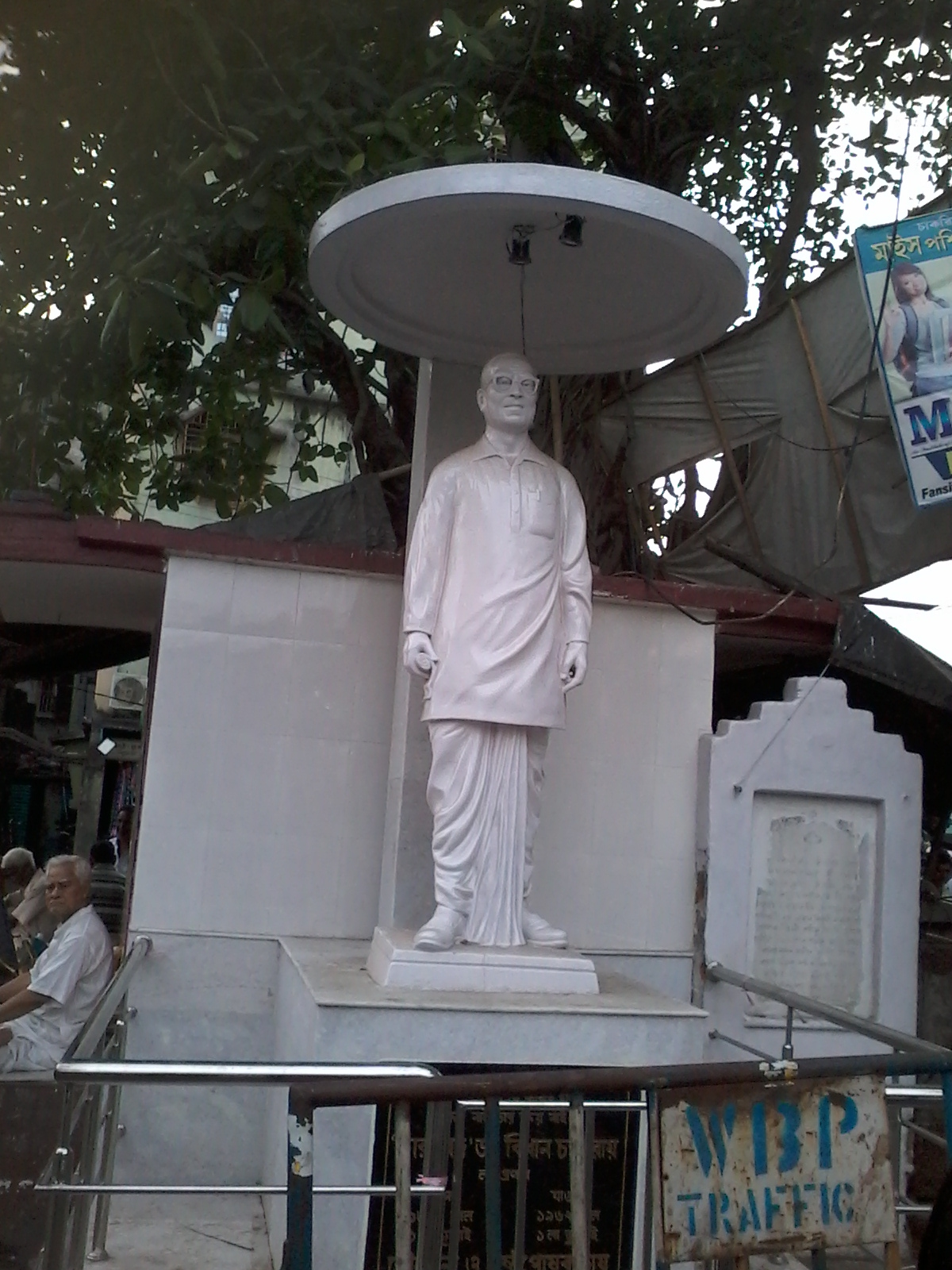
Statue of Dr. B. C. Roy in Howrah city

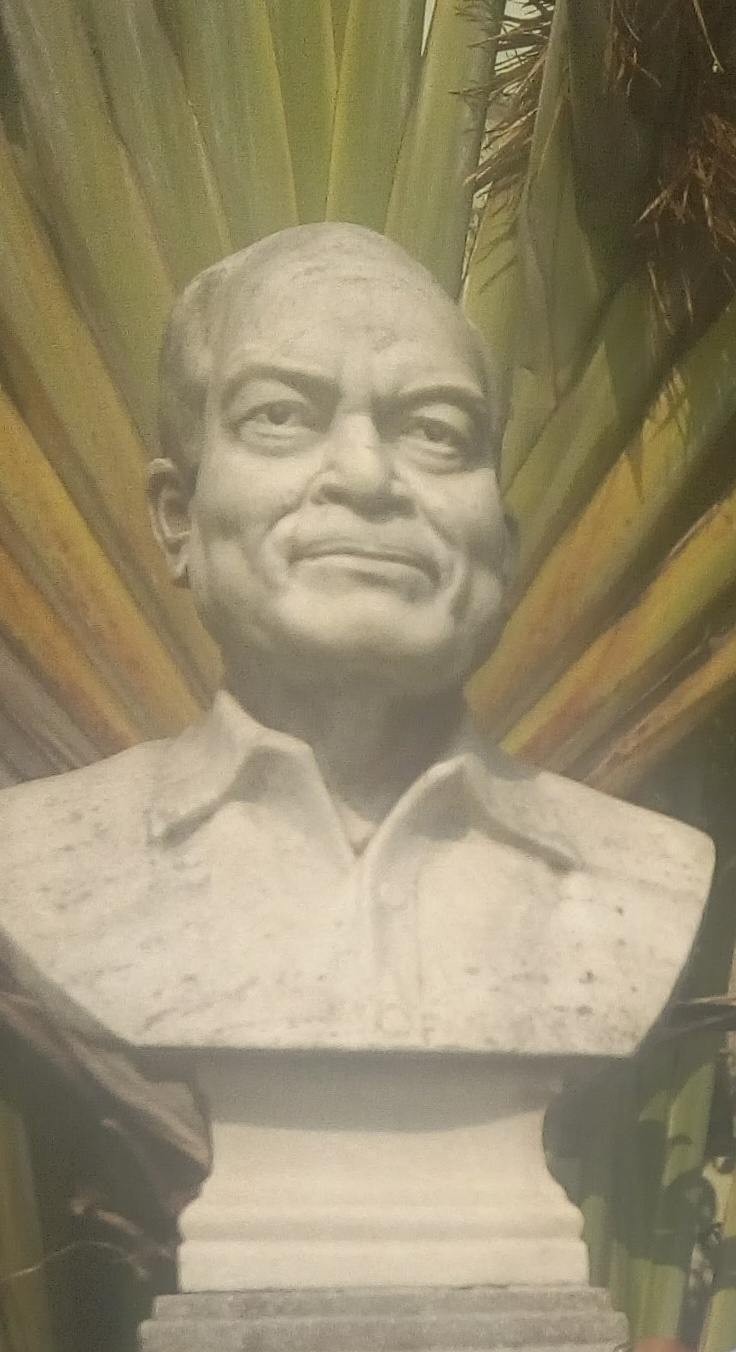
Bust of Roy at Bidhan Shishu Udyan in Ultadanga

The Indian Government honoured Roy with the Bharat Ratna on 4 February 1961.

The B.C. Roy National Award was instituted in 1962 in his memory and has been awarded annually since 1976. The award recognises excellent contributions in the areas of medicine, politics, science, philosophy, literature and arts. The Dr. B. C. Roy Memorial Library and Reading Room for Children in the Children's Book Trust, New Delhi, was opened in 1967. Today, his private papers are part of the Archives at the Nehru Memorial Museum & Library, at Teen Murti House, Delhi.

India celebrates National Doctors' Day on 1 July every year to honour his birthday and deathday.

=== In Bollywood ===
In the superhit movie Bawarchi, Rajesh Khanna who played the role of protagonist Raghu, is talented traditional Indian cook who is surprisingly a philosopher, singer, composer, dance instructor and mathematician. In the movie, Raghu speaks to have attained these skills and traits through working with different Indian public figures including Bidhan Chandra Roy to name a few.

== See also ==
- B.C. Roy Trophy
- Bidhannagar

Political offices
Preceded by Prafulla Chandra Ghosh	Chief Minister of West Bengal; 1948–1962	Succeeded by President's Rule
