= Gautam Kaul (film critic) =

Indian film critic

- Died: 18 September 2024 (aged 83); New Delhi, India
- Occupations: Film critic, film historian, musicologist, Indian Police Service officer
- Awards: National Film Award for Best Film Critic (1991)

Gautam Kaul (died 18 September 2024) was a noted Indian film critic and film historian. He was awarded the National Film Award for Best Film Critic in 1991.

Kaul also served on several film juries, including the jury for the 31st National Film Awards in 1984. In 2000, he was part of the 12-member jury responsible for recommending films for the Indian Panorama section of the International Film Festival of India (IFFI).

Kaul served as president of the Federation of Film Societies of India (FFSI) from 2014 to 2016. The FFSI is considered the central body for film appreciation and education in India.

He also made significant contributions to the field of musicology.

Kaul was also an Indian Police Service officer of the 1965 batch, serving as the Director General of the Indo-Tibetan Border Police (ITBP) from 1998 until his retirement in 2001.

== Film critic ==
Kaul was a columnist for prominent publications including Filmfare, Screen, and The Hindu. In addition to these, he wrote frequently for other film periodicals such as the Journal of Indian Cinema.

== Books ==
- Indian Film Culture: Indian Cinema
- Cinema and the Indian Freedom Struggle - 1998, Sterling Publishers, New Delhi.
- Prem Adib: The Lost Hero of the '40s – draft book

== Personal ==
Kaul was the son of renowned botanist the late Kailash Nath Kaul and late Sheila Kaul, an Indian National Congress leader and former Union minister.

== Death ==
Kaul died on September 18, 2024, after a prolonged illness. He was 83.
