= National Botanical Research Institute =

Indian taxonomy and biology research facility

Coordinates: 26°51′20.08″N 80°57′8.69″E

The National Botanical Research Institute (NBRI) is a research institute of the Council of Scientific and Industrial Research (CSIR) located in Lucknow, Uttar Pradesh, India. It is engaged in the field of taxonomy and modern biology. Here’s a concise 100‑word overview of the National Botanical Research Institute (NBRI), framed from its leadership down to its ownership:

---

The National Botanical Research Institute (NBRI), located in Lucknow, is a premier plant science institute under the Council of Scientific and Industrial Research (CSIR), Ministry of Science and Technology, Government of India. The institute is led by a Director, who oversees scientific programs, administration, and innovation. Above the Director, CSIR is governed by the President of CSIR Society and chaired by the Prime Minister of India, reflecting its national importance. Ultimately, NBRI is owned and funded by the Government of India, serving as a public institution dedicated to botanical research, biodiversity conservation, and applied plant sciences.

== History ==
Originally conceptualised and set up as the National Botanic Gardens (NBG) by Kailas Nath Kaul on behalf of the Government of Uttar Pradesh, it was taken over by the CSIR in 1953. Triloki Nath Khoshoo joined in 1964 as the Assistant Director, shortly afterwards becoming the Director. Initially engaged in research work in the classical botanical disciplines, the NBG went on laying an increasing emphasis in keeping with the national needs and priorities in the field of plant sciences, on its applied and developmental research activities. Due to the untiring efforts of Khoshoo, the institute rose to the stature of being the National Botanical Research Institute in 1978, reflecting the correct nature and extent of its aims and objectives, functions and research and development activities. Sikandar Bagh is a famous and historic pleasure garden, located in the grounds of the Institute.

== Achievements ==
- NBRI developed a new variety of bougainvillea, named Los Banos Variegata-Jayanthi.
- In a move to fight against whiteflies National Botanical Research Institute (NBRI) Lucknow has developed a pest resistant variety of cotton.
- A group of innovators developed first indigenous transgenic cotton variety expressing bt protein.

== South Africa ==
National Botanical Research Institute (NBRI) is also the state botanical research institute of South Africa.
