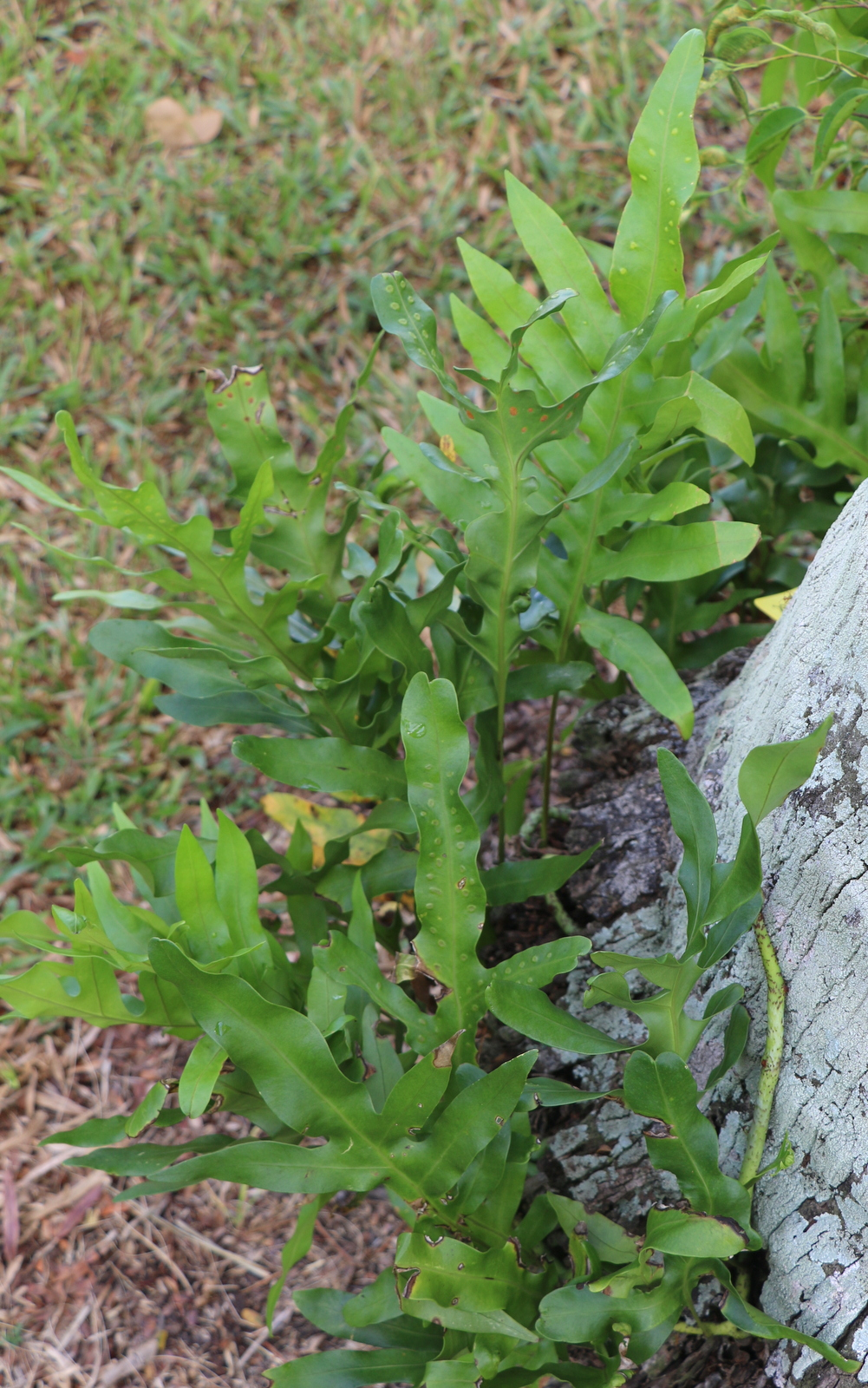
- Darwin, Australia

Scientific classification
- Kingdom: Plantae
- Clade: Tracheophytes
- Division: Polypodiophyta
- Class: Polypodiopsida
- Order: Polypodiales
- Suborder: Polypodiineae
- Family: Polypodiaceae
- Genus: Microsorum
- Species: M. grossum

Binomial name
- Microsorum grossum (Langsd. & Fisch.) S.B.Andrews

Synonyms
- Phymatosorus grossus

= Microsorum grossum =

Species of fern

Microsorum grossum is a fern in the family Polypodiaceae, found in tropical areas of Australia and Oceania.

It was introduced in Hawaii in the late 1910s and has subsequently naturalized rapidly. It is found on all main islands. Its Hawaiian name lauaʻe is thought to have originally referred to the native fern Microsorum spectrum.

== Uses ==
When crushed, the fern issues a scent similar to maile. Sometimes, pieces of the fern are interlaced in leis made of strung-up keys (individual drupes) of the pandanus fruit. It is also one of the plants used for scenting kapa fabric.

== Folklore ==
Expanses of the fern famously grows in Makana on Kauaʻi, and is commemorated in song.
