= Kailas Nath Kaul =

Indian scientist

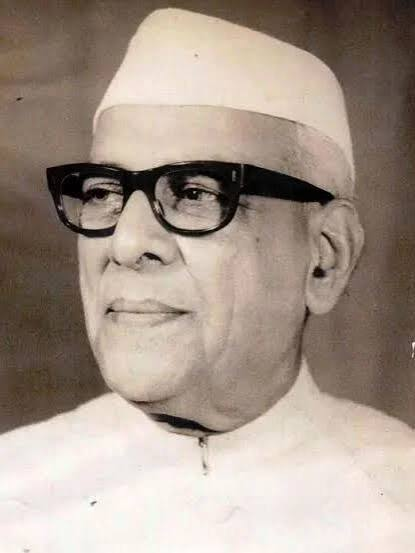
- Born: 1905
- Died: 1983 (aged 77–78)
- Known for: Founding director of the National Botanical Research Institute (NBRI)
- Spouse: Sheila Kaul
- Relatives: Kamala Nehru (sister)
- Awards: Padma Bhushan, Indian civilian honour (1977)
- Scientific career
- Fields: Botany, Agricultural science, Natural resource management, Horticulture
- Institutions: National Botanical Research Institute, India; Royal Botanic Gardens, Kew, United Kingdom; Natural History Museum, London, United Kingdom; University of Cambridge, United Kingdom; Lucknow University, India; Kanpur University, India; Chandra Shekhar Azad University of Agriculture and Technology, India; University of Kashmir, India; Central Drug Research Institute, India

Kailas Nath Kaul (1905–1983) was an Indian botanist, naturalist, agricultural scientist, horticulturist, herbalist, plant collector and herpetologist, and a world authority on Arecaceae. He founded India's National Botanical Research Institute and was instrumental in organizing the country's modern scientific infrastructure. He is regarded as a vital influence behind his niece Indira Gandhi's proactive role in environmental protection by means of extensive legislative and policy interventions.

== Notable achievements ==
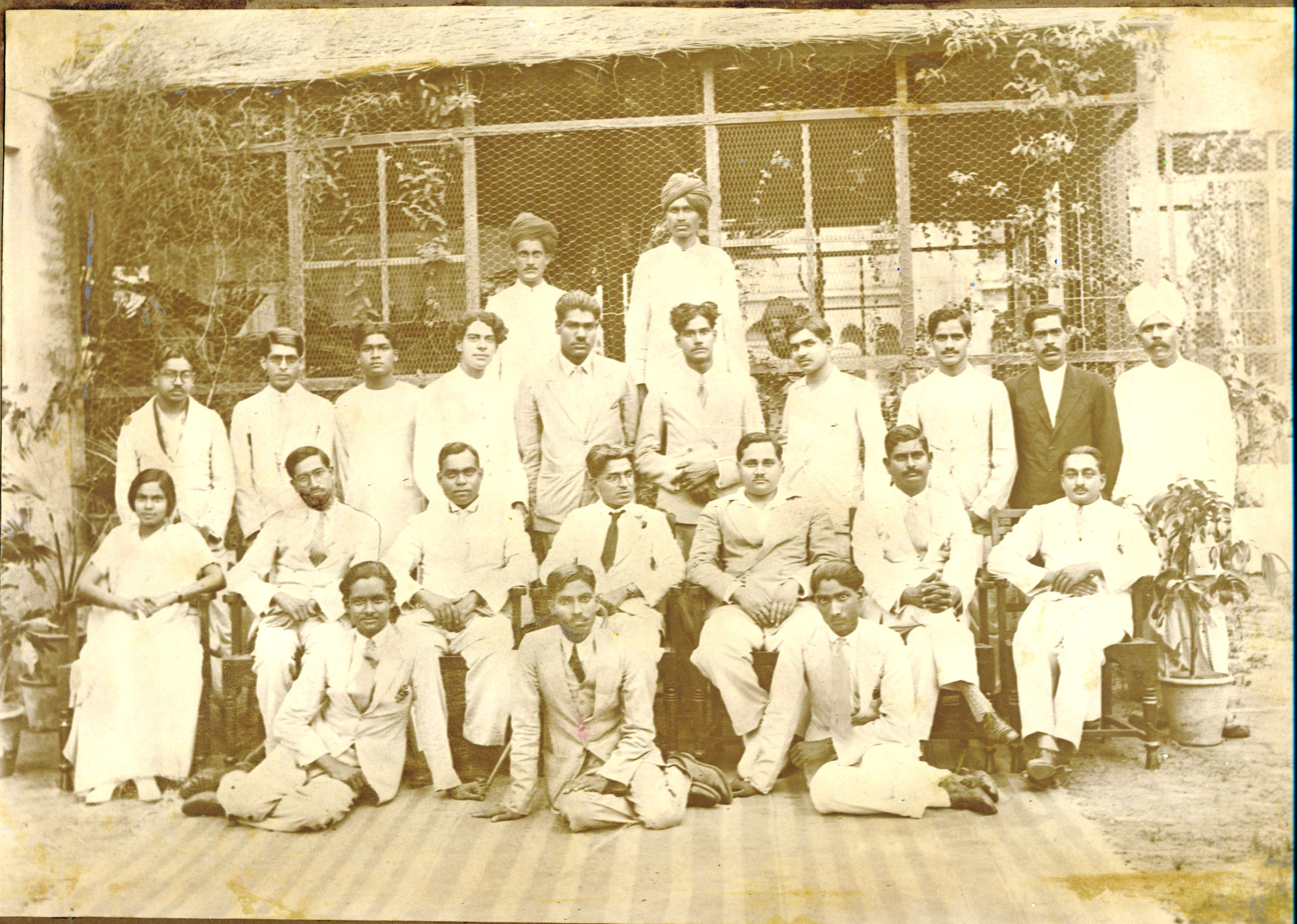
Kaul at the University of Lucknow in 1928 (standing, fourth from left)

Kaul earned a M.Sc. in botany degree from the University of Lucknow in 1928, and then he completed advanced research and studies at institutions including the Royal Botanic Gardens, Kew and Cambridge University.

Having served as the first Indian scientist at the Royal Botanic Gardens, Kew, and worked with the Natural History Museum, London, and several British universities including the University of Cambridge, Professor Kaul established the National Botanical Research Institute (formerly, the National Botanic Gardens of India), at Lucknow in 1948. He directed the Institute until 1965, during which time it remained one of the world's five best botanical gardens, along with those at Kew (UK), Bogor (Indonesia), Paris (France) and New York (USA). From 1953 until 1965, Kaul surveyed botanically the whole of India, from the Karakoram mountains in the north to Kanyakumari at the southern tip of the country, and from the North East Frontier Agency in the east to the Rann of Kutch in the west. In the same period, he contributed to the development of the botanical gardens at Peradeniya (Sri Lanka), Singapore, Bogor (Indonesia), Bangkok (Thailand), Hong Kong, Tokyo (Japan), and Manila (Philippines). He represented India at the International Botanical Congresses at Paris (1954), Montreal (1959), and Edinburgh (1964). In 1968, he was elected as the President of the Palaeobotanical Society, India. In 1975, he was appointed the first Vice Chancellor of the Chandra Shekhar Azad University of Agriculture and Technology, Kanpur, India.

Kaul's 1929 work on the medicinal plant Artemisia brevifolia in Kashmir caused yields of Santonin, an anthelminthic derived from the plant, to increase six times. This made the production of Santonin economically viable in India.

In 1947, Kaul discovered fresh water aquifers in the princely state of Jodhpur in the Thar Desert, India, mainly by studying the spatial patterns of vegetation and depths of wells in the region. He used a small aircraft owned by Maharaja Umaid Singh to conduct aerial surveys for this purpose. He then prepared a desert reclamation scheme to solve the enigma of Jodhpur's water shortage. In 1949–50, he also organized the Underground Water Board for Rajasthan at Jaipur.

In 1969, Kaul, a native of Kashmir, was appointed Director for Gardens, Parks and Floriculture in the Indian state of Jammu and Kashmir. He worked for several years on the conservation and management of floral biodiversity and the rejuvenation of the Mogul-era gardens in the state, and as the advisor to the Chief Minister on the subject.

Kaul was responsible for the reclamation of several thousand acres of alkaline land in the Indian state of Uttar Pradesh. His work has been named The Banthra Formula after Banthra, the place where it was initiated in 1953. The project involved organic amendments and biological interventions such as the cultivation of alkali-tolerant herbaceous, shrub and tree species. Its decentralized, community-based development approach benefited subsistence and small-scale commercial farmers through the intensification and diversification of biomass production for food, fuel, fodder, fertilizers, medicines, timber, animal husbandry, aquaculture, soil amelioration, and bioaesthetics.

As the architect of the Vigyan Mandir or School of Science Scheme (1948), which was later adopted by the Government of India, Kaul encouraged science education and research across the country. He also worked for the promotion of traditional sculpture, painting, and applied arts, and was elected as the President of the Lalit Kala Akademi of Uttar Pradesh in 1965.

== Contribution to the Indian freedom movement ==
Kaul joined the Indian freedom movement led by Gandhi in 1930, when he was sent by the All India Congress Committee to assist Khan Abdul Ghaffar Khan in organising rural uplift work in the Kohat, Bannu and Peshawar districts. He also worked in villages adjoining Delhi under the guidance of Asaf Ali during the Civil Disobedience Movement. In 1931, Kaul was arrested and charged with planting the flag of Independence and was sentenced to six months in jail. While in jail, he ran a school for 'C Class' prisoners. His thesis on alkaline (usar) soils was confiscated by the British Government for his active participation in the Indian Freedom Movement. Kaul also worked against untouchability and gave free education to Dalit children in Lucknow. His mother Rajpati Kaul and his sister Kamala Nehru were among the first few women to have participated in the Indian freedom movement.

Colonel Richard Meinertzhagen, on Salim Ali's choice of Kailas Nath Kaul as the botanical expert for a 1937 expedition to Afghanistan, remarked, "He [Kaul] is a young man, nice mannered and intelligent, but I am a little doubtful whether I can stomach two seditionists for three months all day and every day. Salim is a rank seditionist and communist; so is Kaul..."

== Family and friends ==
Rajpati and Jawahar Mull Atal-Kaul were Kaul's parents, and Kamala Nehru, Chand Bahadur Kaul, and Swaroop Kathju were his siblings. He was married to Sheila Kaul, an educationist, social worker, and politician. Gautam Kaul, Deepa Kaul, and Vikram Kaul are their children.

Kaul's paternal great-grandfather, Moti Lal Atal (originally Thullal in Kashmiri), was dewan of the princely state of Jaipur, his brother-in-law, Jawaharlal Nehru ('Jawahar Bhai'), was the first prime minister of independent India, and his niece, Indira Priyadarshini Gandhi ('Indu'), was the third prime minister of India. Having spent much time with him in the Himalayas, Indira became deeply influenced by Kaul's passion for nature. Kaul was introduced to Kumaon and Garhwal’s botanical diversity by Nirmal Chandra Chaturvedi, a prominent social worker from Lucknow.

Among Kaul's natural scientist friends were Frank Hawking, a British biologist and physician and Stephen Hawking's father; Sir Edward James Salisbury, a British botanist and ecologist; Ronald Melville, a British botanist; Arthur John Cronquist, an American botanist; Birbal Sahni, an Indian palaeobotanist; G.C. Mitra, an Indian botanist; Alexandr Innokentevich Tolmatchew, a Soviet botanist; Kiril Bratanov, a Bulgarian biologist; Ronald Pearson Tripp, a British palaeontologist; and René Dumont, a French agronomist. His other friends included Todor Zhivkov, former President of Bulgaria; Alfred Jules Ayer, a British philosopher, Herbert V. Günther, a German philosopher and linguist, and Margaret Mee, a British botanical artist.

== Awards and honours ==
- Padma Bhushan, Indian civilian honour (1977)
- K.N. Kaul Institute of Life Sciences, India
- K.N. Kaul Block, National Botanical Research Institute, India
- Kaulinia, a genus of ferns named in his honour.
