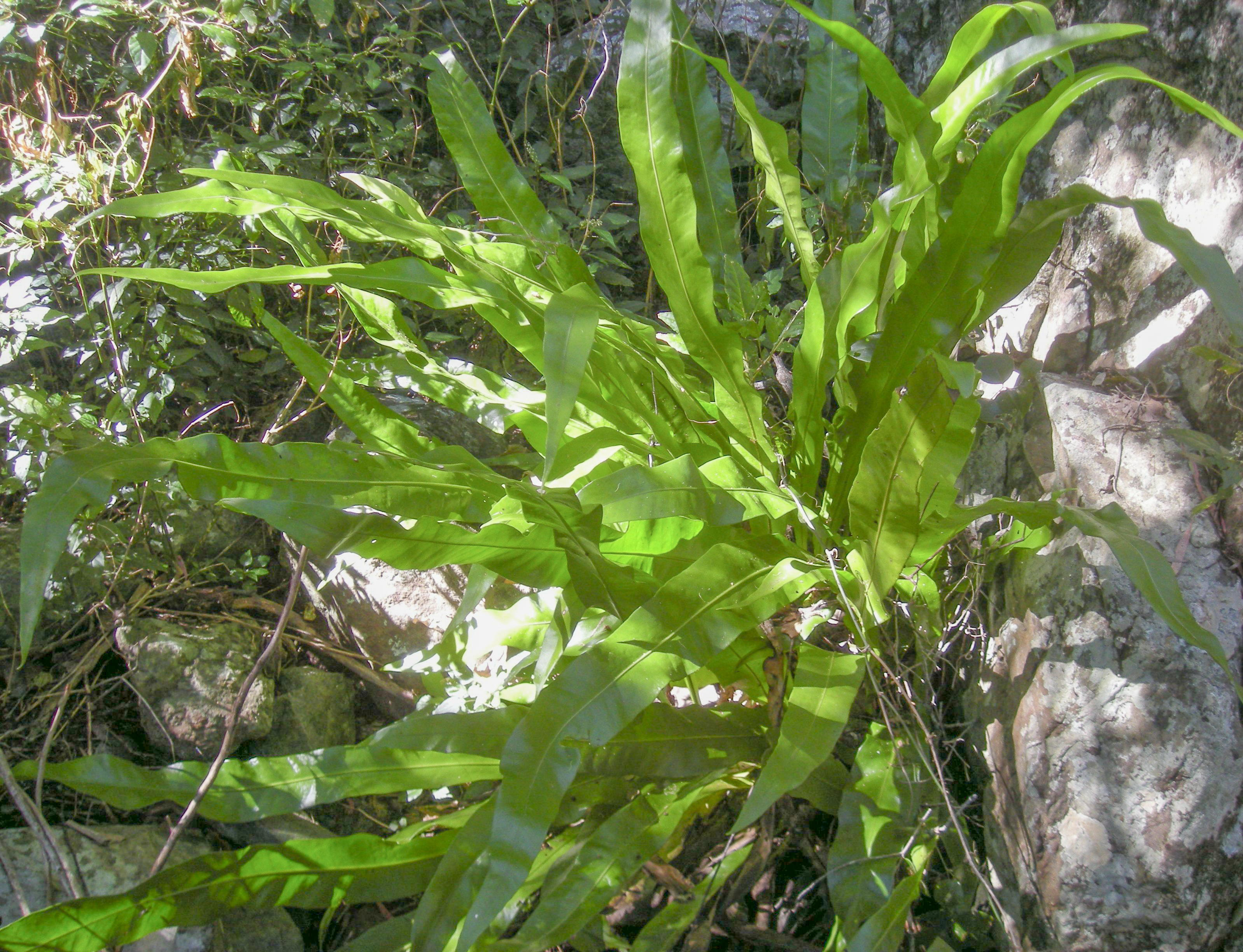
- Microsorum punctatum

Scientific classification
- Kingdom: Plantae
- Clade: Embryophytes
- Clade: Tracheophytes
- Division: Polypodiophyta
- Class: Polypodiopsida
- Order: Polypodiales
- Suborder: Polypodiineae
- Family: Polypodiaceae
- Subfamily: Microsoroideae
- Genus: Microsorum; Link

Species
- See text.

Synonyms
- Campylogramma Alderw.; Colysis C. Presl; Diblemma J.Sm.; Dendroconche Copel.; Kaulinia B.K. Nayar; Microsorium Link; Myrmecophila Christ ex T.Nakai; Onychium Reinw.; Phymatosorus Pic.Serm.

= Microsorum =

Genus of ferns

Microsorum is a genus of tropical ferns in the family Polypodiaceae, subfamily Microsoroideae, according to the Pteridophyte Phylogeny Group classification of 2016 (PPG I). Like most ferns, they grow from rhizomes, rather than roots. The genus includes some species that are lithophytic rheophytes.

== Taxonomy ==
The genus Phymatosorus is included in Microsorum in the Pteridophyte Phylogeny Group classification of 2016 (PPG I). As of February 2019, both the Checklist of Ferns and Lycophytes of the World and Plants of the World Online kept Phymatosorus separate. A 2019 molecular phylogenetic study of the subfamily Microsoroideae did not distinguish Phymatosorus from Microsorum, and suggested that the genus as there circumscribed was sister to Leptochilus, together forming one of the three main clades in the subfamily:

- Microsoroideae
  - - - Lepisorus s.l. (7 genera in the PPG I system)
      - - Microsorum
        - Leptochilus
    - lecanopteroid genera (4 genera)
  - Goniophlebium

=== Species ===
As of February 2020, the Checklist of Ferns and Lycophytes of the World recognized the following species, either in Microsorum or in Phymatosorus with a synonym in Microsorum (marked "[P]" in the list).

- Microsorum aichmophyllum (Alston) Fraser-Jenk.
- Microsorum alatum (Brack.) Copel. [P]
- Microsorum aurantiacum Noot.
- Microsorum australiense (Bailey) Bostock
- Microsorum baithoense V.N.Tu
- Microsorum biseriatum (Bosman) Noot. [P]
- Microsorum cinctum Bosman
- Microsorum commutatum (Blume) Copel. [P]
- Microsorum congregatifolium (Alderw.) Holttum
- Microsorum cromwellii (Rosenst.) Copel. [P]
- Microsorum cuspidatum (D. Don) Tagawa [P]
- Microsorum egregium (Brause) Bosman
- Microsorum glossophyllum (Copel.) Copel.
- Microsorum griseorhizoma Gilli
- Microsorum grossum (Langsd. & Fisch.) S. B. Andrews [P]
- Microsorum hainanense Noot. [P]
- Microsorum heterocarpum (Blume) Ching
- Microsorum heterolobum (C.Chr.) Copel.
- Microsorum krayanense M.Kato, Darnaedi & K.Iwats.
- Microsorum longissimum J.Sm. ex Fée
- Microsorum maximum (Brack.) Copel.
- Microsorum membranifolium (R. Br.) Ching [P]
- Microsorum monstrosum (Copel.) Copel.
- Microsorum musifolium (Blume) Copel.
- Microsorum papuanum (Baker) Parris [P]
- Microsorum parksii (Copel.) Copel. [P]
- Microsorum pentaphyllum (Baker) Copel.
- Microsorum piliferum V.N.Tu
- Microsorum pitcairnense Copel.
- Microsorum punctatum (L.) Copel.
- Microsorum rampans (Baker) Parris
- Microsorum rubidum (Kunze) Copel. [P]
- Microsorum samarense (J.Sm.) Bosman
- Microsorum sarawakense (Baker) Holttum
- Microsorum scolopendria (Burm. fil.) Copel. [P]
- Microsorum siamense Boonkerd
- Microsorum sibomense (Rosenst.) Copel.
- Microsorum sopuense Bosman
- Microsorum spectrum (Kaulf.) Copel.
- Microsorum steerei (Harr.) Ching
- Microsorum submarginale M.Kato, Darnaedi & K.Iwats.
- Microsorum thailandicum Boonkerd & Noot.
- Microsorum × tohieaense J.H.Nitta
- Microsorum whiteheadii A.R.Sm. & Hoshiz.

Species placed elsewhere by the Checklist of Ferns and Lycophytes of the World include:

- Microsorum lastii (Baker) Tardieu = Bosmania lastii
- Microsorum latilobatum Hennipman & Hett. = Dendroconche latilobata
- Microsorum leandrianum Tardieu = Bosmania leandriana
- Microsorum linguiforme Copel. = Dendroconche linguiforme
- Microsorum membranaceum (D.Don) Ching = Bosmania membranacea
- Microsorum pappei (Mett.) Tardieu = Neolepisorus pappei
- Microsorum varians (Mett.) Hennipman & Hett. = Dendroconche varians
- Microsorum zippelii Ching = Neolepisorus zippelii

== Bibliography ==
- D.J. Mabberley. 2008. Mabberley's plant-book: a portable dictionary of plants, their classification and uses, third edition, revised, Cambridge University Press, ISBN 0-521-82071-5, ISBN 978-0-521-82071-4, 1021 pages
