= Kamala Nehru =

Indian independence activist and wife of Jawaharlal Nehru (1899-1936)

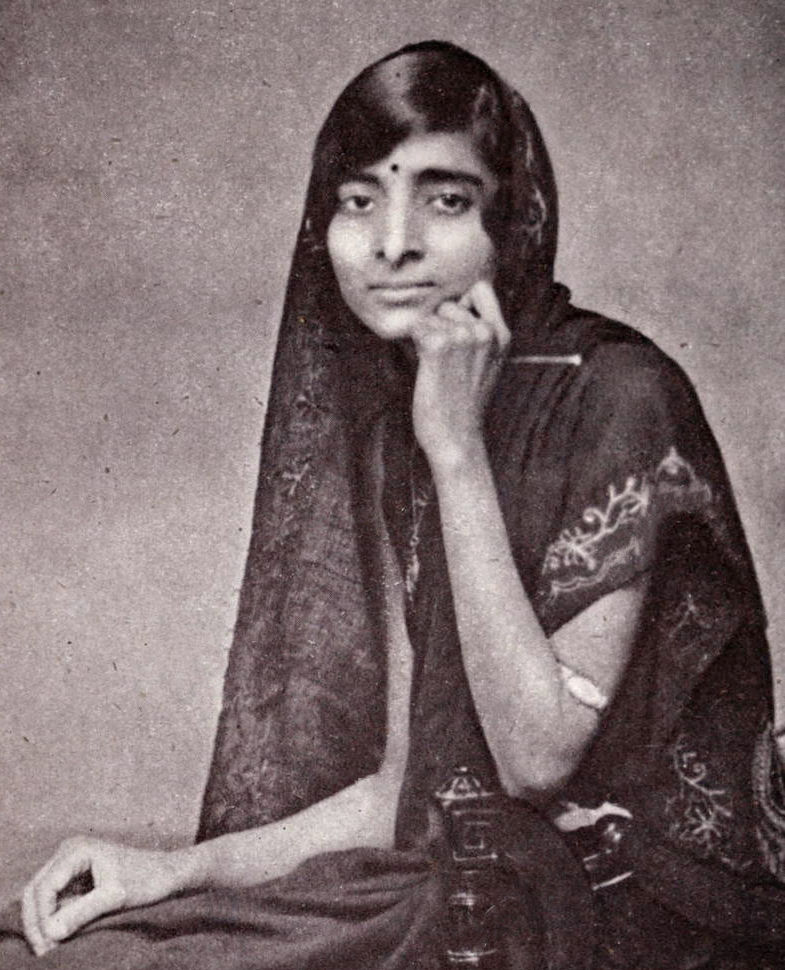
- Undated photograph
- Born: Kamala Kaul; 1 August 1899; Delhi, British India
- Died: 28 February 1936 (aged 36); Lausanne, Switzerland
- Occupation: Indian independence activist
- Spouse: Jawaharlal Nehru (m. 1916)
- Children: Indira Gandhi
- Family: Nehru–Gandhi family

Kamala Nehru (Hindi: [kəmlɑː ˈneːɦɾuː]; née Kaul; 1 August 1899 – 28 February 1936) was an Indian independence activist and the wife of Jawaharlal Nehru, the first prime minister of India. Their daughter Indira Gandhi would go on to become the first and only woman to serve as prime minister of India.

== Early life and marriage ==
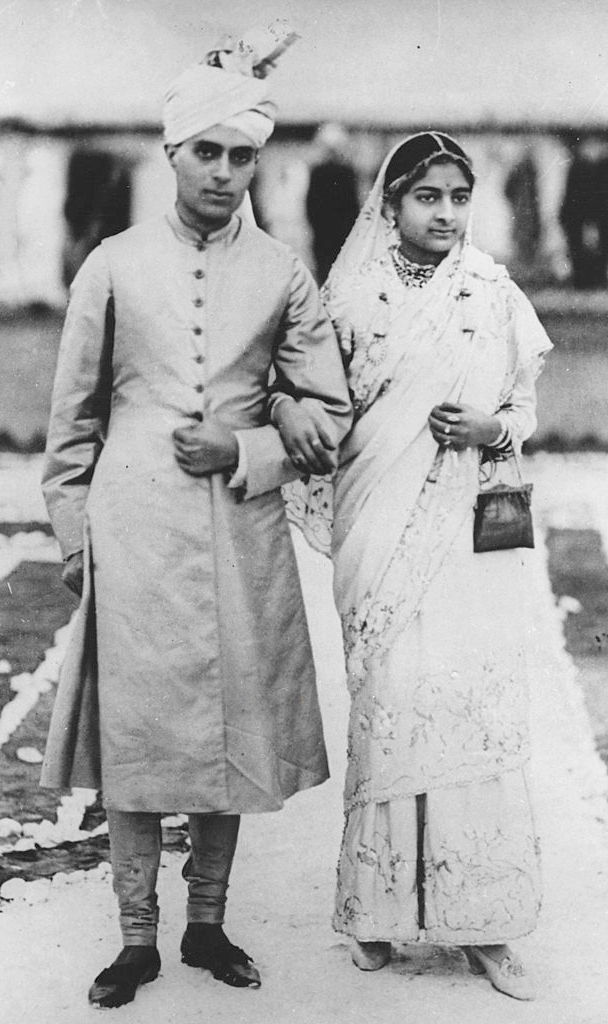
Jawaharlal and Kamala Nehru on their wedding day, 8 February 1916

Kamala Kaul was born to a middle-class Kashmiri Pandit family on 1 August 1899 in Delhi. She was the eldest child of Jawahrmul and Rajpati Kaul; her siblings were Chand Bahadur Kaul, Kailas Nath Kaul and Swaroop Kathju. Her family observed the purdah practice among non-Kashmiri Pandits.

At the age of 16, Kaul had an arranged marriage to Jawaharlal Nehru, who was ten years her senior, on 8 February 1916. Her husband went to a trip in the Himalayas shortly after their marriage. In his autobiography, Jawaharlal Nehru, referring to his wife, stated, "I almost overlooked her." Nehru gave birth to a girl in November 1917, Indira Priyadarshini, who later succeeded her father as prime minister and head of the Congress party.

== Contribution to the Indian Independence Movement ==
Kamala was so involved with the Nehru's in the national movement that she emerged into the forefront. In the Non-Cooperation movement of 1921, she organized groups of women in Allahabad and picketed shops selling foreign cloth and liquor. When her husband was arrested to prevent him from delivering a "seditious" public speech, she decided to go in his place and read it out to a large crowd of onlookers (filled with her supporters). The colonial authorities soon realized the threat that Kamala Nehru posed to them and how popular she had become with women's groups all over India. She was arrested on two additional occasions for her involvement in Independence struggle activities, along with Sarojini Naidu, Kamala Nehru's mother, and many other women of the Indian independence struggle. During this period she started a dispensary in her house Swaraj Bhavan, converting few rooms into a Congress Dispensary to treat wounded activists, their families, and other residents of Allahabad(now Prayagraj). After her death, Mahatma Gandhi with the help of other prominent leaders converted this dispensary into a proper hospital known as Kamla Nehru Memorial Hospital in her memory.

Kamala Nehru spent some time at Gandhi's ashram with Kasturba Gandhi where she built a close friendship with Prabhavati Devi – the wife of independence activist Jayaprakash Narayan.

== Death ==
Kamala Nehru died from tuberculosis in Lausanne, Switzerland, on 28 February 1936, with her daughter and mother-in-law by her side. During her last few years, Kamala Nehru was frequently ill and taken to a sanatorium in Switzerland for treatment, though she returned to India as she got well. In early 1935, as Kamala Nehru's health again deteriorated, she was taken to Badenweiler in Germany by Subhash Chandra Bose and admitted to a sanatorium for treatment. Her husband Jawaharlal Nehru was in prison in India at that time. As her health worsened, Jawaharlal Nehru was released from prison and rushed to Germany in October 1935. While Nehru's health improved initially, it started to deteriorate again in 1936, and she died on 28 February. In the prologue to his autobiography, in a chapter added after Kamala's death, Jawaharlal Nehru recounts that he was devastated and remained in mourning for months.

== Legacy ==
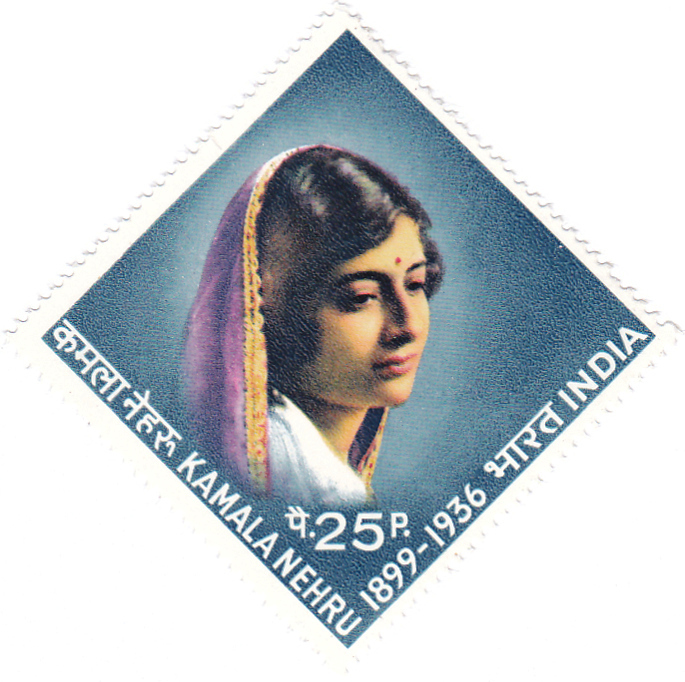
Nehru on a 1974 stamp of India

A number of institutions in India, and a road in Pakistan, have been named in Kamala Nehru's honor, including:

=== India ===
- Kamla Nehru Park in Mumbai
- Kamala Nehru health and wellness center in Dindigul
- Kamla Nehru Balika High School in Patna
- Kamala Nehru College at Delhi University
- Kamala Nehru College in Korba
- Kamla Nehru College for Women, Jodhpur in Jodhpur
- Kamala Nehru Degree Evening College in Bangalore
- Kamla Nehru Institute of Physical and Social Science Sultanpur in Sultanpur
- Kamla Nehru Memorial Hospital in Allahabad
- Kamala Nehru Polytechnic in Hyderabad
- Kamala Nehru Park in Pune
- Kamla Nehru Prani Sangrahalay in Indore
- Kamala Nehru Memorial Vocational Higher Secondary School Vatanappally in Kerala
- Kamala Nehru Women's College in Bhubaneswar
- Shaskiya Kamla Nehru Girls Higher Secondary School in Bhopal
- Kamal Nehru Government Girl's High School in Yanam (Puducherry)
- Kamala Nehru Park in Raigarh, Chhattisgarh
- Kamala Nehru Nagar in Ghaziabad
- Kamla Nehru Group of Institutions, Sultanpur, Uttar Pradesh

=== Pakistan ===
In Karachi, there is a road named after her, near the Mazar-e-Quaid-e-Azam.

=== In popular culture ===
Kamala Nehru is a 1986 Indian documentary film directed by Ashish Mukherjee. Produced by the Government of India's Films Division, it provides an overview of her life and contributions.

== Sources ==
- Jayakar, Pupul (1995). Indira Gandhi, A Biography. Penguin Books.
- Gopal, Sarvepalli (1976). Jawaharlal Nehru: A Biography, Volume 1: 1889-1947. Harvard University Press.
- Kalhan, Promila (1973). Kamala Nehru: An Intimate Biography. Vikas Publishing House. ISBN 9780706902655.
