= List of Rajya Sabha members from Bihar =

The Rajya Sabha (meaning the "Council of States") is the upper house of the Parliament of India. Bihar state elects 16 members since the 2002 biennial elections. Before, Bihar State has elected 21 seats since April 1952 and 22 seats since 1956, and 16 members after the Bihar Reorganisation Act 2000 and the creation of the new Jharkhand state on 15 November 2000. They are elected indirectly by the State Legislators of Bihar State. Members are elected for six years and 1/3 of members are retired after every two years. The number of seats allocated to the party is determined by the number of seats a party possesses during nomination and the party nominates a member to be voted on. Elections within the state legislatures are held using a Single transferable vote with proportional representation.

Members from Bihar are listed in the list of current members of the Rajya Sabha.

== Current members (2026) ==
Keys: BJP (7) JD(U) (4) RLM (1) RJD (3) INC (1)

#	Name	Party	Term Start	Term End
1	Nitin Nabin	BJP	10-Apr-2026	09-Apr-2032
2	Shivesh Kumar	BJP	10-Apr-2026	09-Apr-2032
3	Dharamshila Gupta	BJP	03-Apr-2024	02-Apr-2030
4	Bhim Singh	BJP	03-Apr-2024	02-Apr-2030
5	Manan Mishra	BJP	27-Aug-2024	07-Jul-2028
6	Satish Chandra Dubey	BJP	08-Jul-2022	07-Jul-2028
7	Shambhu Sharan Patel	BJP	08-Jul-2022	07-Jul-2028
8	Nitish Kumar	JDU	10-Apr-2026	09-Apr-2032
9	Ram Nath Thakur	JDU	10-Apr-2026	09-Apr-2032
10	Sanjay Jha	JDU	03-Apr-2024	02-Apr-2030
11	Khiru Mahto	JDU	08-Jul-2022	07-Jul-2028
12	Upendra Kushwaha	RLM	10-Apr-2020	09-Apr-2026
13	Manoj Jha	RJD	03-Apr-2024	02-Apr-2030
14	Sanjay Yadav	RJD	03-Apr-2024	02-Apr-2030
15	Faiyaz Ahmad	RJD	08-Jul-2022	07-Jul-2028
16	Akhilesh Prasad Singh	INC	03-Apr-2024	02-Apr-2030

== Chronological list of all members from Bihar ==
This is the term wise list of former Rajya Sabha members from Bihar, arranged chronologically by Last date of election of the member.
Source: Parliament of India (Rajya Sabha)

* represents members who won bye-election

Name	Party	Term start	Term end	Term	Notes
Manan Kumar Mishra	BJP	28-Aug-2024	07-Jul-2028	1	bye - resignation of Misa Bharti
Upendra Kushwaha	RLM	28-Aug-2024	09-Apr-2026	2	bye - resignation of Vivek Thakur
Dharamshila Gupta	BJP	03-Apr-2024	02-Apr-2030	1	
Bhim Singh	BJP	03-Apr-2024	02-Apr-2030	1	
Sanjay Kumar Jha	JDU	03-Apr-2024	02-Apr-2030	1	
Manoj Jha	RJD	03-Apr-2024	02-Apr-2030	2	
Sanjay Yadav	RJD	03-Apr-2024	02-Apr-2030	1	
Akhilesh Prasad Singh	INC	03-Apr-2024	02-Apr-2030	2	*
Misa Bharti	RJD	08-Jul-2022	07-Jul-2028	2	*
Faiyaz Ahmad	RJD	08-Jul-2022	07-Jul-2028	1	*
Khiru Mahto	JDU	08-Jul-2022	07-Jul-2028	1	*
Satish Chandra Dubey	BJP	08-Jul-2022	07-Jul-2028	2	*
Shambhu Sharan Patel	BJP	08-Jul-2022	07-Jul-2028	1	*
Anil Hegde	JDU	30-May-2022	02-Apr-2024	1	bye - death of Mahendra Prasad
Sushil Kumar Modi	BJP	07-Dec-2020	02-Apr-2024	1	bye - death of Ram Vilas Paswan
Prem Chand Gupta	RJD	10-Apr-2020	09-Apr-2026	5	*
Amarendra Dhari Singh	RJD	10-Apr-2020	09-Apr-2026	1	*
Harivansh Narayan Singh	JDU	10-Apr-2020	09-Apr-2026	2	*
Ram Nath Thakur	JDU	10-Apr-2020	09-Apr-2026	2	*
Vivek Thakur	BJP	10-Apr-2020	04-Jun-2024	1	elected to Nawada Lok Sabha
Satish Chandra Dubey	BJP	09-Oct-2019	07-Jul-2022	1	bye - death of Ram Jethmalani
Ram Vilas Paswan	LJP	29-Jun-2019	08-Oct-2020	2	expired bye - resignation of Ravi Shankar Prasad
Ashfaque Karim	RJD	03-Apr-2018	02-Apr-2024	1	
Manoj Jha	RJD	03-Apr-2018	02-Apr-2024	1	
Mahendra Prasad	JDU	03-Apr-2018	27-Dec-2021	7	expired
Bashistha Narain Singh	JDU	03-Apr-2018	02-Apr-2024	3	
Ravi Shankar Prasad	BJP	03-Apr-2018	23-May-2019	4	elected to Patna Sahib Lok Sabha
Akhilesh Prasad Singh	INC	03-Apr-2018	02-Apr-2024	1	
Misa Bharti	RJD	08-Jul-2016	07-Jul-2022	1	
Ram Jethmalani	RJD	08-Jul-2016	08-Sep-2019	6	expired
Ramchandra Prasad Singh	JDU	08-Jul-2016	07-Jul-2022	2	
Sharad Yadav	JDU	08-Jul-2016	04-Dec-2017	4	disqualified
Gopal Narayan Singh	BJP	08-Jul-2016	07-Jul-2022	1	
Pavan Kumar Varma	JDU	23-Jun-2014	07-Jul-2016	1	bye - resignation of Rajiv Pratap Rudy
Gulam Rasool Balyawi	JDU	23-Jun-2014	07-Jul-2016	1	bye - resignation of Ram Vilas Paswan
Sharad Yadav	JDU	13-Jun-2014	07-Jul-2016	3	bye - resignation of Ram Kripal Yadav
Kahkashan Perween	JDU	10-Apr-2014	09-Apr-2020	1	
Harivansh Narayan Singh	JDU	10-Apr-2014	09-Apr-2020	1	
Ram Nath Thakur	JDU	10-Apr-2014	09-Apr-2020	1	
C. P. Thakur	BJP	10-Apr-2014	09-Apr-2020	2	
Ravindra Kishore Sinha	BJP	10-Apr-2014	09-Apr-2020	1	
K. C. Tyagi	JDU	07-Feb-2013	07-Jul-2016	1	bye - resignation of Upendra Kushwaha
Bashistha Narain Singh	JDU	03-Apr-2012	02-Apr-2018	2	
Ali Anwar	JDU	03-Apr-2012	04-Dec-2017	2	disqualified
Anil Kumar Sahani	JDU	03-Apr-2012	02-Apr-2018	2	
Mahendra Prasad	JDU	03-Apr-2012	02-Apr-2018	6	
Ravi Shankar Prasad	BJP	03-Apr-2012	02-Apr-2018	3	
Dharmendra Pradhan	BJP	03-Apr-2012	02-Apr-2018	1	
Sabir Ali	JDU	16-Dec-2011	09-Apr-2014	2	defected from LJP
Ramchandra Prasad Singh	JDU	08-Jul-2010	07-Jul-2016	1	
Upendra Kushwaha	JDU	08-Jul-2010	04-Jan-2013	1	resigned
Rajiv Pratap Rudy	BJP	08-Jul-2010	16-May-2014	2	elected to Saran Lok Sabha
Ram Kripal Yadav	RJD	08-Jul-2010	16-May-2014	1	elected to Pataliputra Lok Sabha
Ram Vilas Paswan	LJP	08-Jul-2010	16-May-2014	1	elected to Hajipur Lok Sabha
Anil Kumar Sahani	JDU	04-Jan-2010	02-Apr-2012	1	bye - death of Mahendra Sahni
George Fernandes	JDU	04-Aug-2009	07-Jul-2010	1	bye - resignation of Sharad Yadav
Rajiv Pratap Rudy	BJP	04-Jul-2008	07-Jul-2010	1	bye - disqualification of Jai Narain Prasad Nishad
Shivanand Tiwari	JDU	10-Apr-2008	09-Apr-2014	1	
N. K. Singh	JDU	10-Apr-2008	09-Apr-2014	1	
C. P. Thakur	BJP	10-Apr-2008	09-Apr-2014	1	
Prem Chand Gupta	RJD	10-Apr-2008	09-Apr-2014	3	
Sabir Ali	LJP	10-Apr-2008	09-Apr-2014	1	defected to JDU
Ejaz Ali	JDU	20-Mar-2008	07-Jul-2010	1	bye - death of Motiur Rehman
Ali Anwar	JDU	03-Apr-2006	02-Apr-2012	1	
Mahendra Prasad	JDU	03-Apr-2006	02-Apr-2012	5	
Mahendra Sahani	JDU	03-Apr-2006	06-Nov-2009	1	expired
Ravi Shankar Prasad	BJP	03-Apr-2006	02-Apr-2012	2	
Rajniti Prasad	RJD	03-Apr-2006	02-Apr-2012	1	
Jabir Husain	RJD	03-Apr-2006	02-Apr-2012	1	
Mangani Lal Mandal	RJD	23-Jun-2004	09-Apr-2008	1	bye - resignation of Lalu Prasad Yadav
Vidya Sagar Nishad	RJD	23-Jun-2004	02-Apr-2006	1	bye - resignation of Lalan Singh
Subhash Prasad Yadav	RJD	08-Jul-2004	07-Jul-2010	1	
Motiur Rahman	RJD	08-Jul-2004	18-Dec-2007	1	expired
Sharad Yadav	JDU	08-Jul-2004	16-May-2009	2	elected to Madhepura Lok Sabha
Jai Narain Prasad Nishad	BJP	08-Jul-2004	26-Mar-2008	1	disqualified
R. K. Dhawan	INC	08-Jul-2004	07-Jul-2010		
Lalu Prasad Yadav	RJD	10-Apr-2002	13-May-2004	1	elected to Chapra Lok Sabha
Ram Deo Bhandary	RJD	10-Apr-2002	09-Apr-2008	3	
Prem Chand Gupta	RJD	10-Apr-2002	09-Apr-2008	2	
Shatrughan Sinha	BJP	10-Apr-2002	09-Apr-2008	2	
Bashistha Narain Singh	SAP	10-Apr-2002	09-Apr-2008	1	
Vijay Singh Yadav	RJD	03-Apr-2000	02-Apr-2006	1	
Kum Kum Rai	RJD	03-Apr-2000	02-Apr-2006	1	
Faguni Ram	INC	03-Apr-2000	02-Apr-2006	3	
Ravi Shankar Prasad	BJP	03-Apr-2000	02-Apr-2006	1	
Lalan Singh	SAP	03-Apr-2000	13-May-2004	1	elected to Begusarai Lok Sabha
Mahendra Prasad	Ind	03-Apr-2000	02-Apr-2006	4	
Ven'ble Dhammaviriyo	RJD	29-Mar-2000	09-Apr-2002	1	bye - death of Jagdambi Mandal RS member from Jharkhand 15-Nov-2000 onwards
Ramendra Kumar Yadav	RJD	08-Jul-1998	07-Jul-2004	2	
Anil Kumar	RJD	08-Jul-1998	07-Jul-2004	2	
Saroj Dubey	RJD	08-Jul-1998	07-Jul-2004	1	
Kapil Sibal	INC	08-Jul-1998	13-May-2004	1	elected to Chandni Chowk Lok Sabha
Gaya Singh	CPI	08-Jul-1998	07-Jul-2004	2	
Shibu Soren	JMM	08-Jul-1998	07-Jul-2004	1	RS member from Jharkhand 15-Nov-2000 onwards
Parmeshwar Kumar Agarwalla	BJP	08-Jul-1998	07-Jul-2004	2	RS member from Jharkhand 15-Nov-2000 onwards
Ram Deo Bhandary	RJD	11-Jun-1998	09-Apr-2002	2	bye - death of Gyan Ranjan
Ranjan Prasad Yadav	JD	10-Apr-1996	09-Apr-2002	2	
Jagdambi Mandal	JD	10-Apr-1996	13-Jan-2000	1	expired
Prem Chand Gupta	JD	10-Apr-1996	09-Apr-2002	1	
Gyan Ranjan	INC	10-Apr-1996	22-Apr-1998	1	expired
Nagendra Nath Ojha	CPI	10-Apr-1996	09-Apr-2002	1	
Shatrughan Sinha	BJP	10-Apr-1996	09-Apr-2002	1	
Naresh Yadav	JD	03-Apr-1994	02-Apr-2000	1	
Mohammad Aas	JD	03-Apr-1994	02-Apr-2000	1	
Nagmani	JD	03-Apr-1994	07-Oct-1999	1	elected to Chatra Lok Sabha
Kamala Sinha	JD	03-Apr-1994	02-Apr-2000	2	
Jagannath Mishra	INC	03-Apr-1994	02-Apr-2000	2	
Sitaram Kesri	INC	03-Apr-1994	02-Apr-2000	5	
Jalaludin Ansari	CPI	03-Apr-1994	02-Apr-2000	1	
Janardan Yadav	BJP	03-Apr-1994	02-Apr-2000	1	
Brahmadev Anand Paswan	JD	01-Jun-1993	02-Apr-1994	1	bye - death of Bindeshwari Dubey
Ramendra Kumar Yadav	JD	08-Jul-1992	07-Jul-1998	1	
Ram Deo Bhandary	JD	08-Jul-1992	07-Jul-1998	1	
Anil Kumar	JD	08-Jul-1992	07-Jul-1998	1	
Inder Kumar Gujral	JD	08-Jul-1992	02-Mar-1998	3	elected to Jalandhar Lok Sabha
S. S. Ahluwalia	INC	08-Jul-1992	07-Jul-1998	2	
Gaya Singh	CPI	08-Jul-1992	07-Jul-1998	1	
Parmeshwar Kumar Agarwalla	BJP	08-Jul-1992	07-Jul-1998	1	
Kamala Sinha	JD	19-Apr-1990	02-Apr-1994	1	bye - resignation of Jagannath Mishra
Ranjan Prasad Yadav	JD	10-Apr-1990	09-Apr-1996	1	
Shankar Dayal Singh	JD	10-Apr-1990	26-Nov-1995	1	expired
Digvijay Singh	JD	10-Apr-1990	09-Apr-1996	1	
Rajni Ranjan Sahu	INC	10-Apr-1990	09-Apr-1996	2	
Rameshwar Thakur	INC	10-Apr-1990	09-Apr-1996	2	
Chaturanan Mishra	CPI	10-Apr-1990	09-Apr-1996	2	
Kameshwar Paswan	BJP	10-Apr-1990	09-Apr-1996	1	
Shamim Hashmi	INC	25-Sep-1989	02-Apr-1994	2	defected from Janata Dal
Jagannath Mishra	INC	03-Apr-1988	16-Apr-1990	1	resigned
Bindeshwari Dubey	INC	03-Apr-1988	20-Jan-1993	1	expired on 20-Jan-1993
Sitaram Kesri	INC	03-Apr-1988	02-Apr-1994	4	
Rafique Alam	INC	03-Apr-1988	02-Apr-1994	2	
Faguni Ram	INC	03-Apr-1988	02-Apr-1994	2	
Dayanand Sahay	INC	03-Apr-1988	02-Apr-1994	2	
Pratibha Singh	INC	03-Apr-1988	06-Jul-1992	4`	bye - death of Lakshmi Kant Jha
Yashwant Sinha	JD	03-Apr-1988	14-Nov-1993	1	resigned
Shamim Hashmi	JD	03-Apr-1988	27-Mar-1989	1	defected to Indian National Congress
Mahendra Prasad	INC	07-Jul-1986	06-Jul-1992	2	
Manorama Pandey	INC	07-Jul-1986	06-Jul-1992	2	
Lakshmi Kant Jha	INC	07-Jul-1986	16-Jan-1988	1	expired
S. S. Ahluwalia	INC	07-Jul-1986	06-Jul-1992	1	
Chandesh P Thakur	INC	07-Jul-1986	06-Jul-1992	1	
Ashwani Kumar	BJP	07-Jul-1986	06-Jul-1992	2	
Ram Awadhesh Singh	LKD	07-Jul-1986	06-Jul-1992	1	
Faguni Ram	INC	11-Feb-1985	02-Apr-1988	1	bye - resignation of Mahabir Prasad
Mahendra Prasad	INC	31-Jan-1985	06-Jul-1986	1	bye -
Anant Prasad Sharma	INC	22-Aug-1984	02-Apr-1988	3	bye - resignation of Bhishma Narain Singh
Durga Prasad Jamuda	INC	10-Apr-1984	09-Apr-1990	1	
Bandhu Mahto	INC	10-Apr-1984	09-Apr-1990	1	
Thakur Kamakhya Prasad Singh	INC	10-Apr-1984	09-Apr-1990	1	
Rameshwar Thakur	INC	10-Apr-1984	09-Apr-1990	1	
Rajni Ranjan Sahu	INC	10-Apr-1984	09-Apr-1990	1	
Chaturanan Mishra	CPI	10-Apr-1984	09-Apr-1990	1	
Kailashpati Mishra	BJP	10-Apr-1984	09-Apr-1990	1	
Chandan Bagchi	INC	12-Apr-1983	09-Apr-1984	1	bye -resignation of Anant Prasad Sharma
Rafique Alam	INC	03-Apr-1982	02-Apr-1988	1	
Mahendra Mohan Mishra	INC	03-Apr-1982	02-Apr-1988	2	
Bhishma Narain Singh	INC	03-Apr-1982	15-Apr-1984	2	appointed as Governor of Assam
Pratibha Singh	INC	03-Apr-1982	02-Apr-1988	3	
Ramanand Yadav	INC	03-Apr-1982	02-Apr-1988	2	
Suraj Prasad	CPI	03-Apr-1982	02-Apr-1988	2	
Mahabir Prasad	JP	03-Apr-1982	19-Jan-1985	1	resigned
Jagdambi Prasad Yadav	BJP	03-Apr-1982	02-Apr-1988	2	
Ramchandra Bharadwaj	INC	07-Jul-1980	06-Jul-1986	1	
Manorama Pandey	INC	07-Jul-1980	06-Jul-1986	1	
Sitaram Kesri	INC	07-Jul-1980	06-Jul-1986	3	
Ram Bhagat Paswan	INC	07-Jul-1980	06-Jul-1986	1	
Indradeep Sinha	CPI	07-Jul-1980	06-Jul-1986	2	
Hukmdev Narayan Yadav	JP	07-Jul-1980	06-Jul-1986	1	
Ashwani Kumar	BJP	07-Jul-1980	06-Jul-1986	1	
Syed Shahabuddin	JP	25-Jul-1979	09-Apr-1984	1	bye - death of Pranab Chatterjee
Brahmdeo Ram Shastri	JP	25-Jul-1979	02-Apr-1980	1	
Pranab Chatterjee	JP	10-Apr-1978	02-Jun-1979	1	expired
Shiva Chandra Jha	JP	10-Apr-1978	09-Apr-1984	1	
Dayanand Sahay	JP	10-Apr-1978	09-Apr-1984	1	
Ram Lakhan Prasad Gupta	BJS	10-Apr-1978	09-Apr-1984	1	
Anant Prasad Sharma	INC	10-Apr-1978	10-Mar-1983	2	appointed as Governor of West Bengal
J. K. P. N. Singh	INC	10-Apr-1978	09-Apr-1984	2	
Yogendra Sharma	CPI	10-Apr-1978	09-Apr-1984	2	
Mahendra Mohan Mishra	INC	03-Apr-1976	02-Apr-1982	1	
Dharamchand Jain	INC	03-Apr-1976	02-Apr-1982	2	
Bhishma Narain Singh	INC	03-Apr-1976	02-Apr-1982	1	
Pratibha Singh	INC	03-Apr-1976	02-Apr-1982	2	
Ramanand Yadav	INC	03-Apr-1976	02-Apr-1982	1	
Bhola Paswan Shastri	INC	03-Apr-1976	02-Apr-1982	2	
Aziza Imam	INC	03-Apr-1976	02-Apr-1982	2	
Bhola Prasad	CPI	03-Apr-1976	02-Apr-1982	2	
Hussain Zawar	INC	20-Dec-1975	09-Apr-1978	1	bye - death of Bhupendra Narayan Mandal
Kamalnath Jha	INC	03-Apr-1974	09-Jan-1980	2	elected to Saharsa Lok Sabha
Kameshwar Singh	INC	03-Apr-1974	02-Apr-1980	1	
Sitaram Kesri	INC	03-Apr-1974	02-Apr-1980	2	
Chandramanilal Chowdhary	INC	03-Apr-1974	08-Feb-1979	1	expired
Rajendra Kumar Poddar	Ind	03-Apr-1974	02-Apr-1980	2	
Indradeep Sinha	CPI	03-Apr-1974	02-Apr-1980	1	
Ram Kripal Sinha	BJS	03-Apr-1974	02-Apr-1980	1	
Aziza Imam	INC	20-Mar-1973	02-Apr-1976	1	bye -death of Mohammad Chaudhary A
Kamalnath Jha	INC	20-Mar-1973	02-Apr-1974	1	bye - death of Balkrishna Gupta
Bhola Paswan Shastri	INC	31-May-1972	02-Apr-1976	1	bye - resignation of Abdul Qaiyum Ansari
D. P. Singh	INC	10-Apr-1972	09-Apr-1978	2	
Gunanand Thakur	INC	10-Apr-1972	09-Apr-1978	1	
Jahanara Jaipal Singh	INC	10-Apr-1972	09-Apr-1978	3	
Shyam Lal Gupta	INC	10-Apr-1972	09-Apr-1978	1	
Bhaiya Ram Munda	INC	10-Apr-1972	09-Apr-1978	1	
Bhupendra Narayan Mandal	SSP	10-Apr-1972	21-Jul-1975	1	expired
Yogendra Sharma	CPI	10-Apr-1972	09-Apr-1978	1	
Sitaram Kesri	INC	02-Jul-1971	02-Apr-1974	1	bye - resignation of Anant Prasad Sharma
Bindeshwari Prasad Singh	INC	17-Jun-1971	02-Apr-1974	1	bye - death of Rudra Narain Jha
D. P. Singh	INC	17-Jun-1971	02-Apr-1972	1	bye - resignation of Shyam Nandan Prasad Mishra
Pratibha Singh	INC	31-Dec-1970	02-Apr-1976	1	bye - death of Shrikant Mishra
Awadeshwar Prasad Sinha	INC	03-Apr-1970	02-Apr-1976	4	
Dharamchand Jain	INC	03-Apr-1970	02-Apr-1976	1	
Abdul Qaiyum Ansari	INC	03-Apr-1970	19-Mar-1972	1	resigned
Mohammad Chaudhary A	INC(O)	03-Apr-1970	07-Feb-1973	3	expired
Shishir Kumar	PSP	03-Apr-1970	02-Apr-1976	2	
Sitaram Singh	SSP	03-Apr-1970	02-Apr-1976	1	
Bhola Prasad	CPI	03-Apr-1970	02-Apr-1976	1	
Shrikant Mishra	BJS	03-Apr-1970	01-Oct-1970	1	expired
Anant Prasad Sharma	INC	03-Apr-1968	11-Mar-1971	1	elected to Buxar Lok Sabha
Mahabir Dass	INC	03-Apr-1968	04-Apr-1974	2	
Rudra Narain Jha	SSP	03-Apr-1968	10-May-1971	1	expired
Balkrishna Gupta	SSP	03-Apr-1968	10-Sep-1972	1	expired
Rajendra Kumar Poddar	Ind	03-Apr-1968	04-Apr-1974	1	
Suraj Prasad	CPI	03-Apr-1968	04-Apr-1974	1	
Jagdambi Prasad Yadav	BJS	03-Apr-1968	04-Apr-1974	1	
Rewati Kant Sinha	SSP	07-Apr-1967	02-Apr-1970	1	bye -
Lalit Narayan Mishra	INC	03-Apr-1966	02-Apr-1972	2	
Shyam Nandan Prasad Mishra	INC	03-Apr-1966	11-Mar-1972	2	elected to Begusarai Lok Sabha
Pratul Chandra Mitra	INC	03-Apr-1966	02-Apr-1972	2	
Rajendra Pratap Sinha	INC	03-Apr-1966	02-Apr-1972	4	
Raghunath Prasad Khaitan	INC	03-Apr-1966	02-Apr-1972	1	
Bhupendra Narayan Mandal	SSP	03-Apr-1966	02-Apr-1972	1	
Lalit Narayan Mishra	INC	18-Feb-1964	02-Apr-1966	1	bye - resignation of Ramdhari Singh Dinkar
Awadeshwar Prasad Sinha	INC	03-Apr-1964	02-Apr-1970	3	
Rama Bahadur Sinha	INC	03-Apr-1964	02-Apr-1970	3	
Braja Kishore Prasad Sinha	INC	03-Apr-1964	02-Apr-1970	3	
Jahanara Jaipal Singh	INC	03-Apr-1964	02-Apr-1970	2	
Anand Chand	INC	03-Apr-1964	02-Apr-1970	2	
Sheel Bhadra Yajee	INC	03-Apr-1964	02-Apr-1970	3	
Mohammad Chaudhary A	INC	03-Apr-1964	02-Apr-1970	2	
Shishir Kumar	PSP	03-Apr-1964	02-Apr-1970	1	
Mahabir Dass	INC	03-Apr-1962	02-Apr-1968	1	
Dhirendra Chandra Mallik	INC	03-Apr-1962	02-Apr-1968	1	
J. K. P. N. Singh	INC	03-Apr-1962	02-Apr-1968	1	
Syed Mahmud	INC	03-Apr-1962	02-Apr-1968	1	
Bipin Bihari Varma	INC	03-Apr-1962	02-Apr-1968	1	
Ganga Sharan Sinha	INC	03-Apr-1962	02-Apr-1968	2	
Mohammad Chaudhary A	INC	22-Sep-1961	02-Apr-1964	1	bye - death of Kazi Ahmad Hussain
Ramdhari Singh Dinkar	INC	03-Apr-1960	26-Jan-1964	3	resigned
Pratul Chandra Mitra	INC	03-Apr-1960	02-Apr-1966	1	
Mahesh Saran	INC	03-Apr-1960	29-Nov-1965	2	expired
Lakshmi N. Menon	INC	03-Apr-1960	02-Apr-1966	3	
Rajeshwar Prasad Narain Sinha	INC	03-Apr-1960	02-Apr-1966	3	
Rajendra Pratap Sinha	PSP	03-Apr-1960	02-Apr-1966	3	
Kameshwar Singh	Ind	03-Apr-1960	01-Oct-1962	2	expired
Rajeshwar Prasad Narain Sinha	INC	12-Oct-1959	02-Apr-1960	2	bye - death of Purna Chandra Mitra
Jahanara Jaipal Singh	INC	03-Apr-1958	02-Apr-1964	1	
Anand Chand	INC	03-Apr-1958	02-Apr-1964	1	
Awadeshwar Prasad Sinha	INC	03-Apr-1958	02-Apr-1964	2	
Braja Kishore Prasad Sinha	INC	03-Apr-1958	02-Apr-1964	2	
Rama Bahadur Sinha	INC	03-Apr-1958	02-Apr-1964	2	
Sheel Bhadra Yajee	INC	03-Apr-1958	02-Apr-1964	2	
Kazi Ahmad Hussain	INC	03-Apr-1958	14-Aug-1961	2	expired
Devendra Prasad Singh	PSP	03-Apr-1958	02-Apr-1964	1	
Kamta Singh	SWA	03-Apr-1958	02-Apr-1964	1	
Sheel Bhadra Yajee	INC	27-Apr-1957	02-Apr-1958	1	bye - resignation of Vijaya Raje
Awadeshwar Prasad Sinha	INC	10-Dec-1956	02-Apr-1958	1	bye - resignation of Sri Narayan Mahtha
Krishna Mohan Pyare Sinha	INC	10-Dec-1956	02-Apr-1958	1	bye -
Ganga Sharan Sinha	INC	03-Apr-1956	02-Apr-1962	1	
Shah Mohamad Umair	INC	03-Apr-1956	02-Apr-1962	1	
Michael John	INC	03-Apr-1956	02-Apr-1962	1	
Mazhar Imam Syed	INC	03-Apr-1956	02-Apr-1962	2	
Kishori Ram	INC	03-Apr-1956	02-Apr-1962	2	
Tajamul Husain	INC	03-Apr-1956	02-Apr-1962	2	
Ramdhari Singh Dinkar	INC	03-Apr-1954	02-Apr-1960	2	
Rajendra Pratap Sinha	INC	03-Apr-1954	02-Apr-1960	2	
Puran Chanda Mitra	INC	03-Apr-1954	23-Aug-1959	2	expired
Mahesh Saran	INC	03-Apr-1954	02-Apr-1960	1	
Kailash Bihari Lall	INC	03-Apr-1954	19-Mar-1960	2	expired
Lakshmi N. Menon	INC	03-Apr-1954	02-Apr-1960	2	
Theodore Bodra	JHP	03-Apr-1954	02-Apr-1960	1	
Angelina Tiga	JHP	03-Apr-1952	02-Apr-1954	1	
Ramdhari Singh Dinkar	INC	03-Apr-1952	02-Apr-1954	1	
Voladi Ganapathi Gopal	INC	03-Apr-1952	02-Apr-1956	1	
Jafar Imam	INC	03-Apr-1952	02-Apr-1956	1	
Khawaja Inaitullah	INC	03-Apr-1952	02-Apr-1954	1	
Kailash Bihari Lall	INC	03-Apr-1952	02-Apr-1954	1	
Ahmad Hussain Kazi	INC	03-Apr-1952	02-Apr-1958	1	
Sri Narayan Mahtha	INC	03-Apr-1952	06-Oct-1956	1	expired
Mazhar Imam Syed	INC	03-Apr-1952	02-Apr-1956	1	
Lakshmi N. Menon	INC	03-Apr-1952	02-Apr-1954	1	
Dr. Puran Chanda Mitra	INC	03-Apr-1952	02-Apr-1954	1	
Kishori Ram	INC	03-Apr-1952	02-Apr-1956	1	
Kameshwar Singh	INC	03-Apr-1952	02-Apr-1958	1	
Braja Kishore Prasad Sinha	INC	03-Apr-1952	02-Apr-1958	1	
Maheshwar Prasad Narain Sinha	INC	03-Apr-1952	02-Apr-1956	1	
Rajendra Pratap Sinha	INC	03-Apr-1952	02-Apr-1954	1	
Rajeshwar Prasad Narain Sinha	INC	03-Apr-1952	02-Apr-1958	1	
Rama Bahadur Sinha	INC	03-Apr-1952	02-Apr-1958	1	
Tajamul Husain	INC	03-Apr-1952	02-Apr-1956	1	
Kunwarani Vijaya Raje	INC	03-Apr-1952	20-Mar-1957	1	elected to Chatra Lok Sabha
Ram Gopal Agarwala	INC	03-Apr-1952	02-Apr-1956	1	
Ram Gopal Agarwala	INC	03-Apr-1956	02-Apr-1962	2	
