= 1956 Rajya Sabha elections =

Elections for the Upper House of Indian Parliament

Rajya Sabha elections, 1956
- 1956
Elected Rajya Sabha members for term 1956-1962
TBD

Rajya Sabha elections were held in 1956, to elect members of the Rajya Sabha, Indian Parliament's upper chamber.

== Elections ==
Elections were held in 1956 to elect members from various states. The list is incomplete.

=== Members elected ===
The following members are elected in the elections held in 1956. They are members for the term 1956-62 and retire in year 1962, except in case of the resignation or death before the term.

State - Member - Party

Rajya Sabha members for term 1956–1962
State	Member Name	Party	Remark
Ajmer & Coorg	Abdul Shakoor Maulana	INC	
Andhra	V C Keshava Rao	INC	
Andhra	A Balarami Reddy	INC	res 09/03/1962
Andhra	N Narotham Reddy	INC	res 15/03/1960 LS
Andhra	Yasoda Reddy	INC	res 27/02/1962 2LS
Andhra	V Ventakaramana	INC	
Assam	Pushpalata Das	INC	
Assam	Purna Chandra Sharma	INC	
Bilaspur & Himachal Pradesh	Lila Devi	INC	
Bihar	Ram Gopal Agarwala	INC	
Bihar	Michael John	INC	
Bihar	Kishori Ram	INC	
Bihar	Syed Mazhar Imam	INC	
Bihar	Awadeshwar Prasad Sinha	INC	
Bihar	Ganga Sharan Sinha	OTH	
Bihar	Tajamul Husain	INC	
Bihar	Shah Mohd. Umair	INC	
Bombay	B. R. Ambedkar	OTH	Dea. 06/12/1956
Bombay	Trimbak R Deogirikar	INC	
Bombay	Dr M D D Gilder	INC	term till 1960
Bombay	Dr N. S. Hardikar	INC	
Bombay	Gajanan R Kulkarni	INC	
Bombay	D Y Pawar	INC	
Bombay	Manilal C Shah	INC	Dea. 09/01/1960
Bombay	Manubhai C Shah	INC	Res. 12/03/1957 2LS
Bombay	Meghjibhai P Shah	INC	Res. 26/07/1957
Delhi	Onkar Nath	INC	Res. 16/04/1955
Hyderabad	V K Dhage	IND	term till 1960
Hyderabad	Dr Raj Bahadur Goud	INC	
Jammu & Kashmir	Syed M Jalali	JKNC	dea. 22/02/1961
Kutch	Premji Bhavanji Thacker	INC	Res. 26/07/1952
Madhya Bharat	Kanhailal D Vaidya	INC	
Madhya Bharat	Krishna Kant Vyas	INC	
Madhya Pradesh	Dr Waman S Barlingay	INC	
Madhya Pradesh	Mohammad Ali	INC	
Madhya Pradesh	Ram Sahai	INC	
Madhya Pradesh	Rukmani Bai	INC	
Madhya Pradesh	Dr Raghu Vira	INC	
Madhya Pradesh	Marotirao D Tumpalliwar	INC	res. 12/03/1962
Madras	V. K. Krishna Menon	INC	res. 15/03/1957 2LS
Madras	A Ramaswami Mudaliar	IND	
Madras	V M Obaidullah Sahib	INC	dea. 21/02/1958
Madras	T.S. Pattabiraman	INC	
Madras	T N Ramamurti	INC	
Madras	S Venkatanaraman	INC	
Manipur and Tripura	Abdul Latif	INC	
Manipur	Laimayum L M Sharma	INC	ele 01/12/1956 term till 1960
Mysore	S V Krishna Moorty Rao	INC	01/03/1962
Mysore	M Govinda Reddy	INC	
Mysore	J R Desai	OTH	
Mysore	Dr N. S. Hardikar	INC	
Nominated	Rukmini Devi Arundale	NOM	
Nominated	N. R. Malkani	NOM	
Nominated	Dr B. V. Warekar	NOM	
Nominated	Dr Zakir Hussain	NOM	res 06/07/1957
Orissa	Bhagirathi Mahapatra	INC	
Orissa	Maheshwar Naik	INC	res. 27/02/1962 3LS
Orissa	Abhimanyu Rath	INC	
P E P S U	Lt. Col Joginder Singh Mann	OTH	
Punjab	Chaman Lall Diwan	INC	
Punjab	Darshan Singh Pheruman	INC	till 22/10/1956
Punjab	Zail Singh	INC	res 10/03/1962
Rajasthan	Sharda Bhargava	INC	
Rajasthan	Jaswantt Singh	OTH	
Rajasthan	Dr Kalu Lal Shrimali	INC	01 Mar 1962
Saurashtra	Nanabhai Bhat	INC	
Saurashtra	Bhogilal M Shah	INC	
Travancore & Cochin	K P Madhavan Nair	INC	
Travancore & Cochin	M N Govindan Nair	CPM	
Travancore & Cochin	P Narayan Nair	INC	term till 1960
Uttar Pradesh	Akhtar Hussain	INC	
Uttar Pradesh	Jogesh Chandra Chatterjee	INC	term till 1960
Uttar Pradesh	Jashaud Singh Bhist	INC	
Uttar Pradesh	Jaspat Roy Kapoor	INC	
Uttar Pradesh	Dr Hriday Nath Kunzru	IND	
Uttar Pradesh	Chandravati Lakhanpal	INC	
Uttar Pradesh	Anis Kidwai	INC	
Uttar Pradesh	Savitri Devi Nigam	INC	res. 28/02/1962 3LS
Uttar Pradesh	Har Prasad Saksena	INC	
Uttar Pradesh	Prakash Narayan Sapru	INC	
Uttar Pradesh	Ram Kripal Singh	INC	Dea. 14/03/1961
Uttar Pradesh	Ram Prasad Tamta	INC	res. 01/05/1958
Vindyachal Pradesh	Ahmed Gulsher	OTH	
West Bengal	Satyapriya Banerjee	FB	term till 1960; Dea. 23/03/1957
West Bengal	P D Himatsingka	INC	Res 27/02/1962 3LS
West Bengal	Prof Humayun Kabir	INC	Res 27/02/1962 3LS
West Bengal	Satyendra Prosad Ray	INC	

== Bye-elections ==
The following bye elections were held in the year 1956.

State - Member - Party

1. Delhi - Begum Siddiqa Kidwai - INC ( ele 24/11/1956, term till 1958 )
2. Delhi - Onkar Nath - INC ( ele 24/11/1956 term till 1960 )
3. Assam - Mahendramohan Chaudhury - INC ( ele 01/12/1956 term till 1958 )
4. Orissa - Govind Chandra Misra - INC ( ele 06/12/1956 term till 1960 )
5. Bihar - Awadeshwar Prasad Sinha - INC ( ele 10/12/1956 term till 1958 )
6. Bihar - Krishna Mohan Pyare Sinha- INC ( ele 10/12/1956 term till 1958 )
7. Madras - Dawood Ali Mirza - INC ( ele 11/12/1956 term till 1962)
8. Uttar Pradesh - Mahabir Prasad Bhargava - INC ( ele 13/12/1956 term 1958 )
9. Uttar Pradesh - Bal Krishna Sharma - INC ( ele 13/12/1956 term 1962 death 29/04/1960 )
10. Uttar Pradesh - Pandit Algu Rai Shastri - INC ( ele 13/12/1956 term 1962 res. 24/04/1958 )
11. West Bengal - Surendra Mohan Ghose - INC ( ele 13/12/1956 term till 1962 )
12. West Bengal - Mehr Chand Khanna - INC ( ele 15/12/1956 res 26/02/1962 3LS )
