= 1976 Rajya Sabha elections =

Rajya Sabha elections were held in 1976, to elect members of the Rajya Sabha, Indian Parliament's upper chamber.

== Elections ==
Elections were held in 1976 to elect members from various state. The list is incomplete.

=== Members elected ===
The following members are elected in the elections held in 1976. They are members for the term 1976-1982 and retire in year 1982 after completion of six-year term, except in case of the resignation or death before the term.

State - Member - Party

Rajya Sabha members for term 1976-1982
State	Member Name	Party	Remark
Assam	Bipinpal Das	INC	R
Assam	Syed A Malik	INC	
AP	M R Krishna	INC	
AP	K L N Prasad	INC	
AP	M Rahmathulla	INC	
AP	Palavalasa Rajasekharan	INC	
AP	V B Raju	INC	
AP	Venigalla Satyanarayana	INC	dea 20/10/1980
BH	Bhola Prasad	CPI	
BH	Aziza Imam	INC	
BH	Dharamchand Jain	INC	
BH	Mahendra Mohan Mishra	INC	
BH	Bhola Paswan Shastri	INC	
BH	Bhishma Narain Singh	INC	
BH	Pratibha Singh	INC	
BH	Ramanand_Yadav	INC	
DL	Charanjit Chanana	INC	
GJ	L K Advani	JS	
GJ	Mohammedhusain Golandaz	INC	
GJ	Kumud Ben Joshi	INC	
GJ	Yogendra Makwana	INC	
HP	Roshan Lal	INC	
JK	Tirath Ram Amla	INC	
JK	Om Mehta	INC	
KA	R M Desai	INC	
KA	K S Malle Gowda	INC	
KA	F M Khan	INC	
KA	Mulka Govind Reddy	INC	
KL	S. Kumaran	CPI	
KL	K K Madhavan	INC	
KL	Pattiam Rajan	CPM	
MH	A R Antuly	INC	Res. 03 July 1980
MH	Bapuraoji M Deshmukh	INC	
MH	V. N. Gadgil	INC	Res. 07 Jan 1980
MH	Saroj Khaparde	INC	
MH	S K Vaishampayen	IND	Death 24/08/1981
MH	Govind R Mhaisekar	INC	
MP	Balram Das	INC	
MP	Gurudev Gupta	INC	
MP	Ratan Kumari	INC	
MP	P C Sethi	INC	07/01/1980
MP	Sawai Singh Sisodia	INC	
MP	Shrikant Verma	INC	
NOM	B N Banerjee	NOM	
NOM	Maragatham Chandrasekar	INC	
NOM	Prof Rasheeduddin Khan	NOM	
OR	Narasingha Prasad Nanda	INC	
OR	Nilomani Routray	JP	Res. 26/06/1977
OR	Santosh Kumar Sahu	INC	
RJ	M U Arif	INC	
RJ	S S Bhandari	JP	
RJ	Dinesh Chandra Swami	INC	
RJ	Ushi Khan	INC	
PB	Amarjit Kaur	INC	
PB	Bansi Lal	IND	Res. 07 Jan 1980
PB	Raghbir Singh Gill	INC	Disq. 09 May 1980
PB	Sat Paul Mittal	INC	
UP	Bhagwan Din	INC	
UP	Hamida Habibullah	INC	
UP	Krishna Nand Joshi	INC	
UP	Ghayoor Ali Khan	OTH	Res. 08/01/1980
UP	Prakash Mehrotra	INC	Res. 09/08/1981
UP	Suresh Narain Mulla	INC	
UP	Bishambhar_Nath_Pande	INC	
UP	Nageshwar Prasad Shahi	OTH	
UP	Bhanu Pratap Singh	IND	
UP	Triloki Singh	INC	Death 29/01/1980
UP	Shyamlal_Yadav	INC	
WB	Prasenjit Barman	INC	
WB	Sankar Ghose	INC	
WB	Bhupesh Gupta	CPI	dea 06/08/1981
WB	Phanindra Nath Hansda	INC	
WB	Purabi Mukhopadhyay	INC	

== Bye-elections ==
The following bye elections were held in the year 1976. State - Member - Party

1. PB - Bhupinder Singh - INC ( ele 13/10/1976 term till 1978 )
