= 1970 Rajya Sabha elections =

Elections for the Upper House of Indian Parliament

Rajya Sabha elections were held in 1970, to elect members of the Rajya Sabha, Indian Parliament's upper chamber.

== Elections ==
Elections were held in 1970 to elect members from various states. The list is incomplete.

=== Members elected ===
The following members are elected in the elections held in 1970. They are members for the term 1970-76 and retire in year 1976, except in case of the resignation or death before the term.

State - Member - Party

Rajya Sabha members for term 1970-1976
State	Member Name	Party	Remark
Assam	Bipinpal Das	INC	R
Assam	Emonsing M Sangma	INC	
AP	M R Krishna	INC	
AP	K L N Prasad	INC	
AP	V B Raju	INC	
AP	K Srinivasa Rao	IND	
AP	Gaddam Narayana Reddy	INC	
AP	Venigalla Satyanarayana	INC	
AP	D Sanjivayya	INC	Death 07 May 1972
BH	A Q Ansari	INC	Res. 19/03/1972
BH	Bhola Prasad	CPI	
BH	Aziza Imam	INC	elec 20/03/1973
BH	Dharamchand Jain	INC	
BH	Shrikant Mishra	JS	Death 01 Oct 1970
BH	Mohammad Chaudhary A	INC	Death 07 Feb 1973
BH	Bhola Paswan Shastri	INC	
BH	Shishir Kumar	OTH	
BH	Awadeshwar Prasad Sinha	INC	
BH	Sitaram Singh	OTH	
DL	L K Advani	JS	
GJ	Kumud Ben Joshi	INC	
GJ	Yogendra Makwana	INC	elec. 05 Mar 1973
GJ	D K Patel	JS	
GJ	Manubhai Shah	INC	
GJ	Shamprasad R Vasavada	CO	Death 20/11/1972
HP	Roshan Lal	INC	
HP	D D Puri	INC	
JK	Tirath Ram Amla	INC	
JK	Om Mehta	INC	
KA	K Nagappa Alva	CO	
KA	K S Malle Gowda	INC	
KA	B P Nagaraja Murthy	INC	
KA	Mulka Govind Reddy	INC	
KL	K Chandrasekaran	SP	
KL	S. Kumaran	CPI	
KL	Dr K Mathew Kurian	CPM	
MP	S C Angre	OTH	
MP	Balram Das	INC	
MP	Vijay Bhushan Deosharan	JP	
MP	Chakrapani Shukla	INC	
MP	Sawai Singh Sisodia	INC	
MP	Bhawani Prasad Tiwary	INC	
MH	Shankarrao Bobdey	INC	
MH	Babubhai M Chinai	IND	Death 07 July 1975
MH	Mohan Dharia	INC	Res. 10 Mar 1971
MH	V. N. Gadgil	INC	
MH	N G Goray	OTH	
MH	A. G. Kulkarni	INC	
MH	Dahyabhai_Patel	INC	Death 11/08/1973
MH	Sriniwas G. Sardesai	CPI	
NOM	Maragatham Chandrasekar	INC	
NOM	Jairamdas Daulatram	NOM	
NOM	Umashankar Joshi	NOM	
NOM	Prof Rasheeduddin Khan	NOM	
OR	Bira Kesari Deo	OTH	
OR	K P Singh Deo	OTH	elec. 28/01/1972
OR	Binoy Kumar Mahanti	INC	
OR	Surajmal Saha	INC	Death 13/09/1971
PB	Bhupinder Singh	SAD	
PB	Inder Kumar Gujral	INC	
PB	Gurcharan Singh Tohra	SAD	
RJ	M U Arif	INC	
RJ	Jagdish Prasad Mathur	JS	
RJ	Narayani Devi Varma	INC	
TN	A K A Abdul Samad	ML	
TN	T V Anandan	CO	
TN	K Kalyanasudaram	DMK	
TN	S S Mariswamy	DMK	
TN	S S T Rajendran	DMK	
TN	T K Srinivasan	DMK	
UP	Uma Shankar Dikshit	INC	Res. 10 Jan 1976
UP	Inder Singh	INC	
UP	Kalyan Chand	INC	
UP	Nawal Kishore	INC	Death 19/04/1975
UP	Nageshwar Prasad Shahi	OTH	
UP	Mahavir Prasad Shukla	INC	
UP	Tribhuvan Narain Singh	C-O	
UP	Triloki Singh	INC	
UP	Dattopant Thengadi	JS	
UP	Mahavir Tyagi	CO	
UP	Shyamlal_Yadav	INC	
WB	Salil Kumar Ganguli	CPM	
WB	Bhupesh Gupta	CPI	
WB	Purabi Mukhopadhyay	INC	
WB	Sasankasekhar Sanyal	CPM	
WB	Dwijendralal Sen Gupta	IND	

== Bye-elections ==
The following bye elections were held in the year 1970.

State - Member - Party

1. Kerala - H A Schamnad - ML ( ele 05/02/1970 term till 1973 ) d of Kesavan Thazhava
2. Mysore - M Sherkhan - INC ( ele 30/03/1970 term till 1972 )
3. Haryana - Sultan Singh - INC ( ele 31/03/1970 term till 1974 )
4. Nominated - M N Kaul - NOM ( ele 03/04/1970 term till 1972 )
5. Kerala - N K Krishnan - CPI ( ele 10/11/1970 term till 1974 )
6. Bihar - Pratibha Singh - INC ( ele 31/12/1970 term till 1976 )
7. Uttar Pradesh - Shiv Swaroop Singh - INC ( ele 31/12/1970 term till 1972 )
