= 1968 Rajya Sabha elections =

Rajya Sabha elections were held in 1968, to elect members of the Rajya Sabha, Indian Parliament's upper chamber.

== Elections ==
Elections were held in 1968 to elect members from various states. The list is incomplete.

=== Members elected ===
The following members are elected in the elections held in 1968. They are members for the term 1968-74 and retire in year 1974, except in case of the resignation or death before the term.

State - Member - Party

Rajya Sabha members for term 1968-1974
State	Member Name	Party	Remark
Andhra	M H Samuel	INC	dea 16/02/1972
Andhra	Dr M Chenna Reddy	INC	res 26/11/1968
Andhra	K V Raghunatha Reddy	INC	
Andhra	Chandramouli Jagarlamudi	OTH	
Andhra	Sanda Narayanappa	OTH	
Andhra	M Srinivasa Reddy	INC	
Assam	Islam Baharul	INC	Res 20/01/1972
Assam	Barbora Golap	SSP	
Bihar	Anand Prasad Sharma	INC	11/03/1971
Bihar	Suraj Prasad	OTH	
Bihar	Jagdambi Prasad Yadav	BJP	
Bihar	Rajendra Kumar Poddar	IND	
Bihar	Mahabir Dass	INC	
Bihar	Balkrishna Gupta	INC	dea 10/09/1972
Bihar	Rudra Narain Jha	INC	dea 10/05/1971
Delhi	Dr Bhai Mahavir	JS	
Gujarat	Jaisukh Lal Hathi	INC	
Gujarat	Tribhovandas K Patel	INC	
Gujarat	U N Mahida	IND	
Haryana	Ram Rizaq	INC	res 03/02/1970
Haryana	Bhagwat Dayal Sharma	INC	
Himachal Pradesh	Satyavati Dang	INC	
Jammu and Kashmir	Hussain Syed	INC	res 05/03/1974
Karnataka	M L Kollur	INC	
Karnataka	U K Lakshmana Gowda	IND	
Karnataka	B T Kemparaj	INC	
Kerala	C Achutha Menon	CPI	res 24/04/1970
Kerala	K P S Menon	CPM	
Kerala	G Gopinath Nair	RSP	
Madras	K S Ramaswami	INC	
Madras	M Ruthnaswamy	OTH	
Madras	G A Appan	INC	
Madras	Thillai Villalan	DMK	
Madhya Pradesh	Ram Sahai	INC	
Madhya Pradesh	N P Chaudhari	INC	
Madhya Pradesh	Shyamkumari Devi	INC	
Madhya Pradesh	Ahmad Syed	INC	
Madhya Pradesh	N K Shejwalkar	JS	
Maharashtra	Bhaurao K Gaikwad	INC	dea 29/12/1971
Maharashtra	J S Tilak	INC	
Maharashtra	Bidesh T Kulkarni	INC	
Maharashtra	Pandharinath Sitaramji Patil	INC	
Maharashtra	Puttappa Patil	OTH	
Maharashtra	Dr Sarojini Babar	INC	
Maharashtra	T G Deshmukh	INC	
Nagaland	Melhupra Vero	INC	
Nominated	Joachim Alva	NOM	
Nominated	Prof Saiyid Nurul Hasan	NOM	res 30/09/1971
Nominated	Ganga Sharan Sinha	NOM	
Nominated	Dr K Ramiah	NOM	
Orissa	Sudarmani Patel	INC	
Orissa	Nandini Satpathy	INC	res 29/11/1972
Orissa	Krishna Chandra Panda	OTH	res 14/03/1972
Punjab	Gurmukh Singh Musafir	INC	
Punjab	Rattan Lal Jain	INC	
Rajashtan	Harish Chandra Mathur	INC	dea 12/06/1968
Rajashtan	Ram Niwas Mirdha	INC	
Rajashtan	Chaudhari Kumbharam Arya	INC	
Rajashtan	Bal Krishna Kaul	INC	
Rajashtan	Mahendra Kumar Mohta	OTH	
Tamil Nadu	H A Khaja Mohideen	ML	
Tripura	Dr Triguna Sen	INC	
Uttar Pradesh	Godey Murahari	OTH	
Uttar Pradesh	Chandra Shekhar	INC	
Uttar Pradesh	Maulana Asad Madani	INC	
Uttar Pradesh	Prem Manohar	JS	
Uttar Pradesh	Shyam Dhar Misra	INC	
Uttar Pradesh	Sitaram Jaipuria	INC	
Uttar Pradesh	C D Pande	INC	
Uttar Pradesh	Ganeshi Lal Chaudhary	CO	
Uttar Pradesh	Ajit Prasad Jain	INC	
Uttar Pradesh	Pitamber Das	OTH	
Uttar Pradesh	Prithwi Nath	OTH	
Uttar Pradesh	Man Singh Varma	JAN	

== Bye-elections ==
The following bye elections were held in the year 1968.

State - Member - Party

1. Nominated - D Sankara Kurup - NOM ( ele 03/04/1968 term till 1972 )
2. Gujarat - Shamprasad R Vasavada - CO ( ele 30/08/1968 term till 1970 )
