= 1960 Rajya Sabha elections =

Elections for the Upper House of Indian Parliament

Rajya Sabha elections, 1960
- 1960
Elected Rajya Sabha members for term 1960-1966
TBD

Rajya Sabha elections were held in 1960, to elect members of the Rajya Sabha, Indian Parliament's upper chamber.

== Elections ==
Elections were held in 1960 to elect members from various states. The list is incomplete.

=== Members elected ===
The following members are elected in the elections held in 1960. They are members for the term 1960-66 and retire in year 1966, except in case of the resignation or death before the term.

State - Member - Party

Rajya Sabha members for term 1960-1966
State	Member Name	Party	Remark
Andhra	Makineni Basavapunnaiah	CPI	R
Andhra	Akbar Ali Khan	INC	
Andhra	Kota Punnaiah	INC	
Andhra	Dr K L Narsimha Rao	INC	
Andhra	B Gopala Reddi	INC	27/02/1962
Andhra	J C Nagi Reddy	INC	16/09/1964
Assam	Lila Dhar Barooah	INC	
Assam	Bedavati Buragohain	INC	
Assam	Suresh Chandra Deb	INC	
Bihar	Ramdhari Singh Dinkar	INC	Res 26/01/1964
Bihar	Mahesh Saran	INC	Dea 29/11/1965
Bihar	Lakshmi N. Menon	INC	
Bihar	Pratul Chandra Mitra	INC	
Bihar	Kameshwara Singh	IND	Dea 01/10/1962
Bihar	Rajendra Pratap Sinha	IND	
Bihar	Rajeshwar Prasad Narain Sinha	INC	
Bombay	Dajiba B Desai	INC	
Bombay	Suresh J Desai	INC	
Bombay	Jethalal H Joshi	INC	
Bombay	Shripad K Limaye	INC	
Bombay	Mahipatray M Mehta	INC	
Bombay	Devkinandan Narayan	INC	
Bombay	Vinayakrao P Patil	INC	Res 01/12/1962
Bombay	Kodardas K Shah	INC	
Delhi	Shanta Vasisht	INC	
Jammu & Kashmir	Krishan Dutt	INC	
Kerala	Joseph Mathen	INC	
Kerala	E S Sait	ML	
Madhya Pradesh	Gurudev Gupta	INC	
Madhya Pradesh	Ratanlal K Malviya	INC	
Madhya Pradesh	Vithalrao T Nagpure	INC	
Madhya Pradesh	Thakur Bhannu Pratap Singh	INC	
Madhya Pradesh	Kesho Prasad Verma	INC	Disq 22/12/1960
Madhya Pradesh	Gopikrishna Vijaivargiya	INC	
Madras	N M Anwar	INC	
Madras	N Ramakrishna Iyer	OTH	
Madras	K Madhav Menon	INC	
Madras	Prof G Parthasarathy	INC	
Madras	T.S. Pattabiraman	INC	
Madras	P Ramamurti	CPI	
Madras	Thomas Srinivasan	INC	Dea 17/04/1963
Maharashtra	Vithalrao T Nagpure	INC	
Manipur	Laimayum L M Sharma	INC	Dea 02/11/1964
Mysore	Violet Alva	INC	
Mysore	M S Gurupadaswamy	INC	
Mysore	B C Nanjundaiya	INC	
Mysore	N Sri Ram Reddy	INC	
Nominated	Prof A R Wadia	NOM	
Nominated	Tara Shankar Banerjee	NOM	
Nominated	Prof Satyendra Nath Bose	NOM	Res. 02/07/1959
Nominated	Sardar A N Panikkar	NOM	Res 22/05/1961
Nominated	Moturi Satyanarayana	NOM.	
Orissa	Bishwanath Das	INC	Res. 22/06/1961
Orissa	Nand Kishore Das	INC	
Orissa	Bairangi Dwibedy	INC	
Orissa	Lokanath Misra	OTH	
Punjab	Bansi Lal	INC	
Punjab	Mohan Singh	INC	
Punjab	Neki Ram	INC	
Punjab	Sardar Raghbir Singh	INC	Earlier P E P S U
Rajasthan	Chaudhari_Kumbharam_Arya	INC	Res 26/10/1964 RAJ Assembly
Rajasthan	Vijay Singh	INC	Dea. 13/05/1964
Rajasthan	Jai Narayan Vyas	INC	Dea. 14/03/1963
Uttar Pradesh	Amolakh Chand	INC	
Uttar Pradesh	Bhagwat Narain Bhargava	INC	
Uttar Pradesh	Jogesh Chandra Chatterjee	INC	
Uttar Pradesh	Ram Gopal Gupta	OTH	
Uttar Pradesh	Piare Lall Kureel	OTH	
Uttar Pradesh	Prof Mukut Behari Lal	OTH	
Uttar Pradesh	Nafisul Hasan	OTH	
Uttar Pradesh	Gopal Swarup Pathak	INC	
Uttar Pradesh	Satyacharan	INC	Dea 13/08/1963
Uttar Pradesh	Mustafa Rashid Shervani	INC	
Uttar Pradesh	Hira Vallabha Tripathi	INC	
West Bengal	Rajpat Singh Doogar	INC	
West Bengal	Sudhir Ghosh	INC	
West Bengal	Abha Maity	INC	Res. 04/03/1962
West Bengal	Biren Roy	INC	
West Bengal	Mriganka M Sur	INC	

== By-elections ==
The following by-elections were held in the year 1960.

State - Member - Party

1. Andhra - D Ramanuja Rao - INC - ( ele 16/06/1960 term till 1962 )
2. Gujarat - K S Chavda - INC ( ele 01/08/1960 term till 1966 )
3. Gujarat - I T Lohani - INC ( ele 01/08/1960 term till 1964 )
4. Gujarat - Maganbhai S Patel - INC ( ele 01/08/1960 term till 1962 )
5. Maharashtra - B S Savnekar - INC ( ele 28/06/1960 term till 1966 )
6. Madras - R Gopalkrishnan - INC ( ele 12/03/1960 term till 1964 )
7. Madras - K Santhanam - INC ( ele 18/04/1960 term till 1962 )
8. Madhya Pradesh - A D Mani - INC ( ele 22/12/1960 term till 1966 )
9. Uttar Pradesh - Arjun Arora - INC ( ele 01/08/1960 term till 1966 )
10. Uttar Pradesh - A C Gilbert - INC ( ele 10/11/1960 term till 1966 )
