= 1982 Rajya Sabha elections =

Indian parliamentary elections

Rajya Sabha elections were held in 1982, to elect members of the Rajya Sabha, Indian Parliament's upper chamber.

== Elections ==
Elections were held in 1982 to elect members from various states. The list is incomplete.

=== Members elected ===
The following members are elected in the elections held in 1982. They are members for the term 1982-88 and retire in year 1982, except in case of the resignation or death before the term.

State - Member - Party

Rajya Sabha members for term 1982-1988
State	Member Name	Party	Remark
Andhra Pradesh	K L N Prasad	INC	Dea 16/07/1987
Andhra Pradesh	Adinarayan Reddy	INC	
Andhra Pradesh	S B Ramesh Babu	INC	
Andhra Pradesh	Prof B Ramchandra Rao	INC	
Andhra Pradesh	R Samba Siva Rao	INC	
Andhra Pradesh	P Babul Reddy	INC	
Bihar	Dr Mahabir Prasad	JAN	res 19/01/1985
Bihar	Ashwini Kumar	BJP	
Bihar	Pratibha Singh	INC	
Bihar	Mahendra Mohan Mishra	INC	
Bihar	Rafique Alam	INC	
Bihar	Bhishma Narain Singh	INC	res 15/04/1984
Bihar	Suraj Prasad	CPI	
Bihar	Jagdambi Prasad Yadav	BJP	
Bihar	Ramanand Yadav	INC	
GJ	Kumudben Joshi	INC	res. 25/11/1985
GJ	Yogendra Makwana	INC	
GJ	Vithalbhai M Patel	INC	
GJ	Ramsinh Rathwa	INC	
HP	Roshan Lal	INC	
HR	Hari Singh Nalwa	INC	
Jammu and Kashmir	Ghulam Rasool Matto	OTH	
Jammu and Kashmir	Dharam Chander Prashant	IND	
KA	Margaret Alva	INC	
KA	H. Hanumanthappa	INC	
KA	F M Khan	INC	
KA	V M Kushnoor	INC	
KA	M Rajagopal	INC	
Kerala	M M Jacob	INC	
Kerala	K Gopalan	OTH	
Kerala	K Mohanan	CPM	
MP	L K Advani	BJP	
MP	H. R. Bhardwaj	INC	
MP	Ratan Kumari	INC	
MP	Shrikant Verma	INC	dea 25/05/1986
MP	Keshav Prasad Shukla	INC	
MP	Radhakishan Chhotuji Malviya	INC	
MH	M C Bhandare	INC	
MH	Saroj Khaparde	INC	
MH	Suresh Kalmadi	INC	
MH	Vithalrao M Jadhav	INC	
MH	Vishvjit P. Singh	INC	
MH	Dinkarrao G Patil	INC	
Nominated	Madan Bhatia	NOM	
Nominated	Hayatulla Ansari	NOM	
Nominated	Maragatham Chandrasekhar	NOM	29/12/1984
Nominated	V N Tiwari	NOM	dea 03/04/1984
OR	Santosh Kumar Sahu	INC	
OR	Babu Banamali	INC	
OR	Gaya Chand Bhuyan	JAN	
Punjab	Amarjit Kaur	INC	
Punjab	Gurcharan Singh Tohra	SAD	
Punjab	Sat Paul Mittal	INC	
RJ	M U Arif	INC	Res.31/03/1985
RJ	Bhuvnesh Chaturvedi	INC	
RJ	Natha Singh	INC	
Uttar Pradesh	H R A Abdi	INC	
Uttar Pradesh	Bishambhar Nath Pande	INC	Res 29/06/1983
Uttar Pradesh	Sukhdev Prasad	INC	Res 16/02/1988
Uttar Pradesh	Shyam Lal Yadav	INC	29/12/1984
Uttar Pradesh	Krishna Nand Joshi	INC	
Uttar Pradesh	Shanti Tyagi	INC	
Uttar Pradesh	H R Allahabadi Abdi	INC	
Uttar Pradesh	J P Goyal	OTH	
Uttar Pradesh	Krishna Kaul	INC	
Uttar Pradesh	Ram Naresh Kushwaha	LD	
Uttar Pradesh	Dr Sankata Prasad	INC	29/12/1984
Uttar Pradesh	Ghan Shyam Singh	INC	
WB	Kalyan Roy	CPI	Dea 31/01/1985
WB	Sukomal Sen	CPM	
WB	Nirmal Chatterjee	CPM	
WB	Ramkrishna Mazumdar	FB	Dea 22/08/1987
WB	Nepaldev Bhattacharjee	CPM	

== Bye-elections ==
The following bye elections were held in the year 1982.

State - Member - Party

1. Nominated - Prof Asima Chatterjee - NOM ( ele 18/02/1982 term till 1984 )
2. Nominated - V C Ganesan - INC ( ele 18/02/1982 term till 1984 )
