= 1964 Rajya Sabha elections =

Rajya Sabha elections were held in 1964, to elect members of the Rajya Sabha, Indian Parliament's upper chamber.

== Elections ==
Elections were held in 1964 to elect members from various states. The list is incomplete.

=== Members elected ===
The following members are elected in the elections held in 1964. They are members for the term 1964-70 and retire in year 1970, except in case of the resignation or death before the term.

State - Member - Party

Rajya Sabha members for term 1964-1970
State	Member Name	Party	Remark
Andhra	N Venkateshwara Rao	INC	
Andhra Pradesh	Adinarayan Reddy	INC	
Andhra	D Sanjivayya	INC	
Andhra	Yudhvir Seeta	INC	
Andhra Pradesh	M L Mary Naidu	OTH	
Andhra Pradesh	Yella Reddy	CPI	
Assam	A Thanglura	INC	res 02/02/1967
Assam	Purnanand Chetia	INC	
Bihar	Anand Chand	INC	
Bihar	Jahanara Jaipal Singh	INC	
Bihar	Awadeshwar Prasad Sinha	INC	
Bihar	Mohammad Chaudhary A	INC	
Bihar	Braj Kishore Prasad Sinha	INC	
Bihar	Rama Bahadur Sinha	INC	
Bihar	Shishir Kumar	OTH	
Bilaspur & Himachal Pradesh	Chiranji Lal Verma	INC	
Bombay	Abid Ali	INC	
Bombay	Dahyabhai V Patel	INC	
Gujarat	Gulam H V Momin	INC	
Gujarat	Maniben Vallabhbhai Patel	OTH	
Haryana	Jagat Narain	OTH	
Jammu & Kashmir	Om Mehta	INC	
Jammu & Kashmir	Gulam M Mir	INC	res 13/03/1967
Karnataka	Mulka Govind Reddy	INC	
Kerala	K Damodaran	OTH	
Kerala	C K Govindan Nair	INC	dea 27/06/1964
Kerala	S M Sait	IND	
Madhya Pradesh	P C Sethi	INC	20/02/1967
Madhya Pradesh	Dayaldas Kurre	INC	
Madhya Pradesh	Niranjan Singh	INC	
Madhya Pradesh	Dr K C Baghel	INC	Dea. 22/02/1969
Madhya Pradesh	Giriraj Kishore Kapoor	OTH	Dea. 29/08/1965
Madhya Pradesh	Bhawani Prasad Tiwary	INC	
Maharashtra	Abid Ali	C-O	
Maharashtra	Shakarao B Bobdey	INC	
Maharashtra	Babubhai M Chinai	C-O	
Maharashtra	S K Vaishampayen	INC	
Maharashtra	Dahyabhai V. Patel	INC	
Maharashtra	Mohan Dharia	INC	
Maharashtra	Khandubhai K Desai	INC	res 31/03/1968
Maharashtra	Udhavrao S Patil	OTH	res 02/03/1967
Madras	T V Anandan	C-O	
Madras	A K A Abdul Samad	ML	
Madras	Dr S Chadrasekhar	INC	
Madras	S S Vasan	INC	dea 28/08/1969
Meghalaya	G Rajagopalan	INC	dea 16/11/1964
Mysore	M Sherkhan	INC	
Mysore	Annapurna Devi Thihmareddy	INC	
Mysore	C M Pooncha	INC	res 25/02/1967
Nominated	Jairamdas Daulatram	NOM	
Nominated	Shakuntala Paranjpye	NOM	
Nominated	Dr Badri Nath Prasad	NOM	dea 18/01/1966
Nominated	G Ramachandran	NOM	
Orissa	Binoy Kumar Mahanti	INC	
Orissa	Shankar Pratap Singh Deb	INC	dea 03/08/1965
Orissa	Narayan Patra	OTH	
Punjab	Dr Anup Singh	INC	Dea 28/01/1969
Punjab	Mohinder Kaur	INC	res 24/02/1967
Punjab	Inder Kumar Gujral	INC	
Punjab	Uttam Singh Duggal	INC	Dea 20/04/1968
Rajashtan	Sadiq Ali	INC	
Rajashtan	Devi Singh	OTH	
Rajashtan	Prof Shantilal Kothari	INC	
Tamil Nadu	A K A Abdul Samad	ML	
Tamil Nadu	T V Anandan	CO	
Tamil Nadu	S S Mariswamy	DMK	
Uttar Pradesh	F H Ansari	OTH	Dea 04/04/1966
Uttar Pradesh	Sarla Bhadauria	OTH	
Uttar Pradesh	Mahabir Prasad Bhargava	INC	
Uttar Pradesh	Indira Gandhi	INC	res 23/02/1967 4LS
Uttar Pradesh	Uma Shankar Dikshit	INC	
Uttar Pradesh	Mahavir Prasad Shukla	INC	
Uttar Pradesh	Pandit Sham Sundar Narain Tankha	INC	
Uttar Pradesh	Dattopant Thengadi	JS	
Uttar Pradesh	A C Gilbert	INC	
Uttar Pradesh	Col B H Zaidi	INC	
Uttar Pradesh	Tarkeshwar Pande	INC	res 15/12/1964
Uttar Pradesh	Sardar Ram Singh	OTH	dea 20/08/1969
West Bengal	Bhupesh Gupta	CPI	
West Bengal	Dwijendralal Sen Gupta	IND	
West Bengal	Satyendra Prosad Ray	INC	
West Bengal	M Ishaque	INC	
West Bengal	Dr Phulrenu Guha	INC	

== Bye-elections ==
The following bye elections were held in the year 1964.

State - Member - Party

1. Bihar - Lalit Narayan Mishra - INC ( ele 18/02/1964 term till 1966 )
2. Maharashtra - M C Chagla - INC ( ele 02/03/1964 term till 1966 )
3. Nagaland - Melhupra Vero - INC ( ele 18/03/1964 term till 1968 )
4. Nominated - M Amjal Khan - INC ( ele 31/03/1964 term till 1966 )
5. Madras - P Thanulingam - INC ( ele 09/07/1964 term till 1968 )
6. Rajasthan - Dalpat Singh - OTH ( ele 26/08/1964 term till 1966 )
7. Andhra - Neelam Sanjiva Reddy - INC ( ele 20/11/1964 term till 1966 )
8. Nominated - Prof Siddhantalankar Satyavrata - NOM ( ele 25/11/1964 term till 1968 )
