= 1962 Rajya Sabha elections =

Elections for the Upper House of Indian Parliament

(of 228 seats) to the Rajya Sabha
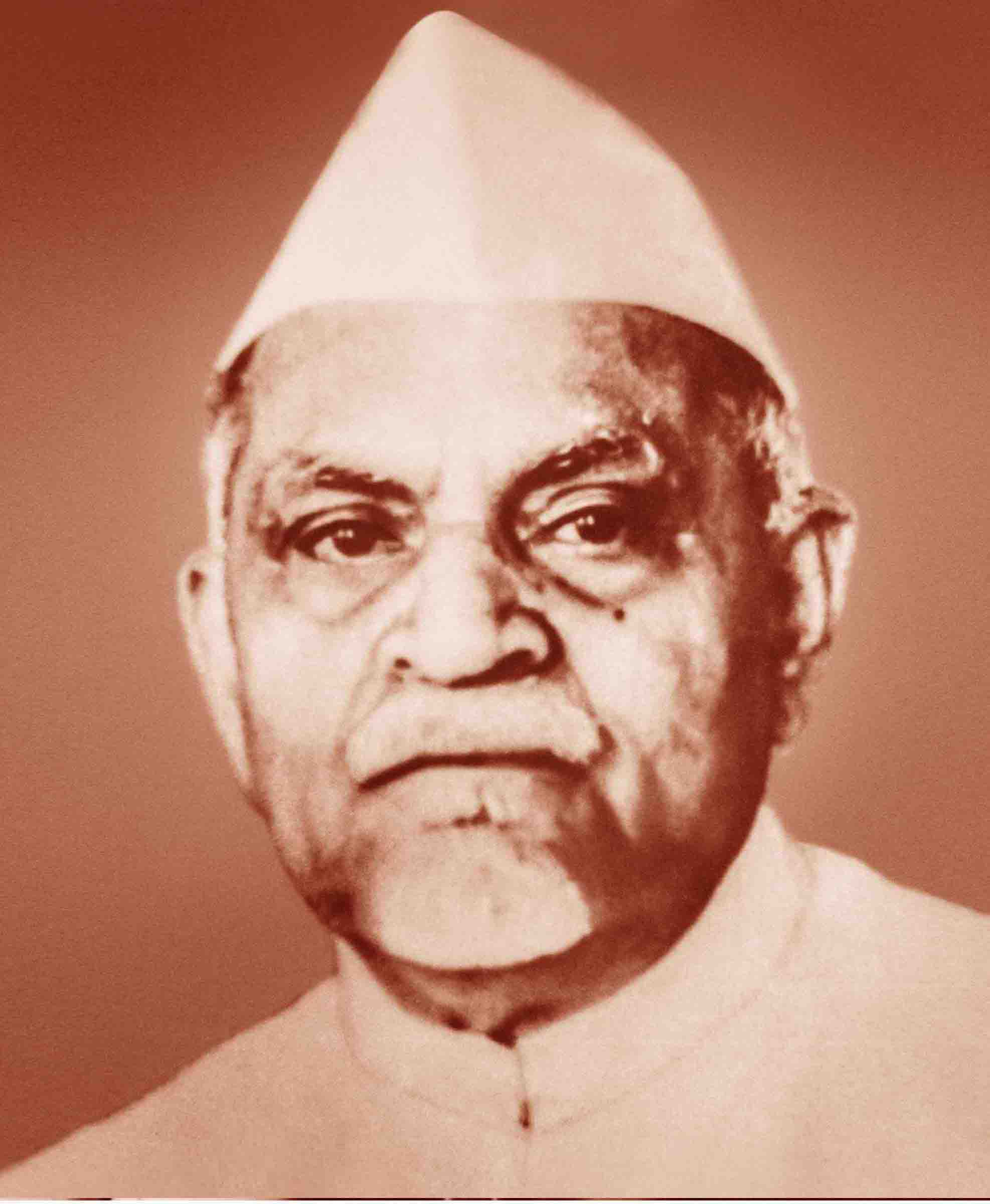
	First party
Leader	Hafiz Mohammad Ibrahim
Party	INC

Rajya Sabha elections were held in 1962 to elect members of the Rajya Sabha, Indian Parliament's upper chamber.

== Elections ==
Elections were held in 1962 to elect members from various states. The list is incomplete.

=== Members elected ===
The following members were elected in the elections held in 1962. They were members for the term 1962-68 and retired in year 1968, except in case of the resignation or death before the term.

State - Member - Party

Rajya Sabha members for term 1962-1968
State	Member Name	Party	Remark
Ajmer & Coorg	Abdul Shakoor Maulana	INC	
Andhra	C Ammanna Raja	INC	R
Andhra	P K Kumaran	CPI	
Andhra	V C Keshava Rao	INC	res. 14/03/1967
Andhra	K. V. Raghunatha Reddy	INC	
Andhra	K Vengala Reddy	INC	
Andhra	N Narotham Reddy	INC	
Assam	Baharul Islam	INC	
Assam	Robin Kakati	INC	
Bihar	Mahabir Dass	INC	R
Bihar	Dhirendra Chandra Mallik	INC	
Bihar	J K P N Singh	INC	
Bihar	Ganga Sharan Sinha	OTH	
Bihar	Dr Mahmud Syed	INC	
Bihar	B B Verma	INC	
Delhi	Sardar Santokh Singh	INC	
Gujarat	Jaisukh Lal Hathi	INC	
Gujarat	Maganbhai S Patel	INC	dea. 16/04/1967
Gujarat	Maneklal C Shah	INC	res. 13/03/1967
Himachal Pradesh	Shiva Nand Ramaul	INC	
Kerala	Devaki Gopidas	INC	
Kerala	Palat Kunhi Koya	INC	
Kerala	M N Govindan Nair	CPI	res. 03/03/1967 4LS
Madras	C. N. Annadurai	DMK	Res. 25/02/1967
Madras	M J Jamal Moideen	INC	
Madras	M A M Naicker	INC	Res. 15/04/1964
Madras	J S Pillai	INC	
Madras	K S Ramaswami	INC	
Madras	M Ruthnaswamy	OTH	
Madhya Pradesh	V M Chordia	JS	
Madhya Pradesh	Mahant Laxmi Narain Das	OTH	
Madhya Pradesh	Rameshchandra S Khandekar	OTH	
Madhya Pradesh	Ram Sahai	INC	
Madhya Pradesh	Ahmad Syed	INC	
Maharashtra	M. C. Chagla	INC	Res. 17/04/1962
Maharashtra	Bhaurao K Gaikwad	INC	
Maharashtra	Pandharinath Sitaramji Patil	INC	
Maharashtra	D Y Pawar	INC	
Maharashtra	Tara R Sathe	INC	
Maharashtra	Ganpatrao D Tapase	INC	
Mysore	Dr N. S. Hardikar	INC	
Mysore	D. P. Karmarkar	INC	
Mysore	Puttappa Patil	OTH	
Mysore	M Govinda Reddy	INC	
Mysore	J Ventakappa	OTH	
Nominated	R. R. Diwakar	NOM	
Nominated	Dr Gopal Singh	NOM	
Nominated	Dr Tara Chand	NOM	
Nominated	Dr B M Warekar	NOM	Dea 23/09/1964
Orissa	Manmathnath Misra	INC	
Orissa	Sudarmani Patel	INC	
Orissa	Nandini Satpathy	INC	
Punjab	Dr Anup Singh	INC	Disq. 22/11/1962
Punjab	Surjit Singh Atwal	INC	
Punjab	Chaman Lall Diwan	INC	
Rajasthan	Abdul Shakoor Maulana	INC	
Rajashtan	Sharda Bhargava	INC	
Rajashtan	P N Kathju	INC	
Rajashtan	Sawai Man Singh	INC	Res. 08/11/1965
Rajashtan	Ramesh Chandra Vyas	INC	22/02/1967
Tripura	Tarit Mohan Dasgupta	OTH	Res. 02/03/1967
Uttar Pradesh	Lila Dhar Asthana	INC	
Uttar Pradesh	Chandra Shekhar	OTH	
Uttar Pradesh	Dr Dharam Prakash	INC	
Uttar Pradesh	Hafiz Muhammad Ibrahim	INC	res 04/05/1964
Uttar Pradesh	Sitaram Jaipuria	INC	
Uttar Pradesh	Anis Kidwai	INC	
Uttar Pradesh	Godey Murahari	OTH	
Uttar Pradesh	Uma Nehru	OTH	Dea 28/08/1963
Uttar Pradesh	Mohan Singh Oberoi	OTH	04/03/1968
Uttar Pradesh	C D Pande	INC	
Uttar Pradesh	Har Prasad Saksena	INC	
Uttar Pradesh	Prakash Narayan Sapru	INC	
Uttar Pradesh	Dr M M S Siddhu	INC	
Uttar Pradesh	Atal Bihari Vajpayee	JS	res 25/02/1967
West Bengal	Surendra Mohan Ghose	INC	
West Bengal	Niren Ghosh	INC	
West Bengal	Nausher Ali Syed	INC	
West Bengal	Dr Nihar Ranjan Ray	INC	res 01/06/1965
West Bengal	Ram Prasanna Ray	INC	
West Bengal	Pannalal Saraogi	INC	dea 06/08/1963

== Bye-elections ==
The following bye elections were held in the year 1962.

State - Member - Party

1. Orissa - Satyanand Mishra - INC ( ele 07/04/1962 term till 1964 )
2. Rajasthan - Nemi chand Kasliwal - INC ( ele 07/04/1962 term till 1964 )
3. Delhi - Sardar Santosh Singh - INC ( ele 16/04/1962 term till 1968 )
4. Jammu and Kashmir - A M Tariq - INC ( ele 16/04/1962 term till 1966 res 04/03/1965)
5. Madras - K Santhanam - INC ( ele 17/04/1962 term till 1964 )
6. Uttar Pradesh - Krishna Chand- INC ( ele 19/04/1962 term till 1964 )
7. Uttar Pradesh - Dr Jawaharlal Rohtagi - INC ( ele 19/04/1962 term till 1964 )
8. Uttar Pradesh - Mahavir Prasad Shukla - INC ( ele 19/04/1962 term till 1964 )
9. West Bengal - Nikunj Behari Maiti - INC ( ele 25/04/1962 term till 1968 )
10. Punjab - Abdul Ghani Dar - INC ( ele 16/06/1962 term till 1968 ) res 23/02/1967 4LS
11. Assam - A Thanglura - INC ( ele 20/06/1962 term till 1964 )
12. Andhra - B Ramakrishna Rao - INC ( ele 21/06/1962 term till 1966 )
13. Maharashtra - Bidesh T Kulkarni - INC ( ele 05/07/1962 term till 1968 )
14. Bihar - Shyamnandan Mishra - INC ( ele 04/12/1962 term till 1966 )
