= Shivesh Kumar =

Indian politician (born 1957)

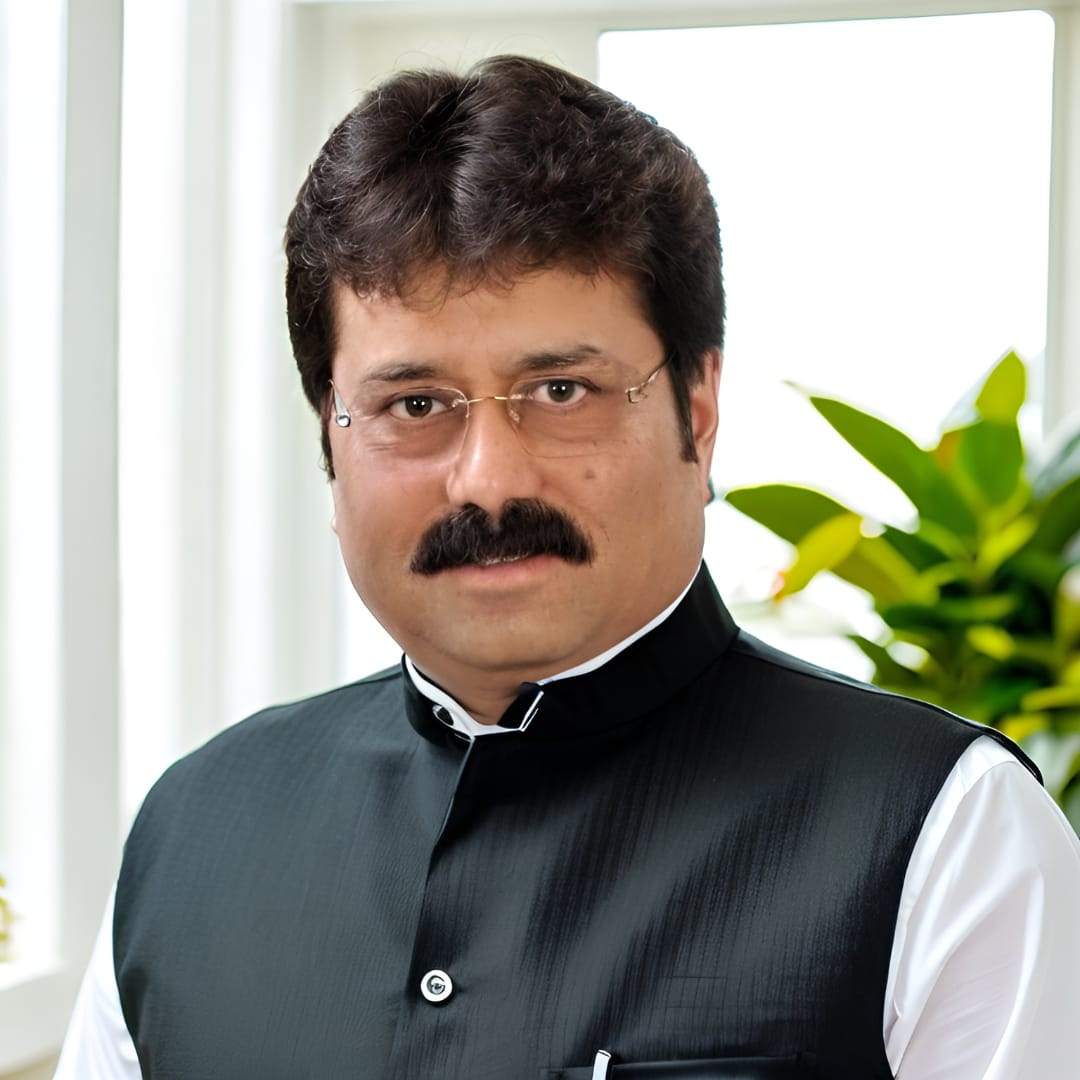

National President of Bharatiya Janata Party SC Morcha
- Incumbent
- Assumed office 17 August 2026
- Appointed by: Nitin Nabin
- Preceded by: Lal Singh Arya

Member of Parliament, Rajya Sabha
- Incumbent
- Assumed office 10 April 2026
- Preceded by: Amarendra Dhari Singh
- Constituency: Bihar

Member of Bihar Legislative Assembly
- In office 2010–2015
- Preceded by: Constituency established
- Succeeded by: Prabhunath Prasad
- Constituency: Agiaon

Personal details
- Born: 3 October 1967 (age 58) Bhojpur, Bihar, India
- Party: Bharatiya Janata Party
- Parent: Muni Lall
- Education: MBA
- Occupation: Politician

Shivesh Kumar (born 3 October 1967), also known as Shivesh Ram, is an Indian politician serving as an MP in the Rajya Sabha from Bihar as a member of the Bharatiya Janata Party. He is a former member of the Legislative Assembly (MLA), who was elected in the 2010 state general election representing the Agiaon constituency on a Bharatiya Janata Party ticket.

== Early life ==
He was born on 3 October 1967 in Bhojpur, Bihar. He graduated (B.A) from Ranchi University and later completed his masters (M.BA) form Bihar University.

== Organizational Responsibilities ==
1. Active member of Rashtriya Swayamsevak Sangh (RSS) since childhood.
2. Member of district 20 points Committee, Bhojpur, Bihar (2006-2010).
3. Member of Legislative Assembly (MLA), Agaion Bihar (2010-2015).
4. Member of Scheduled Cast & Scheduled Tribe Committee Bihar Vidhan Sabha (2010-2015).
5. State Secretary, Bhartiya Janata Party (2010-2016).
6. State Vice President, Bhartiya Janata Party (2017-2020).

== Honorary Members & Hobbies ==
- Lifetime Member of Jharkhand State Cricket Association.
- Lifetime Member of Bihar Cricket Association.
- Lifetime Member of Rible Association of Bihar.
- Was an active cricket player at state level in Bihar.
