= Kahkashan Perween =

Indian politician

MP of Rajya Sabha for Bihar
- In office 10 April 2014 – 10 April 2020
- Preceded by: Shivanand Tiwari
- Succeeded by: Prem Chand Gupta
- Constituency: Bihar

Personal details
- Born: 1 January 1979 (age 47) Doranda, Ranchi district, Jharkhand
- Party: Janata Dal (United)
- Spouse: Md. Nasimuddin
- Children: 2 daughters
- Education: B.A. Educated at Ranchi Women's College
- Profession: Political and Social Worker

Kahkashan Perween (born 1 January 1979) is an Indian politician from Janata Dal (United). She served as a Member of the Parliament of India representing Bihar in the Rajya Sabha, the upper house of the Parliament.

She graduated from Ranchi Women's College in 1991 and has resided in Bhagalpur since her marriage. From 2002 to 2007, she was the Mayor of Bhagalpur Municipal Corporation. Rajya Sabha Chairman M. Venkaiah Naidu nominated Parveen to the panel of presiding officers for conducting proceedings of the House on 27 July 2018. She was elected for a 6-year term which spanned from April 2014 to April 2020.
