= Shambhu Sharan Patel =

Member of Indian parliament (Rajya Sabha)

Member of Parliament, Rajya Sabha
- Incumbent
- Assumed office 8 July 2022
- Preceded by: Gopal Narayan Singh
- Constituency: Bihar

Personal details
- Born: Chhathiyara, Sheikhpura, Bihar
- Party: Bharatiya Janata Party

Shambhu Sharan Patel is an Indian politician who is serving as a Member of the Rajya Sabha from Bihar since May 29, 2022 representing the Bharatiya Janata Party.
