= Dharamchand =

Dharamchand is an Indian masculine given name. Notable people with the name include:

- Dharamchand Chordia (1949 or 1950–2021), Indian politician
- Dharamchand Jain (1935–1995), Indian politician
- Jagdish Koonjul (born 1952), Mauritian politician
