= Purna Chandra Mitra =

Indian politician

Member of Parliament, Rajya Sabha
- In office 1952-1959
- Preceded by: established
- Succeeded by: Rajeshwar Prasad Narain Sinha
- Constituency: Bihar

Member of Bihar Legislative Assembly
- In office 1937-1952
- Preceded by: established
- Succeeded by: abolished
- Constituency: Khunti

Personal details
- Born: 11 August 1877
- Died: 24 August 1959 (aged 82)
- Party: Indian National Congress
- Children: 14 (incl. Pratul Chandra Mitra)

Purna Chandra Mitra was an Indian politician . He was a Member of Parliament, representing Bihar in the Rajya Sabha the upper house of India's Parliament as a member of the Indian National Congress.
