= Janardan Yadav =

Indian politician

Member of Parliament, Rajya Sabha
- In office 10 April 1994 – 9 April 2000
- Succeeded by: Ravi Shankar Prasad
- Constituency: Bihar

Member of Parliament, Lok Sabha
- In office 1989–1991
- Preceded by: Saminuddin
- Succeeded by: Suraj Mandal
- Constituency: Godda

Member of Bihar Legislative Assembly
- In office 1986–1990
- Preceded by: Chandrashekhar Singh
- Succeeded by: Ramnarayan Mandal
- Constituency: Banka
- In office 1972–1980
- Preceded by: Sukhnarain Singh
- Succeeded by: Neel Mohan Singh
- Constituency: Amarpur

Personal details
- Born: 5 November 1942 (age 83) Telia Naugai, Bhagalpur District, Bihar, British India
- Party: Bharatiya Janata Party
- Spouse: Savitri Devi (m. 1954)

Janardan Yadav is an Indian politician. He was elected to the Lok Sabha, lower house of the Parliament of India from Godda, Jharkhand as a member of the Bharatiya Janata Party .
