= Suraj Mandal =

Indian politician

Member of Lok Sabha
- In office 1991–1996
- Preceded by: Janardan Yadav
- Succeeded by: Jagdambi Prasad Yadav
- Constituency: Godda, Jharkhand

Personal details
- Born: Suraj Mandal; 2 February 1949 (age 77) Dewal Bari, Santhal Pargana district, Bihar
- Party: Bharatiya Janata Party
- Other political affiliations: Indian National Congress; Jharkhand Mukti Morcha; Jharkhand Vikas Dal
- Spouse: Shobha Devi
- Children: Two sons and two daughters
- Education: University of Delhi
- Occupation: Agriculture and Railway Service

Suraj Mandal (born 2 February 1949) is an Indian politician and a member of the 10th Lok Sabha. Mandal was elected to the Lok Sabha, the lower house of the Parliament of India from Godda, Bihar in the 1991 Indian general election as a member of the Jharkhand Mukti Morcha by defeating a sitting member of Bharatiya Janata Party leader Janardan Yadav. Mandal was MLA in Bihar Vidhan Sabha from 1980 to 1991.

Mandal was named in the cash-for-vote controversy over a no-trust motion during P V Narasimha Rao’s tenure in 1993. He left Jharkhand Mukti Morcha in and formed Jharkhand Vikas Dal.
