= Prabhu Dayal Himatsingka =

Indian politician

Member of Parliament, Lok Sabha
- In office 1962-1971
- Succeeded by: Jagdish Mandal
- Constituency: Godda, Bihar

Personal details
- Born: 16 August 1889 Dumka, British India
- Died: 2 June 1991 (aged 101)
- Party: Indian National Congress

Prabhu Dayal Himatsingka (16 August 1889 – 2 June 1991) was an Indian politician. He was elected to the Lok Sabha, the lower house of the Parliament of India, from Godda, Bihar as a member of the Indian National Congress. He was 101 years old when he died in June 1991.
