= Jagdish Mandal =

Indian politician

Member of Parliament, Lok Sabha
- In office 1971-1977
- Preceded by: Prabhu Dayal Himatsingka
- Succeeded by: Jagdambi Prasad Yadav
- Constituency: Godda, Bihar

Personal details
- Born: 14 December 1917 Baksara, Bihar, British India
- Died: 10 February 2002 (aged 84)
- Party: Indian National Congress

Jagdish Narain Mandal (1917–2002) was an Indian politician. He was elected to the Lok Sabha, lower house of the Parliament of India from Godda, Bihar as a member of the Indian National Congress.
