= Ram Lakhan Prasad Gupta =

Indian politician

Member of Parliament, Rajya Sabha
- In office 10 April 1978 – 9 April 1984
- Constituency: Bihar

Member of Bihar Legislative Council
- In office 1970–1978

President of Bharatiya Jana Sangh, Bihar
- In office 1973–1975

Personal details
- Died: 30 January 1985
- Spouse: Sarla Gupta
- Children: 4 sons, 2 daughters
- Parent: Tanuk Lal Shah (father)
- Education: M.A., LLB

Ram Lakhan Prasad Gupta (1926–1985) was a leader of Bharatiya Janata Party from Bihar. He was a member of Rajya Sabha for the periods of 1970 -76 and 1978–84. He was also a member of Bihar Legislative Council and served as state president of Bihar unit of Bharatiya Jan Sangh.
