= 1973 Rajya Sabha elections =

Elections for the Upper House of Indian Parliament

Rajya Sabha elections were held on various dates in 1973, to elect members of the Rajya Sabha, Indian Parliament's upper chamber.

== Elections ==
Elections were held to elect members from various states.

=== Members elected ===
The following members are elected in the elections held in 1973. They are members for the term 1973-1979 and retire in year 1979, except in case of the resignation or death before the term. The list is incomplete.

Rajya Sabha members for term 1973-1979
State	Member Name	Party	Remark
Kerala	P K Kunjachen	CPM	
Kerala	H A Schamnad	IND	
Kerala	Dr V A Seyid Muhammad	INC	21/03/1977

== By-elections ==
The following by-elections were held in the year 1973.

State	Member	Party	Election Date	Term ending in
Gujarat	Yogendra Makwana	Indian National Congress	3 May 1973	1976
Odisha	Debananda Amat	Indian National Congress	6 March 1973	1974
Bihar	Aziza Imam	Indian National Congress	20 March 1973	1976
Bihar	Kamal Nath Jha	Indian National Congress	20 March 1973	1974
Assam	D. K. Barooah	Indian National Congress	19 July 1973	1974
Gujarat	Kumudben Joshi	Indian National Congress	15 October 1973	1976
Uttar Pradesh	Kamalapati Tripathi	Indian National Congress	11 December 1973	1978
