= Faguni Ram =

Indian politician (1945–2018)

Dr. Faguni Ram
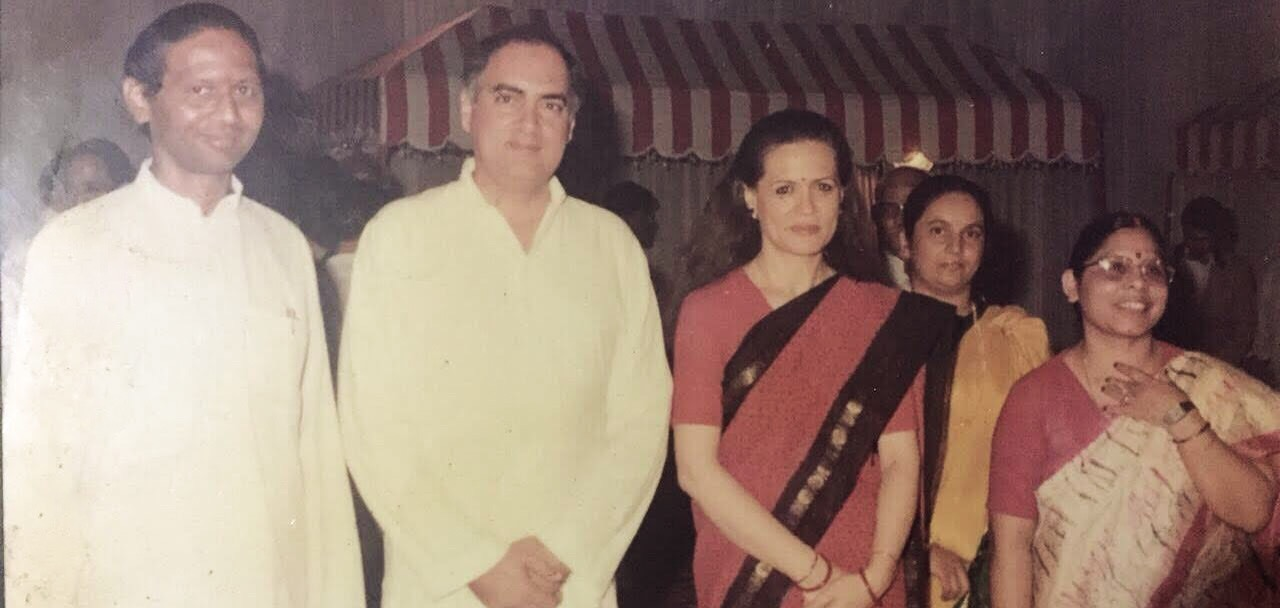
- Dr. Faguni Ram and Dr. Sushila Das photographed with Prime Minister Rajiv Gandhi and Shrimati Sonia Gandhi

Member of Parliament, Rajya Sabha
- In office 2000 - 2006
- Succeeded by: Mahendra Sahani
- Constituency: Aurangabad, Bihar

Member of the Bihar Legislative Assembly
- In office 1972–1977
- Preceded by: Sahdeo Choudhary
- Succeeded by: Md. Hussain Ansari
- Constituency: Rafiganj

Personal details
- Born: 2 January 1945 Gaya Bihar
- Died: 25 February 2018 (aged 73) New Delhi
- Party: Indian National Congress
- Spouse: Dr. Sushila Das

Dr. Faguni Ram (2 January 1945 – 25 February 2018) was an Indian politician. He was a minister of state, Bihar and member of the Rajya Sabha, the upper house of the Parliament of India representing Bihar as a member of the Indian National Congress for three terms. He worked in the core group of then Prime Minister, Sh. Rajiv Gandhi. Dr. Ram and Dr. Das considered Prime Minister Shri Rajiv Gandhi as their older brother.

Dr. Faguni Ram, whose father was Baijnath Ram (Freedom Fighter), was born on 2 January 1945. He obtained BA and MA degrees in Geography, as well as a PhD. He earned an additional Masters in Sanskrit. Dr. Ram married Dr. Sushila Das.

Ram was a member of the Legislative Assembly of Bihar between 1972–77 and served as a minister of state in the Government of Bihar in 1973. He was a member of the Rajya Sabha from 1985–1988, 1988–1994 and from 2000.

Outside politics, Ram wrote Development of Irrigation and its Impact on Agriculture and was a co-author of the 25 volumes of Instant Encyclopaedia of Geography. He was an accomplished calligrapher and folk singer in Magahi language.

He and his wife were among the first members of a Scheduled Caste in the state to hold a PhD degree. They always stressed education as a means to self-development and the development of people they served. He served in Bihar State Administrative Services but left to become MLA from Aurangabad.

Ram breathed last on 25 February 2018 in Ram Manohar Lohia hospital. He was cremated in Nigambodh Ghat.

== Awards and recognition ==
- National Integration Award, 1987–88
- Citizen of India, 1992
- Several colleges and schools named after him in his hometown and state.
