= Gaya Singh =

Indian Politician

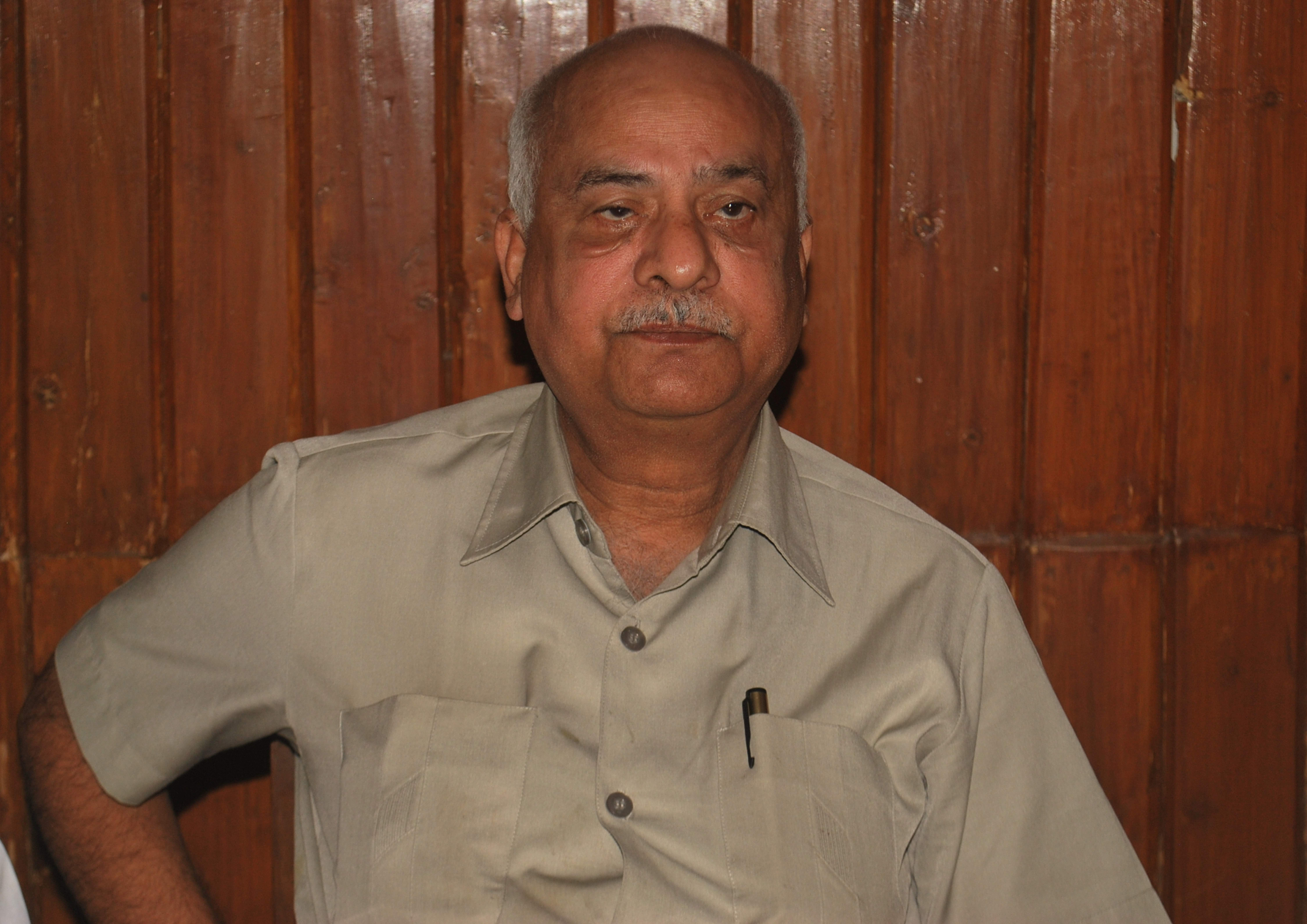
- Veteran trade union leader and former CPI MP Gaya Singh

Member of Parliament, Rajya Sabha
- In office 8 July 1992 – 7 July 1998
- In office 8 July 1998 – 7 July 2004
- Constituency: Bihar

Personal details
- Born: 1943 PILLICH, Nalanda District, Bihar
- Died: 7 October 2017 Patna
- Party: Communist Party of India

Gaya Singh (1943 – 7 October 2017) was an Indian Communist leader, an organiser of working class and a parliamentarian.

== Life ==
Com. Gaya Singh entered politics as a student leader in late 60s and became the general secretary of AISF in Bihar and one of the national secretaries of AISF. He later worked as an organiser of working class and became the National President of AITUC. He was a leader of Bihar unit of the Communist Party of India. He even worked as one of the national level secretaries of CPI. He served as a member of Rajya Sabha twice (from 8 July 1992 to 7 July 1998 and 8 July 1998 to 7 July 2004).
