= Ashwani Kumar (Bihar politician) =

Indian politician

President of Bharatiya Janata Party, Bihar
- In office 1994–1996
- Preceded by: Tarakant Jha
- Succeeded by: Yashwant Sinha

Member of Parliament, Rajya Sabha
- In office 7 July 1980 – 6 July 1992
- Succeeded by: Parmeshwar Kumar Agarwalla
- Constituency: Bihar

Personal details
- Born: 18 November 1928 Uttar Pradesh, British India
- Died: 4 February 2012 (aged 83) Lucknow, Uttar Pradesh, India
- Party: Bharatiya Janata Party
- Parent: Shanti Swaroop Jalota (father)
- Education: B.Sc (Industrial Chemistry)

Ashwani Kumar (1928–2012) was a politician from Bihar state of India and was a leader of Bharatiya Janata Party. He was a two-term member of Rajya Sabha from 1980 to 1992. He had also served as the State President of the Bharatiya Janata Party, Bihar.

== Early life and political career ==
Kumar was born in Uttar Pradesh on 18 November 1928. Ashwini Kumar had his primary education from Gorakhpur and then had graduate degree in chemical engineering from Banaras Hindu University. After completing education he became a Sangh Pracharak and worked in Basti, Ballia and Jaunpur districts in different capacities. Later, he joined active politics as an activist of Bihar Pradesh Jan Sangh and held various responsibilities in Bihar. He was the organising secretary of the Bharatiya Jana Sangh from 1965 to 1970. He became the general secretary of the Bharatiya Janata Party, Bihar in 1980 and was elected to Rajya Sabha twice from Bihar in 1980 and 1986. In 1994 he replaced Tarakant Jha as the state president of BJP Bihar. He died on 4 February 2012 in Lucknow.
