= Pranab Chatterjee =

Indian politician

Member of Parliament, Rajya Sabha
- In office 1978-1979
- Constituency: Bihar

Personal details
- Born: 15 July 1929
- Died: c. 9 July 1979
- Party: Janata Party

Pranab Chatterjee (1929–1979) was an Indian politician. He was a Member of Parliament, representing Bihar in the Rajya Sabha the upper house of India's Parliament as a member of the Janata Party.
