= Gopal Narayan Singh =

Indian politician

Member of Parliament, Rajya Sabha
- In office 8 July 2016 – 2 April 2022
- Preceded by: K. C. Tyagi
- Constituency: Bihar

President of Bharatiya Janata Party, Bihar
- In office 16 October 2003 – 31 May 2005
- Preceded by: Nand Kishore Yadav
- Succeeded by: Sushil Kumar Modi

Member of Bihar Legislative Assembly
- In office 1977–1980
- Preceded by: Jagdish Ojha
- Succeeded by: Jangi Singh Choudhary
- Constituency: Nokha

Personal details
- Born: 1 January 1943 (age 83) Jamuhar, Bihar, British India
- Party: Bharatiya Janata Party
- Spouse: Shail Singh (m. 1966)
- Children: 2 sons & 5 daughters
- Parents: Deo Narayan Singh (father); Mangala Devi (mother)
- Education: M. A. (Economics)
- Alma mater: University of Allahabad
- Profession: Agriculturist, Politician
- As of 24 February, 2022

Gopal Narayan Singh is an Indian politician from the state of Bihar belonging to the Bharatiya Janata Party.

In June 2016, he was the candidate for the Rajya Sabha biennial elections for the lone seat that was to be won by BJP. He was elected unopposed on 3 June 2016.
