= Kazi Ahmad Hussain =

Indian politician (1889–1961)

Member of Bihar Legislative Council
- In office 1923–1928

Member of Rajya Sabha
- In office 1952–1958
- In office 1958–1961

Personal details
- Born: 1889
- Died: 14 August 1961 (aged 71–72)
- Party: Indian National Congress
- Spouse: Bibi Chanda
- Parent: Qazi Syed Lateef Hussain (father)

Kazi Ahmad Hussain (1889 – 14 August 1961) was an Indian politician of the Indian National Congress. He was a Member of Bihar Legislative Council from 1923 to 1928 and a two-time Member of Rajya Sabha (the upper house of the Parliament of India) from 1952 to 1958 and 1958 to 1961.

== Personal life ==
Ahmad Hussain was born in Konibar village of Nawadah District. Qazi Syed Lateef Hussain was his father.

Ahmad Hussain married Bibi Chanda in 1923.

He died on 14 August 1961.
