= Aziza Fatima Imam =

Indian politician

Aziza Imam

Member of Parliament, Rajya Sabha
- In office 1973-1982
- Constituency: Bihar

Personal details
- Born: 20 February 1924
- Died: July 23, 1996 (aged 72)
- Party: Indian National Congress (U)
- Other political affiliations: Indian National Congress
- Spouse: Syed Naqui Imam
- Relations: Muhammad Shafi Daudi (paternal uncle); Anis Imam (maternal aunt); Syed Ali Imam (wife of Anis Imam); Colonel Mahboob Ahmad (brother)
- Parent(s): Syed Wali Ahmed (father); Khadija Ahmed (mother)

Begum Aziza Fatima Imam was an Indian politician and social activist who was elected as Member of Rajya Sabha in 1973 and 1979. She was adopted by her maternal uncle Syed Ali Imam and her wife Begum Anis Fatima Imam, who was Aziza's Maternal aunt.
