= 1979 Rajya Sabha elections =

Upper house elections to the Indian parliament

Rajya Sabha elections were held on various dates in 1979, to elect members of the Rajya Sabha, Indian Parliament's upper chamber.

== Elections ==
Elections were held to elect members from various states.

=== Members elected ===
The following members are elected in the elections held in 1979. They are members for the term 1979-1985 and retire in year 1985, except in case of the resignation or death before the term. The list is incomplete.

State - Member - Party

Rajya Sabha members for term 1979-1985
State	Member Name	Party	Remark
Kerala	Thalekkunnil Basheer	INC	29/12/1984
Kerala	K Chathunni Master	CPM	
Kerala	K C Sebastian	INC	

== Bye-elections ==
The following bye elections were held in the year 1979.

State - Member - Party

1. Bihar - Syed Shahabuddin - JAN ( ele 25/07/1979 term till 1984 )
2. Bihar - Brahmdeo Ram Shastri - JAN ( ele 25/07/1979 term till 1980 )
