= Gyan Ranjan =

Indian politician

Member of Parliament, Rajya Sabha
- In office 1996–1998
- Constituency: Bihar

Personal details
- Born: 15 October 1947
- Died: 22 May 1998 (aged 50) Ranchi
- Party: Indian National Congress
- Spouse: Bibha Ranjan
- Children: 1 (Vigya Smirti)

Gyan Ranjan was an Indian politician. He was a Member of Parliament, representing Bihar in the Rajya Sabha, the upper house of India's Parliament, representing the Indian National Congress.
