= Mohammad Aas =

Indian politician

Member of Rajya Sabha
- In office 3 April 1994 – 2 April 2000
- Constituency: Bihar

Personal details
- Born: Mohammad Aas
- Party: Janata Dal United
- Other political affiliations: Janata Dal

Mohammad Aas is an Indian politician. He was a Member of Parliament, representing Bihar in the Rajya Sabha the upper house of India's Parliament as a member of the Janata Dal later Janata Dal United.
