= Rajni Ranjan Sahu =

Indian politician

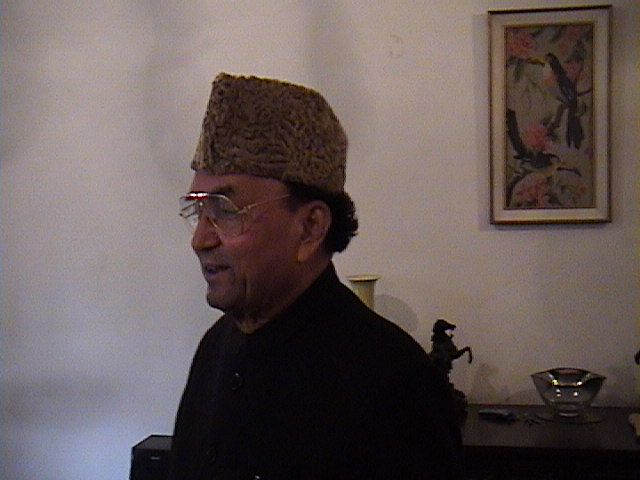

Rajni Ranjan Sahu (born 1934) is a former member of parliament (MP) in India. He represented the state of Bihar in Rajya Sabha (upper chamber of parliament) for two six-year terms (1984–1996) as a member of the Congress party (I).

Sahu was heavily influenced by Mahatma Gandhi from childhood as he had attended primary school in an Ashram in Champaran, which was founded by Gandhi. Also, he grew up in a family of freedom fighters, (Two Uncles Dhwaja Prasad Sahu and Rajkishor Prasad Sahu) who embraced the ethos of the struggle for independence through non-violent means; the movement was led by the Indian National Congress under Gandhi’s leadership. During his teen and early adult years, Sahu was also influenced by his older brother, Shashi Ranjan Sahu, a trade unionist in Bihar belonging to the Congress party who was elected twice (in 1962 and 1967) to the lower house of parliament.

Sahu started his career as an advocate, agriculturalist, and social worker. As a college student (in 1952-1953), he organized the All India Students and Youth Conference in Ranchi (Bihar) to foster the ideals of the Bhoodan Movement, which was launched by Acharya Vinoba Bhave. A decade later, he joined the Congress party and made a foray into national politics in 1977 by joining Mrs. Indira Gandhi and her supporters to court arrest in the Jail Bharo Andolan. Thereafter, he worked tirelessly for the Congress party organization. Though he was unsuccessful in 1979 in contesting the Lok Sabha seat from the Muzaffarpur constituency against George Fernandes, the then Janata Party Industry Minister, Sahu went on to hold important party and other public positions in his home state of Bihar—Director of India Tourism Development Corporation (1981-1983), Chair of Bihar State Credit and Investment Corporation Limited, Patna (1982-1985), and Treasurer, Bihar Pradesh Congress Committee (1985-1991). He served as the Congress party observer for over a dozen states between 1984-1994 and as the Pradesh Returning Officer for organizing the Congress party elections for three states (Andhra Pradesh, Pondicherry and Tamil Nadu).

Sahu served with distinction for 12 years in parliament. During his tenure in Rajya Sabha, he held important leadership positions. He chaired several committees, including the Committee on Petitions (1988–1990), House Committee (1991-1994), and Joint Committee of Parliament for Home, Law, and Justice. Under his leadership, the Committee on Petitions produced numerous reports, notably the Report on Procedure Relating to the Grant of Pension to the Freedom Fighters, reports on ground rent of the land allotted to the schools of Chandigarh, reports on the entire policy of allotment of L.P.G. Dealership to the economically weaker section of the society and scheduled castes, reports on policy regarding medical reimbursement to the employees of I.T.D.C. and other public sector undertaking, and reports on a minimum price for LAC. He also served on the Executive Committee of the Congress Parliamentary Party (1986-1988) and on the Committee on Energy, Salary, and Allowances. He was a member of the Indian Delegation to the UN General Assembly (1991), and over the years he participated in (a) parliamentary delegations to several countries, including Venezuela, Mauritius, Canada, China, Hong Kong, and Bangkok and (b) Congress party delegations to Bulgaria, U.K., and U.S.A.

R.R. Sahu is retired from active politics. He lives in Dwarka, Delhi.
