= Rudra Narain Jha =

Indian politician

Member of Parliament, Rajya Sabha
- In office 1968-1971
- Constituency: Bihar

Personal details
- Born: 20 December 1925
- Died: May 24, 1971 (aged 45)
- Party: Samyukta Socialist Party
- Spouse: Kunti Devi

Rudra Narain Jha (1925-1971) was an Indian politician. He was a Member of Parliament, representing Bihar in the Rajya Sabha, the upper house of India's Parliament, as a member of the Samyukta Socialist Party.
