= Manorama Pandey =

Indian politician (born 1932)

Member of Parliament, Rajya Sabha
- In office 1958–1970, 1972–1978
- Constituency: Bihar

Personal details
- Born: 31 May 1932 (age 94) Buxar
- Party: Indian National Congress

Manorama Pandey (born 31 May 1932) is an Indian politician. She was a Member of Parliament, representing Bihar in the Rajya Sabha the upper house of India's Parliament as a member of the Indian National Congress.
