= Braja Kishore Prasad Sinha =

Indian politician

Member of Parliament, Rajya Sabha
- In office 1952–1970
- Constituency: Bihar

Personal details
- Born: 21 January 1909
- Died: 26 February 1996 (aged 87)
- Party: Indian National Congress
- Spouse: Shiwa Kishori Sinha

Braja Kishore Prasad Sinha (1909-1996) was an Indian politician. He was a Member of Parliament, representing Bihar in the Rajya Sabha, the upper house of India's Parliament. He was also a member of the Constituent Assembly of India.
