= Balkrishna Gupta =

Indian politician

Member of Parliament, Rajya Sabha
- In office 1968-1972
- Constituency: Bihar

Personal details
- Born: 5 March 1910
- Died: 10 September 1972 (aged 62)
- Party: Socialist Party

Balkrishna Gupta (5 March 1910 – 10 September 1972) was an Indian politician. He was a Member of Parliament, representing Bihar in the Rajya Sabha the upper house of India's Parliament as a member of the Socialist Party.

He earned his degree of Bachelor of Science from London School of Economics. Later, after he returned back to India, he was editor of Ram Manohar Lohia's Hindi journal Jan.

== Parliamentary debates ==
- Gupta, Balkrishna (31 May 1952). "THE DISPLACED PERSONS (CLAIMS) AMENDMENT BILL". rsdebate.nic.in.
- Gupta, Balkrishna (23 February 1953). "U.N. Mission's Tour of Community Project Areas". rsdebate.nic.in.
- Gupta, Balkrishna (23 Feb, 1953), U.N. Mission's Tour of Community Project Areas, Rajya Sabha Debate, RSdebate.nic.in
- Gupta, Balkrishna (23 Feb, 1953), Breach of Law in French Indian Territory, Rajya Sabha Debate, RSdebate.nic.in
- Gupta, Balkrishna (29 APRIL, 1954), Traffic Jam on Air Force Display Day, Rajya Sabha Debate, RSdebate.nic.in
- Gupta, Balkrishna (1 December 1954),DISCLOSURE OF THE NAMES OF INCOMETAX EVADERS, Rajya Sabha Debate, RSdebate.nic.in
- Gupta, Balkrishna (16 December 1954), STATEMENT RE.FIRING NEAR KURNOO L, Rajya Sabha Debate, RSdebate.nic.in
- Gupta, Balkrishna (17 August 1955), Synthetic Diamond manufacturing Factory, Rajya Sabha Debate, RSdebate.nic.in
- Gupta, Balkrishna (25 August 1955), U.N. MILITARY OBSERVERS IN KASHMIR,
- Rajya Sabha Debate, RSdebate.nic.in Gupta, Balkrishna (8 May 1968), THE PUBLIC PROVIDENT FUND BILL, 1968, Rajya Sabha Debate, rsdebate.nic.in
- Gupta, Balkrishna (10 May 1968, THE CONSTITUTION (AMENDMENT) BILL, 1964), Rajya Sabha Debate, RSdebate.nic.in
- Gupta, Balkrishna (1 May 1968) THE APPROPRIATION (NO. 2) BILL, 1968 continued, Rajya Sabha Debate, RSdebate.nic.in
- Gupta, Balkrishna (24 July 1968), MOTION RE THE SITUATION ARISING OUT OF THE DECISION OF THE GOVERNMENT OF U. S. S. R. TO SUPPLY ARMS TO PAKISTAN, Rajya Sabha Debate, RSdebate.nic.in
- Gupta, Balkrishna (26 July 1968), RESOLUTION RE ACCORDING FULL STATEHOOD TO THE UNION TERRITORY OF HIMACHAL PRADESH, Rajya Sabha Debate, RSdebate.nic.in
- Gupta, Balkrishna (30 July 1968), THE BORDER SECURITY FORCE BILL, 1968,RSDebate.nic.in
- Gupta, Balkrishna (1 August 1968), Reorganisation of Army, Rajya Sabha Debate, RSdebate.nic.in
- Gupta, Balkrishna (1 August 1968 ), Gorkhas in Chinese Army, Rajya Sabha Debate, RSdebate.nic.in
- Gupta, Balkrishna (1 August 1968 ), Rajya Sabha Debate, RSdebate.nic.in
- Gupta, Balkrishna (1 August 1968 ),THE GOLD (CONTROL) BILL, 1968 CONTD, Rajya Sabha Debate, RSdebate.nic.in
- Gupta, Balkrishna (2 August 1968), THE CONSTITUTION (AMENDMENT) BILL, 1964 (to amend article 291)Contd. Rajya Sabha Debate, RSdebate.nic.in
- Gupta, Balkrishna (5 August 1968), Jessop and co. ltd, RSDebate.nic.in
- Gupta, Balkrishna (12 August 1968), RESOLUTION RE CONTINUANCE OF PRESIDENT'S PROCLAMATION IN RELATION TO THE STATE OF WEST BENGAL,Rajya Sabha Debate, RSdebate.nic.in
- Gupta, Balkrishna (23 August 1968), MOTION RE SITUATION ARISING FROM THE ENTRY BY ARMED FORCES OF THE SOVIET UNION AND FOUR OF ITS WARSAW PACT ALLIES INTO CZECHOSLOVAKIA AND THE PRIME MINISTER'S STATEMENT IN RELATION THERETO, Rajya Sabha Debate, RSdebate.nic.in
- Gupta, Balkrishna (26 August 1968), PATENTS BILL 1967, Rajya Sabha Debate, RSdebate.nic.in
- Gupta, Balkrishna (28 August 1968),Losses in the store of National Gallery of Modern Art, RSDebate.nic.in
- Gupta, Balkrishna (29 August 1968),t [Charges against Shri Prem Kishan, I.C.S.RSDebate.nic.in
- Gupta, Balkrishna (30 August 1968),RESOLUTION RE REVISION OF INVESTMENT POLICY OF LIFE INSURANCE CORPORATION OF INDIA AND OTHER FINANCIAL INSTITUTIONS OF GOVERNMENT, RSDebate.nic.in
- Gupta, Balkrishna (30 August 1968),RESOLUTION RE REVISION OF INVESTMENT POLICY OF LIFE INSURANCE CORPORATION OF INDIA AND OTHER FINANCIAL INSTITUTIONS OF GOVERNMENT, RSDebate.nic.in
- Gupta, Balkrishna (2 December 1968),THE BANKING LAWS (AMENDMENT) BILL, 1968, RSDebate.nic.in
- Gupta, Balkrishna (3 December 1968),MOTION RE THE DROUGH1 SITUATION EM THE COUNTRY, RSDebate.nic.in
- Gupta, Balkrishna (9 December 1968),Losses Suffered in Customs And Other duties on Account of Reported Clandestine Imports From Nepal, RSDebate.nic.in
- Gupta, Balkrishna (12 December 1968),Reported anti-Indian agitation in Nepal, RSDebate.nic.in
- Gupta, Balkrishna (13 December 1968),CALLING ATTENTION, RSDebate.nic.in
- Gupta, Balkrishna (16 December 1968),MOTION RE FLOOD SITUATION IN THE COUNTRY, RSDebate.nic.in
- Gupta, Balkrishna (17 December 1968),THE FOOD CORPORATIONS (AMENDMENT) BILL,1968, RSDebate.nic.in
- Gupta, Balkrishna (18 December 1968),THE MOTOR VEHICLES (AMENDMENT) BILL, 1965, RSDebate.nic.in
- Gupta, Balkrishna (19 December 1968),I.THE APPRORIATION (RAILWAYS) NO.5 BILL,1968., II, THE APPROPRIATION (RAILWAYS) NO,6 BILL,1968.RSDebate.nic.in
- Gupta, Balkrishna (20 December 1968),RESOLUTION RE DEVELOPMENT OF CALCUTTA, RSDebate.nic.in
- Gupta, Balkrishna (26 December 1968),RESOLUTION SEEKING DISAP PROVAL OF THE ESSENTIAL SER VICES MAINTENANCE ORDINAN CE, 1968 (No. 9 of 1968), II. THE ESSENTIAL SERVICES MAINTENANCE BILL, 1968,RSDebate.nic.in
- Gupta, Balkrishna (6 March 1969),REFERENCE TO GOVERNOR'S ADDRESS TO WEST BENGAL LEGISLATURE, RSDebate.nic.in
- Gupta, Balkrishna (7 May 1969),THE APPROPRIATION (No.3) BILL, 1969, RSDebate.nic.in
- Gupta, Balkrishna (13 May 1969), MOTION RE: FOURTH FIVE YEAR PLAN, RSDebate.nic.in
- Gupta, Balkrishna (29 July 1969),THE FOREIGN MARRIAGE BILL, 1963,RSDebate.nic.in
- Gupta, Balkrishna (1 August 1969 ),STATEMENT RE INCIDENTS IN THE WEST BENGAL LEGISLATURE ON 31 ST JULY, 1969, RSDebate.nic.in
- Gupta, Balkrishna (21 August 1969),RESOLUTION SEEKING DISAPPROVAL OF THE CENTRAL SALES TAX(AMANDMENT)ORDINANCE,1969(NO.4 OF 1969), RSDebate.nic.in
- Gupta, Balkrishna (9 December 1969),SHORT DURATION DISCUSSION UNDER RULE 176 RE DEMAND FOR NATIONALISATION OF THE SUGAR INDUSTRY, RSDebate.nic.in
- Gupta, Balkrishna (10 December 1969),THE INTERNATIONAL MONETARY FUND AND BANK (AMENDMENT) BILL, 1969, RSDebate.nic.in
- Gupta, Balkrishna (24 December 1969),HALF AN-HOUR DISCUSSION RE. SHARES HELD BY SHRIMATI ARUNA ASAF ALI AND THE DIRECT TAXES PAID BY HER DURING THE LAST TEN YEARS, RSDebate.nic.in
- Gupta, Balkrishna (27 February 1970),RESOLUTION RE ADVERTISEMENTS BY GOVERNMENT PUBLIC SECTOR UNDERTAKINGS ETC.RSDebate.nic.in
- Gupta, Balkrishna (9 March 1970),CALLING ATTENTION TO A MATTER OF URGENGT PUBLIC IMPORTANCE -RECENT BROADCAST BY RADIO PEACE AND PROGRESS IN USSR, RSDebate.nic.in
- Gupta, Balkrishna (10 March 1970),THE BUDGET (RAILWAYS), 1970-71GENERAL DISCUSSION, RSDebate.nic.in
- Gupta, Balkrishna (16 March 1970),INVESTMENT COST OF STEEL PRODUCED AT BOKARO STEEL PLANT, RSDebate.nic.in
- Gupta, Balkrishna (16 March 1970),DELAY IN THE WORK OF EXECUTION OF FARAKKA PROJECT., RSDebate.nic.in
- Gupta, Balkrishna (18 March 1970),THE BUDGET (GENERAL) 1970-71 GENERAL DISCUSSION contd.RSDebate.nic.in
- Gupta, Balkrishna (20 March 1970)REPORTED ACUTE SCARCITY OF VANASPAT1 OIL IN THE COUNTRY AND THE SHARP RISE IN ITS PRICES,RSDebate.nic.in
- Gupta, Balkrishna (27 April 1970),RE LATHI CHARGE ON THE S. S. P. DEMONSTRATORS IN NEW DELHI BY THE POLICE,RSDebate.nic.in
- Gupta, Balkrishna (28 April 1970),MOTION RE STATEMENT MADE BY THE HOME MINISTER IN THE RAJYA SABHA ON APRIL 27, 1970 ON THE SSP DEMONSTRATION NEAR PATEL CHOWK ON APRIL 6, 1970. RSDebate.nic.in
- Gupta, Balkrishna (),RSDebate.nic.in
- Gupta, Balkrishna (),RSDebate.nic.in
- Gupta, Balkrishna (),RSDebate.nic.in
- Gupta, Balkrishna (1 May 1970),Latest Developments in Cambodia, RSDebate.nic.in
- Gupta, Balkrishna (4 May),THE APPROPRIATION (NO. 2) BILL, 1970, RSDebate.nic.in
- Gupta, Balkrishna (5 May 1970),THE APPROPRIATION (NO. 2) BILL, 1970, RSDebate.nic.in
- Gupta, Balkrishna (6 May 1970),THE APPROPRIATION (NO.2) BILL,1970, RSDebate.nic.in
- Gupta, Balkrishna (8 May 1970),HALF-AN-HOUR DISCUSSION ON POINTS ARISING OUT OF THE ANSWER TO STARRED QUESTION NO. 97 GIVEN IN THE RAJYA SABHA ON THE 30TH APRIL, 1970, REGARDING RADIO MOSCOW'S CRITICISM OF INDIAN LEADERS, RSDebate.nic.in
- Gupta, Balkrishna (20 May 1970),DISCUSSION ON THE WORKING OF THE MINISTRY OF DEFENCE,RSDebate.nic.in
- Gupta, Balkrishna (22 May 1970),DISCUSSION ON THE WORKING OF THE MINISTRY OF FOREIGN TRADE, RSDebate.nic.in
- Gupta, Balkrishna (),RSDebate.nic.in
- Gupta, Balkrishna (),RSDebate.nic.in
- Gupta, Balkrishna (),RSDebate.nic.in
- Gupta, Balkrishna (),RSDebate.nic.in
- Gupta, Balkrishna (),RSDebate.nic.in
- Gupta, Balkrishna (),RSDebate.nic.in
- Gupta, Balkrishna (),RSDebate.nic.in
- Gupta, Balkrishna (),RSDebate.nic.in

== Publications ==
- Gupta, Balkrishna (2013). Hashiye Par Padi Duniya. New Delhi: Rajkamal Prakashan. ISBN 8126724595.
- Vidyasagar Gupta, Prayag Shukla, Ruchira Gupta, Chitthiyan Renu Ki Bhai Birjoo Ko, New Delhi, Rajkamal Prakashan, ISBN 978-93-90971-68-8
