= Ranchi Women's College =

Women's college in Jharkhand, India

- Type: Undergraduate and Postgraduate college
- Established: 1949
- Affiliations: Ranchi University
- Principal: Dr. Supriya (Professor in Charge)
- Location: Ranchi, Jharkhand, India; 23.3780931°N 85.3273138°E
- Campus: Urban
- Website: http://www.ranchiwomenscollege.org/

Ranchi Women's College is a women's college located in Ranchi, Jharkhand, India. It is one of the oldest women's college in the state. It offers undergraduate and postgraduate courses in arts, commerce and sciences.

Professor Bhanumathy Prasad inaugurated this school on 18 July 1949, with 11 students and 3 teachers. It is affiliated with the Ranchi University.

== History ==
In August 2016, a new three-storey arts building was inaugurated at the college. It was named after former Indian president A. P. J. Abdul Kalam. The building covers an area of 2361.5 square feet. It was constructed at a cost of ₹3 crore. The ground floor has the administrative offices, the first floor contains seven lecture rooms and the second floor has a library and research department. The three larger lecture rooms could accommodate 200 students each, while the four smaller rooms has a capacity of 100 students each.

== Departments ==
=== Science ===
- Chemistry
- Physics
- Mathematics
- Botany
- Zoology
- Biotechnology

=== Social science ===
- Home science
- Economics
- Geography
- Psychology
- History
- Political science
- Sociology
- Commerce

=== Humanities ===
- Hindi
- Bengali
- English
- Nagpuri
- Urdu
- Sanskrit
- Philosophy
- Tribal and regional language

== Incidents ==
In January 2023, Ramesh Bais, the Governor of Jharkhand, ordered action against the principal Samshun Nehar, contractual teacher Vijayata Singh and contractual employee Azad Ali Ansari, owing to their involvement in financial irregularities of the college fund.

After an inquiry report submitted by university vice-chancellor Ajit Kumar Sinha, the accused were suspended. The university also transferred several faculty including Supriya of the English Department and Abha Khalko of the History Department. Vishnu Charan Mahto was appointed the new head of the college's English department.

== See also ==
- Education in India
- List of institutions of higher education in Jharkhand
