= Prem Chand Gupta =

Indian politician

Member of Parliament, Rajya Sabha
- In office 10 April 2020 – 9 April 2026
- Constituency: Bihar
- In office 10 April 2014 – 9 April 2020
- Succeeded by: Shibu Soren
- Constituency: Jharkhand

Minister of Corporate Affairs
- In office 30 May 2004 – 30 November 2008
- Prime Minister: Manmohan Singh
- Preceded by: Inder Kumar Gujral
- Succeeded by: H. R. Bhardwaj

Personal details
- Born: 3 February 1950 (age 76) Bhiwani, Punjab, India (now in Haryana, India)
- Party: Rashtriya Janata Dal

Prem Chand Gupta (born 3 February 1950) is an Indian politician and a former cabinet minister in Ministry of Corporate Affairs of India. He was a member of the Rajya Sabha, the upper house of Indian Parliament from Bihar. Earlier, he was elected from Jharkhand to the Rajya Sabha. He had some involvement in coal scam. He was previously an NRI based in Hong Kong who promoted a factory manufacturing watches in India (Indo Swiss Time) and entered politics later. He currently lives in South Extension, New Delhi.

== Rajya Sabha Elections ==
Position	Party	Constituency	From	To	Tenure
Member of Parliament, Rajya Sabha (1st Term)	JD	Bihar	10 April 1996	9 April 2002	5 years, 364 days
Member of Parliament, Rajya Sabha (2nd Term)	RJD	Bihar	10 April 2002	9 April 2008	5 years, 365 days
Member of Parliament, Rajya Sabha (3rd Term)	RJD	Bihar	10 April 2008	12 February 2014	5 years, 308 days
Member of Parliament, Rajya Sabha (4th Term)	RJD	Jharkhand	10 April 2014	25 March 2020	5 years, 350 days
Member of Parliament, Rajya Sabha (5th Term)	RJD	Bihar	10 April 2020	9 April 2026	6 years, 102 days
