= Jalaludin Ansari =

Indian politician

Member of Parliament, Rajya Sabha
- In office 1994-2000
- Constituency: Bihar

Personal details
- Born: 17 November 1942
- Died: 17 December 2017 (aged 75)
- Party: Communist Party of India
- Spouse: Zamima Khatoon

Jalaludin Ansari was an Indian politician. He was a Member of Parliament, representing Bihar in the Rajya Sabha, the upper house of India's Parliament, as a member of the Communist Party of India.
