= Ram Deo Bhandary =

Indian politician

Professor Ram Deo Bhandary, a politician from the Rashtriya Janata Dal party, was a Member of the Parliament of India representing Bihar in the Rajya Sabha, the upper house of the Indian Parliament. He was also a great leader, social worker and teacher. He is very well known in Bihar for his great works.

== Early life and education ==
Ram Deo Bhandary was born on 5 January 1940. He got a degree of matric from Kejriwal High School at Jhanjharpur. He then went to Darbhanga's cm science college, from where he got a degree in B.Sc. He did post graduation from Patna university in 1966, where he was awarded gold medal in mathematics.

== Job ==
He worked as a teacher for sometime at a college of samastipur. But due to being alone in brothers he had to leave his job and come back to Jhanjharpur. After that he got busy in teaching the students as a teacher of lalit narayan janta college. He always wanted to increase the literacy rate of Bihar and he always gave his contribution in the progress of his area and country. After that he did law for two parts and then left studies.

== Political life ==
He was having all the qualities of a political leader from his childhood. In 1975, he started to learn politics under jannayak karpoori thakur and in the same year police arrested him in DIR mission and he was sent to muzaffarpur central jail. People started jail bharo andolan for his release. After returning from jail he did a lot of protest against the current running congress party's wrong running. After this he became famous as a leader in Jhanjharpur. In 1978 he was appointed on some deputy chairman post Jhanjharpur municipality. In 1980 he fought against Bihar former chief minister Jagannath Mishra in which he was defeated. But afterwards he won the rajya sabha elections. He was general secretary of RJD. From 1992 to 2008 he was elected as member of parliament for continuous 16 years.

== Death ==
Ram Deo was suffering from cancer for 2 years in Delhi. He died on 21 September 2018 at 10:30 pm. His body was returned via Patna to Jhanjharpur, where condolence was conducted. A huge crowd with many big ministers and mp and many people, his family members, supporters etc. gathered to take his last look. Condolence was also conducted at different party offices of different parties like congress, JDU, RJD etc.

He must have died but he would be forever remembered in everyone's heart.
