= Amarendra Dhari Singh =

Indian politician and entrepreneur

Member of Parliament, Rajya Sabha
- In office 10 April 2020 — 9 April 2026
- Constituency: Bihar

Personal details
- Born: Patna
- Party: Rashtriya Janata Dal

Amarendra Dhari Singh is an Indian politician and entrepreneur. He was elected to the Rajya Sabha, the upper house of Indian Parliament, from Bihar as a member of the Rashtriya Janata Dal. He has a company in the real estate and chemical sector. He is also heavily implicated in the Fertilizer import scam and under investigation from ED and CBI..He supports giving more funding to underprivileged kids in education.
