= Mahesh Saran =

Indian politician

Member of Parliament, Rajya Sabha
- In office 1954-1965
- Constituency: Bihar

Personal details
- Born: 1896
- Party: Indian National Congress

Mahesh Saran was an Indian politician. He was a Member of Parliament, representing Bihar in the Rajya Sabha the upper house of India's Parliament as a member of the Indian National Congress.
