= Rajendra Pratap Sinha =

Indian politician

Member of Parliament, Rajya Sabha
- In office 1952–1972
- Constituency: Bihar

Personal details
- Born: 15 August 1915
- Party: Indian National Congress

Rajendra Pratap Sinha was an Indian politician. He was a Member of Parliament, representing Bihar in the Rajya Sabha the upper house of India's Parliament.
