= Ram Gopal Agarwala =

Indian politician (15 September 1914 - 13 November 1972)

Member of Parliament, Rajya Sabha
- In office 1952-1962
- Constituency: Bihar

Personal details
- Born: 15 September 1914
- Died: 13 November 1972 (aged 58)
- Party: Indian National Congress
- Spouse: Sarla Devi Agarwala

Ram Gopal Agarwala (15 September 1914 - 13 November 1972) was an Indian politician. He was a Member of Parliament, representing Bihar in the Rajya Sabha the upper house of India's Parliament as a member of the Indian National Congress.
