= Jagadambi Prasad Yadav =

Indian politician

Minister of State for Commerce & Industry
- In office 26 January 1979 – 28 July 1979
- Prime Minister: Morarji Desai
- Minister: George Fernandes

Minister of State for Health & Family Welfare
- In office 14 August 1977 – 26 January 1979
- Prime Minister: Morarji Desai
- Minister: Raj Narain; Morarji Desai

Member of Parliament, Lok Sabha
- In office 1996–2002
- Preceded by: Suraj Mandal
- Succeeded by: Pradeep Yadav
- Constituency: Godda
- In office 1977–1980
- Preceded by: Jagdish Mandal
- Succeeded by: Maulana Saminuddin
- Constituency: Godda

Member of Parliament, Rajya Sabha
- In office 3 April 1982 – 2 April 1988
- Constituency: Bihar
- In office 3 April 1968 – 2 April 1974
- Constituency: Bihar

President of Bharatiya Janata Party, Bihar
- In office 1982–1984
- Preceded by: Kailashpati Mishra

Personal details
- Born: 1 January 1925 Munger, Bihar and Orissa Province, British India
- Died: 20 July 2002 (aged 77) Coimbatore, Tamil Nadu, India
- Party: Bharatiya Janata Party
- Spouse: Janaki Devi
- Children: 8
- Education: B.A.

Jagadambi Prasad Yadav was a Bharatiya Janata Party (BJP) leader and a minister of state Health and Family Welfare from 1977 to 1979 and then minister of state Commerce and Industry in the Morarji Desai Government of India. He was elected to Lok Sabha from Godda in Jharkhand. At the time of his death in 2002, he was Convenor of the Parliamentary Committee on Official Languages. He was President of Bharatiya Jana Sangh in Bihar as well as Bihar Bharatiya Janata Party from 1982 to 1984.
