= Purabi Mukhopadhyay =

Indian politician

Member of Parliament, Rajya Sabha
- In office 1970–1982
- Constituency: West Bengal

Personal details
- Born: 7 July 1923
- Died: 11 March 1991 (aged 67)
- Party: Indian National Congress

Purabi Mukhopadhyay (1923-1991) was an Indian politician . She was a Member of Parliament, representing West Bengal in the Rajya Sabha the upper house of India's Parliament as a member of the Indian National Congress.
