= Tajamul Husain =

Indian politician (1893 – 1974)

Personal details
- Born: 19 December 1893
- Died: 11 November 1974 (aged 80)
- Political party: Indian National Congress
- Spouse: Sabera Begum
- Children: 5 sons and 2 daughters
- Parent: Nawab Sarfraz Husain (father)
- Education: Bar-at-Law
- Alma mater: King's College School, Wimbledon, Queens' College, Cambridge and Inner Temple, London
- Profession: Barrister

Tajamul Husain (19 December 1893 – 11 November 1974) was an Indian politician, Member of the Constituent Assembly and two times member of Rajya Sabha (the upper house of the Parliament of India) from 1952 to 1956 and from 1956 to 1962. In 1948, he was member of the Indian delegation to the Inter-Parliamentary Conference.

== Early life and background ==
Husain was born on 19 December 1893. He did his education from King's college school, Wimbledon and Queens' College, Cambridge. He was a barrister by profession and studied law at Inner Temple, London in 1920.

== Political career ==
In 1921, Tajamul Husain joined Congress. He was a member of Bihar Legislative Assembly from 1937 to 1950, Member of Constituent Assembly from 1946 to 1950, Member of Provisional Parliament 1950 to 1952 and Member of Rajya Sabha (the upper house of the Parliament of India) from 1952 to 1956 and from 1956 to 1962.

== Positions held ==
#	From	To	Position
1	1937	1950	Member of Bihar Legislative Assembly: 1946 to 1950 - Member of Constituent Assembly
2	1950	1952	Member of Provisional Parliament
3	1952	1956	Member of Rajya Sabha (1st term)
4	1956	1962	Member of Rajya Sabha (2nd term)
