= Mahendra Sahni =

Indian politician

Shri Mahendra Sahni (4 April 1940 in Brahmapura, Muzaffarpur district, Bihar – 6 November 2009) was an Indian politician of the Janata Dal (United) party who was a Member of the Parliament of India representing Bihar in the Rajya Sabha, the upper house of the Indian Parliament.

He was member of Bihar Legislative Council during 1994–2000.
