= Rajendra Kumar Poddar =

Indian politician

Member of Parliament, Rajya Sabha
- In office 1968–1980
- Constituency: Bihar

Personal details
- Born: 5 December 1936
- Party: Independent
- Spouse: Neela Devi Poddar

Rajendra Kumar Poddar is an Indian politician. He was a Member of Parliament, representing Bihar in the Rajya Sabha the upper house of India's Parliament as an independent.
