= Kishori Ram =

Indian politician (1921–2003)

Member of Parliament, Rajya Sabha
- In office 1952–1962
- Constituency: Bihar

Personal details
- Born: 11 January 1921 Bihar, India
- Died: 4 February 2003 (aged 82)
- Party: Indian National Congress

Kishori Ram (11 January 1921 – 4 February 2003) was an Indian politician. He was a Member of Parliament, representing Bihar in the Rajya Sabha the upper house of India's Parliament as a member of the Indian National Congress. Ram died on 4 February 2003, at the age of 82.
