= Syed Mazhar Imam =

Indian politician (1908 - 1988)

Member of Bihar Legislative Assembly
- In office 1946

Member of Rajya Sabha from Bihar
- In office 3 April 1952 – 2 April 1956

Member of Rajya Sabha from Bihar
- In office 3 April 1956 – 2 April 1962

Personal details
- Born: 1908
- Died: 22 February 1988 (aged 79–80)
- Party: Indian National Congress
- Spouse: Married - 1925
- Children: 2 sons and 2 daughters
- Parent: Syed Fazal Imam (father)

Syed Mazhar Imam (1908 - 22 February 1988) was an Indian politician and Member of Bihar Legislative Assembly in 1946 and Member of Rajya Sabha (the upper house of the Parliament of India) from 1952 to 1956 and from 1956 to 1962.

== Position held ==
#	From	To	Position
1	1946	1951	Member of Bihar Legislative Assembly (1st term)
2	1952	1956	Member of Rajya Sabha from Bihar (1st term)
3	1956	1962	Member of Rajya Sabha from Bihar (2nd term)
