= Rama Bahadur Sinha =

Indian politician

Member of Parliament (Rajya Sabha)
- In office 1952-1970
- Constituency: Bihar

Personal details
- Born: 30 July 1910
- Died: 1 May 1976 (aged 65) Darbhanga
- Party: Indian National Congress
- Spouse: Radha Devi

Rama Bahadur Sinha (1910–1976) was an Indian politician.He was a member of the Rajya Sabha, the upper house of the Parliament of India. representing Bihar as a member of the Indian National Congress.
