= Suraj Prasad =

Indian politician

Member of Parliament, Rajya Sabha
- In office 1968–1974
- In office 1982–1988
- Constituency: Bihar

Personal details
- Born: 2 January 1925 Shivpur East village, Uttar Pradesh, India
- Died: December 2009 (aged 84)
- Party: Communist Party of India
- Spouse: Rajbanshi Devi
- Children: 3 sons and 4 Daughters

Suraj Prasad (2 January 1925 – December 2009) was an Indian politician. He was a Member of Parliament, representing Bihar in the Rajya Sabha (the upper house of India's Parliament) as a member of the Communist Party of India. He died in December 2009 at the age of 84.
