= Pratul Chandra Mitra =

Indian politician

Member of Parliament, Rajya Sabha
- In office 1960–1972
- Constituency: Bihar

Personal details
- Born: 29 July 1908
- Party: Indian National Congress

Pratul Chandra Mitra (born 29 July 1908, date of death unknown) was an Indian politician. He was a Member of Parliament, representing Bihar in the Rajya Sabha the upper house of India's Parliament as a member of the Indian National Congress.
