= Shishir Kumar =

Indian politician

Member of Parliament, Rajya Sabha
- In office 1964–1976
- Constituency: Bihar

Personal details
- Party: Praja Socialist Party

Shishir Kumar was an Indian politician who represented the state of Bihar in the Rajya Sabha between 1964 and 1976.

== Political life ==
Kumar was a Member of Parliament, representing Bihar in the Rajya Sabha the upper house of India's Parliament as a member of the Praja Socialist Party.
