= Ramanand Yadav =

Indian politician (born 1927)

Member of Parliament, Rajya Sabha
- In office 1976–1988
- Constituency: Bihar

Personal details
- Born: 1927
- Party: Indian National Congress

Ramanand Yadav (born 1927) was an Indian politician. He was a Member of Parliament, representing Bihar in the Rajya Sabha (upper house) of India's Parliament as a member of the Indian National Congress.
