= Rajeshwar Prasad Narain Sinha =

Indian politician

Member of Parliament, Rajya Sabha
- In office 1952 - 1958
- In office 1959 - 1966
- Constituency: Bihar

Personal details
- Born: 29 December 1906
- Party: Indian National Congress

Rajeshwar Prasad Narain Sinha (born 29 December 1906, date of death unknown) was an Indian politician. He was a Member of Parliament, representing Bihar in the Rajya Sabha the upper house of India's Parliament as a member of the Indian National Congress.
