= Bhola Prasad (politician) =

Indian politician

Member of Parliament, Rajya Sabha
- In office 1970-1982
- Constituency: Bihar

Personal details
- Born: 7 January 1918
- Died: 1993
- Party: Communist Party of India

Bhola Prasad was an Indian politician. He was a Member of Parliament, representing Bihar in the Rajya Sabha (the upper house of India's Parliament) as a member of the Communist Party of India.
