= Bhola Paswan Shastri =

Indian politician

Leader of the Opposition in Rajya Sabha
- In office 24 February 1978 – 23 March 1978
- Preceded by: Kamalapati Tripathi
- Succeeded by: Kamalapati Tripathi

Member of Parliament, Rajya Sabha
- In office 31 May 1972 – 2 April 1982
- Constituency: Bihar

8th Chief Minister of Bihar
- In office 2 June 1971 – 9 January 1972
- Preceded by: Karpoori Thakur
- Succeeded by: President's rule Kedar Pandey
- In office 22 June 1969 – 4 July 1969
- Preceded by: Harihar Singh
- Succeeded by: President's rule
- In office 22 March 1968 – 29 June 1968
- Preceded by: B. P. Mandal
- Succeeded by: President's rule

Personal details
- Born: 21 September 1914 Bairgacchi, Bihar and Orissa Province, British India
- Died: 10 September 1984 (aged 69) New Delhi, India
- Party: Indian National Congress
- Children: Lt. Bechan Paswan (Foster son), Megha Kumari (granddaughter)
- Education: Kashi Vidyapith, Varanasi
- Profession: Politician, social worker

Bhola Paswan Shastri (21 September 1914 – 10 September 1984) was an Indian independence activist and politician who thrice served as Chief Minister of Bihar between 1968 and 1982. He was the first individual from the Scheduled Castes and Scheduled Tribes to be Chief Minister of Bihar, and the second person from the SC community overall to be a state Chief Minister after Andhra Pradesh's Damodaram Sanjivayya. To honour him, Bhola Paswan Shastri College, Babhangama, Bihariganj, Madhepura is named after him.

== Biography ==
Bhola Paswan Shastri was born in a Paswan community in the village of Bairgacchi, in Purnia district (now Katihar District). Shastri's family was poor, and his father worked in the home of the Raj Darbhanga's royal family.

In 1968, Shastri became Chief Minister of Bihar for the first time, though this term lasted only three months. This marked the first time a member of the Scheduled Castes and Scheduled Tribes had become Chief Minister of Bihar, and the second SC Chief Minister overall after Andhra Pradesh's Damodaram Sanjivayya. He became Chief Minister for second time for 13 days in 1969 and for third time in 1971 for seven months before political turmoil overtook the state.To honour him Bhola Paswan Shastri College Babhangama Bihariganj Madhepura is named after him.

Shastri died on 10 September 1984 in New Delhi.

== Legacy ==
Despite his short tenures as Chief Minister, Shastri continues to be a popular figure in Bairgacchi. Bhola Paswan Shastri Agricultural College is named after him. Also Bhola Paswan Shastri College Babhangama Bihariganj Madhepura is named after him.
