= Mahabir Dass =

Indian politician

Member of Parliament, Rajya Sabha
- In office 1962-1974
- Constituency: Bihar

Personal details
- Born: 10 January 1915
- Died: 1984 (aged 68–69)
- Party: Indian National Congress

Mahabir Dass was an Indian politician. He was a Member of Parliament, representing Bihar in the Rajya Sabha the upper house of India's Parliament as a member of the Indian National Congress.
