= Ram Sahai =

Indian politician

Member of Parliament, Rajya Sabha
- In office 1956–1974
- Constituency: Madhya Pradesh

Personal details
- Born: 1895
- Party: Indian National Congress

Ram Sahai was an Indian politician. He was a Member of Parliament, representing Madhya Pradesh in the Rajya Sabha the upper house of India's Parliament as a member of the Indian National Congress. He was a member of the Constituent Assembly of India representing Madhya Bharat.
