= Mahendra Mohan Mishra =

Indian politician

Member of Parliament, Rajya Sabha
- In office 1976-1988
- Constituency: Bihar

Personal details
- Born: 1 December 1929
- Party: Indian National Congress
- Spouse: Shashi Lekha Mishra

Mahendra Mohan Mishra was an Indian politician. He was a Member of Parliament, representing Bihar in the Rajya Sabha the upper house of India's Parliament as a member of the Indian National Congress.
