= Awadeshwar Prasad Sinha =

Indian politician

Awadheshwar Prasad Sinha

Member of Parliament, Rajya Sabha
- In office 1956–1976
- Constituency: Bihar

Member of Parliament, Lok Sabha
- In office 1952–1956
- Constituency: Muzaffarpur East, Bihar

Personal details
- Born: June 1907 Manipur Dahila, Muzaffarpur, Bihar, British India
- Died: 1989
- Party: Indian National Congress
- Profession: Politician

Awadheshwar Prasad Sinha (1907-1989) was an Indian politician. He was elected to the Rajya Sabha, the upper house of the Parliament of India from Bihar for 4 terms from 1956 to 1976. He was elected from Muzaffarpur-East, Bihar in 1952 as a member of the Indian National Congress.
