= Dharamchand Jain =

Indian politician (1935–1995)

Member of Parliament, Rajya Sabha
- In office 1970-1982
- Constituency: Bihar

Personal details
- Born: 15 August 1935
- Died: 12 December 1995 (aged 60)
- Party: Indian National Congress
- Spouse: Sobha Jain

Dharamchand Jain (1935–1995) was an Indian politician. He was a Member of Parliament, representing Bihar in the Rajya Sabha the upper house of India's Parliament as a member of the Indian National Congress.
