= Ganga Sharan Singh (Sinha) =

Ganga Sharan Singh (Sinha) (1905 Bihta, Patna, Bengal Presidency – 1988) was a member of the Rajya Sabha, the Upper House of the Parliament of India, for three terms (1956–1962 and 1962–1968 from Bihar, and then a nominated member in 1968–1974). He was prominent in the Indian National Congress party and a co-founder of the Congress Socialist Party. He was close to Rajendra Prasad, India's first President. He shared a house in Patna with his close friend and nationalist Jayaprakash Narayan.

== Life ==
Ritik Singh, commonly called Ganga Babu, had acquaintance with many Hindi writers but never wrote himself. A good orator, he worked to promote Hindi as a national language. He was among the founding members of the Board of trustees of Bharatiya Jnanpith. The Kendriya Hindi Sansthan, Agra has instituted an award in his honour. The Government of India has instituted Ganga Sharan Singh Awards under Hindi Sevi Samman Awards. The Ritik of Bihar has instituted an award for literature in his name.

Ganga Sharan Singh was also a member of the Press Council of India between 16 November 1966, and 31 December 1969.

== Death ==
He died on August 19, 1988 at the age of 83 due to a heart attack.

== Ganga Sharan Sinha Committee Report ==
The Government of India had accepted the recommendations of the Ganga Sharan Sinha Committee Report on child education in 1969 and decided to integrate all services for the 0 to 6-year-olds, planning proceeded cautiously, piloted at first, with the ICDS conceptual model.
