= 1988 Rajya Sabha elections =

Elections for the Upper House of Indian Parliament

Rajya Sabha elections were held in 1988, to elect members of the Rajya Sabha, Indian Parliament's upper chamber.

== Elections ==
Elections were held in 1988 to elect members from various states. The list is incomplete.

=== Members elected ===
The following members are elected in the elections held in 1988. They are members for the term 1988-94 and retire in year 1994, except in case of the resignation or death before the term.

State - Member - Party

Rajya Sabha members for term 1988-1994
State	Member Name	Party	Remark
AP	Satyanarayana Dronamraju	INC	
AP	M K Rehman	TDP	
AP	Mentay Padmanabham	TDP	bye 13/09/1989
AP	L Narsing Naik	TDP	dea 12/01/1989
AP	Moturu Hanumantha Rao	CPM	
AP	N Thulasi Reddy	TDP	
AP	Dr Y Sivaji	TDP	
Bihar	Sitaram Kesari	INC	
Bihar	Dr Faguni Ram	INC	
Bihar	Dayanand Sahay	INC	
Bihar	Shamim Hashmi	INC	bye 25/09/1989
Bihar	Shamim Hashmi	JD	res 28/07/1989
Bihar	Dr Jagannath Mishra	INC	res 16/03/1990
Bihar	Rafique Alam	INC	
Bihar	Yashwant Sinha	JD	res 14/11/1993
Bihar	Bideshwari Dubey	INC	dea 20/01/1993
GJ	Vithalbhai M Patel	INC	
GJ	Ramsinh Rathwa	INC	
GJ	Madhavsinh Solanki	INC	
GJ	Rajubhai Parmar	INC	
Himachal Pradesh	Sushil Barongpa	INC	R
Haryana	Mohinder Singh Lather	OTH	
Jammu and Kashmir	Ghulam Rasool Matto	OTH	
Jammu and Kashmir	Dharam Pal	INC	res 27/11/1989 LS
Jammu and Kashmir	Rajendra Prasad Jain	INC	res 27/11/1989 LS
KA	H. Hanumanthappa	INC	
KA	J P Javali	JD	
KA	A S Siddiqui	JD	
Kerala	E. Balanandan	CPM	
Kerala	M M Jacob	INC	
Kerala	A Sreedharan	JD	
Madya Pradesh	L K Advani	BJP	27/11/1989
Madya Pradesh	Dr Jinendra Kumar Jain	BJP	bye 23/03/1990
Madya Pradesh	Hans Raj Bhardwaj	INC	
Madya Pradesh	Radhakishan Chhotuji Malviya	INC	
Madya Pradesh	Ratan Kumari	INC	
Madya Pradesh	Veena Verma	INC	
MH	M C Bhandare	INC	
MH	Saroj Khaparde	INC	
MH	Suresh Kalmadi	INC	
MH	Vithalrao M Jadhav	INC	
MH	Vishvjit P. Singh	INC	
MH	Vishwarao R Patil	JD	res 14/05/1993
Nominated	Madan Bhatia	NOM	
Nominated	Sat Pal Mittal	NOM	Dea 12/01/1992
Nominated	Bishambhar Nath Pande	NOM	
OR	Santosh Kumar Sahu	INC	
OR	Kanhu Charan Lenka	INC	
OR	Manmohan Mathur	INC	
Punjab	Sat Paul Mittal	INC	
Rajasthan	Dr Ahmed Abrar	INC	
Rajasthan	Bhuvnesh Chaturvedi	INC	
Rajasthan	Kamal Morarka	JDS	
Uttar Pradesh	M A Ansari	INC	Dea 14/07/1990
Uttar Pradesh	Maulana Asad Madani	INC	
Uttar Pradesh	Anand Prakash Gautam	IND	
Uttar Pradesh	Smt Kailashpati	INC	
Uttar Pradesh	Shanti Tyagi	INC	
Uttar Pradesh	Ish Dutt Yadav	JD	
Uttar Pradesh	Ram Naresh Yadav	INC	bye 20/06/1989
Uttar Pradesh	Ram Naresh Yadav	JD	res 12/04/1989
Uttar Pradesh	Hari Singh Chowdhary	INC	
Uttar Pradesh	Shiv Pratap Mishra	INC	
Uttar Pradesh	Satya Bahin	INC	
WB	Gurudas Dasgupta	CPI	
WB	Prof Saurin Bhattacharjee	RSP	
WB	M Amin	CPM	
WB	Sukomal Sen	CPM	
WB	Ashish Sen	CPM	

== Bye-elections ==
The following bye elections were held in the year 1988.

State - Member - Party

1. Sikkim - Karma Topden - INC ( ele 30/03/1988 term till 1993 )
2. Bihar - Pratibha Singh - INC ( ele 03/04/1988 term till 1992 )
3. Kerala - P K Kunjachen - CPM ( ele 22/08/1988 term till 1992 ) dea 14/06/1991
4. Orissa - Baikunatha Nath Sahu - INC ( ele 07/10/1988 term till 1990 )
5. Maharashtra - S B Chavan - INC ( ele 28/10/1988 term till 1990 )
6. Manipur - R.K. Dorendra Singh - INC ( elected 20/09/1988 term till 1990 )
7. Nominated - Syeda Anwara Taimur - INC ( ele 25/11/1988 term till 1990 )
8. Uttar Pradesh - Bir Bahadur Singh - INC ( ele 25/11/1988 term till 1990 ) dea 30/05/1989
9. Uttar Pradesh - Syed S Razi - INC ( ele 06/12/1988 term till 1992 )
