= Bharti Enterprises =

Indian multinational conglomerate company

- Type: Private
- Industry: Conglomerate
- Founded: 1976; 50 years ago
- Founder: Sunil Bharti Mittal
- Headquarters: Bharti Crescent, 1 Nelson Mandela Road, Vasant Kunj, Delhi, India
- Area served: Worldwide
- Key people: Sunil Bharti Mittal (chairman)
- Brands: Airtel
- Services: Telecommunications; Digital television; Real estate; Hospitality; Life insurance
- Number of employees: ▼14,485 (2021)
- Subsidiaries: Bharti Airtel; Indus Towers; OneWeb; Bharti Real Estate; Bharti Realty; Bharti Global Limited; Bharti Hexacom; Gourmet Investments; Beetel Teletech; Norlake Hospitality
- Website: www.bharti.com

Bharti Enterprises Limited is an Indian multinational conglomerate, headquartered in Delhi. It was founded in 1976 by Sunil Bharti Mittal. Bharti Enterprises owns businesses spanning across telecommunications, manufacturing, insurance, real estate, hospitality. The group's flagship company, Bharti Airtel, is a telecom service provider with operations in more than 18 countries across Asia, Africa and Europe. The company ranks amongst the top two mobile network operators globally by number of subscribers.

== History ==
The company was founded by Sunil Bharti Mittal with his two siblings in 1976. The company initially started manufacturing bicycles before diversifying into other sectors. It entered into telecommunications industry in 1995.

== Companies ==
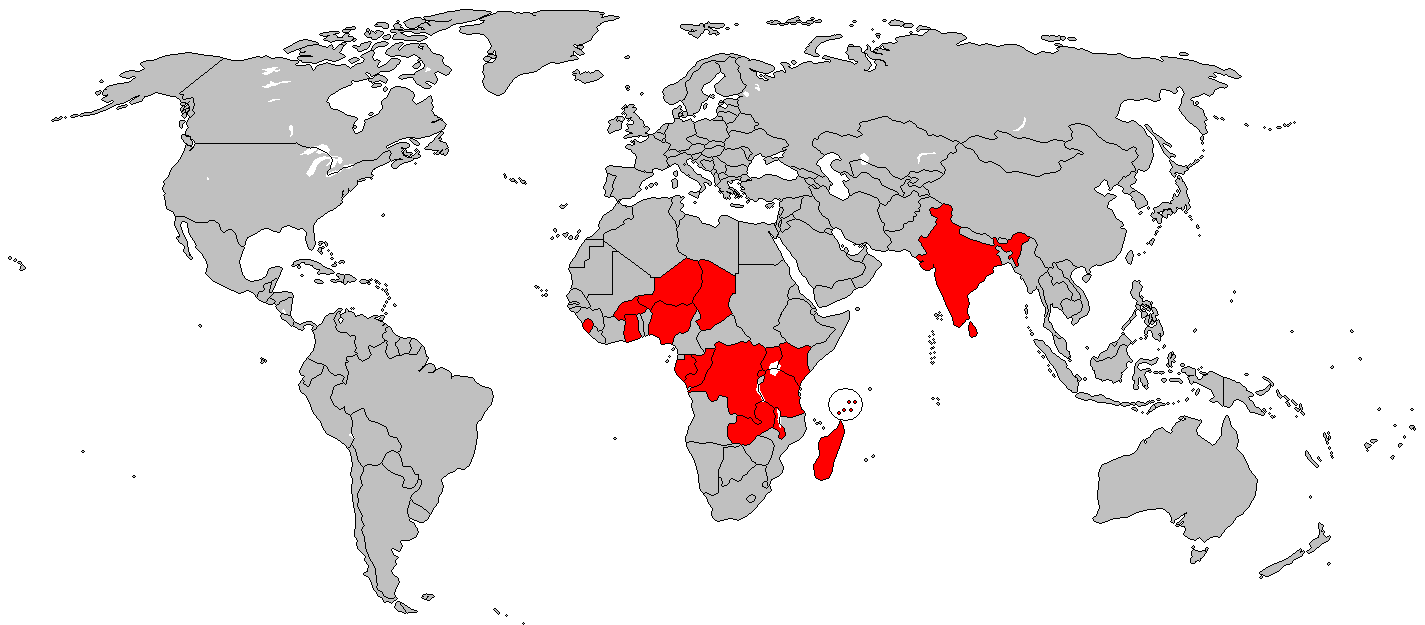
Coverage map of Bharti Airtel across 18 countries

Bharti is present in many sectors with the largest revenue contribution coming from the telecom industry.

=== Bharti Airtel ===
Bharti Telecom (BTL), is a holding company of Bharti Airtel with Bharti Enterprises and SingTel owning 50.56 percent and 49.44 percent, respectively, in BTL, which in turn owns 39.51 percent of Bharti Airtel.

Bharti Airtel is the third largest mobile operator in the world, in subscriber base, and has a presence across 18 countries. The company is India's second largest integrated telecom company in customer base and offers mobile, fixed line, high speed home broadband, M-commerce, DTH and enterprise service.

=== Indus Towers ===
Indus Towers Limited is an telecommunications infrastructure company offering passive infrastructure services to mobile network operators and other wireless services providers. Headquartered in Gurugram, Haryana, Indus Towers was incorporated in November 2007 by Bharti Infratel (a subsidiary of Bharti Airtel), Vodafone Essar, and Idea Cellular, to provide shared telecom infrastructure to telecom operators on a non-discriminatory basis.

Bharti Infratel merged with Indus Towers on 19 November 2020, creating one of the largest mobile tower infrastructure operators in the world. Post-merger, Bharti Airtel holds a 36.73% stake in Indus Towers, with Vodafone Group holding 28.12%, and 3.1% shares held by Providence Equity. Indus Towers has over 192,874 towers and 342,831 co-locations and a nationwide presence covering all 22 telecom circles.

In June 2024, Vodafone sold its entire stake in the company to Bharti Airtel, thus the company become a direct subsidiary of Bharti Airtel.

=== Beetel Teletech ===
Beetel Teletech Limited, formerly Brightstar Telecommunications India Limited, was founded in 1985. The company manufactures and distributes mobile accessories, IT peripherals, network and enterprise solutions, and landline phones. Its manufacturing unit is located in Ludhiana, Punjab. It is also a major distributor of IT and telecom products from international brands such as Avaya, Poly, Samsung, Panasonic, Huawei, QSC, Radwin, Ruckus, RAD and Actelis.

Beetel Teletech launched a 7-inch Android tablet priced at ₹9,999 (equivalent to ₹22,000 or US$230 in 2026) in India on 18 August 2011. The offering was intended to capitalise on the expected demand for cheap computing devices in the world's fastest-growing and second-largest mobile phone market.

=== Bharti Realty ===
Bharti Realty is the in-house real estate arm for Bharti Group and facilitates by extending support to the Group Companies for identifying, developing and maintaining real estate. It was established on 8 December 2003.

=== Gourmet Investments ===
Gourmet Investments Pvt Ltd was founded in 2012 by Ramit Mittal, the eldest son of Bharti Enterprises' vice chairman and managing director Rakesh Mittal, with support from the Bharti family office. The company signed a 50:50 joint venture partnership agreement with British restaurant chain PizzaExpress in 2012, and opened the first outlet in Mumbai later that year.

in 2018, Gourmet Investments partnered with Sri Lankan restaurant chain Ministry of Crab, owned by cricketers Kumara Sangakara, Mahela Jayawardene and chef Dharshan Munidasa, to launch outlets in India. The first outlet was opened at Khar, Mumbai in February 2019. In 2019, the company acquired some Indian outlets of the American restaurant chain Chili's. Gourmet Investments operates 16 outlets of PizzaExpress, Chili's and Ministry of Crab as of February 2023. In February 2023, Gourmet Investments reportedly signed an agreement with American restaurant chain P. F. Chang's to open outlets in India. The P. F. Chang's outlet in India was opened in Mumbai in January 2024.

=== Bharti AXA Life Insurance ===
Bharti AXA Life Insurance Company Limited is a joint venture between Bharti Enterprises and French insurance company AXA established in 2006. Bharti Enterprises holds a 51% stake in the joint venture, with AXA holding the remaining 49%. The company has a nationwide presence through 251 branches across India.

Bharti Enterprises sought to exit its insurance services business beginning negotiations with Reliance Industries to sell its stake in both Bharti AXA Life Insurance and Bharti AXA General Insurance in 2016. However, no agreement was reached. A consortium of the Hinduja Group and the Abu Dhabi Investment Authority reportedly entered negotiations to acquire Bharti AXA Life Insurance in December 2021.

=== Bharti Space & OneWeb ===
A 50% stake in OneWeb was acquired in July 2020, being a joint venture with the UK Government for broadband satellite Internet services.

=== Norlake Hospitality ===
Norlake Hospitality Limited is a real estate and hospitality property developer in Europe and the United States, in partnership with London-based hospitality company Ennismore. Headquartered in London, it was founded on 18 May 2012.

=== Emtel ===
Bharti Enterprises acquired a 25% stake in Emtel which is a Mauritius-based telecommunications company, on 27 April 2015 through its subsidiary, Indian Continent Investment Limited (ICIL).

=== BT Group ===
Bharti announced that it would acquire a 24.5% stake in British telecommunications company BT Group on 12 August 2024. The acquisition was completed on 16 December 2024.

== Philanthropy ==
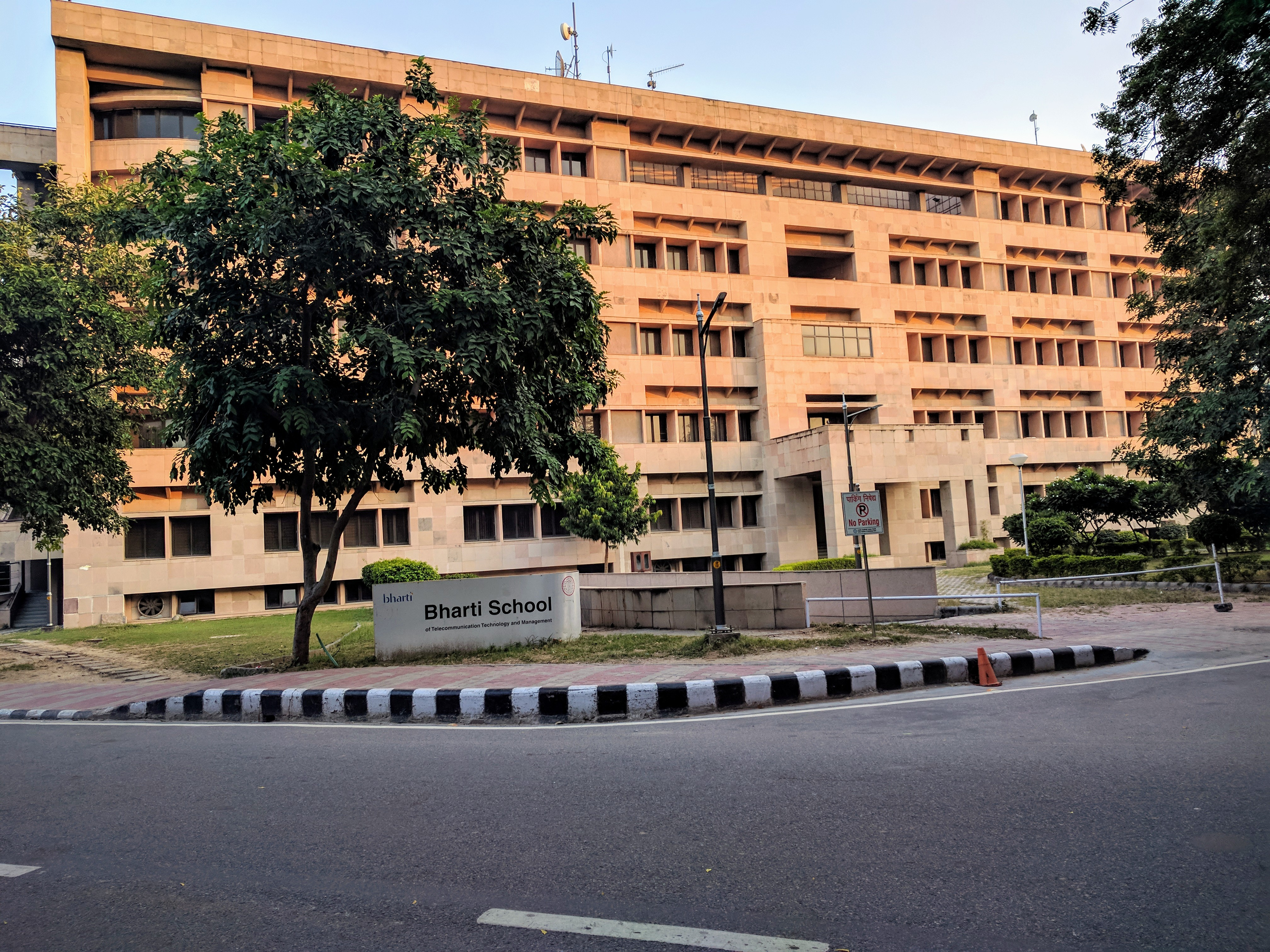
Bharti School of Management in IIT Delhi campus.

Bharti Foundation is the philanthropic arm of Bharti Enterprises. The Foundation has established schools in villages across India and offers free quality education with free books, uniform and mid day meals to poor children. Satya Bharti School Program' – the Foundation's flagship program is running 254 schools in six States serving over 45,000 rural children, free of cost. The other educational initiatives including the – Satya Bharti School, Quality Support and Learning Centre Programs, are currently reaching out to over 350,000 underprivileged children in 16 states. Other Program of the Foundation making considerable impact among the underprivileged sections is – 'Satya Bharti Abhiyan' (Sanitation).

In 2017, the Bharti Family pledged 10% of wealth (approx. Rs 70 billion) towards Philanthropy to set up Satya Bharti University, a world-class University to offer education to deserving youth from economically weaker sections of society.

== Former companies ==
=== Hike ===
Hike Private Limited was founded by Kavin Bharti Mittal in 2012. The company launched Hike Messenger, a freeware, cross-platform instant messaging (IM), Voice over IP (VoIP) application, on 12 December 2012. Hike Messenger had more than 100 million registered users as of August 2016. It was rebranded as Hike Sticker Chat in April 2019. The app was shut down in January 2021. The company stated that it would pivot to building a new bite-sized gaming service named Rush.

=== Centum Learning ===
Centum Learning Limited, formerly Bharti Learning Systems Limited, was a wholly owned subsidiary of Bharti Enterprises established in 2007. Centum Learning was acquired by education technology firm upGrad in a share swap deal in September 2022.

=== Del Monte Foods ===
Bharti Enterprises and investment group E.L. Rothschild established a 50:50 joint venture called FieldFresh Foods in 2004 to produce and export fresh vegetables and fruits. In 2007, Singapore-based Del Monte Pacific Limited (a subsidiary of Del Monte Foods) acquired a 40.1% stake from Rothschild for $20.8 million. The company also sold processed food and beverage products in India and South Asia under the Del Monte brand. The company was renamed Del Monte Foods Private Limited in 2021. Del Monte Foods was acquired by Agro Tech Foods Ltd in a share swap deal on 6 February 2025, with Bharti Enterprises receiving a 21% stake and Del Monte Pacific getting a 14% stake in Agro Tech Foods.

=== Bharti AXA General Insurance ===
Bharti AXA General Insurance Company Limited was a joint venture between Bharti Enterprises and French insurance company AXA incorporated on 13 July 2007. Bharti Enterprises held a 51% stake in the joint venture, with AXA holding the remaining 49%. The company had a nationwide presence through 135 branches across India. Bharti Enterprises sought to exit its insurance services business beginning negotiations with Reliance Industries to sell its stake in both Bharti AXA General Insurance and Bharti AXA Life Insurance in 2016. However, no agreement was reached.

On 21 August 2020, Bharti AXA General Insurance and ICICI Lombard signed a definitive agreement for the latter to acquire the former in an all stock deal. Per the terms of the agreement, shareholders of Bharti AXA General Insurance received 2 shares of ICICI Lombard for every 115 shares they held. The acquisition was completed on 8 September 2020. Bharti Enterprises received 18.23 million shares in ICICI Lombard and AXA received 17.52 million shares, worth a combined total of EUR 664 million. The Insurance Regulatory and Development Authority of India granted in-principle approval to the acquisition in November 2020, and final approval on 3 September 2021.

=== Bharti Infratel ===
Bharti Infratel Limited was a telecommunications infrastructure company that provided telecom infrastructure such as telecom towers, fiber networks and other related infrastructure. Headquartered in Gurugram, Haryana, the company was established by Bharti Airtel in July 2007 by spinning-off its mobile towers to a new wholly owned subsidiary. Bharti Infratel was the first Indian company to start a tower infrastructure sharing business. It was India's largest consolidated tower infrastructure company, directly owning 95,372 towers as on 31 March 2020.

Bharti Infratel was merged with Indus Towers on 19 November 2020. Prior to the merger, Bharti Infratel held a 42% stake in Indus Towers. Bharti Airtel now holds a 36.73% stake in Indus Towers.

=== Bharti Wal-Mart ===
Bharti Wal-Mart Private Limited was a 50:50 joint venture between Bharti Retail (a subsidiary of Bharti Enterprises) and Walmart that operated a chain of wholesale cash-and-carry retail stores in India. The two companies announced that they had signed an agreement to establish the company on 5 August 2007. In February 2009, Bharti Wal-Mart announced that the stores would be branded Best Price Modern Wholesale and that the first store would open in Punjab. The first Best Price Modern Wholesale opened in Amritsar in May 2009. Bharti and Walmart ended the partnership in October 2013, with Walmart acquiring Bharti's stake in the joint venture. At the time the partnership was called off, Bharti Wal-Mart operated 19 Best Price Modern Wholesale stores.

=== Bharti Retail/Easyday ===
Bharti Retail Limited was established as a wholly owned subsidiary of Bharti Enterprises at the time it began its joint venture with Walmart. Bharti Retail operated a chain of convenience stores, supermarkets and hypermarkets under the brand name Easyday. The stores were wholly owned by Bharti Retail, while Bharti Wal-Mart provided the back-end, wholesaling and logistical support for the Easyday stores.

In May 2015, Future Group acquired Bharti Retail in a deal worth around ₹500 crore (equivalent to ₹823 crore or US$86 million in 2026). Following the acquisition, Bharti Enterprises received 9% stakes in Future Retail Limited (manages retail operations) and Future Enterprises Limited (manages infrastructure, investments and assets). At the time of the acquisition, Bharti Retail operated 216 Easyday stores.
