= Sunil Mittal =

Indian industrialist and philanthropist (born 1957)

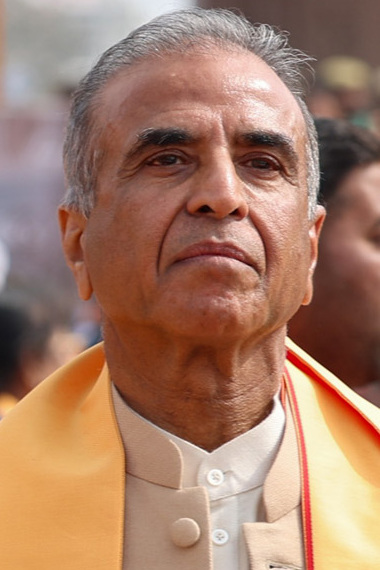
- Sunil Mittal in 2024
- Born: 23 October 1957 (age 69); Ludhiana, Punjab, India
- Education: Punjab University (BA)
- Occupations: Industrialist; philanthropist
- Title: Founder and chairman Bharti Enterprises
- Spouse: Nyna Mittal
- Children: 3 (including Kavin and Shravin)
- Father: Sat Pal Mittal
- Relatives: Sharan Pasricha (son-in-law)
- Awards: Padma Bhushan (2007), KBE (2024)

Sunil Bharti Mittal (born 23 October 1957) is an Indian entrepreneur and philanthropist. He is the Founder and Chairman of Bharti Enterprises, a conglomerate with interests in telecommunications, satellite communications, digital infrastructure, financial services, real estate, and hospitality. Its flagship company, Bharti Airtel, operates in 17 countries across India, South Asia and Africa and is the world's second-largest mobile operator by subscriber base. In 2024, Bharti Airtel became the first Indian company of its generation to reach a market capitalisation of US$100 billion.

Mittal also serves as the Co-Chairman of Eutelsat and is a Director on the board of BT Group Plc.

He has held various roles in several business and industry bodies. He was the Chaiman of the International Chamber of Commerce from 2016 to 2018 and the GSM Association from 2017 to 2018. Between 2009 and 2021, he served as a trustee of the Carnegie Endowment for International Peace. During India's G20 presidency in 2023, he chaired the B20 Action Council on African Economic Integration. His additional board and advisory roles include membership in the World Economic Forum's International Business Council, Hakluyt's International Advisory Board, and the Global Board of Advisors at the Council on Foreign Relations. He has previously served on the boards of Unilever, Standard Chartered, and SoftBank Corp.

Mittal currently holds Co-Chair positions at the India-UK CEO Forum and is a Co-Anchor of the ICT and Emerging Technologies & Digital Infrastructure working group of the India–US CEO Forum. Earlier, he was the President of the Confederation of Indian Industry (2007–2008) and a member of the Prime Minister of India's Council on Trade and Industry (2004–2014). He was awarded the Padma Bhushan by the Government of India in 2007. In 2024, he was appointed an honorary Knight Commander of the Order of the British Empire (KBE) by H.M. King Charles III, becoming the first Indian citizen to receive the honour from the King.

== Early life and education ==
Mittal was born in 1957 in Ludhiana, Punjab, India. He is of no relation to fellow Indian industrialist Lakshmi Mittal. Sunil's father, Sat Pal Mittal, was a politician who served three terms as a member of the Rajya Sabha between 1976 and 1992, and received the United Nations Peace Medal in 1987 from Secretary-General Javier Pérez de Cuéllar for his work in population control, development, and world peace. Sunil Mittal attended school in Punjab, including a period at Wynberg Allen School in Mussoorie, and graduated with a Bachelor of Arts from Panjab University in 1976.

== Career ==
=== 1976–1989: Early ventures ===
Mittal began his career in 1976, founding Bharti Enterprises with a ₹20,000 investment to manufacture bicycle crankshafts in Ludhiana. He subsequently diversified into the production of shoddy yarn and stainless steel sheets. In 1980, he established Bharti Overseas Trading Company to import industrial materials and consumer products and in 1981, began importing and distributing Suzuki portable generators. This business ceased in 1983 following government restrictions on generator imports.

In the mid-1980s, Mittal transitioned to the telecommunications sector after identifying a market for push-button telephones, which were then uncommon in India. Initially he imported kits for local assembly and introduced India's first push-button phones under the "Mitbrau" brand. He subsequently founded Bharti Telecom Limited (BTL) in 1985. Through a technical partnership with Siemens AG, the company began manufacturing electronic push-button phones under the "Beetel" brand. By 1989, BTL had established a manufacturing facility in Ludhiana and had become one of India's largest domestic telephone producers, with an annual capacity of 200,000 units.

=== 1990–2009: Telecommunications and diversification ===
In 1990, Bharti expanded its equipment manufacturing through partnerships with Lucky Goldstar and Takacom to produce cordless phones and answering machines, through its Beetel brand.The company shifted toward telecommunications services in 1992, forming a consortium with SFR, Emtel, and MSI to bid for mobile licenses in Indian metropolitan circles. Following the grant of a license, Bharti launched GSM services in Delhi in 1995 under the Airtel brand. The company's international expansion began in 1998 with the launch of mobile services in the Seychelles.

Singtel acquired a stake in Bharti for US$400 million in 2000, which coincided with the launch of the "IndiaOne" service to reduce long-distance tariffs. In February 2002, Bharti went public and launched India's first 100% book-built initial public offering (IPO); around the same time its mobile subscriber base reached two million. During this period, the company expanded beyond voice services into data and enterprise sectors and introduced BlackBerry to the Indian market. In 2004, Bharti Airtel entered a landmark outsourcing model partnering with IBM and Ericsson, for network management, enabling it to scale rapidly while focusing on its core business. By 2005, Airtel was operational in all 23 Indian telecom circles.

In 2007, Bharti partnered with Walmart to enter the Indian retail market and established the financial services venture Bharti AXA. That same year, the group reached the 50 million customer milestone, becoming one of the top five mobile operators globally. Bharti Infratel was formed as a subsidiary for tower infrastructure in 2007. In 2012, Mittal took Bharti Infratel public, raising $760 million. This entity later in 2020 merged Indus Towers to create a mega tower company, along with Vodafone Group. The UK Group held 28.12% stake, while Bharti Airtel owned 36.7%.

In 2008 and 2009, Mittal entered two rounds of merger negotiations with South Africa's MTN Group, although, the discussions did not culminate in a deal. During the same period, Bharti Airtel continued to strengthen its international presence and, in 2009, launched its 2G and 3G services in Sri Lanka.

=== 2010–2019: Global scaling and legal proceedings ===
In 2010, Bharti acquired Zain Group's mobile operations in 15 African countries for US$10.7 billion and acquired a 70% stake in Bangladesh's Warid Telecom. In 2013, the India retail partnership with Walmart was dissolved due to regulatory challenges. In the same year, Bharti Airtel acquired Warid Congo and established Nxtra Data Limited as its data-center arm.

That same year, Mittal was asked to appear before a Delhi court in connection with an investigation into spectrum allocations. The summon was subsequently quashed by the Supreme Court.

By 2015, Bharti Airtel was the third-largest mobile operator globally by subscriber base. That year, Bharti became a founding investor in OneWeb, acquiring a strategic minority stake as part of a global consortium. In 2016, Airtel Payments Bank became the first entity in India to receive a payments bank license from the Reserve Bank of India. In 2019, Airtel Africa completed a dual listing - on the London and Nigerian Stock Exchanges. It alsoraised US$3.6 billion through a rights issue.

=== 2020–present: Recent developments ===
Following OneWeb’s 2020 bankruptcy filing, Mittal led a successful US$1 billion consortium with the UK government to acquire the company and later became its Executive Chairman. Under his leadership, OneWeb completed its LEO satellite constellation via launches using Russian Soyuz flights and a rocket from the Indian Space Research Organisation (ISRO).

In 2023, OneWeb merged with Eutelsat, with Bharti as the largest shareholder and Mittal as Co-Chair. That year, Bharti consolidated its insurance business by acquiring AXA's 49% stake, making Bharti Life Ventures Private Limited (BLVPL) the sole owner of the company. As of 2026, Prudential Plc has agreed to acquire a majority stake in Bharti Life Insurance. A year earlier, in 2022, Bharti Airtel initiated its 5G rollout in India and secured a US$1 billion investment from Google.

In 2023, Brookfield and Bharti Enterprises closed a deal, valued at approximately ₹5,000 crore, for four marquee commercial properties, including Worldmark assets located in Delhi Aerocity and Gurugram.

In 2024, Bharti Hexacom was listed through a ₹4,275-crore IPO. The same year, Mittal's Bharti Televentures UK acquired a 24.95% stake in the BT Group Plc. In 2025, Bharti emerged as the second-largest shareholder in Sundrop Brands, a listed FMCG entity formed following the combination of Sundrop Brands Limited and Del Monte India.

In March 2026, Sunil Bharti Mittal announced that he will transition from his role as Chairman of Airtel Africa in July 2026.

== Philanthropy ==
In 2000, Mittal established the Bharti Airtel Foundation (formerly the Bharti Foundation). The Foundation's primary initiatives include the Satya Bharti School Program, which manages 155 rural schools, and the Quality Support Program, which works with 1,100 government schools. In 2024, it introduced TheTeacherApp, a free-for-life digital platform for teacher's professional development platform for educators and launched a Bharti Airtel Scholarship Programme for students from diverse socio-economic backgrounds, pursuing technology-focused engineering courses at the NIRF-ranked engineering colleges.

Through the foundation, Mittal has funded and partnered with several higher education institutions, including the Indian Institutes of Technology in Delhi and Mumbai, the Indian School of Business, Plaksha University, Anant University, Chanakya University, the School of Ultimate Leadership (SOUL) and the University of Cambridge.

== Personal life ==
Sunil is married to Nyna Mittal, who is involved in philanthropic work focusing on education. They have three children: a daughter, Eiesha Bharti Pasricha, and twin sons, Kavin Bharti Mittal and Shravin Bharti Mittal. Kavin was the Founder and Chief Executive Officer of Hike, and Shravin is the Founder of Unbound and a director at Bharti Global Ltd. Shravin was involved in Bharti Global's acquisition of OneWeb and the stake acquisition in BT Group Plc.

== Awards and recognition ==
Year	Award	Organisation
2007	Padma Bhushan	Government of India
2008	Chairman's Award	GSM Association
2009	Global Economy Prize	Kiel Institute (Germany)
2010	Philanthropist of the Year	The Asian Awards
2011	INSEAD Business Leader Award	INSEAD
2024	Honorary Knight Commander of the Order of the British Empire (KBE)	Government of the United Kingdom
2026	CII President's Lifetime Achievement Award	Confederation of Indian Industry

=== Honorary degrees ===
- Doctor of Science (Honoris Causa), Indian Institute of Technology Kharagpur
- Doctor of Laws (Honoris Causa), University of Leeds, UK
- Doctor of Civil Law (Honoris Causa), Newcastle University, UK
- Fellow, Indian National Academy of Engineering (inducted 2023)
- Doctor Honoris Causa, ESCP Business School, ESCP Europe, Paris
- Doctor of Business Administration (Honoris Causa), University of Bath, UK

== Industry associations and affiliations ==
- Chairman, GSM Association (2017–2019)
- Chairman, International Chamber of Commerce (ICC) (2016–2018); Honorary Chairman, ICC (2018–2020)
- Principal, World Bank Group's Private Sector Investment Lab (2025–present)
- Chair, World Economic Forum's Telecommunications Steering Committee
- Member, International Business Council, World Economic Forum
- Member, Board of Directors, Qatar Foundation Endowment
- Member, Board of Directors, SoftBank Corp. (2011–2013)
- Member, Board of Directors, Unilever PLC and Unilever NV (2011–2013)
- Member, International Advisory Committee to the Board of Directors, NYSE Euronext (2008–2011)
- Member, Board of Directors, Standard Chartered Bank Plc (2007–2009)
- President, Confederation of Indian Industry (CII) (2007–2008)
- Co-chairman, Annual Meeting, World Economic Forum, Davos (2007)
- Member, Board of GSM Association (2003–2007)
- Founding Chairman, Cellular Operators Association of India (COAI)
- Chair, B20 India Action Council on African Economic Integration: An Agenda for Global Business (2023)
- Co-chair, Trade & Investment Development Task Force, B20 Argentina (2018) Co-chair, Trade & Investment Development Task Force, B20 Germany (2017)
- Co-chair, SME Development Taskforce, B20 China (2016)
