= Hike =

Hike may refer to:

- Hiking, walking lengthy distances in the countryside or wilderness
- Hiking (sailing), moving a sailor's body weight as far to windward (upwind) as possible, in order to counteract the force of the wind pushing sideways against the boat's sails
- Alternative spelling for Heka (god), an Egyptian god
- Hike (American football), another word for "snap"
- Hike (dog mushing), a command to a dog team
- Hike Messenger, a messaging application
- Hike, a type of mythic humanoids, which are fairies disguised as birds. Also referred to as "hikry" or "hyty".
