= As I See It =

2011 book by L. K. Advani

- First edition
- Author: L.K. Advani
- Language: English
- Publisher: Rupa Publications
- Publication date: 2011
- Publication place: India
- Media type: Print (paperback)
- Pages: 403
- ISBN: 978-81-291-1876-9

As I See It is a 2011 Indian book by politician L. K. Advani, who served as the Deputy Prime Minister of India and former president of Bharatiya Janata Party (BJP). The book explains various issues that riveted the nation present time from Lokpal Bill to Indian currency in Swiss Banks. A collection of LK Advani's blog posts the book analyses several volatile matters of Indian politics. His 50 years of experience in the functioning of the Indian political system is reflected in this piece.
