= L. K. Advani =

Deputy Prime Minister of India from 2002 to 2004

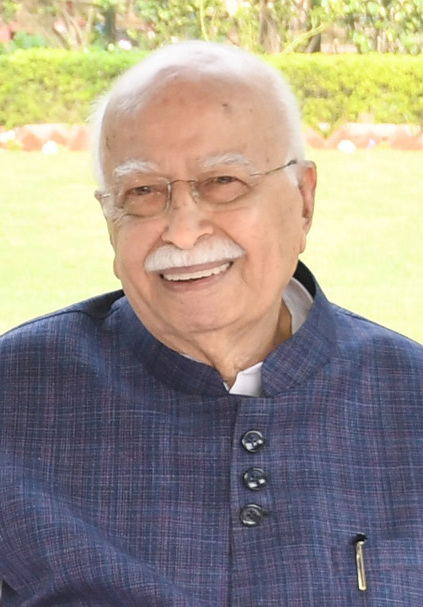
- L. K. Advani in 2022

Deputy Prime Minister of India
- In office 29 June 2002 – 22 May 2004
- Prime Minister: Atal Bihari Vajpayee
- Preceded by: Devi Lal (1991)
- Succeeded by: Vacant

Union Minister of Home Affairs
- In office 19 March 1998 – 22 May 2004
- Prime Minister: Atal Bihari Vajpayee
- Preceded by: Indrajit Gupta
- Succeeded by: Shivraj Patil

16th Union Minister of Coal and Mines
- In office 1 July 2002 – 26 August 2002
- Prime Minister: Atal Bihari Vajpayee
- Preceded by: Atal Bihari Vajpayee
- Succeeded by: Uma Bharati

17th Union Minister of Personnel, Public Grievances and Pensions
- In office 29 January 2003 – 21 May 2004
- Prime Minister: Atal Bihari Vajpayee
- Preceded by: Atal Bihari Vajpayee
- Succeeded by: Manmohan Singh

6th Leader of the Opposition in Lok Sabha
- In office 22 May 2004 – 21 December 2009
- Prime Minister: Manmohan Singh
- Preceded by: Sonia Gandhi
- Succeeded by: Sushma Swaraj
- In office 24 December 1990 – 25 July 1993
- Prime Minister: Chandra Shekhar; P. V. Narasimha Rao
- Preceded by: Rajiv Gandhi
- Succeeded by: Atal Bihari Vajpayee

Member of Parliament, Lok Sabha
- In office 28 February 1998 – 23 May 2019
- Preceded by: Vijay Patel
- Succeeded by: Amit Shah
- Constituency: Gandhinagar, Gujarat
- In office 26 November 1989 – 7 May 1996
- Preceded by: Krishna Chandra Pant
- Succeeded by: Rajesh Khanna
- Constituency: New Delhi, Delhi

2nd President of the Bharatiya Janata Party
- In office 2004–2005
- Preceded by: Venkaiah Naidu
- Succeeded by: Rajnath Singh
- In office 1993–1998
- Preceded by: Murli Manohar Joshi
- Succeeded by: Kushabhau Thakre
- In office 1986–1991
- Preceded by: Atal Bihari Vajpayee
- Succeeded by: Murli Manohar Joshi

5th Leader of the Opposition in Rajya Sabha
- In office 21 January 1980 – 7 April 1980
- Vice President: Mohammad Hidayatullah
- Preceded by: Kamalapati Tripathi
- Succeeded by: P. Shiv Shankar

11th Union Minister of Information & Broadcasting
- In office 24 March 1977 – 28 July 1979
- Prime Minister: Morarji Desai
- Preceded by: Vidya Charan Shukla
- Succeeded by: Purushottam Kaushik

Member of Parliament, Rajya Sabha
- In office 3 April 1988 – 30 November 1989
- Preceded by: Hans Raj Bhardwaj
- Succeeded by: Jinendra Kumar Jain
- Constituency: Madhya Pradesh
- In office 3 April 1982 – 2 April 1988
- Preceded by: Sawai Singh Sisodiya
- Succeeded by: Radhakishan Malviya
- Constituency: Madhya Pradesh
- In office 3 April 1976 – 2 April 1982
- Preceded by: Devdatt Kumar Kikabhai Patel
- Succeeded by: Kumud Ben Joshi
- Constituency: Gujarat

Personal details
- Born: Lal Krishna Advani; 8 November 1927 (age 99) Karachi, Bombay Presidency, British India (present–day Sindh, Pakistan)
- Party: Bharatiya Janata Party (since 1980)
- Other political affiliations: Janata Party (1977–1980); Bharatiya Jana Sangh (1951–1977)
- Spouse: Kamla Advani (m. 1965; died 2016)
- Children: 2, including Pratibha Advani
- Education: St. Patrick's High School, Karachi; Government Law College, Mumbai
- Occupation: Journalist; diplomat; trade unionist; politician
- Awards: Bharat Ratna (2024); Padma Vibhushan (2015)

Lal Krishna Advani (born 8 November 1927) is an Indian lawyer, journalist, trade unionist and politician who served as the 7th deputy prime minister of India from 2002 to 2004. In 2024, he was awarded India's highest civilian honour, the Bharat Ratna, for his monumental contributions to the nation. He is one of the co-founders of the Bharatiya Janata Party (BJP) and a lifelong member of the Rashtriya Swayamsevak Sangh (RSS), a Hindutva organisation. He was the longest serving Minister of Home Affairs serving for 6 years and 64 days from 1998 to 2004, until his protége Amit Shah overtook him in 2025. He is also the longest serving Leader of the Opposition in the Lok Sabha, as well as the longest serving President of the BJP. He was the BJP's prime ministerial candidate during the 1989, 1991, and 2009 general elections.

Advani was born in Karachi and migrated to India during the Partition of India and settled down in Bombay where he completed his college education. Advani joined the RSS in 1941 at the age of fourteen and worked as a pracharak (RSS officer) in Rajasthan. In 1951, Advani became a member of the Bharatiya Jana Sangh party founded by Syama Prasad Mookerjee and performed various roles, including supervisor of parliamentary affairs, general secretary, and president of the Delhi unit. In 1967, he was elected as the chairman of the First Delhi metropolitan council and served till 1970 while becoming a member of the RSS national executive. In 1970, Advani became a member of the Rajya Sabha for the first time and would go on to serve four terms until 1989. He became the president of Jan Sangh in 1973, and it merged into the Janata Party before the 1977 general election. Following the Janata party's victory in the elections, Advani became the union minister for Information and Broadcasting and leader of the house in Rajya Sabha.

In 1980, Lal Krishna was one of the founding members of the BJP along with Atal Bihari Vajpayee and served as the president of the party three times. He was elected to the Lok Sabha for the first time in 1989 where he served seven terms. In 1992, he was alleged to have been part of the Demolition of the Babri Masjid, but was acquitted by the courts due to lack of evidence. Following the same, he was one of the chief proponents of the movement to build a temple over the disputed Ram Janmabhoomi site in Ayodhya and the subsequent rise of Hindutva, a Hindu nationalist ideology, in the late 1990s. He has served as leader of opposition in both the houses. He was the minister of home affairs from 1998 to 2004 and deputy prime minister from 2002 to 2004. He served in the Indian parliament until 2019 and is credited for rise of BJP as a major political party. In 2015, he was awarded the Padma Vibhushan, India's second highest civilian honour and in 2024, he was conferred with Bharat Ratna, India's highest civilian honour.

== Early and personal life ==
Advani was born on 8 November 1927 in Karachi, British India, in a Sindhi Hindu Lohana family to Kishanchand D. Advani and Gyani Devi. His father was a businessman. He has a younger sister named Sheela.

Advani was educated at St. Patrick's High School, Karachi, and D. G. National College in Hyderabad, Sindh. His family was forced to flee Sindh and came to India during the partition of India and settled in Mumbai, where he graduated in law from the Government Law College.

Advani married Kamla Advani in February 1965, and had a son, Jayant, and a daughter, Pratibha. Pratibha is a television producer who also supported her father during Advani's active politics. His wife died on 6 April 2016 due to old age. Advani resides in Delhi.

L. K. Advani (right) with his family during his childhood.

== Early political career ==
=== 1941–1951: Early years ===
Advani joined the Rashtriya Swayamsevak Sangh (RSS) in 1941 at the age of fourteen. He became a pracharak (full-time worker) conducting shakhas and became the secretary of the Karachi unit in 1947. After the partition of India, Advani was a pracharak in Rajasthan working across Alwar, Bharatpur, Kota, Bundi and Jhalawar districts until 1952.

=== 1951–1970: Jan Sangh and Delhi council chairman ===
Advani became a member of the Bharatiya Jana Sangh (BJS), a political party founded in 1951 by Syama Prasad Mookerjee in collaboration with the RSS. He was appointed as the secretary to S. S. Bhandari, then general secretary of the Jan Sangh in Rajasthan. In 1957, he moved to Delhi and became the general secretary and later, president of the Delhi unit of the Jana Sangh. From 1966 to 1967 he served as the leader of BJS in the Delhi Metropolitan Council (DMC). After the 1967 Delhi Metropolitan Council election, he was elected as the chairman of the council and served until 1970. He also assisted K. R. Malkani with the publication of Organiser, the weekly newsletter of the RSS and became a member of its national executive in 1966.

=== 1971–1975: Parliament entry and Jan Sangh leader ===
In 1970, Advani became a member of the Rajya Sabha from Delhi for the six-year tenure. In 1973, he was elected as the president of BJS at the Kanpur session of the party working committee meeting.

=== 1976–1980: Janata party and cabinet minister ===
Advani was reelected to the Rajya Sabha from Gujarat in 1976 for the second time. After the imposition of The Emergency and a crackdown on opposition parties by then-prime minister, Indira Gandhi, BJS and other opposition parties merged to form the Janata Party. In the 1977 election, the Janata Party won a landslide victory due to the widespread unpopularity of the state of emergency imposed by Indira Gandhi. Morarji Desai became the prime minister with Advani becoming the Minister of Information and Broadcasting. The government did not complete its five year term and was dissolved to call fresh elections in 1980 where Janata Party lost to the Indian National Congress. Subsequently, Advani became the leader of opposition in Rajya Sabha.

== Formation of BJP ==
=== 1980–1989: Early years ===
On 6 April 1980, Advani along with few of the erstwhile members of the Jana Sangh quit the Janata Party and formed the Bharatiya Janata Party, with Atal Bihari Vajpayee as its first president. Though the previous government lasted briefly from 1977 till 1980 and was marred with factional wars, the period saw a rise in support for the RSS which culminated into the formation of the BJP. In 1982, he was elected to the Rajya Sabha for the third time from Madhya Pradesh representing the BJP. BJP won only two seats in the 1984 election with the Congress winning a landslide on the back of a sympathy wave due to the assassination of Indira Gandhi. This failure led to a shift in the party's stance with Advani being appointed party president and the BJP turning to Hindutva ideology of Jana Sangh.

Under Advani, BJP became the political face of the Ayodhya dispute over the Ram Janmabhoomi site when the Vishwa Hindu Parishad (VHP) began a movement for the construction of a temple dedicated to the Hindu deity Rama at the site of the Babri Masjid in Ayodhya. The dispute centered on the basis of the belief that the site was the birthplace of Rama, and that a temple once stood there that had been demolished by the Mughal emperor Babur with the Archaeological Survey of India (ASI) supporting the claim. BJP supported the campaign and made it a part of their election manifesto for the 1989 elections, helping it win 86 seats with Advani getting elected to the Lok Sabha for the first time. Advani became the leader of opposition in Lok Sabha when VP Singh formed the National Front government.

=== 1990–1997: Rath yatras and rise of BJP ===
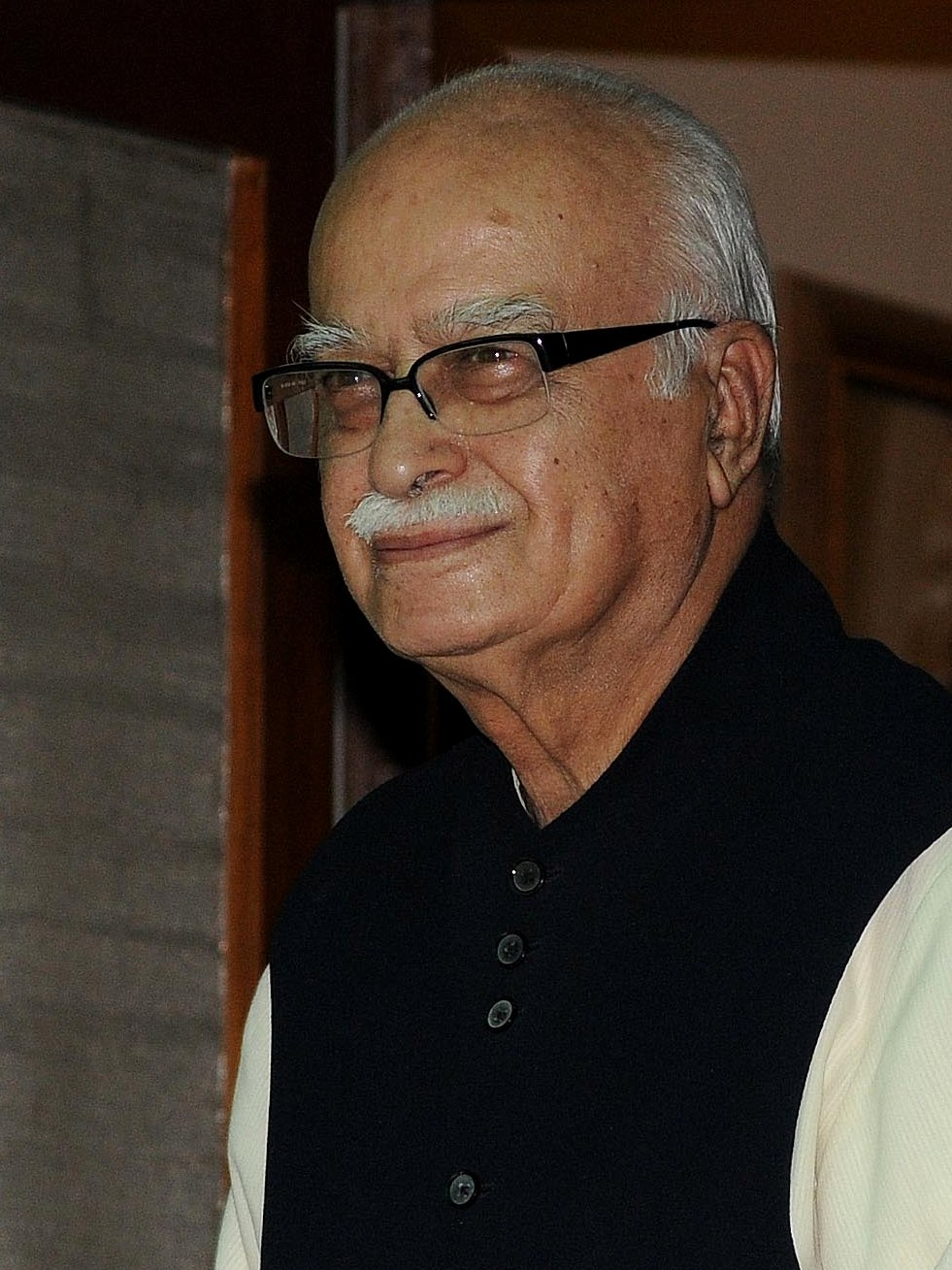
Advani in 2009

Advani often organised rath yatras or processions to boost the popularity of the BJP and unify Hindutva ideology. He organised six rath yatras across the country with the first one in 1990.

1. Ram Rath Yatra: Advani started his first yatra from Somnath in Gujarat on 25 September 1990 which concluded at Ayodhya on 30 October 1990. The procession was linked to the dispute at Ram Janmabhoomi site at Ayodhya and was stopped in Bihar by then Chief Minister Lalu Yadav with Advani himself being arrested on the orders of V. P. Singh, then Prime Minister of India.
2. Janadesh Yatra: Four processions starting on 11 September 1993 from four corners of country were organised and Advani led the yatra from Mysore in South India. Traversing through 14 states and two Union Territories, the processions were organised with the purpose to seek the people's mandate against the two bills, the Constitution 80th Amendment Bill and the Representation of People (Amendment) Bill and congregated at Bhopal on 25 September.
3. Swarna Jayanti Rath Yatra: The procession was organised between May and July 1997 and was conducted in celebration of 50 years of Indian Independence and to project the BJP as a party committed to good governance.
4. Bharat Uday Yatra: The yatra took place in the run-up to the 2004 election.
5. Bharat Suraksha Yatra: The BJP launched a nationwide mass political campaign from 6 April to 10 May 2006 consisting of two yatras – one led by Advani from Dwraka in Gujarat to Delhi and the other led by Rajnath Singh from Puri to Delhi. The yatra was focused on fighting left wing terrorism, minority politics, price rise and corruption, protection of democracy.
6. Jan Chetna Yatra: The last of the yatras was launched on 11 October 2011 from Sitab Diara in Bihar for the purposes of mobilising public opinion against perceived corruption of the then-ruling UPA government and promoting the BJP's agenda of good governance and anti-corruption.

In 1990, Advani embarked on Ram Rath Yatra, a procession with a chariot to mobilise volunteers for Ram Janmabhoomi movement. The procession began from Somnath in Gujarat and headed to converge at Ayodhya. In the 1991 general election, the BJP became the second largest party after the Congress with Advani winning for the second time from Gandhinagar and becoming the leader of opposition again. In 1992, Babri Masjid was demolished Anju Gupta, a senior police officer stated that although Advani was not involved directly, he allegedly delivered a provocative speech prior to the demolition. Advani was among the accused in the demolition case but was acquitted on 30 September 2020 by a CBI special court. In the judgement, it was mentioned that the demolition was not pre-planned and that Advani was trying to stop the mob and not incite them.

In the 1996 general election, the BJP became the single largest party and was consequently invited by the president to form the government. Advani did not contest the elections over allegations of involvement in the Hawala scandal, and resigned his seat on 16 January 1996, but was later cleared of charges by the Supreme Court. While Vajpayee was sworn in as prime minister in May 1996, the government collapsed after just thirteen days.

== 1998–2004: Home minister and deputy prime minister ==
In the 1998 general election, the BJP-led National Democratic Alliance (NDA), came to power with Vajpayee returning as prime minister in March 1998. Advani was elected to the Lok Sabha for the third term and became the Home Minister. However, the government again collapsed after only thirteen months when All India Anna Dravida Munnetra Kazhagam (AIADMK) under J. Jayalalithaa withdrew its support to the government. With fresh elections being called, the BJP-led NDA again won a majority in the 1999 general election and Advani won from Gandhinagar for a fourth term. He assumed the office of Home Minister and was later elevated to the position of Deputy Prime Minister in 2002. During 2002 Gujarat riots, Prime minister Vajpayee actually wanted to remove then chief minister of Gujarat-Advani's protegee Narendra Modi from post, but advani prevented him from doing that. In 2003, news reports suggested a tussle within the BJP with regard to sharing of leadership between Prime Minister Atal Bihari Vajpayee and Advani. BJP president Venkaiah Naidu had suggested that Advani must lead the party politically at the 2004 general elections, referring to Vajpayee as vikas purush, Hindi for development man, and Advani as loh purush, iron man. When Vajpayee subsequently threatened retirement, Naidu backtracked, announcing that the party would contest the elections under the twin leadership of Vajpayee and Advani.

== 2004–2009: Opposition leader ==
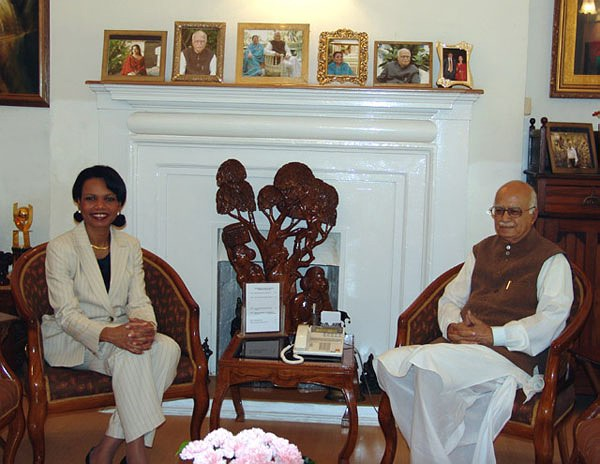
Advani with then US Secretary of State Condoleezza Rice in 2005

In the 2004 general election, the BJP suffered a defeat with United Progressive Alliance led by the Congress coming to power, with Manmohan Singh as prime minister. Advani won his fifth term to the Lok Sabha and became the leader of opposition. Vajpayee retired from active politics after the 2004 defeat, promoting Advani to lead the BJP. In June 2005, while on a visit to Karachi, Advani described Mohammad Ali Jinnah as a secular leader, which led to criticism from the RSS. Advani was forced to resign as BJP president but withdrew the resignation a few days later. In April 2005, RSS chief K. S. Sudarshan opined that Advani should step aside. At the silver jubilee celebrations of the BJP in Mumbai in December 2005, Advani stepped down as party president and Rajnath Singh from Uttar Pradesh was elected in his place. In March 2006, following a bomb blast at a Hindu shrine at Varanasi, Advani undertook a Bharata Suraksha Yatra ('Sojourn for National Security'), to highlight the alleged failure of the ruling United Progressive Alliance in combating terrorism.

== 2009–2015: Prime Minister candidacy and later years ==
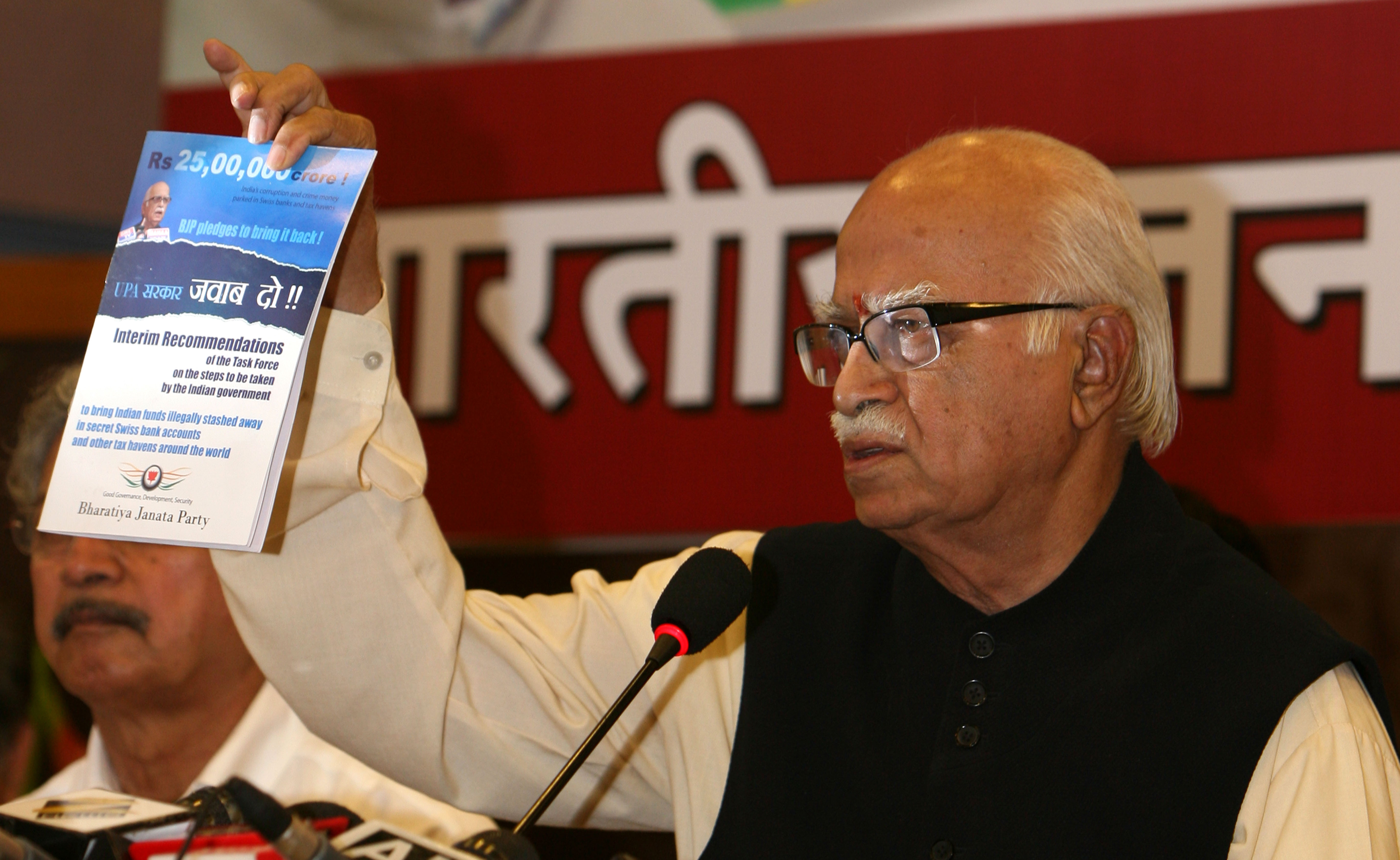
Advani during an election campaign in 2009

In December 2006, Advani stated that as the leader of the opposition in a parliamentary democracy, he considered himself the Prime Ministerial candidate for the next general elections in May 2009. While not everyone was supportive of his candidacy, Vajpayee endorsed Advani's candidacy. On 2 May 2007, BJP President Rajnath Singh stated that Advani is the natural choice for the next prime minister if BJP won the next elections. On 10 December 2007, the Parliamentary Board of BJP formally announced that L. K. Advani would be its prime ministerial candidate for the general elections due in 2009.

Though Advani won his sixth term in Lok Sabha, the BJP lost to Congress and its allies in the 2009 general elections, allowing then incumbent Prime Minister Manmohan Singh to continue in office. Following the defeat in the elections, L. K. Advani handed over the position of leader of opposition to Sushma Swaraj. He was elected working chairman of the National Democratic Alliance in 2010. Advani contested the 2014 general election from Gandhinagar, winning for the fifth consecutive time. Later he was part of the Marg Darshak Mandal (vision committee) of the BJP along with Murli Manohar Joshi and Atal Bihari Vajpayee.

== Elections contested ==
=== Lok Sabha ===
Year	Constituency	Party	Votes	%	Opponent	Opponent party	Opponent votes	%	Result	Margin	%
1989	New Delhi	BJP	129,256	55.54	V. Mohini Giri	INC	97,415	41.85	Won	31,841	13.69
1991	New Delhi	BJP	93,662	43.4	Rajesh Khanna	INC	92,073	42.66	Won	1,589	0.74
1991	Gandhinagar	BJP	356,902	57.97	G. I. Patel	INC	231,223	37.56	Won	125,679	20.41
1998	Gandhinagar	BJP	541,340	59.86	P. K. Datta	INC	264,639	29.26	Won	276,701	30.6
1999	Gandhinagar	BJP	453,299	61.14	T. N. Seshan	INC	264,285	35.65	Won	189,014	25.49
2004	Gandhinagar	BJP	516,120	61.04	Gabhaji Mangaji Thakor	INC	298,982	35.36	Won	217,138	25.68
2009	Gandhinagar	BJP	434,044	54.89	Sureshkumar Chaturdas Patel	INC	312,297	39.49	Won	121,747	15.4
2014	Gandhinagar	BJP	773,539	68.12	Kiritbhai Ishvarbhai Patel	INC	290,418	25.49	Won	483,121	42.54

=== Rajya Sabha ===
Election	Party	Constituency	From	To	Tenure
1970	ABJS	Delhi	3 April 1970	2 April 1976	5 years, 365 days
1976	ABJS	Gujarat	3 April 1976	2 April 1982	5 years, 364 days
1982	BJP	Madhya Pradesh	3 April 1982	2 April 1988	5 years, 365 days
1988	BJP	Madhya Pradesh	3 April 1988	27 November 1989	1 year, 238 days

== Positions held ==
Positions held
Position	Duration
Member, Joint Parliamentary Committee on Maintenance of Heritage Character and Development of Parliament House Complex	October 2014 – May 2019
Chairperson, Committee on Ethics	15 September 2014 – 25 May 2019
Member, Standing Committee on Information Technology	1 September 2014 – 25 May 2019
Member, Committee on Public Undertakings	August 2014 – May 2019
Member, 16th Lok Sabha	June 2014 – May 2019 (7th term)
Member, Joint Parliamentary Committee on Maintenance of Heritage Character and Development of Parliament House Complex	December 2009
Member, Standing Committee on Home Affairs	August 2009
Member, Committee on Installation of Portraits/Statues of National; Leaders and Parliamentarians in Parliament House Complex	August 2009
Leader of Opposition, Lok Sabha	May–December 2009
Member, 15th Lok Sabha	Re-elected in 2009 (6th term)
Member, Standing Committee on Home Affairs	August 2006 – May 2009
Leader of Opposition, Lok Sabha	Unspecified
Member, 14th Lok Sabha	Re-elected in 2004 (5th term)
Minister, Personnel, Pensions and Public Grievances (additional charge)	January 2003 – May 2004
Minister, Coal and Mines (additional charge)	July–August 2002
Deputy Prime Minister	June 2002 – May 2004
Minister, Home Affairs	October 1999 – May 2004
Member, 13th Lok Sabha	Re-elected in 1999 (4th term)
Chairman, Committee on Official Language	Unspecified
Minister, Home Affairs	1998–1999
Member, 12th Lok Sabha	Re-elected in 1998 (3rd term)
President, BJP	1993–1998
Leader of Opposition, Lok Sabha	1991–1993
Member, 10th Lok Sabha	Re-elected in 1991 (2nd term)
Chairman, Committee of Parliament on Pay and Allowances	April–May 1990
Chairman, Committee to Review the Lok Sabha Secretariat	1990–1991
Leader of Opposition, Lok Sabha	Unspecified
Leader, BJP parliamentary party, Lok Sabha	1989–1991
Member, 9th Lok Sabha	Elected in 1989
Member, Rajya Sabha	Re-elected in 1988 (4th term)
President, BJP	1986–1991
Member, Rajya Sabha	Re-elected in 1982 (3rd term)
Leader, BJP, Rajya Sabha	Unspecified
General Secretary, BJP	1980–1986
Leader of Opposition, Rajya Sabha	January–April 1980
Minister, Ministry of Information and Broadcasting	1977–1979
Leader of the House, Rajya Sabha	March 1977 – August 1979
General Secretary, Janata Party	1977–1980
Member, Rajya Sabha	Re-elected in 1976 (2nd term)
Leader, BJS, Rajya Sabha	1974–1976
President, BJS	1973–1977
Member, Rajya Sabha	Elected in 1970
President, BJS, Delhi	1970–1972
Chairman, Delhi Metropolitan Council	1967–1970
Leader, BJS, Interim Metropolitan Council	1966–1967
Secretary, RSS, Karachi	1947

== Awards and honours ==
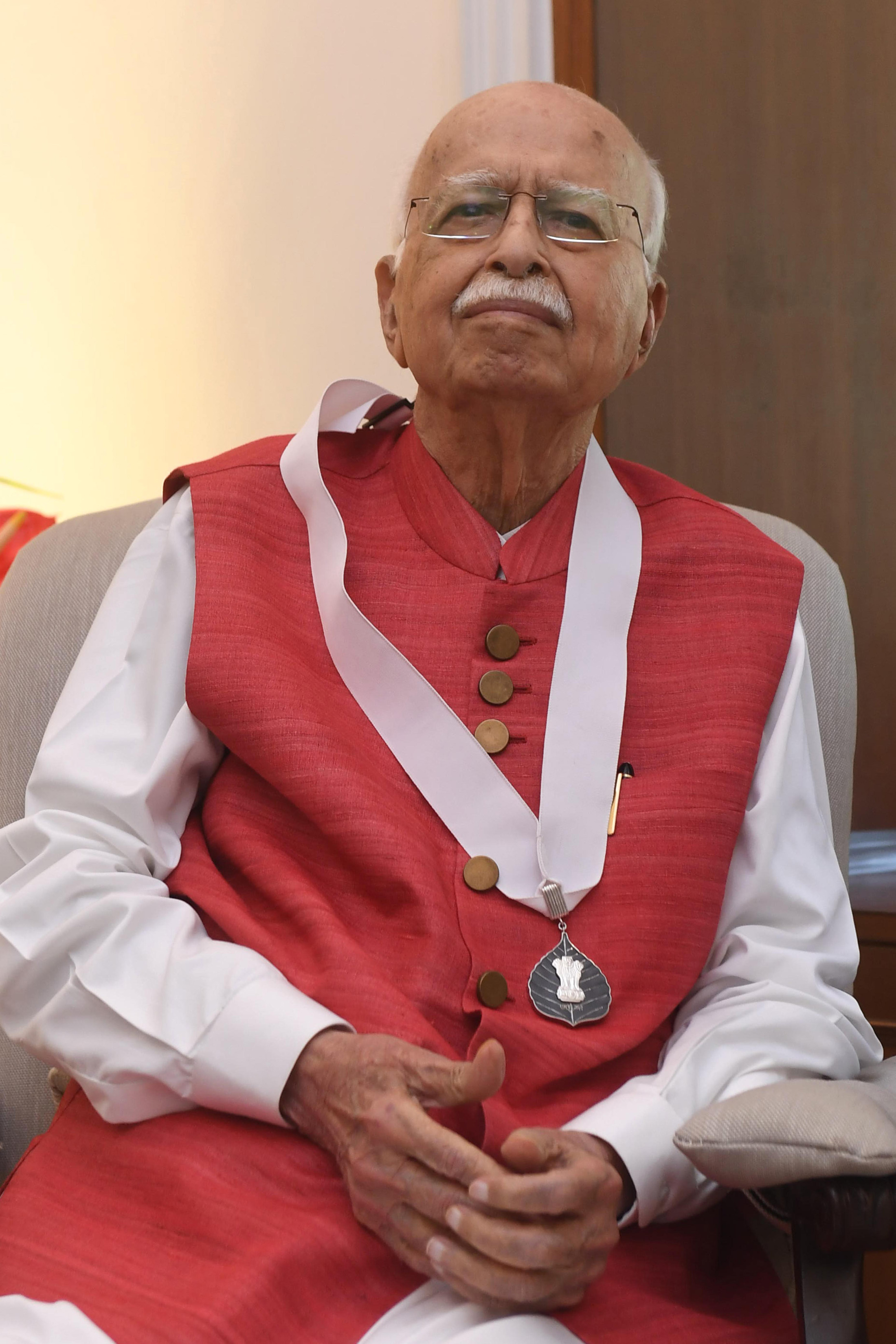
Advani receiving the Bharat Ratna award in 2024

- India:
  - Bharat Ratna (9 February 2024)
  - Padma Vibhushan (2015)

== Bibliography ==
- A Prisoner's Scrap-Book (2002) ISBN 978-81-88322-10-7
- New Approaches to Security and Development (2003) ISBN 978-981-230-219-9
- My Country My Life (2008) ISBN 978-81-291-1363-4
- As I See It: LK Advani's Blog Posts (2011) ISBN 978-81-291-1876-9
- Nazarband Loktantra (2016) ISBN 81-7315-399-X
- Drishtikon (2016) ISBN 978-93-5048-142-4
- Rashtra Sarvopari (2014) ISBN 978-93-5048-549-1

== See also ==
- Electoral history of L. K. Advani

Political offices
Preceded by Indrajit Gupta	Minister of Home Affairs; 1998–2004	Succeeded by Shivraj Patil
Preceded by Chaudhary Devi Lal	Deputy Prime Minister of India; 2002–04	Vacant
