= André Simon (wine) =

French-born wine merchant and writer (1877–1970)

- Born: André Louis Simon; 28 February 1877; Paris
- Died: 5 September 1970 (aged 93)
- Occupations: Wine merchant and writer
- Spouse: Edith Symons
- Children: (5) Andre Louis Ernest Henry Simon (son) b.3 Aug 1906 – d.14 Sep 1973; Peter Jerome Simon (son), b.1910, daughter Jeanne and 2 others
- Writing career
- Subjects: Food and wine

André Simon (28 February 1877 – 5 September 1970) was a French-born wine merchant, gourmet, and prolific writer about wine. Hugh Johnson describes him as "the charismatic leader of the English wine trade for almost all of the first half of the 20th century, and the grand old man of literate connoisseurship for a further 20 years".

== Biography ==
Simon was born in Saint-Germain-des-Prés, in the 6th arrondissement of Paris, France. At 17 he was sent to Southampton, England, to learn English, where he met Edith Symons, whom he married in 1900. They had five children: two sons, Andre Louis Ernest Henry, born in 1906 and Peter Jerome, born in 1910, a daughter Madeleine Jeanne V M, b.1912 and two other daughters.

Two years later he became the London agent for the champagne house of Pommery & Greno, based at 24 Mark Lane. Within four years he discovered his talent for writing, with The History of the Champagne Trade in England published in instalments in the Wine Trade Review. In 1908 he created the Wine Trade Club with friends, organising tastings and technical lectures that foreshadowed the Institute of Masters of Wine 45 years later.

This all came to an end in the war of 1914–18, which saw him spend four years in the French Artillery, first as a regimental postman, and later as a liaison officer with the British. In 1919 he bought two homes, 6 Evelyn Mansions near Victoria Station, and Little Hedgecourt, in Felbridge, Surrey. He developed the garden at Little Hedgecourt, turning part of it into a cricket pitch and open-air theatre. However, on 20 September 1931 Britain came off the gold standard, sterling crashed against the French franc, and Simon found himself unable to pay Pommery for his stock. Pommery summarily ended their association on 30 November 1932.

On 23 October 1931, Simon and a group of friends held a dinner in honour of Professor George Saintsbury, author of the classic Notes on a Cellar Book. Although the retired professor would have nothing to do with them, this gathering turned into the Saintsbury Club, which continues to this day. One of those present was A. J. A. Symons (no relation to Simon's wife), a dilettante in the publishing trade whom Simon had met some years earlier. On 20 October 1933, the two established the Wine & Food Society, with Simon as President (and Editor of the Society journal, Wine and Food), and Symons as Secretary handling the business side. The Society held its first banquet at the Savoy in January 1934. With the ending of Prohibition in the United States in 1933, Simon made his first trip to North America the following year. On 11 December 1934, he founded in New York City a branch of what would become the International Wine & Food Society, and branches across the US, Australia and South Africa soon followed. His great friend Symons died of a brain haemorrhage on 26 August 1941, and Simon took over control of the Society from that point. He ceded control of the journal to Condé Nast Publications in 1962. The Spring 1963 edition was the first under its new editor, a former copywriter on Vogue called Hugh Johnson.

André Simon died in 1970. He believed that "a man dies too young if he leaves any wine in his cellar"; there were only two magnums of claret left in his personal cellar at his death. On what would have been his 100th birthday in 1977, 400 guests gathered at the Savoy to drink to his memory with Château Latour 1945 that he had left for the occasion. Despite living in England most of his life, he remained a French citizen and was an Officier de la Légion d'Honneur as well as a CBE.

== Writing ==
After The History of the Champagne Trade in England, Simon wrote perhaps his most distinctive book, The History of the Wine Trade in England from Roman Times to the End of the 17th Century, in three volumes (1906, 1907 and 1909). During World War I he wrote his biggest seller, Laurie's Elementary Russian Grammar, which was printed in huge numbers by the British War Office. After his split with Pommery he was able to devote himself to writing, with A Concise Encyclopedia of Gastronomy selling 100,000 copies. He wrote 104 books during his 66-year writing career. He loved books; in 1919 he published the Bibliotheca vinaria, a 340-page catalogue of the books he had collected for the Wine Trade Club.

As a Frenchman, his English prose was heavily influenced by the man who gave him his first break in writing – A. S. Gardiner of the Wine Trade Review. Simon once described a wine as "a girl of fifteen, who is already a great artist, coming on tip-toe and curtseying herself out with childish grace and laughing blue eyes." Hugh Johnson has called Simon's "figures of speech and choice of phrases deliciously oblique"; Michael Broadbent admires the "pure poetry" of his writing, calling Simon his favourite writer. However, not everyone appreciates such purple prose; Robert Parker developed his 100-point rating scale as a reaction against this style of writing.

== Awards ==
In February 1965, Simon established the André Simon Award for gastronomic literature, with a prize of 100 guineas. The Awards continue to this day, judged by the Trustees of the André Simon Memorial Fund. They are joined by a wine expert and a food expert invited by the Trustees. A shortlist of six food books and six wine books is published in November, with the final Awards made in March. The prize money has increased to £2000 for the winner in each category, and the "Special Commendation" earns £1000.

== See also ==
- List of wine personalities
