= Sat Pal Mittal =

Indian politician

Sat Pal Mittal (1931 – 1992) was an Indian politician from Punjab. He was a councillor of municipal corporation. He was a member of the Punjab Legislative Council (1964–70) and a Deputy Minister in the Government of Punjab. He was elected as a member of the Rajya Sabha for two terms from 1976 to 1982 and again from 1982 to 1988. He was nominated as a member of the same house in 1988 and served till 1992. Mittal was a member of the Indian National Congress and served as the Secretary of Punjab Pradesh Congress Committee in 1972.

His son Sunil Mittal is the founder and chairman of Bharti Enterprises.

He was an attendee of the second Provisional World Parliament held in New Delhi on March 17, 1985.

== Sources ==
- Brief Biodata
