= Hike Messenger =

Instant messaging app

Hike
- Original author: Kavin Bharti Mittal
- Developer: Hike Private Limited
- Release: December 2012; 13 years ago

Final release(s)
- Android: 6.3.95 / June 26, 2020; 6 years ago
- iOS: 6.2.210 / March 23, 2020; 6 years ago
- Written in: Objective C, Swift (for iOS); Java, C++ (for Android); React Native, JavaScript, HTML, Python, Golang, Node.js (for back-end)
- Operating system: Android; iOS; Windows Phone; Web app; Blackberry OS, Symbian S60
- Platform: ARM, x86/x86-64
- Successor: Vibe by hike Rush by hike
- Size: 2278.3 MB (iOS); 75.16 MB (Android)
- Available in: 10 languages
- List of languages English, Bengali, Gujarati, Hindi, Kannada, Malayalam, Marathi, Tamil, Telugu and Sanskrit
- Type: Voice over IP (VoIP); Instant messaging; Video chat; Social media; Image sharing; Multimedia
- License: Freeware
- Website: hike.in

Hike Private Ltd.
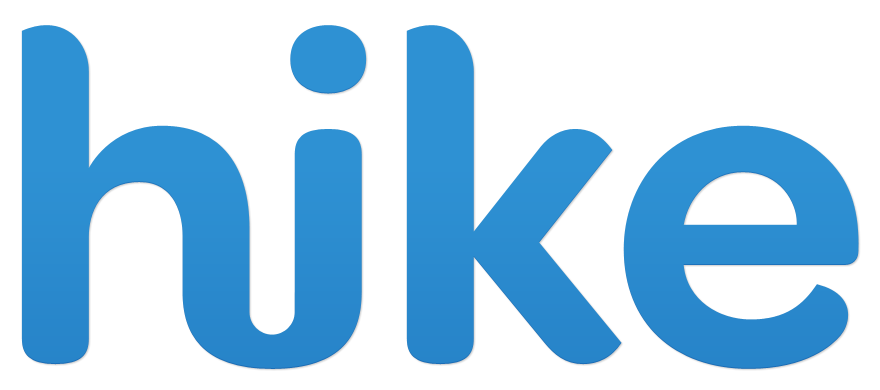
- Type: Private
- Industry: Internet
- Founded: 12 December 2012; 13 years ago
- Founders: Kavin Bharti Mittal
- Defunct: 6 January 2021; 5 years ago
- Headquarters: New Delhi, India
- Number of employees: 160+ (as of October 2021)
- Website: www.hike.in

Hike Messenger, aka Hike Sticker Chat, is a multifunctional Indian social media and social networking service offering instant messaging (IM) and Voice over IP (VoIP) services that was launched on December 11, 2012, by Kavin Bharti Mittal. Hike functioned through SMS. The app registration used a s‍tandard, one-time password (OTP) based authentication process.

== History ==
Hike Messenger was launched on December 12, 2012, by its founder, Kavin Bharti Mittal. The majority of users were from India, with 80% under the age of 25. The company purchased startups like TinyMogul and Hoppr in 2015. After buying US-based free voice calling company Zip Phones, Hike provided VoIP calling services. On March 5, 2015, Hike launched the 'Great Indian Sticker Challenge' to create more stickers. In February 2017, Hike acquired the social networking app Pulse.

From version 5.0, it became the first social messaging app to start a mobile payment service in India. The timeline feature came back after multiple user requests and the introduction of a personalized digital envelope called Blue Packets for sending monetary gifts through a built-in wallet. In 2017, the acquisition of Bengaluru-based startup Creo was announced to enable third-party developers to build services on top of the Hike platform. In 2018, Hike provided 1 billion users with internet access by targeting smaller cities.

In January 2019, the company discarded the previous super-app approach, and began launching specialized apps for specific use-cases. In May 2019, Hike announced a collaboration with Indraprastha Institute of Information Technology, Delhi (IIIT-D) to develop a variety of machine learning models. In April 2019, the company launched its first standalone app, Hike Sticker Chat. A separate content app Hike News & Content was also launched.

In 2021, Hike shut down its messaging service and shifted focus to gaming and community platforms. It launched Rush, a real-money gaming app featuring casual titles like ludo and carrom, which scaled to over 10 million users and generated more than US$500 million in gross revenue over four years. The company also introduced Vibe, an approval-only community app, as part of its pivot away from the super-app and messaging model.

In September 2025, following the passage of the Promotion and Regulation of Online Gaming Act, which banned real-money gaming in India, Hike announced its complete closure. Founder Kavin Bharti Mittal stated that while the company had begun international expansion, scaling globally under the new regulatory regime would require a full reset that was not a viable use of capital or resources.

In 2026, Hike Messenger was relaunched on the Google Play Store and Apple App Store under Hike Messenger Ltd, a United Kingdom-based company incorporated on 30 November 2025. Hike founder Kavin Bharti Mittal stated on X that the Hike brand and app had been sold to the UK company.

== Application ==
=== Timeline of Features ===
On 15 April 2014, Hike introduced unlimited free SMS via a service called Hike Offline, through credits earned by users from regular chatting, as connectivity is still a major issue in many parts of India. In an attempt to appeal to its younger users, Hike introduced features that find resonance with the local market, such as Last Seen Privacy and localized sticker packs. It also introduced a two-way chat theme, allowing users to change the chat background for themselves and for their friends simultaneously. The app also started showing live Cricket scores in collaboration with Cricbuzz, as well as news, casual games, and social media feeds. Hike also added a file transfer service, allowing files less than 100MB of all formats, with a view on further increasing the size limit to 1 GB.

With the launch of version 2.9.2.0 in January 2015, Hike implemented support for sending uncompressed images and a "quick upload" feature optimized for 2G speed. Later that month, Hike introduced a voice calling feature for its users. In September 2015, Hike launched free group call support with up to 100 people in a simultaneous conference call environment. In November 2016, Hike announced the launch of a feature called Stories that allows people to share real-life moments using fun live filters which automatically get deleted after 48 hours, and a new camera design with localized filters. Hike 4.0 launched on 26 August 2015 with the tagline 'Got a Gang? Get on Hike'. Hike 4.0 was an optimization-focused update, increasing the performance of the app on poor networks. It supported photo filters, doodles, and bite-sized news updates in under 100 characters. Hike launched News Feed with Hindi language support on 29 September 2015 to cater for the needs of the non-English population. Hike launched version 3.5 as the biggest update for Windows Phone 8.1 during December 2015 which changed the user interface for more simpler navigation, supported sending unlimited non-media files and documents of any format and better group admin settings. It also included ten brand new chat themes.

Hike launched a microapp feature which was live for two days on 8 May 2016, as a Mother's Day special in which users could add images, quotes or messages as a token of love with customized e-cards and stickers on their timeline not only on Hike, but also on other platforms. On 26 October 2016, Hike Messenger rolled out the beta version of a video calling feature ahead of WhatsApp starting with the Android users which also lets recipients preview a video call before deciding to take it and is optimized to even work under 2G conditions. On 24 December 2016, Hike rolled out a short 20-second Video Stories feature that can be directly shared with friends or posted on a public timeline with different filters in collaboration with content creators with the same 48-hour time limit before being automatically deleted. The Stories feature continues to receive constant future updates to include and enable content, public story option, private user messaging and geo-tagging.

In September 2017, Hike launched personalized sticker packs with 20,000+ graphical stickers for over 500 colleges that covered around 1,000 colleges by December 2018 across India which can be used across different geographies, and are highly customized for users with availability in 40+ local languages that support automatic sticker suggestions where the application suggests the best reply for any sticker message and also allows users to "nudge", a feature used to ping the receiver. Hike started supporting user comments on friend's posts, added a specific message reply function, a redesigned camera interface to support front flash and user mentions with the help of the @ symbol. In December, 2017, Hike launched group voting, bill splitting, checklists and event reminders for group chat that supports up to 1,000 users both on iOS and Android platform. Hike launched another feature called Hike Land, which is a virtual world with beta trial to start from March 2020, that will use Hike Moji where online users with their digital avatar can hang out with other users and will be built inside the Hike Sticker Chat application. It is mainly targeted but not restricted towards 16 to 21 years age group of people. Without unveiling much about Hike Land, a separate website has been created with option to reserve spots by giving details like name, gender and phone number that will link the user profile from the Hike Sticker Chat account though it is not a necessity.

==== Hike Direct ====
The Hike Direct feature is based on the technology known as WiFi Direct, which initially was also called WiFi P2P and got introduced to users by October 2015, which enables sharing of files such as music, apps, videos without a live internet connection within a 100-meter radius by creating a wireless network between two or more devices with a transfer speed of 100MB per minute. For privacy and security reasons, Hike didn't show the recipient's location or proximity and works only when two users are connected in the same room by adding one another into the contact list.

==== Hike Wallet ====
In June 2017, Hike announced the launch of version 5.0 with multiple new features like User Chat Themes, Night Mode and Magic Selfie. along with a built-in Wallet partnered with Yes Bank. This feature was first rolled out to Android users followed by iOS users at a later stage.

Hike collaborated with Airtel Payment Bank to power its digital payment wallet by November 2017 where Hike users have access to Airtel Payments Bank's merchant & utility payment services and know your customer (KYC) infrastructure with 5 million transactions happening from services like recharge and P2P. Hike formed a partnership with Ola Cabs to bring a taxi and auto-rickshaw booking facility from 14 February 2018. With Hike Wallet facility users could now book bus tickets with 3,000 operators and also pay bills for electricity, cooking gas, DTH and landline with 60 operators.

Support of Unified Payments Interface (UPI) based payments by Hike Wallet would let users send and receive up to ₹1 lakh directly into the bank account without sharing their credit/debit card or net banking credentials. Users could send money through UPI to anyone and not just Hike users. For non-UPI users, it allowed transactions up to ₹20,000 a month with a maximum cap per transaction at ₹5,000.

==== Hike ID ====
In January 2018, Hike announced the launch of 'Hike ID' to enhance its user privacy features. Hike ID is a unique custom username that removes the need for sharing phone numbers to chat with someone. Users can also search for each other using their Hike IDs. Hike ID has been integrated across all Hike-based services for facilitating easy discovery of people or groups.

In a survey done by the Hike team out of a million active users, 69 percent confirmed that they like to talk to others without sharing their own phone number and over 72 percent said that they like to skip the step of saving phone numbers before talking to others. This is what prompted the developers to come up with Hike ID as the solution which makes it easier as well as secure for users to chat without having to share or save phone numbers.

==== Hike Web ====
In August 2019, it launched the web app beta version of Hike Sticker Chat, extending the service to desktop browsers. The company also worked on a feature to allow sharing of stickers across messaging platforms. Hike Web incorporated AES-256 encryption and TLS 1.2 to secure communications over the web client.

==== Hike Moji ====
Hike Moji was a digital avatar of a user based on artificial intelligence (AI), natural language processing (NLP) and machine learning (ML) generated imagery created by taking a selfie, for variety of localized Indianised expressions with 1000 customized options like more than 350 hairstyles, 20 different facial features, bindis, local clothing style, nose pins with local twist and mood. The beta version 1.0 was rolled out on 15 November 2019 for both android and iOS. It was officially released to a wider audience base on 19 February 2020. With the stable release, it included 200 more customized options like 20 skin shades, over a million eyes colours, more than 400 accessories, dimples, freckles, cheek-lines and more. Hike Moji generate stickers are on three language where English and Hindi act as default with one other optional Indic language. Right now the language support is limited to Bengali, Gujarati, Kanada, Malayalam, Marathi, Tamil and Telugu. User can share 100+ exclusive Hike Moji stickers to other platforms. Computer vision and deep neural networks enable the platform to search around 100 trillion combinations of facial shape and color reflecting the user's looks within a few seconds. Lifelike images are generated with three seconds. Hike Moji version 1.0 (beta) alone created over 1 million plus stickers upon its launch in a control group of users. The stable version 1.0 can now create 100 quintillion combinations of stickers with seamless addition to WhatsApp. Inspired by local diversity of the country, HikeMoji now is the largest platform for hyper local avatar creation in India.

=== Privacy & Security ===
An article from 10 December 2012 published on German website Spiegel Online where app testers of MediaTest Digital found out while analyzing the data traffic of Hike version 1.0.5 for iOS that it transmits messages, phone numbers and unique device identification number (UDID) unencrypted and has full access to the phone address book. They called out that these deficiencies in Hike are even more undeniable than those made in the past in WhatsApp.

Hike used SSL encryption for the exchange of media and text messages on Wi-Fi. In addition to a user choosing whom to share their last seen and profile pictures with, the app also supports an industry first hidden mode with a pattern lock feature for extended user privacy. As of June 2019, all chats and calls are now being protected by 128-bit Advanced Encryption Standard, and messages stored locally on a device are auto backed-up to its cloud server with zero data consumption. It. The data stored on Hike servers is completely encrypted with an AES-128 algorithm.

=== Platform Support ===
==== Hike Total ====
In January 2018, the company announced the launch of Total which is a customized version of Android that uses its own proprietary technology called UTTP, which is based on Unstructured Supplementary Service Data (USSD) protocol that is supported by nearly all GSM phones that allowed users to access services on their mobile even in the offline mode or without internet. Hike teamed up with mobile carriers and OEMs for Total, with device makers bundling a tweaked version of Android that makes Hike the default text/call app.

The total was targeted at the next billion mobile-first customers. Users can access essential services such as Messaging, News, Horoscope, Recharge, Wallet, Cricket Scores and Rail information even without an active internet connection with services taking less than 100 kb to 1 MB of size. Users can also buy data packs which are as low as ₹1 from within the operating system.

Hike announced Intex Technologies, Karbonn Mobiles as device partners and BSNL, Aircel as telecom service providers. Hike announced the availability of the Total platform for 'Mera Pehla Smartphone' initiative launched by Airtel India. The first batch of handsets supporting the technology were released by March 2018. It wasn't available for download on Google Play as it is exclusive to handset models produced by partner original equipment manufacturers (OEMs).

== User statistics ==
Hike acquired its first five million users within three months after the app launch which increased to fifteen million by September 2013. Up to May 2014, the user base increased to twenty million with additional fifteen million joining till August 2014. Hike reached seventy million users till October 2015 by adding an additional thirty million within three months from August 2015. Twenty billion messages were shared regularly every month till August 2015, that grew to over one billion messages shared every single day by December 2015, that again doubled to forty billion monthly messages till January 2016 as users are spending over 120 minutes per week on the app.

On average, users are spending more than 120 minutes per week on the app as they are viewing 11.2 news stories on average per user per day while transferring close to 10 million files with Hike Direct which is more than 200 terabytes of data without the use of actual internet. As of January 2019, 29 percent of internet users in India use Hike as a messenger or VoIP platform.

Hike crossed over its first hundred million registered users in January 2016 as per founder and company CEO, Kavin Bharti Mittal which added a further sixty million till May 2019. Over ten million mobile transactions were done on Hike as of November 2017 of which 70 percent were for various recharges, while 30 percent were peer to peer transaction (P2P). A further breakdown of 30 percent P2P transactions consists of 10 percent UPI payments, 10 percent Blue Packets which are virtual envelopes that users can insert money into and send to friends with personal messages, filters and 10 percent normal wallet transactions. During this time around Hike also recorded a 30 percent month after month rise in its active user base. Hike Messenger announced that it crossed five million monthly transactions within five months of Hike Wallet's launch at a 30 percent month after month growth which by December 2017 increased to ten million monthly transactions at a 100 percent month after month growth rate.

Around 50,000 users are joining Hike Sticker Chat per day which the company wants to quadruple by the end of 2019. The initial target is capturing of 15 to 20 percent youth population in India and a wider base from tier-1 and tier-2 cities since maximum growth is coming from Pune, Ahmedabad, Mumbai and Jaipur. As of December 2019, the app has over two million weekly active users.

== Funding ==
Hike raised its first round of funding of $7 million from Bharti Enterprises and SoftBank Group in April 2013. It again received a second round of investment of $14 million from Bharti Enterprises and Softbank Group in March 2014 to scale up operations when it crossed 15 million subscribers. In August 2014, Hike reached 35 million users and raised $65 million in a funding round led by Tiger Global. It raised $175 million in a Series D round of funding led by Tencent and Foxconn on 16 August 2016. After raising this round Hike reached the valuation of $1.4 billion and became the youngest startup in India to reach unicorn status, having achieved it in just 3.7 years after launch.

== Controversy ==
Around January 2016, Hike spokesperson told Press Trust of India journalist that Facebook blocked an option in its advertisements which allows people to visit the Hike official website which they initially assumed to be a technical glitch, but later Facebook confirmed that certain products and services can't be advertised on its platform which stopped the Hike ads. Facebook, whose WhatsApp app is a rival service to Hike in the Indian market, has not publicly responded to Hike's allegations.

== April Fools' pranks ==
On April 1, 2014, the app pranked its users with "HikeCoin", which was modeled after Bitcoin for direct cash transfers by announcing that a photo of real monetary note, attached and sent to friends would make the physical note invalid.

On March 31, 2016, Hike announced "Hike Smell", a fictional feature added as a prank on April Fools' Day. Users were informed that by using special sensors in their smartphones, they could capture and attach smells to their messages.

== Shutdown ==
On 6 January 2021, the company announced the end of messaging services effective 14 January 2021 12:00 PM IST by sending the following text to its users:

Today we're announcing that after so many years of helping you deepen friendships, we will be shutting down Hike Sticker Chat at 11.59pm on 14th Jan, 2021.

We thank you for using Hike Sticker Chat over the years.

We wouldn’t be here without each and every one of you.

Hike also announced that all the Hike Stickers could still be used on other messaging platforms such as Signal, WhatsApp, and Telegram by downloading "Stickers by Hike".

== Pivot ==
After officially shutting down Hike Messenger, the company pivoted to build a Web3 ludo gaming platform "Rush Gaming Universe". The whole platform was moved to the blockchain on February 28, 2022. Hike plans to offer the Rush Avatar NFTs for free to the active members of its community, and give access to the rarest editions only to the most active members.
