= Dharshan Munidasa =

Sri Lankan chef (born 1970)

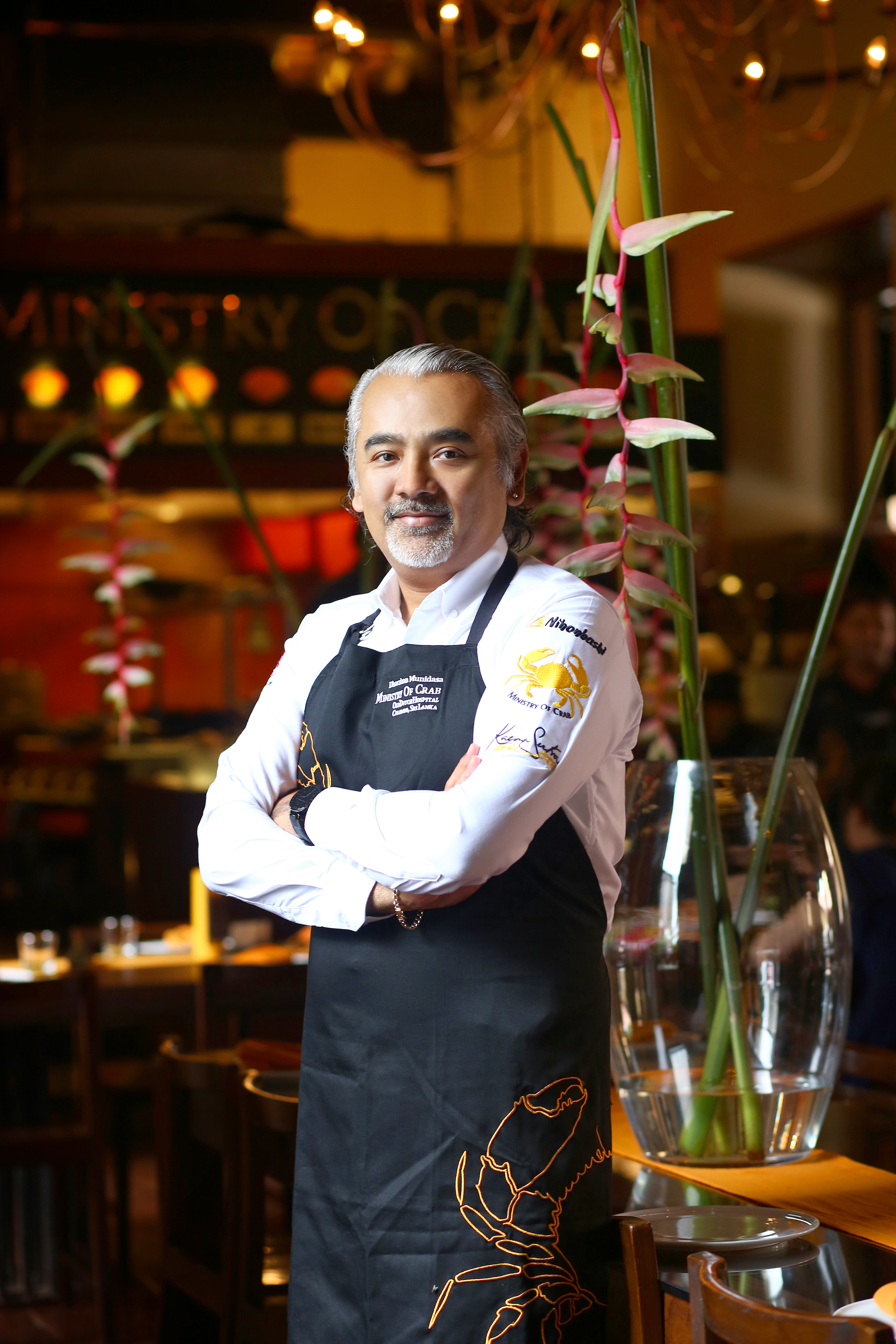
- Born: 9 November 1970 (age 55); Tokyo, Japan
- Education: Johns Hopkins University, Maryland, U.S.
- Occupation: Chef
- Known for: Ministry of Crab Nihonbashi
- Television: Culinary Journeys with Dharshan (2011)
- Children: Shanaia
- Parents: Dr. Milton Munidasa (father); Nobuko Munidasa (mother)

Dharshan Munidasa (born 9 November 1970) is a chef-restauranteur from Sri Lanka.

He is behind some of the most recognised restaurants in the country including Nihonbashi and Ministry of Crab; the only restaurants from Sri Lanka to have ever been ranked on Asia's 50 Best Restaurants List. He was also the host of the popular TV series Culinary Journeys with Dharshan.

Munidasa is a self-taught culinarian, who prides himself on the fact that he never attended culinary school. His efforts in promoting Japanese Cuisine in Sri Lanka earned him recognition from the Japanese Government for which he was awarded The Minister's Award for Overseas Promotion of Japanese Food for the year 2014. In November 2023, he was awarded the Order of the Rising Sun Gold and Silver Rays by the Government of Japan in recognition for his efforts and distinguished contributions to enhancing the bilateral diplomatic relationships between Sri Lanka and Japan.

== Early life and education ==
Dharshan Munidasa was born in Tokyo, Japan to a Japanese mother, Nobuko Munidasa and Sri Lankan father, Dr. Milton Munidasa and spent most of his childhood in Japan, where his earliest experiments in cooking were upon observing his mother and Japanese aunts in the kitchen. He is the eldest of three children; he has a younger brother, Kanishka and a younger sister, Dulee.

After completing his primary and secondary education at St. Joseph's College, Colombo and Wycherley International School, Munidasa went on to graduate with a Double Degree in Computer Engineering and International Relations from The Johns Hopkins University, USA in 1994. It was as a university student that he unearthed his passion for cooking - out of necessity - as he found the commercial cafeteria food uninspiring.

== Career ==
Munidasa returned to the island in 1994, following the death of his father, where the lack of authentic Japanese food in the country, combined with his heritage and passion for pure Japanese culinary fare motivated Munidasa, who had never had any formal culinary training, to open his maiden venture Nihonbashi (meaning "Japan Bridge") in 1995 at Galle Face Terrace.

Nihonbashi, serves inspired fine Japanese cuisine and uses local ingredients to create unique masterpieces stemming from Japanese culinary philosophies. It was the first restaurant in Sri Lanka to be listed on Asia's 50 Best Restaurants List in 2013 and ranking successively until 2018.

Subsequently, he went on to open two more branches of Nihonbashi at Odel, Alexandra Place in 2001 for on-the-go dining and then at Hilton Colombo Residencies in 2002, specializing in tempura. Munidasa has also been invited to prepare Japanese degustation dinners at various establishments in South Asia; including The Conrad, The Four Seasons, Hilton, Huvafen Fushi and the Six Senses properties, all in the Maldives and for the International Wine and Food Society in Mumbai.

In December 2011, Munidasa in collaboration with close friends, Sri Lankan Cricketing Legends Mahela Jayawardene and Kumar Sangakkara opened Ministry of Crab, housed in the recently refurbished 400-year-old Old Dutch Hospital Shopping Precinct. This restaurant has the distinction of being one of the first in the country dedicated to serving the freshest export quality lagoon crabs, which heroes the island's iconic Mud Crab. Ministry of Crab now has eight overseas outposts to its name, located in Shanghai, Chengdu, Mumbai, Maldives, Bangkok, Singapore, Kuala Lumpur and Melbourne.

In 2011, Nihonbashi became one of only two Sri Lankan restaurants selected to be featured in the 2011/2012 edition of the Miele Guide (Asia's first independent restaurant guide). In their 2013 Edition, Munidasa had the privilege of gaining both the coveted first and second place in Sri Lanka for the outstanding cuisine at both the Ministry of Crab and Nihonbashi, respectively.

Nihonbashi also earned the prestige of being the first Sri Lankan restaurant to make it onto Asia's 50 Best Restaurants List and ranked consecutively on it from 2013 to 2018, Ministry of Crab also had the honour of being ranked on this prestigious list from 2015 to 2022. Further, in the 2016 edition of this list, Ministry of Crab took the title of The S. Pellegrino Best Restaurant in Sri Lanka, which was also held consecutively till 2022.

As recognition for his contribution to Japanese Culture, Munidasa was awarded the Japanese Ambassador's Special Commendation by the Japanese Embassy in Sri Lanka, in December 2013. Dharshan was also recognized by the Japanese government when he was awarded The Minister's Award for Overseas Promotion of Japanese Food for the year 2014, becoming one of the five people in the world to be given this prestigious award that year.

In July 2014, Munidasa opened his third restaurant Kaema Sutra, in partnership with Bollywood Actress Jacqueline Fernandez, plating up contemporary Sri Lankan cuisine.

In 2014 Dharshan established The Tuna & The Crab in Galle at Dutch Hospital (Galle Fort) in the South of Sri Lanka; a hybrid Japanese and Seafood restaurant that combines the best of Nihonbashi and Ministry of Crab. This was his first restaurant venture outside the capital city of Colombo.

Dharshan also launched his own green juice which utilizes Gotukola as its primary ingredient. Gotukola juices and the various methods of preparation have been a part of tradition for a long time in Sri Lanka. Dharshan's Gotukola drink is named Centella after its scientific name and contains no water and no added sugars or sweeteners.

In 2017, Munidasa was awarded the Business Today Passionate Award, which recognized pioneering individuals, who single-handedly created novel concepts and succeeded in making them a reality and who have driven the economy of Sri Lanka in the same manner as the corporate sector. Having opened Café Nihonbashi at the Radh Hotel in Kandy (2018), Dharshan introduced Casual Washoku to the hill capital of Sri Lanka, serving a selection of signature Japanese dishes in an informal setting.

Munidasa expanded Ministry of Crab on an international level by opening the first overseas restaurant in Shanghai at the People's Park in October 2018. In 2019, Ministry of Crab opened four more restaurants - Ministry Crab Manila at Shangri-La, at the Fort Hotel in January, Ministry of Crab Mumbai at the Zaveri House in Khar in February, Ministry of Crab Maldives at the Marina @ CROSSROADS in October and Ministry of Crab Bangkok in Sukhumvit Soi - 31 in December.

In 2020, Dharshan expanded Nihonbashi to the Maldives, with the launch of Nihonbashi Blue at The Marina @ CROSSROADS an integrated leisure and entertainment development undertaken in the country (and where Ministry of Crab Maldives is also situated). Nihonbashi Blue offers a sophisticated cuisine philosophy inspired by the principles of Washoku and emulates its Colombo flagship, with its sake bar, tatami-seating area and sushi counter with dedicated sushi chefs.

Also at CROSSROADS, Maldives is Carne Diem Grill, Dharshan's steakhouse. It is built around a unique charcoal grill oven 'Ignis Maximus' created by Dharshan himself, which is based on the principles of the charcoal yakitori grills of Japan. The meat is skewered and exposed to the direct radiation of the embers as the oven creates a high cooking temperature of 750°C. This cooks a steak in a matter of minutes.

Munidasa expanded Ministry of Crab to Chengdu in 2022. Located on Jiaozi Avenue, it is just steps from the city's famous landmark, Twins Towers. It is a unique two-level glass house featuring a restaurant on the second floor that offers fresh Sri Lankan Mud Crab in distinctive flavours along with signature cocktails

Ministry of Crab opened in Sinagpore in 2024 in a standalone colonial building at Dempsey Hill, the country’s premier lifestyle destination as part of its mission to share the goodness of Sri Lankan mud crabs with the rest of the world.

In 2025, Munidasa opened two more international outposts, in Kuala Lumpur and Melbourne, respectively. Ministry of Crab's Malaysian outpost opened in February at TUAH 1895 @ Bukit Bintang City Centre, in the heart of the city. Ministry of Crab Melbourne is located at 226, Flinders Lane, one of the city’s most popular culinary hotspots, known for its mix of eclectic, high-end, and inventive dining experiences.

== Television ==
Munidasa made his first television appearance in 2009 on the Sri Lanka episode of Rick Stein's Far Eastern Odyssey on BBC.

In 2010, Munidasa paired up with leading English Channel ETV to co-produce and host "Culinary Journeys with Dharshan", a culinary travelogue that took viewers a step forward beyond an ordinary culinary experience, to places far and wide in search of the best sources for the finest ingredients in Sri Lankan and Japanese cuisine. The show which was mainly filmed in Sri Lanka and Japan ran for two seasons until 2011. An episode of this show which was filmed in Singapore around the famous Chilli Crab made with exported Sri Lankan mud crab, was consequently what inspired Munidasa to open a restaurant which pays homage to the Sri Lankan mud crab in their home country.

Munidasa was one of five chefs and the first non-Japanese chef featured on season two of Nippon Shokudo for TV Tokyo in 2011. The episode focused on Nihonbashi Restaurant and Japanese Cuisine in Sri Lanka.

In 2017, he appeared Season 10's episode 6 of Anthony Bourdain: Parts Unknown airing on CNN.

== Affiliations ==
Dharshan has prepared degustation menus in various establishments across the world, Crown Towers in Melbourne, the World Gourmet Summit in Singapore, Mandarin Oriental in Bangkok, Anantara The Palm Dubai Resort in UAE, the Regent in Taiwan, Cheval Blanc Randheli Resort, Waldorf Astoria Maldives Ithaafushi, Four Seasons Hotel Hangzhou At West Lake, and Shangri-La Hotels in London, Tokyo, Paris, Abu Dhabi and Hong Kong.

2014 - Munidasa was named as a Cool Japan Ambassador by the Japanese Government for his work towards the promotion of Japanese cuisine outside of Japan.

2021 - Dharshan was appointed as a 'Japanese Cuisine Goodwill Ambassador' by the Ministry of Agriculture, Forestry and Fisheries in Japan, for his continuous effort toward the dissemination of Japanese food and dietary culture overseas.

2023 - Munidasa received the honour of being conferred 'The Order of the Rising Sun, Gold and Silver Rays' by the Government of Japan in recognition of his distinguished contributions towards promoting Japanese Food Culture in Sri Lanka as well as contributions to enhancing the bilateral diplomatic relationships between Sri Lanka and Japan through ways of cultural exchange.

2024 (Present) - Dharshan is a member of the presidential committee to make recommendations for the establishment of Sri Lanka as a major tourist destination.
