= Pratibha Advani =

Indian television presenter

- Occupations: Television presenter, producer
- Father: L. K. Advani

Pratibha Advani is an Indian television presenter, talk show host and producer. She is the daughter of L. K. Advani, a former Deputy Prime Minister of India. She has worked in television journalism, current-affairs programming and entertainment production. She is associated with Swayam Infotainment, a media production company, and has presented programmes covering Hindi film industry and interviews with film personalities.

== Career ==
=== Television journalism ===
In 1994, advani began working in television after returning to New Delhi. She started her career with JAIN TV, where she worked on the weekly investigative programme Khoj. She subsequently worked in television news and current-affairs programming, including assignments with Asian Television Network and the Asian News International.

In 1996 Indian general election from Moscow and Singapore, She reported and also presented South Asia Newsline, a news programme broadcast on Sony for audiences in the United Kingdom and the United States, and anchored Asia AM, a current-affairs programme for Doordarshan International.

Her other television work included Ghoomta Aaina, a weekly programme broadcast on DD National and DD News, and Newsmakers, for which she produced and presented 26 episodes.

=== Television production and presenting ===
Advani was associated with Swayam Infotainment, a television production company that produced programmes for Indian television channels. In a 2005 interview with Rediff.com, she said that the company had produced programmes for several television channels and that she had produced and hosted 150 episodes of the celebrity talk show Swayam on SAB TV.

She also presented Namaste Cinema, a programme focusing on personalities from the Hindi film industry. In June 2007, The Telegraph reported on an extended interview she conducted with actor Amitabh Bachchan for the programme. The interview covered aspects of Bachchan's personal life and film career.

In 2009, Advani hosted Retake, a celebrity interview programme broadcast on a Hindi television channel. The programme featured personalities from the Hindi film industry, and its first episode featured filmmaker Rajkumar Hirani.

=== Documentary filmmaking and writing ===
In 2005, Advani produced Ananya Bharati – A Cinematic Tribute to the Motherland, a documentary exploring themes of patriotism in Hindi cinema. The film brought together songs and sequences from Indian films spanning different periods and examined the representation of national identity and patriotic themes in popular cinema.

Following the documentary, she began writing a regular column on patriotism in Indian cinema for the English-language publication Organiser in March 2005. Her articles discussed themes relating to Indian cinema, patriotism and national concerns.

== Personal life ==
Advani is the daughter of Indian politician L. K. Advani and Kamla Advani. She was previously married to Ahmedabad-based hotel executive Kailash Thadani.
