= Kavin Bharti Mittal =

Indian internet entrepreneur (born 1987)

Kavin Mittal
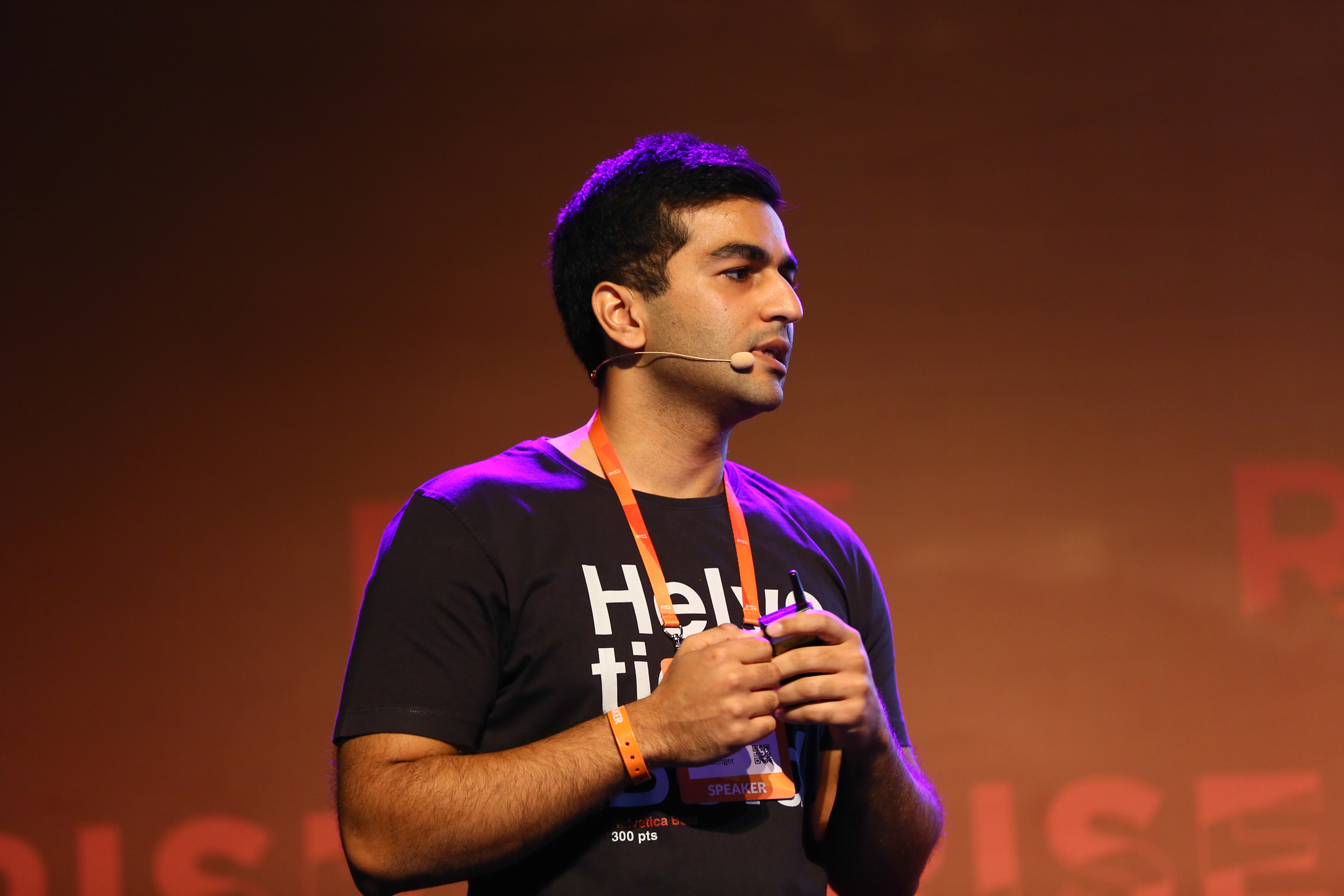
- Mittal in 2016
- Born: 30 August 1987 (age 39); Delhi, India
- Education: University of York; Imperial College London
- Occupations: Founder and CEO of Hike Messenger
- Known for: Hike
- Parents: Sunil Mittal (father); Nyna Mittal (mother)

Kavin Bharti Mittal (born 30 August 1987) is an Indian internet entrepreneur known for founding Hike, a technology company that developed Hike Messenger and the Rush Gaming Universe, and operated from 2012 until its closure in 2025.

== Early life ==
Mittal was born on 30 August 1987 in Delhi, India to parents Sunil Mittal, an industrialist, and Nyna Mittal. He earned a bachelor's degree in electronics and electrical engineering from the University of York, followed by a master's in electrical and electronics engineering and management from Imperial College London. During his studies at Imperial College London, he completed internships at McLaren Racing, Google and Goldman Sachs. At McLaren Racing, he contributed to a technology project involving the integration of track flag indicators into Formula1 steering wheel displays.

== Career ==
After returning to India, Mittal founded Hike in 2012, a technology company that developed digital communication and entertainment products. Under his leadership, the company launched Hike Messenger, an instant messaging application for the Indian market. Between 2012 and 2018, the service evolved into a broader messaging-centered application.

In August 2016, following a funding round led by Tencent, Hike was valued at over US$1 billion, making it one of India's unicorn startups. By 2018, the company reported more than 30 million monthly active users and had raised over US$250 million from investors including Tiger Global, Tencent, SoftBank and Foxconn. At its peak, Hike was estimated to have reached a valuation of more than US$1.4 billion.

In 2019, Hike officially shut down its messaging service, with Mittal citing changes in user behavior and increased competition from global platforms.

Mittal subsequently repositioned the company toward the gaming sector and launched Rush Gaming Universe, a mobile gaming platform. In August 2021, the company announced an undisclosed funding round led by Tinder co-founder Justin Mateen, with participation from SoftBank Vision Fund CEO Rajeev Misra, Tinder co-founder Sean Rad, Flipkart co-founder Binny Bansal, CRED founder Kunal Shah, and others.

Rush later expanded into social and real-money gaming services, attracting a large user base and reporting platform revenue of approximately US$500 million.

In February 2022, Mittal announced additional investment and partnerships related to its gaming initiatives from Polygon and also confirmed rumored plans to enter blockchain gaming. In May 2022, Mittal announced another undisclosed round of funding from Jump Capital, Tribe Capital, and Republic Crypto. In 2024, WinZo - a one-time partner of Hike- alleged that Hike had violated its intellectual property and copied its app. WinZO has approached the Delhi High Court, which referred the matter to arbitration.

=== Regulatory challenges ===
In 2025, regulatory changes by the Indian government affecting real-money gaming (RMG) platforms significantly impacted business models based on cash-based gameplay. These developments made Hike's RMG operations in India commercially unviable. In September 2025, Hike ceased operations after approximately 13 years in business, including the closure of its US business. Mittal subsequently announced the complete shutdown of the company.

== Public profile ==
Mittal appeared in a Forbes 30 Under 30 list in 2017. Mittal was also a part of 35 under 35 Entrepreneur magazine 2016 list.
