= International Wine and Food Society =

International gastronomical organisation

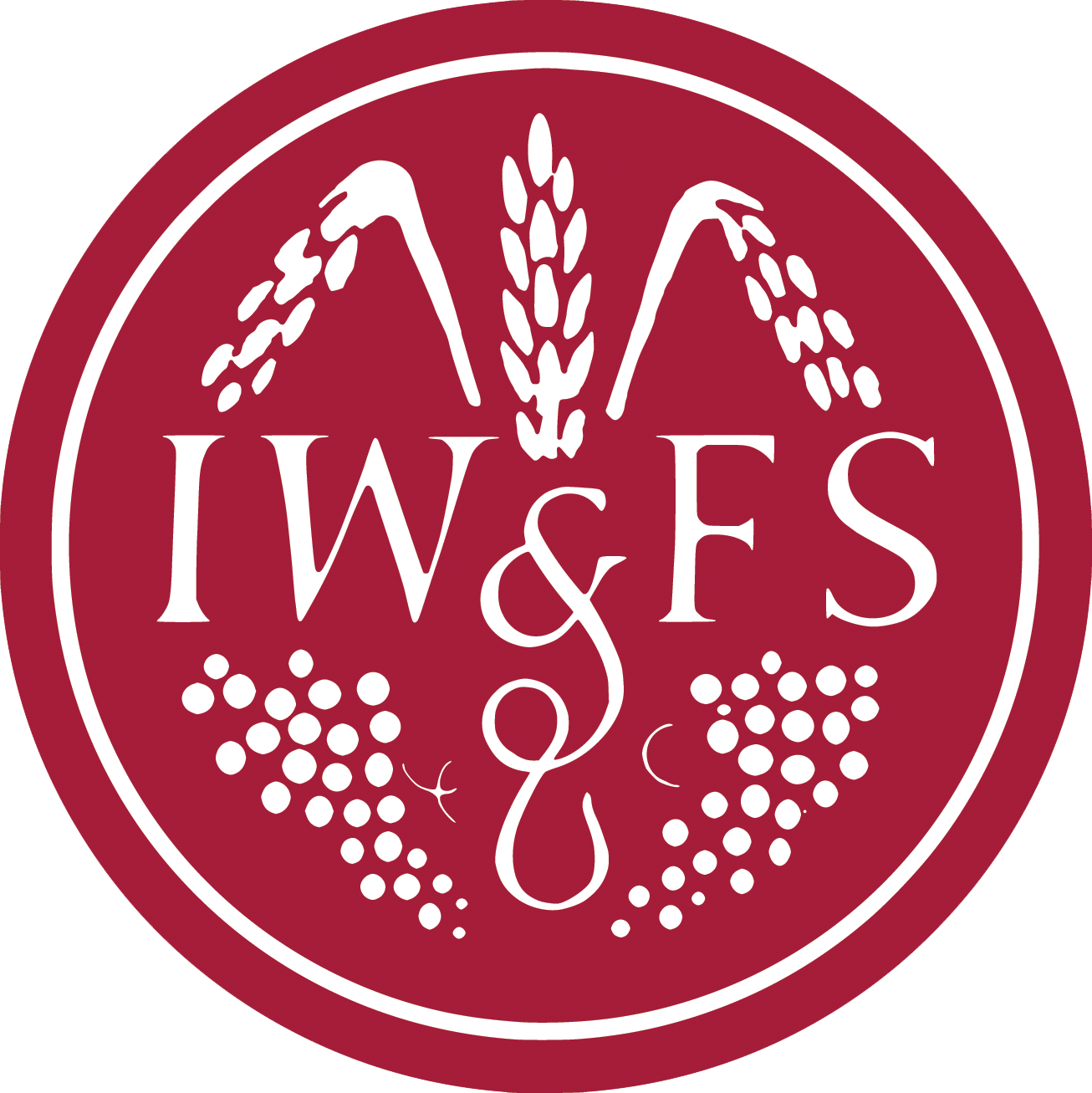
International Wine & Food Society Logo

The International Wine & Food Society Ltd. (formerly the Wine and Food Society) is a not-for-profit gastronomical organisation founded in 1933 by André Simon and A.J.A. Symons. According to its website, the society's mission is "the promotion of a broad knowledge and understanding of both wine and food, the enhancement of their appreciation, and the nurturing of camaraderie among those who share the pleasures of the table." With branches in Europe, North America, Africa, Australia and Asia, its members host a series of events throughout the year that have included dinners, wine tastings and food appreciation courses. As of 2025, there are over 132 branches and more than 5,500 members worldwide.

== History ==
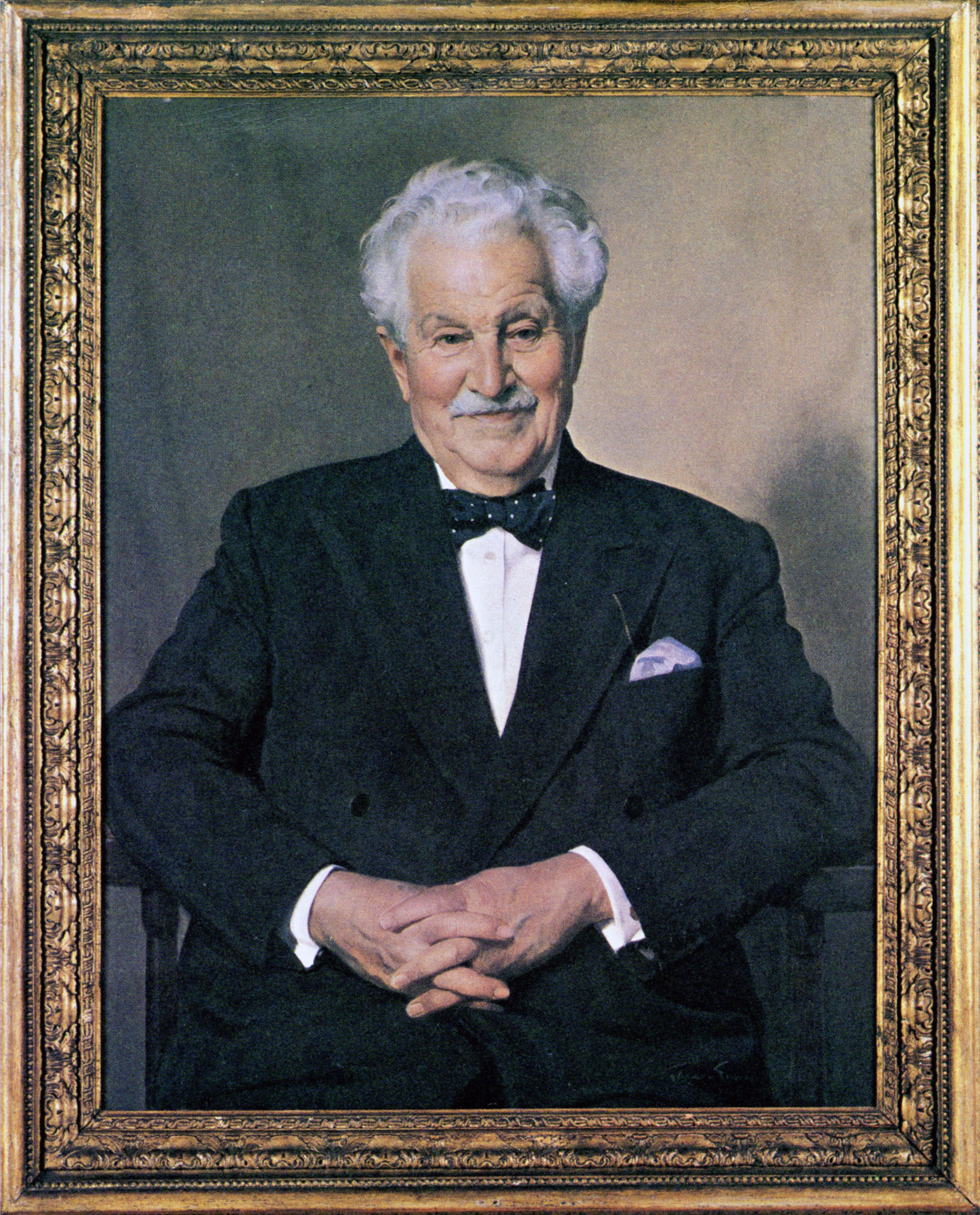
Painting of André Simon

Being an influential figure in the English wine trade, Simon had published a number of books on viticulture including In Vino Veritas (1913) and Wine and the Wine Trade (1921) where he wrote: "Wine-making is an art which the genius of discovered at the dawn of the world's history, and which has largely contributed to the well-being of mankind and to the growth of all arts ever since."

With the assistance of his friend A.J.A. Symons, Simon decided to create a society where individuals could come together to appreciate food and wine as an essential part of personal contentment and good health. Meeting for the first time in 1933, the objectives of the Wine & Food Society were:

- To promote a greater interest in, and knowledge of, food, wine and the arts of the table.
- To organise, periodically, luncheons, tastings and dinners at which experimental and inexpensive dishes will be tried, accompanied by suitable wines.
- To supply advice and assistance to members in all matters relating to food and wine.
- To publish books and pamphlets relating to food and wine, and their history.
- To collect from members, and publish, information as to hotels and restaurants where good food and wine may be enjoyed.
- To oppose legislative restrictions prejudicial to the enjoyment of food and wine.
- To maintain a library, which shall be accessible to members, relating to the art of good living.
- To organise tours by members of the Society to the vineyards in vintage time under favourable conditions.

Also during this time, Simon established and edited a quarterly journal titled Wine and Food, which helped to transform the study of gastronomy before, during and after the Second World War. Sent to members of the society, the influential publication printed articles about the history of wine and food, book reviews and critical assessments of hotels and restaurants.

In 1934 and 1935, Simon travelled to the United States, where prohibition had just ended. During those years, he helped to establish North America's first branches that included New York City, Boston, Chicago and San Francisco. Subsequent trips to Australia and South Africa brought about in an increased membership across the globe, resulting in the organization changing its name to the International Wine & Food Society in 1968.

Former members of the IWFS have included Maynard Amerine, Jack Drummond, Julian Street and Frank Schoonmaker.

== Current Structure ==
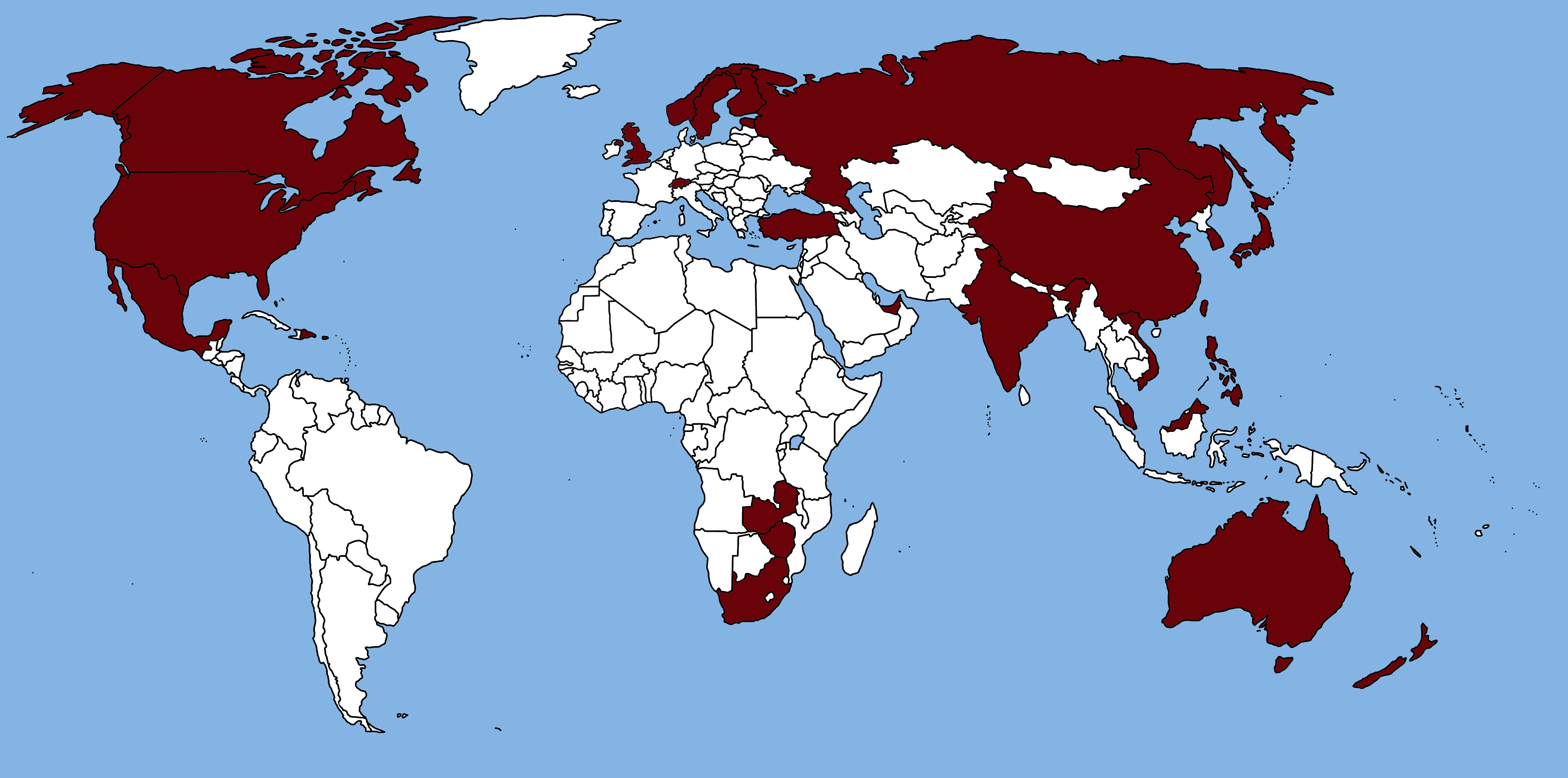
Countries in red have an International Wine and Food Society branch

Presently, the IWFS is divided into three geographic regions: the Americas (AMS), Europe Africa (EA) and Asia Pacific (AP). The leadership throughout the Society is voluntary and without compensation.

In the Europe Africa region (EA), IWFS Europe Africa Ltd, co-ordinates the branches, membership and events in Europe, Scandinavia, The Baltic States, Russia, Africa and Dubai. In that region, there are currently 24 branches and approximately 1000 members. In order to establish a new branch, at least ten people are needed in order to be awarded a two-year provisional charter.

In the Americas (AMS), IWFS Americas Inc. oversees activity in Canada, the United States, Mexico, the Caribbean and South America. Individual branches in this region – while mostly autonomous in terms of membership and organisation – must meet certain criteria every year in order to maintain their charters. For a any city, town or geographic region to be considered for a new branch, they must meet a number of rules and requirements set forth by IWFS Americas Inc. If they meet these criteria, a two-year probationary status begins, after which they will receive their permanent charter.

In the Asia Pacific region (AP), the Committee and its Executive Officers govern branches in the region under the company IWFS Asia Pacific Ltd. There are currently 31 branches across the region including Australasia, China, Philippines, Thailand and India.

In addition, The International Council of Management oversees issues of an international perspective with regards to the IWFS. The council is made up of seven members: three from the Americas, two from Europe Africa and two from Asia Pacific who meet three times annually.

== Festivals ==
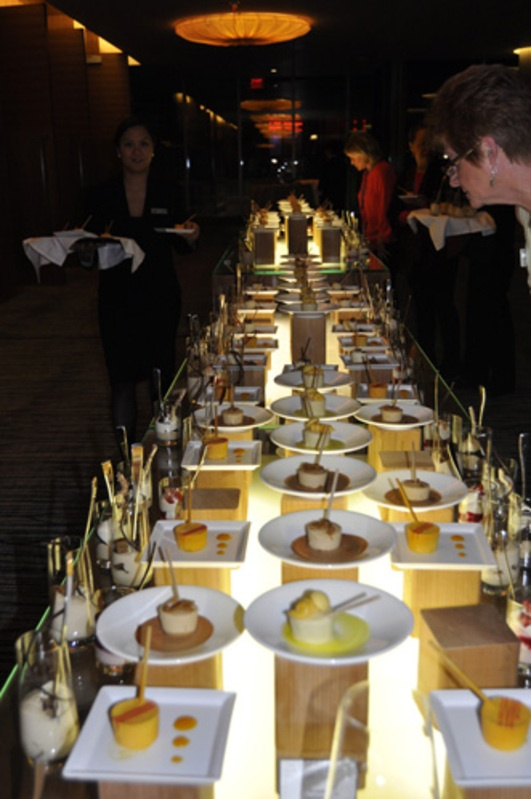
An event from the 2012 International Festival held in Vancouver, British Columbia

Each region organises events and festivals that are held throughout the year and are usually open to all IWFS members.

Additionally, all of the regions come together to host an International Festival that is held once every three years. Activities at these festivals have included wine tastings, formal dinners, information sessions and guided tours of the host city. The following places are hosting or have hosted an International Festival:

- Rioja, Spain (EA 2025)
- Napa Valley, California (AMS 2025)
- Hong Kong (AP 2024)
- Willamette Valley (AMS 2023)
- Catalunya, Spain (EA 2023)
- Singapore (AP 2022)
- Bordeaux (AMS 2022)
- Madeira (EA 2021)
- Douro, Portugal (AMS 2019)
- London, England (2018)
- Melbourne, Australia (2015)
- Vancouver, Canada (2012)
- Cape Town, South Africa (2009)
- Tuscany, Italy (2003)
- Napa Valley, US (2000)
- San Juan, Puerto Rico (1998)
- Helsinki, Finland (1997)
- Auckland, New Zealand (1996)
- London, England (1993)
- New York City, US (1992)
- Singapore (1989)
- Strasbourg, France (1986)
- Vancouver, Canada (1983)
- Sydney & Melbourne, Australia (1980)
- London, England (1977)
- Los Angeles and San Francisco, US (1974)
- Paris, France (1971)
- Torquay, England (1969)
- Chicago, US (1966)
- Bath, England (1935)
- Brighton, England (1934)

== Publications ==
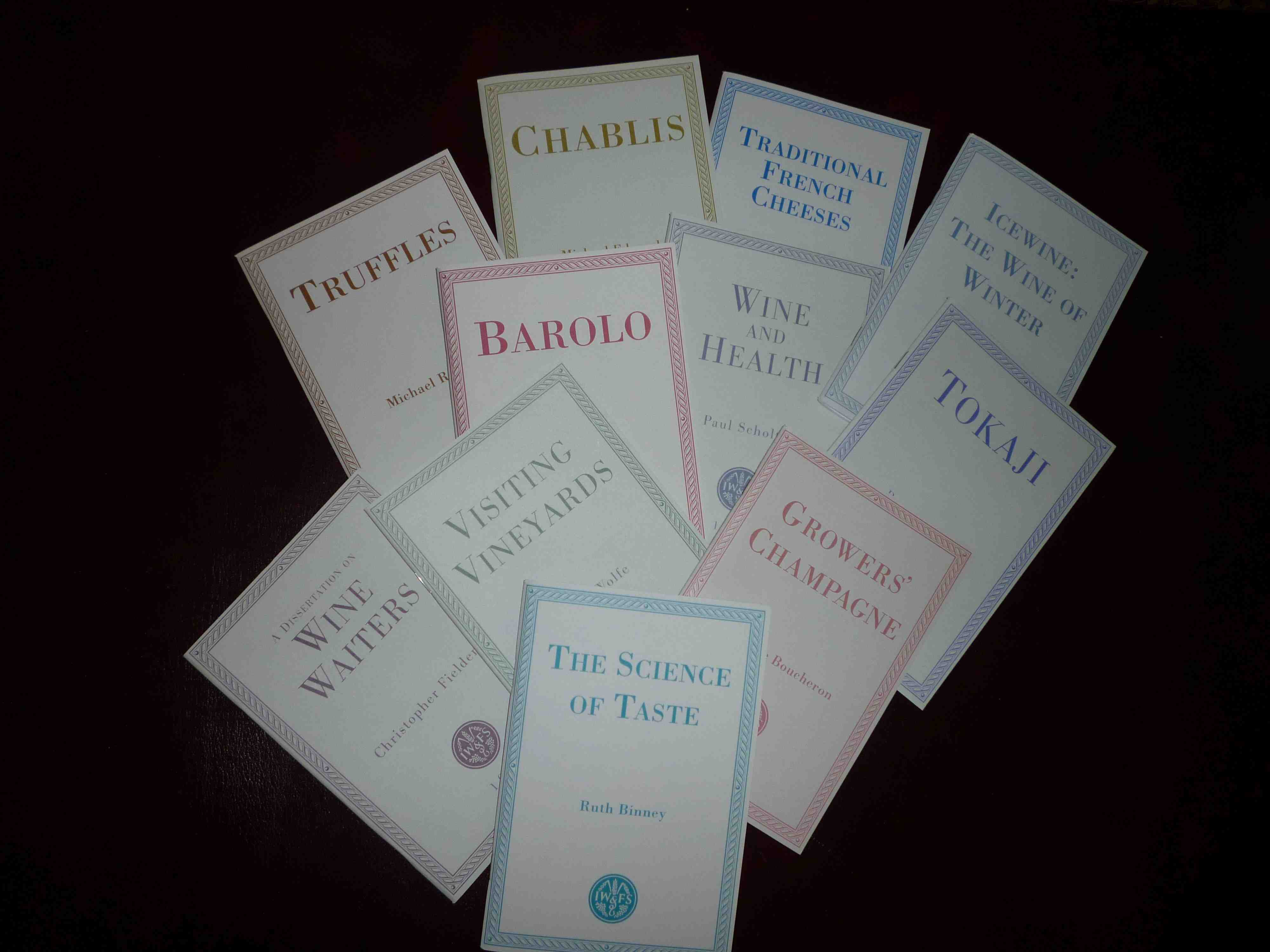
A collection of monographs published by the International Wine & Food Society

Since 1996, the International Wine & Food Society has published a total of 25 monographs dealing with numerous food and wine subjects. The list of titles include Sparkling Wines of the World by Essi Avellan MW, The World of Tea by Will Battle, Pinot Noir Around the World by Anne Krebiehl MW, The Essential Guide to Modern Madeira by Richard Mayson, Exploring Blended Scotch by Charles MacLean MBE and Stuart Leaf, Spices of the World by Jill Norman, The Essential Guide to English Wine by Susie Barrie MW and Peter Richards MW, Sonoma County by Tina Caputo, Around the World with Olive Oil by Judy Ridgway, Taming of the Screwcap by Dr Jamie Goode, Reflections through a wine glass, some contemporary issues explored by Bob Campbell MW, An Appreciation of the Age of Wine by Sid Cross, Biodynamics in Wine by Beverly Blanning MW and The Science of Taste by Ruth Binney.

Quarterly magazines are published and printed by two of the regions for their respective members – the Americas Wine Food & Friends and in Europe Africa Food and Wine. The AP issues an e-newsletter for AP Members in January and July. The International Secretariat also issues a quarterly e-newsletter, "The Global Grapevine", which is distributed globally to all members. The IWFS also produces a Vintage Card each year which takes the form of the Society's annual membership card. The card is thoroughly reviewed each year by respected wine specialists around the world.

The Guildhall Library in the City of London houses an extensive record of Society events and their menus and is open to the public for reference.
