= Satya Bahin =

Indian politician

Member of Parliament, Rajya Sabha
- In office 1988–1994
- Constituency: Uttar Pradesh

Personal details
- Born: 15 January 1944 (age 82)
- Party: Indian National Congress

Satya Bahin is an Indian politician . She was a Member of Parliament, representing Uttar Pradesh in the Rajya Sabha the upper house of India's Parliament as a member of the Indian National Congress
