= Shamim Hashmi =

Indian politician

Syed Shamim Hashmi
- Born: 16 January 1940; Makhdumpur, Jehanabad, Bihar
- Died: 8 June 2006 (aged 64)
- Occupations: Politician, Social activist

Shamim Hashmi, MP (also Shri Syed Shamim Hashmi) born January 16, 1940 - June 8, 2006, was a politician and social activist. He served as a Rajya Sabha Congress MP from the state of Bihar. Prior to that he was also the Chairman of B.L.D and General Secretary of Janata Party and Lok Dal; also he was a Member of Bihar Legislative Assembly during 1980–85. Apart from his efforts towards social uplifment in his constituency, he is remembered as a close confidant of Shri Karpoori Thakur and former Indian Prime Minister Shri Rajiv Gandhi.

== Early life ==
Hashmi was born in to the illustrious family of S.M. Quuamruddin in Makhdumpur, near Jehanabad, Bihar, British India. Like several families of Northern India, the Hashmis also lost everything in the pre-partition riots, that forced them to move to the northern region of Motihari in East Champaran, Bihar. An avid learner, the obstacles and dearth of financial resources did not become a barrier for him to pursue higher education in Law. Despite his passion for public service, Hashmi had to continue his practice in Law while also teaching part-time in order to support the family. Subsequently, driven by the desire to make his contribution to the society, he joined politics with principles in Socialism. He is survived by his five children and his grandchildren, most of whom divide their time between New Delhi and at his institute for underprivileged children in northern Bihar.
