= Madan Bhatia =

Indian lawyer and parliamentarian 1929 – 2013

Madan Bhatia (August 1929 – 27 June 2013) was an Indian lawyer and parliamentarian. He served two terms as a nominated member of the Rajya Sabha from 1982 to 1988 and 1988 till 1994. He was born in Jhelum.

He argued in Maneka Gandhi v. Union of India

== Sources ==
- Brief Biodata
