= Bharti Infratel =

Indian telecommunications infrastructure company

Bharti Infratel Limited
- Company type: Public
- Traded as: NSE: INFRATEL; BSE: 534816
- ISIN: INE121J01017
- Industry: Telecommunications
- Founded: July 2007
- Defunct: 19 November 2020
- Fate: Merged with Indus Towers
- Successor: Indus Towers
- Headquarters: 901, Park Centra, Sector 30, NH 8, Gurugram, Haryana, India
- Number of locations: 95,372 towers (March 2020)
- Area served: India
- Key people: D. S. Rawat (MD & CEO); Akhil Gupta (Chairman); Pooja Jain (CFO)
- Revenue: ▼₹6,871.7 crore (US$720 million) (FY20)
- Operating income: ▲₹3,787.5 crore (US$400 million) (FY20)
- Net income: ▲₹3,298.7 crore (US$340 million) (FY20)
- Total assets: ▲₹20,158.8 crore (US$2.1 billion) (FY20)
- Total equity: ▼₹13,542.3 crore (US$1.4 billion) (FY20)
- Number of employees: 2,402 (FY20)
- Parent: Bharti Airtel

Bharti Infratel Limited was an Indian telecommunications infrastructure company that provided telecom infrastructure such as telecom towers, fiber networks and other related infrastructure. Headquartered in Gurugram, Haryana, the company was established by Bharti Airtel in July 2007 by spinning-off its mobile towers to a new wholly owned subsidiary. Bharti Infratel was the first Indian company to start a tower infrastructure sharing business. It was India's largest consolidated tower infrastructure company, directly owning 95,372 towers as on 31 March 2020.

Bharti Infratel was merged with Indus Towers on 19 November 2020. Bharti Airtel now holds a 36.73% stake in Indus Towers.

== History ==
On 23 January 2007, Bharti Airtel announced that it would spin-off its mobile towers to a new wholly owned subsidiary called Bharti Infratel Limited. Bharti Infratel Limited was incorporated in July 2007.

Bharti Infratel initiated an initial public offering (IPO) in December 2012 raising US$764 million. The IPO was subscribed 1.3 times and was the largest IPO in India since Coal India in October 2010. Bharti Infratel was listed on the Bombay Stock Exchange and the National Stock Exchange on 28 December 2012.

The company used to be in the NIFTY 50 index. In September 2020, Divi's Laboratories and SBI Life Insurance Company replaced Bharti Infratel and Zee Entertainment Enterprises on the index.

=== Merger with Indus Towers ===
Indus Towers was incorporated in November 2007 as an Indian telecommunications infrastructure company offering passive infrastructure services to telecom operators and other wireless services providers such as broadband service providers. Bharti Infratel held a 42% stake in the company, with Vodafone Group holding 42% and Vodafone Idea holding 11.15%. The remaining 4.85% stake was held by private equity firm Providence Equity.

Bharti Airtel, Vodafone Group, and Vodafone Idea announced on 25 April 2018 that they had signed an agreement to merge Bharti Infratel with Indus Towers. The merger was originally planned to go through before October 2019. However, due to delays in approvals, it was postponed to December 2019 by when the Department of Telecommunications (DoT) was supposed to give its permission. Owing to further delays by the DoT and the National Company Law Tribunal, the deadline was extended multiple times to 24 June 2020.

The DoT approved the merger on 21 February 2020. The merger received foreign direct investment approval and was due to be completed by 31 August. The merger was approved by Bharti Infratel's board on 1 September, and by Vodafone Group in October 2020.

The merger was completed on 19 November 2020. Vodafone Idea received ₹3,760.1 crore (US$390 million) as compensation for its 11.15% stake. Post-merger, Bharti Airtel received a 36.73% stake in the merged entity and Vodafone Group held a 28.12% stake. The remaining shares are held by private equity firm Providence Equity Partners (3.1%) and public shares (35.2%). The merger made Indus Towers the second largest telecom tower infrastructure operator in the world.
