= Indus Towers =

Indian telecommunications tower company

Indus Towers Limited
- Company type: Public
- Traded as: BSE: 534816; NSE: INDUSTOWER
- ISIN: INE121J01017
- Industry: Telecommunications
- Predecessor: Bharti Infratel
- Founded: November 2007; 18 years ago
- Headquarters: DLF Cyber City, Gurugram, Haryana, India
- Number of locations: 219,736 towers (FY24)
- Area served: India
- Key people: N. Kumar (chairman); Prachur Shah (MD & CEO)
- Revenue: ▲₹30,123 crore (US$3.1 billion) (2025)
- Operating income: ▲₹13,154 crore (US$1.4 billion) (2025)
- Net income: ▲₹9,932 crore (US$1.0 billion) (2025)
- Total assets: ▲₹63,168 crore (US$6.6 billion) (2025)
- Total equity: ▲₹32,498 crore (US$3.4 billion) (2025)
- Owners: Bharti Airtel (51.03%)
- Number of employees: 3,554 (FY24)
- Website: www.industowers.com

Indus Towers Limited is an Indian telecommunications infrastructure company offering passive infrastructure services to mobile network operators and other wireless services providers. Headquartered in Gurugram, Haryana, Indus Towers was incorporated in November 2007 by Bharti Infratel (a subsidiary of Bharti Airtel), Vodafone Essar, and Idea Cellular, to provide shared telecom infrastructure to telecom operators on a non-discriminatory basis.

Bharti Infratel merged with Indus Towers on 19 November 2020, creating one of the largest mobile tower infrastructure operators in the world. Post-merger, Bharti Airtel held a 36.73% stake in Indus Towers, with Vodafone Group Plc holding 28.12%, and 3.1% shares held by Providence Equity.

Currently Indus Towers is a subsidiary of Bharati Airtel after the latter increased its stake to 50.005% & Vodafone Group Plc exited the company

Indus Towers Limited has over 192,874 towers and 342,831 co-locations and a nationwide presence covering all 22 telecom circles. It has the widest coverage in India and has already achieved 289,000 tenancies, a first in the telecom tower industry globally. Some of its major customers include Airtel, Bharti Hexacom, Jio and Vi.

== History ==
Indus Towers Limited was founded in November 2007 by Bharti Infratel, Vodafone Essar, and Idea Cellular, with the goal of merging their passive infrastructure assets across 16 telecom circles. It was incorporated with an objective to provide shared telecom infrastructure to telecom operators on a non-discriminatory basis. Bharti Infratel held a 42% stake in the company, with Vodafone Group Plc holding 42% and Vodafone Idea holding 11.15%. The remaining 4.85% stake was held by private equity firm Providence Equity.

=== Bharti Infratel merger ===
In 2017, reports suggested that Bharti Infratel was looking to acquire the 53% stake in Indus Towers, owned by Vodacom Group and Vodafone Idea. However, in July, the head of Vodafone stated that they were "actively considering" a float of their stake in Indus Towers. Vodafone went on to deliver a formal mandate to both Bank of America Merrill Lynch and Morgan Stanley to finalize buyers.

Bharti Airtel (Bharti Infratel's parent company), Vodafone Group, and Vodafone Idea announced on 25 April 2018 that they had signed an agreement to merge Bharti Infratel with Indus Towers. Under the terms of the agreement, Bharti Infratel will transfer 1,565 of its own shares for each Indus Towers share valuing the latter at $10 billion. Other major shareholders in Indus Towers such as Idea Cellular and Providence Equity Partners would be provided an option to cash out. Prior to the merger, shareholding in Indus Towers was Bharti Infratel (42%), Vodafone Group (42%), Idea Cellular (11.15%) and Providence Equity Partners (4.85%).

The merger was originally planned to go through before October 2019. However, due to delays in approvals, it was postponed to December 2019 by when the Department of Telecommunications (DoT) was supposed to give its permission. Owing to further delays by the DoT and the National Company Law Tribunal the deadline was extended multiple times to 24 June 2020.

The DoT approved the merger on 21 February 2020. The merger received foreign direct investment approval and was due to be completed by 31 August. The merger was approved by Bharti Infratel's board on 1 September, and by Vodafone Group in October 2020. The merger was completed on 19 November 2020. Vodafone Idea received ₹3,760.1 crore (US$390 million) as cash compensation for its 11.15% stake. Post-merger, Bharti Airtel received a 36.73% stake in the merged entity and Vodafone Group held a 28.12% stake. The remaining shares are held by private equity firm Providence Equity Partners (3.1%) and public shares (35.2%). The merger made Indus Towers the second largest telecom tower infrastructure operator in the world.

=== Vodafone Group sells entire stake in Indus ===
On June 19, 2024, UK's Vodafone Group Plc said that it has sold an 18% stake. Out its 21.05% holding — in Indus Towers for Rs 15,300 crore. The stake sale proceeds will be used to clear bulk of the UK company's existing lender dues relating to $1.8 billion of borrowings secured against its Indian assets.

On 5 December, Vodafone Group Plc sold the remaining 3.05% stake, permanently exiting the company. The stake sale will be used to pay $101 million owed to Indian banks and the remaining money will be used to subscribe to preferred shares of Vodafone Idea which will be used to reduce outstanding debt with Indus Towers.
