= 1952 Rajya Sabha elections =

Elections for the Upper House of Indian Parliament

1952 Rajya Sabha election

230 seats in the Rajya Sabha 116 elected seats needed for a majority
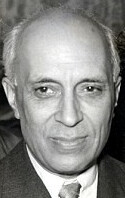

	First party	Second party
Leader	Jawaharlal Nehru	Ajoy Ghosh
Party	INC	CPI
Seats won	172	8
Percentage	74.78%	3.48%

Rajya Sabha elections were held in 1952, to elect members of the Council of States (the Rajya Sabha), Indian Parliament's upper chamber.

== Elections ==
Results of the election

Elections were held in 1952 to elect members from various states of Independent India. Dr. S Radhakrishnan was the First Chairman of the Rajya Sabha, also the First Vice President of the Nation. The list is incomplete.

=== Members elected ===
The members are elected in the elections held in 1952. As per the Fourth Schedule to the Constitution of India, the Rajya Sabha was first constituted 3 April 1952. and consist of 216 members of which 12 members were to be nominated by the President and the remaining 204 elected to represent the States.As per President Order known as the Council of States (Term of Office of Members) Order, 1952 for curtailing the term of office of some of the members, then chosen in order that as nearly as one-third of the members holding seats of each class would retire in every second year. The term of office of a member expires on 2 April 1958; 2 April 1956 and 2 April 1954 and accordingly members would be placed in the first, second or third category.

=== Members with term 1952-54 ===
The following members are retired before the elections held in 1954. They are members for the term 1952 ||54. Some members did not complete the term in case of the resignation or death before the term ending in 1954. In such cases the bye-elections were held.

State - Member - Party

Rajya Sabha members for term 1952–1954
State	Member Name	Party	Remark
Ajmer & Coorg	Abdul Shakoor Maulana	Indian National Congress	
Assam	Dr S. K. Bhuyan	Indian National Congress	
Assam	Lakshesvar Borooah	Indian National Congress	
Bihar	Angelina Tiga	Jharkhand Party	
Bihar	Ramdhari Singh Dinkar	Indian National Congress	
Bihar	Inaitullah Khawaja	Indian National Congress	
Bihar	Kailash Bihari Lall	Indian National Congress	
Bihar	Lakshmi N. Menon	Indian National Congress	
Bihar	Dr. Purna Chandra Mitra	Indian National Congress	
Bihar	Rajendra Pratap Sinha	Indian National Congress	
Bombay	Abid Ali Jaferbhai	Indian National Congress	
Bombay	Violet Alva	Indian National Congress	
Bombay	Narsinghrao Deshmukh	Peasants and Workers Party of India	
Bombay	R. R. Diwakar	Indian National Congress	Resigned 13/06/1952
Bombay	Shreyans Prasad Jain	Indian National Congress	
Bombay	B. G. Kher	Indian National Congress	Resigned 14/07/1952
Bombay	Chandulal Parikh	Indian National Congress	
Bombay	Devkinandan Narayan	Indian National Congress	
Hyderabad	B. S. Venkatrao	Indian National Congress	Death 04/11/1953
Hyderabad	Konda Narayanappa	Indian National Congress	
Hyderabad	Osman Sobhani	Indian National Congress	
Hyderabad	J. H. Subbiah	Scheduled Castes Federation	
Jammu and Kashmir	Anant Nath Pandit	Jammu & Kashmir National Conference	
Kutch	Lakhamshi Lavji	Indian National Congress	Elected 24/09/1952
Kutch	Premji Thaker	Indian National Congress	Resigned 24/09/1952
Madhya Bharat	Sardar C. S. Angre	Hindu Mahasabha	
Madhya Bharat	Dr Raghubir Sinh	Indian National Congress	
Madhya Pradesh	Dr R. P. Dube	Indian National Congress	
Madhya Pradesh	Samiulla Khan	Indian National Congress	
Madhya Pradesh	Chandragopal Misra	Kisan Mazdoor Praja Party	
Madhya Pradesh	Thakur Bhannu Pratap Singh	Indian National Congress	
Madras	N. Gopalswami Ayyangar	Indian National Congress	Death 10/02/1953
Madras	Makineni Basavapunnaiah	Communist Party of India	
Madras	S. Guruswami	Independent	
Madras	K. S. Hegde	Indian National Congress	
Madras	E. K. Imbichi Bava	Communist Party of India	
Madras	B. V. Kakkilaya	Communist Party of India	
Madras	T. V. Kamalaswamy	Indian National Congress	
Madras	P. S. Rajgopal Naidu	Indian National Congress	
Madras	K. M. Rahmath Ullah	Indian National Congress	
Madras	K. Rama Rao	Indian National Congress	
Madras	T. Bhaskara Rao	Indian National Congress	
Manipur & Tripura	Arman Ali Munshi	Ganatantrik Sangh	
Mysore	C. Gopala Krishnamoorty Reddy	Socialist Party of India	
Mysore	K Chengalaraya Reddy	Indian National Congress	
Nominated	Aladi Ayyar	Nominated	Death 03/10/1953
Nominated	Prof Satyendra Nath Bose	Nominated	
Nominated	Prithviraj Kapoor	Nominated	
Nominated	Dr. J. M. Kumarappa	Nominated	
Nominated	Dr. Kalidas Nag	Nominated	
Orissa	Prafulla Chandra Banj Deo	Ganatantra Parishad	
Orissa	Shoila Bala Das	Indian National Congress	
Orissa	Baidyanath Rath	Communist Party of India	
Punjab	Dr Anup Singh	Indian National Congress	
Punjab	Hans Raj Raizada	Indian National Congress	Resigned 29/08/1952
Punjab	Jathedar Udham Singh Nagoke	Indian National Congress	
Punjab	M H S Nihal Singh	Indian National Congress	
PEPSU	Kartar Singh	Indian National Congress	Death 02/10/1953
Rajasthan	Barkatullah Khan	Indian National Congress	
Rajasthan	Ramnath Poddar	Indian National Congress	
Rajasthan	Mahindra Singh Ranawat	Indian National Congress	
Saurashtra	Dr D. H. Variava	Indian National Congress	
Travancore & Cochin	K. C. George	Indian National Congress	Resigned 05/03/1954
Travancore & Cochin	M. Mathai	Indian National Congress	
Uttar Pradesh	Amarnath Agarwal	Indian National Congress	
Uttar Pradesh	Amolakh Chand	Indian National Congress	
Uttar Pradesh	Ram Chandra Gupta	Indian National Congress	
Uttar Pradesh	Ahmed Syed Khan	Indian National Congress	
Uttar Pradesh	M. M. Faruqi	Indian National Congress	
Uttar Pradesh	Narendra Deva	Congress Socialist Party	
Uttar Pradesh	Brij Bihari Sharma	Indian National Congress	
Uttar Pradesh	Lal Bahadur Shastri	Indian National Congress	
Uttar Pradesh	Bapu Gopinath Singh	Indian National Congress	
Uttar Pradesh	Sumat Prasad	Indian National Congress	
Vindyachal Pradesh	Baij Nath Dubey	Socialist Party of India	
Vindyachal Pradesh	Captain Awadhesh Pratap Singh	Indian National Congress	
West Bengal	Charu Chandra Biswas	Indian National Congress	
West Bengal	Rajpat Singh Doogar	Indian National Congress	
West Bengal	Nalinaskha Dutt	Indian National Congress	
West Bengal	Debaprasad Ghosh	Bharatiya Jana Sangh	
West Bengal	Suresh Chandra Majumdar	Indian National Congress	

=== Members with term 1952-56 ===
The following members are retired before the elections held in 1956. They are members for the term 1952–56. Some members did not complete the term in case of the resignation or death before the term ending in 1956. In such cases the bye-elections were held.

State - Member - Party

Rajya Sabha members for term 1952–1956
State	Member Name	Party	Remark
Assam	Pushpalata Das	Indian National Congress	
Assam	Mohammad Roufique	Independent	
Bihar	Ram Gopal Agarwala	Indian National Congress	
Bihar	Valadi Ganapathi Gopal	Indian National Congress	
Bihar	Jafar Imam	Indian National Congress	
Bihar	Kishori Ram	Indian National Congress	
Bihar	Imam Syed Mazhar	Indian National Congress	
Bihar	Maheshwar Prasad Narain Sinha	Indian National Congress	
Bihar	Tajumal Hussain	Indian National Congress	
Bilaspur and Himachal Pradesh	Chiranji Lal Verma	Indian National Congress	
Bombay	Dr B R Ambedkar	Scheduled Castes Federation	
Bombay	Dr Waman Barlingay	Indian National Congress	
Bombay	Trimbak Deogirikar	Indian National Congress	
Bombay	Venkat Dhage	Indian National Congress	
Bombay	Dr M. D. D. Gilder	Indian National Congress	
Bombay	D. Y. Pawar	Indian National Congress	
Bombay	Manilal Shah	Indian National Congress	
Hyderabad	Konda Narayanappa	Indian National Congress	
Hyderabad	V. K. Dhage	Independent	
Hyderabad	Dr Raj Bahadur Goud	Indian National Congress	
Hyderabad	Italia Dinshaw	Independent	
Jammu & Kashmir	Syed M Jalali	Jammu & Kashmir National Conference	
Kutch	Premji Bhavanji Thacker	Indian National Congress	Resigned 26/07/1952
Madhya Bharat	Kanhailal Vaidya	Indian National Congress	
Madhya Bharat	Krishna Kant Vyas	Indian National Congress	
Madhya Pradesh	Dr Waman Barlingay	Indian National Congress	
Madhya Pradesh	Pandit Sitacharan Dube	Indian National Congress	
Madhya Pradesh	Gopaldas Mohta	Indian National Congress	
Madhya Pradesh	M. R. Mujumdar	Indian National Congress	
Madhya Pradesh	Dr Raghu Vira	Indian National Congress	
Madras	Dr Pattabhi Sitaramayya	Indian National Congress	Resigned 02/07/1952
Madras	Mona Hensman	Indian National Congress	
Madras	A. Ramaswami Mudaliar	Independent	
Madras	V. M. Obaidullah Sahib	Indian National Congress	
Madras	T. S. Pattabiraman	Indian National Congress	
Madras	S. Sambhu Prasad	Indian National Congress	
Madras	S. Venkatanaraman	Indian National Congress	
Mysore	L. H. Thimmabovi	Indian National Congress	Resigned 24/08/1952
Mysore	S. V. Krishnamoorthy Rao	Indian National Congress	
Mysore	M. Govinda Reddy	Indian National Congress	
Nominated	Rukmini Devi Arundale	Nominated	
Nominated	N. R. Malkani	Nominated	
Nominated	Dr Sahib Singh Sokhey	Nominated	
Nominated	Dr Zakir Hussain	Nominated	
Orissa	Jagannath Das	Indian National Congress	
Orissa	Surendranath Dwivedy	Indian National Congress	
Orissa	Sunder Mohan Hemrom	Indian National Congress	
PEPSU	Lt. Col Joginder Singh Mann	Akali Dal	
Punjab	Chaman Lall Diwan	Indian National Congress	
Punjab	Darshan Singh Pheruman	Indian National Congress	
Rajasthan	Sharda Bhargava	Indian National Congress	
Rajasthan	Harish Chandra Mathur	Independent	
Rajasthan	Dr Kalu Lal Shrimali	Indian National Congress	
Saurashtra	Nanabhai Bhatt	Indian National Congress	
Saurashtra	Bhogilal Shah	Indian National Congress	
Travancore & Cochin	K. P. Madhavan Nair	Indian National Congress	
Travancore & Cochin	A. Abdul Razak	Indian National Congress	
Uttar Pradesh	Dr J. P. Srivastava	Indian National Congress	Death 14/12/1954
Uttar Pradesh	Aizaz Rasul Begum	Indian National Congress	
Uttar Pradesh	Akhtar Hussain	Indian National Congress	
Uttar Pradesh	Jashaud Singh Bhist	Indian National Congress	
Uttar Pradesh	Jaspat Roy Kapoor	Indian National Congress	
Uttar Pradesh	Dr Hriday N Kunzru	Independent	
Uttar Pradesh	Chandravati Lakhanpal	Indian National Congress	
Uttar Pradesh	Dr Murari Lal	Indian National Congress	
Uttar Pradesh	Savitri Devi Nigam	Indian National Congress	
Uttar Pradesh	Har Prasad Saksena	Indian National Congress	
Uttar Pradesh	Ram Kripal Singh	Indian National Congress	
Uttar Pradesh	Ram Prasad Tamta	Indian National Congress	
Vindyachal Pradesh	Ahmed Gulsher	Indian National Congress	
West Bengal	Satyapriya Banerjee	All India Forward Bloc	
West Bengal	Indra Bhushan Beed	Indian National Congress	
West Bengal	Nausher Ali Syed	Indian National Congress	
West Bengal	Satyendra Prosad Ray	Indian National Congress	

=== Members with term 1952-58 ===
The following members are retired before the elections held in 1958. They are members for the term 1952–58. Some members did not complete the term in case of the resignation or death before the term ending in 1958. In such cases the bye-elections were held.

State - Member - Party

Rajya Sabha members for term 1952–1958
State	Member Name	Party	Remark
Assam	Raymond Thanhlira	Indian National Congress	
Assam	Maulana M Tayyebulla	Indian National Congress	
Bombay	Rajaram Balkrishna Raut	Peasants and Workers Party	Resigned 15/03/1957
Bombay	Somnath Dave	Indian National Congress	
Bombay	Ramrao Deshmukh	Indian National Congress	
Bombay	Lalchand Hirachand Doshi	Indian National Congress	
Bombay	Bhalchandra Gupte	Indian National Congress	
Bombay	Lilavati Munshi	Indian National Congress	
Bhopal	Bhairon Prasad	Indian National Congress	
Bihar	Sri Narayan Mahtha	Indian National Congress	Death 06/10/1956
Bihar	Ahmed Hussain Kazi	Indian National Congress	
Bihar	Kameshwara Singh	Independent	
Bihar	Braj Kishore Prasad Sinha	Indian National Congress	
Bihar	Rajeshwar Prasad Narain Sinha	Indian National Congress	
Bihar	Rama Bahadur Sinha	Indian National Congress	
Bihar	Kuwarani Vijaya Raje	Bharatiya Jana Sangh	Resigned 20/03/1957
Delhi	Onkar Nath	Indian National Congress	Resigned 16/04/1955
Hyderabad	Puranmal Surajmal Lahoti	Indian National Congress	Death 11/02/1954
Hyderabad	S. Channa Reddy	Indian National Congress	
Hyderabad	Kishen Chand	Praja Socialist Party	
Hyderabad	Narsinghrao Deshmukh	Peasants and Workers Party of India	
Jammu & Kashmir	Sardar Budh Singh	Jammu & Kashmir National Conference	
Jammu & Kashmir	Pir Mohhmed Khan	Jammu & Kashmir National Conference	
Jammu & Kashmir	Maulana M Tayyebulla	Jammu & Kashmir National Conference	
Madhya Bharat	Tribak Pustake	Indian National Congress	
Madhya Bharat	Vinayak Sarwate	Indian National Congress	
Madhya Pradesh	Ramesh Agnibhoj	Indian National Congress	
Madhya Pradesh	Ramrao Deshmukh	Indian National Congress	
Madhya Pradesh	Dr Seeta Parmanand	Indian National Congress	
Madhya Pradesh	Gangaram Thaware	Indian National Congress	Death 16/08/1952
Madhya Pradesh	Martandrao Ramchandrarao	Indian National Congress	
Madras	N. G. Ranga	Indian National Congress	Resigned 16/03/1957
Madras	M Muhammad Ismail Saheb	Muslim League	
Madras	K. L. Narsimham	Communist Party of India	
Madras	G. Rajagopalan	Indian National Congress	
Madras	H. D. Rajah	Republican Party of India	
Madras	V. M. Surendra Ram	Indian National Congress	
Madras	K. Suryanarayana	Indian National Congress	
Madras	Pydah Venkatanarayana	Praja Socialist Party	
Madras	P Sundarayya	Communist Party of India	Resigned 21/03/1955
Mysore	P. B. Basappa Shetty	Indian National Congress	
Mysore	M. Valiulla	Indian National Congress	
Nominated	R. R. Diwakar	Nominated	
Nominated	Maithili Sharan Gupt	Nominated	
Nominated	Kaka Kalelkar	Nominated	
Nominated	Dr Radha Kumud Mookerjee	Nominated	
Orissa	Radhakrishna Biswasroy	Indian National Congress	Resigned 01/04/1957
Orissa	Bodh Ram Dube	Indian National Congress	
Orissa	Surendra Mohanty	Indian National Congress	Resigned 23/03/1957
PEPSU	Jagan Nath Kaushal	Indian National Congress	
Punjab	Sardar Swaran Singh	Indian National Congress	Resigned 21/03/1957
Punjab	Guraj Singh Dhillion	Indian National Congress	
Punjab	Mukund Lal Puri	Indian National Congress	Death 11/1/1953
Rajasthan	Sardar Singh	Indian National Congress	Resigned 16/09/1956
Rajasthan	Keshvanand	Indian National Congress	
Rajasthan	Laksman Singhji	Independent	
Rajasthan	Harish Chandra Mathur	Independent	
Saurashtra	Jaisukh Lal Hathi	Indian National Congress	Resigned 12/03/1957
Travancore & Cochin	S. Chattanatha Karayalar	Indian National Congress	
Travancore & Cochin	C. Narayan Pillai	Indian National Congress	
Uttar Pradesh	Jagannath Prasad Agrawal	Indian National Congress	
Uttar Pradesh	Nawab Singh Chauhan	Indian National Congress	
Uttar Pradesh	A. Dharam Das	Indian National Congress	
Uttar Pradesh	Indra Vidyavachaspati	Indian National Congress	
Uttar Pradesh	Shyam Dhar Misra	Indian National Congress	
Uttar Pradesh	B. K. Mukerjee	Indian National Congress	
Uttar Pradesh	Tarkeshwar Pande	Indian National Congress	
Uttar Pradesh	Pandit Sham Sundar Narain Tankha	Indian National Congress	
Uttar Pradesh	Thakur Das	Indian National Congress	
Vindyachal Pradesh	Banarasi Das Chaturvedi	Indian National Congress	
West Bengal	Bimal Comar Ghose	Praja Socialist Party	Resigned 21/03/1957
West Bengal	Beni Prasad Agrawal	Indian National Congress	
West Bengal	Maya Devi Chettry	Indian National Congress	
West Bengal	Bhupesh Gupta	Communist Party of India	
West Bengal	Satyendra Mazumdar	Communist Party of India	Resigned 05/04/1957

== By-elections ==
The following by-elections were held in the year 1952.

1952 Rajya Sabha by-election
- 7 August 1952 (2 seats); 22 August 1952 (1 seat) 10 November 1952 (1 seat)

4 (of 226 seats) to the Rajya Sabha 114 elected seats needed for a majority
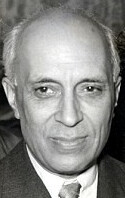
	First party	Second party
Leader	Jawaharlal Nehru	Ajoy Ghosh
Party	INC	CPI
Seats won	168	8
Seat change	▼4	Steady
Percentage	74.34%	3.54%
Swing	▼0.44%	▲0.06%

Rajya Sabha members for term 1952–1956
State	Member Name	Party	Remark
Bombay	Premji Leuva	Indian National Congress	Elected 07/08/1952
Bombay	Dr N. S. Hardikar	Indian National Congress	Elected 07/08/1952
Bombay	Lakhamshi Lavji	Indian National Congress	Elected 24/09/1952
Madhya Pradesh	Ramesh Agnibhoj	Indian National Congress	Elected 10/11/1952
Madras	Neelam Sanjiva Reddy	Indian National Congress	Elected 22/08/1952
