= 1954 Rajya Sabha elections =

Elections for the Upper House of Indian Parliament

80 (of 225 seats) in the Rajya Sabha 113 seats seats needed for a majority
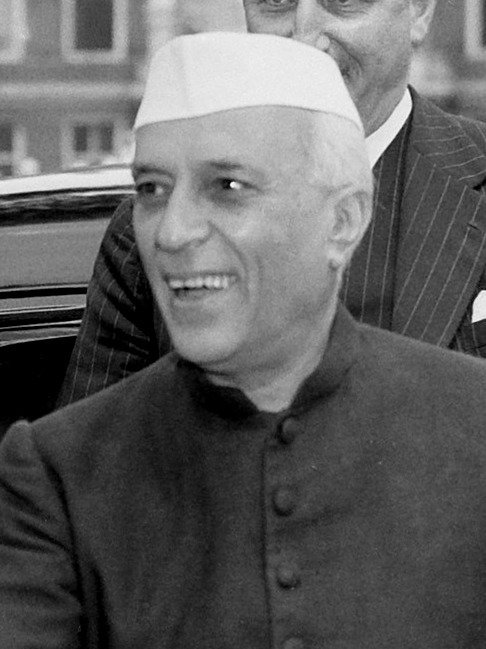
| | First party | Second party |
|---|---|---|
| | | CPI |
| Leader | Jawaharlal Nehru |
| Party | INC | CPI |
| Seats won | 173 | 10 |
| Seat change | ▲4 | ▲1 |
| Percentage | 76.89% | 4.44% |
| Swing | ▲2.77% | ▲0.49% |

Rajya Sabha elections were held in 1954, to elect members of the Rajya Sabha, Indian Parliament's upper chamber.

== Elections ==
Elections were held in 1954 to elect members from various states. The list is incomplete.

=== Members elected ===
The following members are elected in the elections held in 1954. They are members for the term 1952-54 by luck as decided in 1952 and retire in year 1954, except in case of the resignation or death before the term.

State - Member - Party

Rajya Sabha members for term 1954-1960
| State | Member Name | Party | Remark |
|---|---|---|---|
| Andhra | Makineni Basavapunnaiah | CPI | R |
| Andhra | Galib Shaik | INC | ( res. 12/07/1958 ) |
| Andhra | Akbar Ali Khan | INC | |
| Andhra | A Satyanarayana Raju | INC | |
| Andhra | J V K VallabhRao | CPI | |
| Ajmer and Coorg | K C Karumbaya | INC | ( term till 1956 ) |
| Assam | Fakhruddin Ali Ahmed | INC | Res. 25/03/1957 |
| Assam | Bedavati Buragohain | INC | |
| Bihar | Bodra Theodore | JMM | |
| Bihar | Ramdhari Singh Dinkar | INC | |
| Bihar | Kailash Bihari Lall | INC | Dea. 19/03/1960 |
| Bihar | Mahesh Saran | INC | |
| Bihar | Lakshmi N. Menon | INC | |
| Bihar | Dr Purna Chanda Mitra | INC | Dea. 23/08/1959 |
| Bihar | Rajendra Pratap Sinha | IND | |
| Bombay | Abid Ali Jaferbhai | INC | ( term till 1958 ) |
| Bombay | Violet Alva | INC | |
| Bombay | R V Dangre | INC | |
| Bombay | N B Deshmukh | OTH | |
| Bombay | Bhalchandra M Gupte | INC | |
| Bombay | Shreyans Prasad Jain | INC | ( term till 1958 ) |
| Bombay | Premji T Leuva | INC | |
| Bombay | Devkinandan Narayan | INC | |
| Bombay | Chandulal P Parikh | INC | ( term till 1958 ) |
| Hyderabad | V Prasad Rao | CPI | |
| Jammu & Kashmir | Trilochan Dutt | INC | |
| Kutch | Lakhamshi Lavji | INC | |
| Madhya Bharat | Dr Raghubir Sinh | INC | |
| Madhya Bharat | Gopikrishna Vijaivargiya | INC | |
| Madhya Pradesh | R P Dube | INC | |
| Madhya Pradesh | Kazi Syed Karimuddin | INC | ( term till 1958 ) |
| Madhya Pradesh | Ratanlal K. Malviya | INC | |
| Madhya Pradesh | Thakur Bhannu Pratap Singh | INC | |
| Madras | N. Gopalaswami Ayyangar | INC | |
| Madras | K. S. Hegde | INC | res. 21/08/1957 |
| Madras | E. K. Imbichi Bava | CPI | |
| Madras | T V Kamalaswamy | INC | |
| Madras | K Madhav Menon | INC | |
| Madras | P S Rajgopal Naidu | INC | |
| Madras | Parvathi Krishnan | OTH | 12/03/1957 |
| Madras | T Bhaskar Rao | INC | |
| Madras | Dr P. Subbarayan | INC | 04/03/1957 |
| Manipur & Tripura | Ng. Tompok Singh | INC | |
| Mysore | H. C. Dasappa | INC | Res. 25/03/1957 2LS |
| Mysore | K. Chengalaraya Reddy | INC | 18/03/1957 |
| Mysore | Raghvendra Rao | INC | |
| Nominated | Prof A. R. Wadia | NOM | |
| Nominated | Prof Satyendra Nath Bose | NOM | Res.02/07/1959 |
| Nominated | Prithviraj Kapoor | NOM | |
| Nominated | Moturi Satyanarayana | NOM. | |
| Orissa | Prafulla Chandra Banj Deo | OTH | Death 05/03/1959 |
| Orissa | Bishwanath Das | INC | |
| Orissa | S Panigrahi | INC | |
| Punjab | Dr Anup Singh | INC | |
| Punjab | Jathedar Udham Singh Nagoke | INC | |
| Punjab | M H S Nihal Singh | INC | |
| P E P S U | Sardar Raghbir Singh | INC | |
| Rajasthan | Barkatullah Khan | INC | Res. 25/03/1957 |
| Rajasthan | Adiyendra | INC | |
| Rajasthan | Vijay Singh | INC | |
| Saurashtra | Dr D H Variava | INC | |
| Travancore & Cochin | K Udayabhau Bharti | INC | term till 1958 |
| Travancore & Cochin | N C Sekhar | INC | |
| Uttar Pradesh | Amarnath Agarwal | INC | |
| Uttar Pradesh | Amolakh Chand | INC | |
| Uttar Pradesh | Ram Chandra Gupta | INC | |
| Uttar Pradesh | Ahmed Syed Khan | INC | |
| Uttar Pradesh | M M Faruqi | INC | |
| Uttar Pradesh | Narendra Deva | OTH | Death 20/02/1956 |
| Uttar Pradesh | Brij Bihari Sharma | INC | |
| Uttar Pradesh | Lal Bahadur Shastri | INC | Res 13/03/1957 -2LS |
| Uttar Pradesh | Bapu Gopinath Singh | INC | |
| Uttar Pradesh | Sumat Prasad | INC | 12/03/1957 - 2LS |
| Vindyachal Pradesh | Krishna Kumari | INC | |
| Vindyachal Pradesh | Awadhesh Pratap Singh | INC | |
| West Bengal | Charu Chandra Biswas | INC | |
| West Bengal | Rajpat Singh Doogar | INC | |
| West Bengal | Nalinaskha Dutt | INC | |
| West Bengal | Abdul Razzak Khan | CPI | |
| West Bengal | Suresh Chandra Majumdar | INC | Death 12/08/1954 |

== Bye-elections ==
The following bye elections were held in the year 1954.

1. Andhra - B V Gurumoorthy - INC ( elec 15/02/1954 term till 1956 )
2. Bombay - Narayan K Daga - INC ( elec 23/04/1954 term till 1958 )
3. West Bengal - Mriganka M Sur - INC ( elec 13/09/1954 term till 1960 )
