= 1952 Tripura Electoral College election =

Elections to a 30-member Electoral College were held in the Indian state of Tripura in January 1952. The Electoral College was a unique arrangements for "Part C" states that didn't have an elected Legislative Assembly to allow for the election of representatives in the Rajya Sabha (the upper house of the Parliament of India). The Tripura Electoral College election was held in parallel to the 1952 Lok Sabha (lower house of the Parliament of India) election, and occurred in the immediate aftermath of the armed struggle waged by the communist-led Ganamukti Parishad (GMP). The Communist Party of India (CPI) formed a United Front to contest the election, which won a majority of the Electoral College seats.

== Background ==
After the Independence of India, the Constitution of the country outlined that the states of Tripura and Manipur would share a single seat in the Rajya Sabha (the upper house of the Parliament of India). As the "Part C" states like Tripura and Manipur did not have any elected Legislative Assemblies, instead being ruled by a Chief Commissioner on behalf of the President of India, Electoral Colleges were elected whose sole function was to elected a Rajya Sabha parliamentarian. The Tripura Electoral College would elect the Rajya Sabha member for the 1952-1954 period and had thirty single-member seats. The Electoral College election was held parallel to the first Lok Sabha election, with 329,806 voters registered in Tripura. Voter registration had been conducted discriminately, with some areas dominated by non-Congress excluded by the administration due to 'communist lawlessness and vandalism'.

The Communist Party of India began preparing for elections in Tripura in early 1951, when the armed struggle of its mass front Ganamukti Parishad (GMP) was at its peak. The May 1, 1951 rallies in Tripura were used for mobilization by CPI for the upcoming elections. CPI set-up election committees across state, and national party leaders would visit the state to address campaign gatherings. On October 2, 1951 a large mass rally was organized in Agartala on the Durbar Ground by the CPI, GMP, Ganatantrik Nari Samiti, and Tea Workers Union in co-operation with the Forward Bloc (Ruikar) and the Tripura Ganatantrik Sangha (TGS).

On November 15, 1951 a United Front coalition was formed by CPI, GMP, TGS, Ganatantrik Nari Samiti, and independents to contest the upcoming Electoral College vote, on basis of a three-point program: to defeat of the Congress Party, for the restoration of democratic rights and the establishment of a people's responsible government in the state. The CPI-led United Front began organizing meetings in localities across the state, raising questions on food, relief, peace and democratic rights. The main campaign demands raised by the United Front were the installation of a Legislative Assembly, introduction of a responsible government, abolishing Chief Commissioner's rule, granting civic and political rights, rehabilitation of jhumia communities displaces by refugees, and rehabilitation of refugees.

A second mass rally in Agartala was scheduled for December 2, 1951. A reception committee was set up with Forward Bloc leader Sailen Sen as president and Biren Dutta as secretary, with participation of leaders of TGS, GMP and at least 26 other mass organizations. The rally was to be held at the Durbar Ground, but had to be moved to a Pratapgarh rice field at the last minute due to withdrawal of permission by the authorities. Key speakers included national CPI leaders Muzaffar Ahmad and S.A. Dange.

The preparations for the elections occurred in a context of tensions and accusations that the administration was biased in favour of the Congress Party. Police cases were lodged and arrest warrants were issued against communist leaders. On December 6, 1951, Prabhat Ray (editor of Chiniha and candidate in the Electoral College election) was arrested. Arrest warrants were also taken out against communist candidates Dasarath Deb (CPI candidate for Tripura East Lok Sabha seat), Sudhanwa Debbarma, and Hemanta Debbarma throughout the electoral process.

On December 29, 1951 a number of United Front candidates were conditionally released from jail. The candidates were released only for the period of the remainder of the electoral process and were to report back at Agartala Central Jail on February 1, 1952. Additional conditions for the temporary release were that the candidates agreed not travel between constituencies without prior permission from the District Magistrate and not to 'indulge in any illegal or terrorist activities'. The candidates conditionally released included Prabhat Ray, Banshi Thakur, Biren Datta (CPI candidate for the Tripura West Lok Sabha seat) and Seerajul Islam. A third United Front mass rally was held in Agartala on December 30, 1951, at which the release of CPI and TGS leaders was celebrated as a victory. The slogan 'Forfeit Security Deposits of the Congress and reactionary forces in the coming elections' was raised at the rally. The main speaker at the December 30, 1951 rally was CPI general secretary Ajoy Ghosh.

== Uncontested winners ==
Nominations were scrutinized on December 8, 1951. After the scrutiny of nominations after withdrawals of candidatures, six constituencies had only one candidate each. Thus three Congress candidates, two CPI candidates, and one TGS candidate were elected unopposed.

Of the 27 seats contested by the United Front, 16 had CPI candidates, five had TGS candidates, and five were contested by independent candidates supported by the United Front. Generally speaking CPI candidates contested GMP strongholds, leaving less secure seats for their allies. The exception was the Reang-dominated Belonia subdivision, which was not a communist stronghold but where CPI contested both seats. The United Front independents mainly contested constituencies in northern Tripura.

The Tripura State Congress fielded 24 candidates, out of whom 18 were Bengalis (mostly from upper castes). The Forward Bloc (Ruikar) had been aligned with the United Front, and participated in the United Front mass rallies of October 2, 1951 and December 2, 1951. However, at the last possible moment the party had pulled out from the United Front and decided to contest three seats on their own. Apart from the United Front, the Congress and Forward Bloc (Ruikar) there were also a number of independents in the fray.

== Results ==
Voting took place on January 11, 16 and 26, 1952. The United Front emerged victorious in the election - with 12 seats won by the CPI, 3 by TGS and 4 by United Front-supported independents. The Congress won nine seats and one independent supported by the Congress (Kshetra Majumdar) was elected. One independent candidate, elected from Belonia, had contested against both the United Front and the Congress. CPI voters were mainly rural, but its ally TGS had been able to make some inroads in areas where CPI had weak support. The United Front overwhelmingly won the vote from tribal and Muslim communities. The Congress had a strong backing in urban areas and among Hindu refugees. The Reang community in Udaipur had largely boycotted the election over the absence of monarchy in the state.

Out of the 12 seats won by CPI, the party had won 7 out of 10 seats in Agartala Sadar Sub-Division, all three seats from the Khowai Sub-Division, one of the two seats in the Kamalpur Sub-Division, and one of the two seats in the Kailashahar Sub-Division. In Agartala city, the Congress, TGS, and CPI won one seat each. The result indicated a level of support for CPI among urban upper caste Bengali Hindus (who constituted 84.58% of the city population), in contrast to the earlier municipal elections that CPI had lost.

=== Party-wise result ===
Summary of results of the 1952 Tripura Electoral College election
	Political party	Seats Contested	Won	% of Seats	Votes	Vote %
	Communist Party of India	16	12	40.00	55,603	43.22
	Indian National Congress	24	9	30.00	36,167	28.11
	Tripura Ganatantrik Sangha	5	3	10.00	6,221	4.84
	Forward Bloc (Ruikar)	3	0	0.00	2,775	2.16
	Independent politician	15 (Note: There were 35 independent candidates all in all. The United Front supported 6 independent candidates, out of whom 4 were elected. The Congress supported one of the elected independents.)	6	20.00	27,886	21.68
Total Seats		30	Voters	329,806	Turnout	128,652 (47.36%)
Notes						

=== Constituency-wise result ===
Constituency		Electorate	Valid votes	Turn-out (%)	United Front			Congress			Independents and Forward Bloc		
No.	Name	Electorate	Valid votes	Turn-out (%)	Candidate	Votes	%	Candidate	Votes	%	Candidate	Votes	%
1	Mohonpur	11,227	8,326	74.16%	Promode Ranjan Das Gupta (CPI)	7,671	92.13%	Amiya Kumar Roy	471	5.66%	Rani Nilima Devi	184	2.21%
2	Agartala Sadar I	9,673	4,683	48.41%	Hemanta Debbarma (CPI)	3,418	72.99%	Mugbhul Hossain	984	21.01%	Prafulla Chandra Sarker	169	3.61%
2	Agartala Sadar I	9,673	4,683	48.41%	Hemanta Debbarma (CPI)	3,418	72.99%	Mugbhul Hossain	984	21.01%	Taleb Miah	112	2.39%
3	Agartala Sadar II	9,434	3,198	33.90%	Atikul Islam (CPI)	1,647	51.50%	Sonatan Sarker	1,551	48.50%			
4	Agartala Sadar III	8,502	Uncontested		Sudhanwa Debbarma (CPI)								
5	Agartala Town II	8,329	2,951	35.43%	Nandalal Chakraborty (TGS)	1,563	52.97%				Anil Kumar Das Gupta (FB)	1,388	47.03%
6	Agartala Town III	9,203	3,211	34.89%	Saroj Ranjan Chanda (CPI)	464	14.45%	Umeshlal Sinha	1,937	60.32%	Dwijen Dey (FB)	810	25.23%
7	Old Agartala	16,556	11,076	66.9%	Seerajul Islam (CPI)	10,154	91.68%				Bankim Bihari Debbarma	922	8.32%
8	Takarjala	7,313	Uncontested		Birchandra Debbarma (TGS)								
9	Bishalgarh	10,726	7,279	67.86%	Aftabuddin (CPI)	5,360	73.64%	Baishnab Chanran Shaha	1,048	14.40%	Shyama Kauta Choudhry	717	9.85%
9	Bishalgarh	10,726	7,279	67.86%	Aftabuddin (CPI)	5,360	73.64%	Baishnab Chanran Shaha	1,048	14.40%	Muktal Hossain	154	2.12%
10	Charilam	9,059	Uncontested		Aghore Chandra Debbarma (CPI)								
11	Sonamura North	10,029	Uncontested					Janab Kala Miah					
12	Sonamura South	10,029	3,939	39.28%	Subodh Kumar Gangopadhyaya (TGS)	1,567	39.78%	Krishnachandra Debbarma	2,372	60.22%			
13	Belonia	9,228	3,117	33.78%	Khargarai Riang (CPI)	415	13.31%	Anil Chakraborty	797	25.57%	Jainal Abedin	1,031	33.08%
13	Belonia	9,228	3,117	33.78%	Khargarai Riang (CPI)	415	13.31%	Anil Chakraborty	797	25.57%	Bancharam Roaja	466	14.95%
13	Belonia	9,228	3,117	33.78%	Khargarai Riang (CPI)	415	13.31%	Anil Chakraborty	797	25.57%	Surendra Kumar Biswas	408	13.09%
14	Muhuripur	9,718	3,368	34.66%	Charan Pai Riang (CPI)	958	28.44%	Kshetra Mohon Majumdar (Congress ind.)	1,534	45.55%	Sujaio Choudhry	800	23.75%
14	Muhuripur	9,718	3,368	34.66%	Charan Pai Riang (CPI)	958	28.44%	Kshetra Mohon Majumdar (Congress ind.)	1,534	45.55%	Dinesh Chandra Chakraborty	76	2.26%
15	Sabroom	11,173	4,212	37.70%	Bangshi Debbarma (UF ind.)	1,696	40.27%	Angajoy Choudhry	800	18.99%	Surendra Kumar Sil (FB)	577	13.7%
15	Sabroom	11,173	4,212	37.70%	Bangshi Debbarma (UF ind.)	1,696	40.27%	Angajoy Choudhry	800	18.99%	Adhar Chandra Basak	505	11.99%
15	Sabroom	11,173	4,212	37.70%	Bangshi Debbarma (UF ind.)	1,696	40.27%	Angajoy Choudhry	800	18.99%	Mathihari Choudhry	356	8.45%
15	Sabroom	11,173	4,212	37.70%	Bangshi Debbarma (UF ind.)	1,696	40.27%	Angajoy Choudhry	800	18.99%	Sekendar Mirja	278	6.60%
16	Khowai-Ashrambari	12,336	6,554	53.13%	Satish Chakraborty (CPI)	4,906	74.86%	Jadu Prasanna Bhattacharjee	1,648	25.14%			
17	Khowai-Kalyanpur	13,523	9,347	69.12%	Kiran Mala Debi (CPI)	9,052	96.84%	Prahlad Chandra Shome	295	3.16%			
18	Kalyanpur-South	11,434	7,099	62.09%	Ram Charan (CPI)	4,322	60.88%	Gunamani Sardar	2,777	39.12%			
19	Kulaihour	8,393	4,230	50.40%	Krishnamani Tripura (CPI)	3,562	84.21%	Sunil Chandra Dutta	668	15.79%			
20	Kamalpur	9,128	5,037	55.18%	Gana Sinha (UF ind.)	2,926	58.09%	Babu Chand Sinha	1,091	21.66%	Debendra Dutta	722	14.33%
20	Kamalpur	9,128	5,037	55.18%	Gana Sinha (UF ind.)	2,926	58.09%	Babu Chand Sinha	1,091	21.66%	Banka Bihari Bhattacharjee	298	5.92%
21	Kailasahar	17,068	7,318	42.88%				Abdul Latif	4,447	60.77%	Kiriti Chandra Sinha	1,523	20.81%
21	Kailasahar	17,068	7,318	42.88%				Abdul Latif	4,447	60.77%	Usha Ranjan Sinha Roy	841	11.49%
21	Kailasahar	17,068	7,318	42.88%				Abdul Latif	4,447	60.77%	Jogendra Malakar	295	4.03%
21	Kailasahar	17,068	7,318	42.88%				Abdul Latif	4,447	60.77%	Musak Ali Choudhry	212	2.90%
22	Fatikroy	16,001	5,293	33.08%	Gokul Chandra Sinha (CPI)	2,994	56.57%	Satchhidananda Dhar	1,660	31.36%	Ram Sundar Paul	410	7.75%
22	Fatikroy	16,001	5,293	33.08%	Gokul Chandra Sinha (CPI)	2,994	56.57%	Satchhidananda Dhar	1,660	31.36%	Abdul Sattar	229	4.33%
23	Kanchanpur	8,453	1,666	19.71%	Mangal Singh Tripura (CPI)	680	40.82%	Madhab Chandra Master	986	59.18%			
24	Kurte	8,652	5,027	58.10%				Basaratullah	2,820	56.10%	Birendra Chandra Bhattacharjee	1,292	25.70%
24	Kurte	8,652	5,027	58.10%				Basaratullah	2,820	56.10%	Abdul Satar Choudhry	737	14.66%
24	Kurte	8,652	5,027	58.10%				Basaratullah	2,820	56.10%	Abdul Bari Choudhry	178	3.54%
25	Dharmanagar North	11,510	6,308	54.80%	Damanjit Rajkumar (TGS)	1,049	16.63%	Karun Chandra Nath	3,873	61.40%	Adhar Chandra Paul	1,212	19.21%
25	Dharmanagar North	11,510	6,308	54.80%	Damanjit Rajkumar (TGS)	1,049	16.63%	Karun Chandra Nath	3,873	61.40%	Banka Behari Bhattacharjee	174	2.76%
26	Dharmanagar South	11,570	5,933	51.28%	Abdul Wajid (UF ind.)	2,823	47.58%	Gaya Prasad Trivedi	2,260	38.09%	Nripendra Kumar Bhattacharjee	651	10.97%
26	Dharmanagar South	11,570	5,933	51.28%	Abdul Wajid (UF ind.)	2,823	47.58%	Gaya Prasad Trivedi	2,260	38.09%	Naba Krishana Choudhry	199	3.35%
27	Radhakishorepur	17,064	5,079	29.76%	Ershad Ali Choudhry (UF Ind.)	3,065	60.35%	Brajalal Debbarma	2,014	39.65%			
28	Salgarh	11,245	4,401	39.14%	Manindra Kishore Choudhry (TGS)	2,042	46.40%	Abdul Gafur	1,668	37.90%	Adhar Chandra Jamatia	691	15.70%
29	Dhumburnagar	11,612	Uncontested					Pyari Mohan Jang					
30	Birganja	11,618	Uncontested					Garu Miah					

== Aftermath ==
Immediately after the election, the Congress sought to recruit defectors to gain a majority in the Electoral College. They managed to convince Abdul Wajid and Ershad Ali Choudhry from the United Front and the independent Jainal Abedin to cross over to the Congress ranks. Thus the tally in the Tripura Electoral College changed to 17 seats for the United Front and 13 seats for the Congress bloc. Once the Tripura Electoral College gathered for the vote for the Rajya Sabha seat, there were two candidates. The candidate of CPI and their allies, Arman Ali Munshi, was elected to the Rajya Sabha with 14 votes against 13 votes for the Congress candidate Umeshlal Sinha. After the Rajya Sabha vote, Gana Sinha, Banshi Thakur and Seerajul Islam joined the Congress, giving the Congress bloc a majority position in the Electoral College.

== See also ==
- 1952 Rajya Sabha elections
- 1952 Kutch Electoral College election
