= Samiullah Khan (disambiguation) =

Samiullah Khan or Samiulla Khan or Sami Ullah Khan can refer to:

- Samiullah Khan, governor of the princely state of Sahaspur in India
- Samiullah Khan (cricketer), Pakistani international cricketer
- Samiullah Khan (field hockey), Pakistani field hockey player
- Samiullah Khan (politician), Pakistani politician
- Samiulla Khan, former Indian politician
- Sami Ullah Khan, Pakistani politician
