= 1952 Kutch Electoral College election =

- January 14, 1952

All 30 seats on the Kutch Electoral College
- Registered: 288,400
- Turnout: 42.77%
	Majority party	Minority party	Third party
Party	INC	Independent	Socialist
Seats won	28	2	0
Popular vote	73,213	37,521	4,461
Percentage	63.44%	32.51%	3.87%
- Kutch State
Elected Rajya Sabha member
Premji Bhavanji Thacker
INC

Elections to the Kutch Electoral College took place in Kutch State, India, on January 14, 1952, which in turn elected one member of the Rajya Sabha (upper house of the Parliament of India). The election was won by the Indian National Congress, who obtained 28 out of 30 seats. Independents won the two remaining seats.

== Background ==
After Independence, the Constitution of India stipulated that the Parliament of India would have two houses - a lower house (Lok Sabha, 'Council of the People') elected directly through popular suffrage and an upper house (Rajya Sabha, 'Council of the States') elected by the legislatures of the different states. Ahead of the 1951-1952 elections, the first general elections in independent India, Kutch had been classified as a Part "C" state. Whilst some other Part "C" states would have elected state governments under the Government of Part "C" States Act, 1951 no such measures were introduced in Kutch. Kutch had no state legislature, and was ruled by the central government through a Chief Commissioner. Per the Representation of the People Act, 1951 Kutch would elect a 30-member Electoral College, which in turn would elect one member of the Rajya Sabha.

== Electorate and candidatures ==
Kutch State had a population of 567,606, and an electorate of 288,400 eligible voters. Thirty single-member constituencies were created for the Kutch Electoral College.

102 candidates filed their nominations ahead of the election (47 from the Indian National Congress, 5 from the Socialist Party and 48 others). 31 candidates withdrew their nominations and 1 nomination was rejected. The Indian National Congress was the sole political party with a real organization in the state. Many of the candidates running as independents belonged to the Kutch Rajput Sabha, a right-wing organization. The Socialist Party did some campaigning before the election. There were no female candidates in the fray.

== Voting ==
Voting took place on January 14, 1952, and the voted were counted by January 24, 1952. 115,412 voters took part in the election. The Congress Party won 28 seats and 2 seats went to independent candidates. In two seats no election was held, as Congress Party candidates were elected unopposed (Maneklal Nensi in Adhoi and Hetubha Ravaji in Bhachau). Of the remaining constituencies, there were 18 straight contests (i.e. only two candidates) and 10 multi-cornered contests. Independents managed to win one straight contest and one multi-cornered contest. All other seats were won by Congress Party candidates. 13 candidates forfeited their deposits (10 independents, 2 socialists and 1 Congress candidate). After the 1952 elections the Kutch Rajput Sabha joined the Indian National Congress (although they later parted ways with the Congress Party in 1958).

== Aftermath ==
The Kutch Electoral College elected the Congress Party leader Premji Bhawanji Thacker to the Rajya Sabha, who contested unopposed. The Kutch Electoral College would later elect the Congress candidate Lavji Lakhamshi Thacker unopposed to fill the Rajya Sabha seat. Three by-elections to the Kutch Electoral College were held, all three won by Congress Party candidates running unopposed. Rajput Vagjibhai Keshavji was elected from the Mundra seat and Jadeja Kumar Shree Jethi Singhji from the Mothela seat. Later (during the period of mid-1955 to 1956) Lohana Khatau Pragji was elected from the Gadhsisa seat.

In the process of the merger of Kutch into Bombay State in 1956, the Kutch Electoral College elected Karsondas Hirji to become a Member of the Bombay Legislative Council.

== Results table ==
1952 Kutch Electoral College election (Winning candidates in bold)
Nº	Constituency	Nº of candidates	Electorate	Valid votes	Turn-out	Congress candidates			Independent candidates			Socialist Party candidates		
Nº	Constituency	Nº of candidates	Electorate	Valid votes	Turn-out	Name	Votes	%	Name	Votes	%	Name	Votes	%
1	Bhuj	2	9,857	3,953	40.10	**Jamiatrai Gulabshanker**	2,293	58.01	Thacker Dayaram Bhawanji	1,660	41.99			
2	Madhapar	2	10,407	4,075	39.16	**Premj Bhawanji Thacker**	2,746	67.39	Nagar Krishnalal Nautamlal	1,329	32.61			
3	Khadwa	2	10,398	3,184	30.62	**Vakil Mulshanker Kunverji**	1,934	60.74	Surji Umarsi	1,249	39.23			
4	Kera	2	9,496	4,025	42.39	**Hirjibhai Ranchhoddas Kotak**	2,748	68.27	Khoja Ahmed Hasan	1,277	31.73			
5	Mankuwa	3	10,218	4,402	43.08	**Manharlal Navji Kayesth**	1,735	39.41	Jadeja Chandrasinh Harisinh	1,346	30.58			
5	Mankuwa	3	10,218	4,402	43.08	**Manharlal Navji Kayesth**	1,735	39.41	Kanbi Bechar Samji	1,321	30.01			
6	Anjar	3	10,735	4,187	39.00	**Purshottam Samji**	2,851	68.09	Soni Kanji Premji	1,136	27.13			
6	Anjar	3	10,735	4,187	39.00	**Purshottam Samji**	2,851	68.09	Mehta Vrijlal Ravishanker	200	4.78			
7	Gandhidham	3	10,978	3,006	27.38	**Dungarsi Purshottam Lohana**	2,007	66.77	Kanji Vasa	846	28.14			
7	Gandhidham	3	10,978	3,006	27.38	**Dungarsi Purshottam Lohana**	2,007	66.77	Dave Mugatram Makanji	153	5.09			
8	Ratnal	2	11,311	3,341	29.54	Mehta Kantiprasad Chandrashanker	1,342	40.17	**Shivubha Morji Jadeja**	1,997	59.77			
9	Adhoi	1	9,323			**Maneklal Nensi**	unopposed							
10	Bhachau	1	9,236			**Hetubha Ravaji**	unopposed							
11	Lakadia	2	8,586	2,302	26.81	**Motilal Lakhman Jain**	2,009	87.27	Jain Vijpar Naran	293	12.73			
12	Rapar	2	9,156	3,226	35.23	**Jadavji Mansang Lohana**	1,861	57.69	Jadavji Raghavji	1,365	42.31			
13	Fatehgad	2	9,371	3,173	33.86	**Sarupchand Nyalchand**	2,253	71.01	Vaghela Dolubhai Bhurubha	920	28.99			
14	Kidianagar	3	9,430	3,543	37.57	**Vanechand Dharamsi**	1,879	53.03	Vaghela Jivansangji Meghrajji	1,374	38.78			
14	Kidianagar	3	9,430	3,543	37.57	**Vanechand Dharamsi**	1,879	53.03	Jain Sakarchand Somchand	290	8.19			
15	Adesar	2	8,892	2,897	32.58	**Nanalal Ramchand**	1,583	54.64	Lohana Chhaganlal Pragji	1,314	45.36			
16	Mandvi	4	10,213	4,965	48.61	Sha Maneklal Purshottam	427	8.60	**Kothari Hariram Nathubhai**	2,289	46.10			
16	Mandvi	4	10,213	4,965	48.61	Sha Maneklal Purshottam	427	8.60	Noshir Dorabji Dastur	2,023	40.75			
16	Mandvi	4	10,213	4,965	48.61	Sha Maneklal Purshottam	427	8.60	Gu. Govindgarji Rughnathgarji	226	4.55			
17	Maska	3	9,9738	4,799	49.28	**Shivlal Amarji Garanara**	3,112	64.85	Sha Kunverji Shivjia	1,287	26.82	Vakil Rupshanker Ganpatram	400	8.34
18	Bidada	2	9,709	5,878	60.54	**Shivji Narsi**	3,756	63.90	Javantilal Popatlal	2,122	36.10			
19	Gadhsisa	3	10,146	5,635	55.54	**Thacker Govindji Mavji**	3,310	58.74	Jadeja Ranjitsinhji Meramanji	1,169	20.75	Karanshi Vishram	1,156	20.51
20	Laija (Mota)	2	9,558	5,229	54.71	**Mavji Ramji Joshi**	4,021	76.90	Jain Keshavji Ashu	1,208	23.10			
21	Mundra	2	9,009	4,832	53.64	**Ranchhodbhai Nathabhai Jain**	3,124	64.65	Bha. Narandas Vallabhdas	1,708	35.35			
22	Bhadreswar	2	9,343	4,221	45.18	**Khivji Jevat**	2,750	65.15	Hala Jujarsinhji Premsinhji	1,471	34.85			
23	Bhujpar	2	9,643	4,245	44.02	**Maganlal Velji**	3,358	79.10	Gordhandas Morarji	887	20.90			
24	Roha (Sumri)	3	9,412	4,672	49.64	**Mansukh Khimkaran Barot**	3,036	64.98	Pandya Hiralal Samji	750	16.05	Ladha Manji	886	18.96
25	Nakhatrana	3	9,371	5,073	54.14	**Nathu Nanji**	3,143	61.96	Lohana Karsandas Kunverji	1,314	25.90	Daya Kanji	616	12.14
26	Netra	3	8,882	4,559	51.33	**Jugatram Dalpatram Bhrahmin**	2,445	53.63	Bra. Jatashanker Gokaldas	711	15.60	Khimji Mavji	1,403	30.77
27	Naliya	2	10,013	3,936	39.31	**Lohana Jethma Visharji**	3,368	85.57	Sarswat Laxminarain Lalji	568	14.43			
28	Kothara	2	10,052	4,916	48.91	**Karsondas Hirji**	4,429	90.09	Umedsinhji Mamubha	487	9.91			
29	Mothela	2	9,274	4,730	51.00	**Jadeja Arjanji Jethuji**	4,041	85.43	Jadeja Malaji Devaji	689	14.57			
30	Lakhpat	3	6,643	2,400	36.13	**Kharashanker Jatashanker Joshi**	1,652	68.83	Samji Khatau	542	22.58			
30	Lakhpat	3	6,643	2,400	36.13	**Kharashanker Jatashanker Joshi**	1,652	68.83	Mansangji Noganji	206	8.58			
	Total	70	288,400	115,404	42.77		73,213	63.44		37,521	32.51		4,461	3.87

== See also ==
- 1952 Rajya Sabha elections
- 1952 Tripura Electoral College election
