= Lakhanpal, Punjab =

Lakhanpal
- Village
- Location in Punjab, India Lakhanpal (India)
- Coordinates: 31.1828731°N 75.6458302°E
- Country: India
- State: Punjab
- District: Jalandhar

Government
  - Type: Panchayat raj
  - Body: Gram panchayat
- Elevation: 240 m (790 ft)

Population (2011)
  - Total: 1,270
- Sex ratio 619/651 ♂/♀

Languages
  - Official: Punjabi
- Time zone: UTC+5:30 (IST)
- PIN: 144633
- Telephone: 01824
- ISO 3166 code: IN-PB
- Vehicle registration: PB- 08
- Post office: Sarhali (Jalandhar)
- Website: jalandhar.nic.in

Lakhanpal is a village in Jalandhar district of Punjab State, India. It is located 3.4 km away from postal head office in Sarhali, 14 km from Phagwara, 24.6 km from district headquarter Jalandhar and 142 km from state capital Chandigarh. The village is administrated by a sarpanch, who is an elected representative.

== Education ==
The village has a Punjabi medium, co-ed primary school (GPS Lakhanpal). The school provide mid-day meal as per Indian Midday Meal Scheme and the meal prepared in school premises and it was founded in 1955.

== Demography ==
According to the report published by Census India in 2011, Lakhanpal has a total number of 273 houses and population of 1270 of which include 619 males and 651 females. The literacy rate of Lakhanpal is 78.93%, higher than state average of 75.84%. The population of children under the age of 6 years is 126 which is 9.92% of total population of Lakhanpal, and child sex ratio is approximately 853 higher than state average of 846.

Most of the people are from Schedule Caste which constitutes 65.98% of total population in Lakhanpal. The town does not have any Schedule Tribe population so far.

As per census 2011, 377 people were engaged in work activities out of the total population of Lakhanpal which includes 318 males and 59 females. According to census survey report 2011, 93.90% workers describe their work as main work and 6.10% workers are involved in marginal activity providing livelihood for less than 6 months.

== Transport ==
Phagwara Junction railway station is the nearest train station however, Phillaur Junction train station is 31.5 km away from the village. The village is 68.6 km away from domestic airport in Ludhiana and the nearest international airport is located in Chandigarh also Sri Guru Ram Dass Jee International Airport is the second nearest airport which is 126 km away in Amritsar.

== See also ==
- Lakhanpal
