= Arman Ali Munshi =

Arman Ali Munshi (born 1893) was an Indian lawyer and politician. He was the first representative of the state of Tripura in the Rajya Sabha (the upper house of the Parliament of India) between 1952 and 1954, having been elected with the support from the Communist Party of India (CPI).

== Biography ==
Arman Ali Munshi was born in January 1893 in Tripura, the son of Ajlish Bhuya. Arman Ali married Begum Shamsia Khatoon in March 1919, with whom he would have four sons and two daughters. and was educated at the Umakanta Academy in Agartala and at Ripon College in Calcutta.

In 1946 Arman Ali Munshi and Farid Mian founded the Tripura Rajya Muslim Praja Majlish, a Muslim party that opposed partition of Tripura along communal lines. Arman Ali became the president of the organization.

Arman Ali was a member of the Tripura Constituent Assembly and the editor of the publication Landar. He became a member of the State Transport Assembly in 1948 and a member of the Tripura Minority Board in 1950. That year, he also became chairman of the Agartala Municipality, which he left in 1951.

== Parliamentarian ==
At the time of the 1952 Tripura Electoral College election, Arman Ali belonged to the Tripura Ganatantrik Sangha (TGS). After the election, the CPI-led United Front majority in the Electoral College elected Arman Ali as the first deputy of Tripura to the Rajya Sabha. Arman Ali was elected with 14 votes against 13 votes for the Congress candidate Umeshlal Sinha. Arman Ali's mandate in the Rajya Sabha lasted from April 3, 1952, until April 2, 1954. In the Rajya Sabha Arman Ali advocated for the institution of a Legislative Assembly for Tripura.

At the time of his Rajya Sabha tenure he served as the president of the Agartala Kamilia Madarsa, president of the Distribution Committee, president of the Pragati Bidhyabhavan Committee, vice president of the Matri Seva Sadan, and was a member of the V.M. Hospital Committee, the T.B. Association, the Umakanta Academy of Agartala, the Bari Bidya Pith School Committee and the Tripura Evacuee Management Committee. Arman Ali Munshi lived in Agartala.
