= Bantval Assembly constituency =

Legislative Assembly constituency in Karnataka State, India

Coordinates: 12.89°N 75.02°E

Bantval
- Constituency No. 205 for the Karnataka Legislative Assembly

Constituency details
- Country: India
- Region: South India
- State: Karnataka
- District: Dakshina Kannada
- Lok Sabha constituency: Dakshina Kannada
- Established: 1957
- Total electors: 228,415 (2023)
- Reservation: None

Member of Legislative Assembly
- 16th Karnataka Legislative Assembly
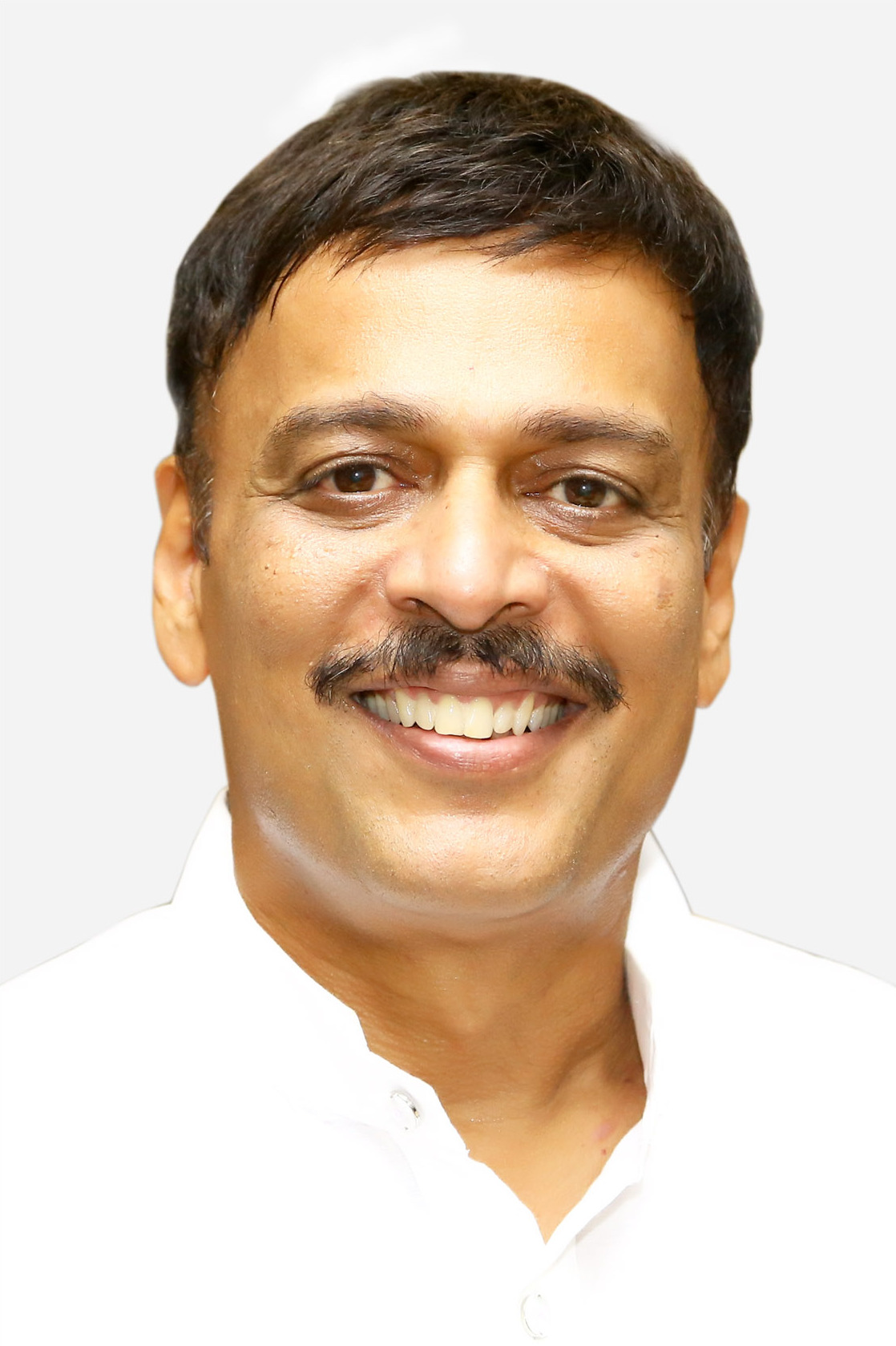
- Incumbent U. Rajesh Naik
- Party: Bharatiya Janata Party
- Elected year: 2023
- Preceded by: Ramanath Rai

Bantval Assembly constituency is one of the 224 Legislative Assembly constituencies of Karnataka in India.

It is part of Dakshina Kannada district.

== Members of the Legislative Assembly ==
Election	Member	Party
1967	K. L. Rai	Indian National Congress
1972	B. V. Kakkilaya	Communist Party of India
1978	B. A. Mohideen	Indian National Congress
1983	N. Shiva Rao	Bharatiya Janata Party
1985	Ramanath Rai	Indian National Congress
1989	Ramanath Rai	Indian National Congress
1994	Ramanath Rai	Indian National Congress
1999	Ramanath Rai	Indian National Congress
2004	B. Nagaraja Shetty	Bharatiya Janata Party
2008	Ramanath Rai	Indian National Congress
2013	Ramanath Rai	Indian National Congress
2018	U. Rajesh Naik	Bharatiya Janata Party
2023	U. Rajesh Naik	Bharatiya Janata Party

== Election results ==
=== Assembly Election 2023 ===
2023 Karnataka Legislative Assembly election: Bantval
Party	Candidate	Votes	%	±%
BJP	U. Rajesh Naik	93,324	50.29	▼3.28
INC	Ramanath Rai	85,042	45.83	▲1.00
SDPI	Ilyas Mohammed Thumbe	5,436	2.93	New
NOTA	None of the above	821	0.44	▼0.08
Margin of victory		8,282	4.46	▼4.29
Turnout		185,916	81.39	▼1.01
Total valid votes		185,572		
Registered electors		228,415		▲3.00
BJP hold		Swing	▼3.28	

=== Assembly Election 2018 ===
Karnataka Legislative Assembly Election, 2018: Bantval
Party	Candidate	Votes	%	±%
BJP	U. Rajesh Naik	97,802	53.57	▲8.88
INC	Ramanath Rai	81,831	44.83	▼12.36
NOTA	None of the above	946	0.52	New
Margin of victory		15,971	8.75	▼3.75
Turnout		182,737	82.40	▲3.08
Total valid votes		182,555		
Registered electors		221,765		▲12.54
BJP gain from INC		Swing	▼3.62	

=== Assembly Election 2013 ===
2013 Karnataka Legislative Assembly election : Bantval
Party	Candidate	Votes	%	±%
INC	Ramanath Rai	81,665	47.19	▲1.67
BJP	Rajesh Naik Ulipady	63,815	44.69	▲0.09
SDPI	Advocate Abdul Majid	6,113	4.28	New
JD(S)	Krishnappa Poojary Kalladka	1,927	1.35	▼3.31
RPI(A)	Lolaksha	1,511	1.06	New
KJP	Ibrahim Kailara	1,157	0.81	New
Margin of victory		17,850	2.50	▲1.57
Turnout		156,301	79.32	▲1.06
Total valid votes		142,808		
Registered electors		197,060		▲14.02
INC hold		Swing	▲11.67	

=== Assembly Election 2008 ===
2008 Karnataka Legislative Assembly election : Bantval
Party	Candidate	Votes	%	±%
INC	Ramanath Rai	61,560	45.52	▲0.73
BJP	B. Nagaraja Shetty	60,309	44.60	▼5.61
JD(S)	K. M. Ibrahim	6,298	4.66	▲2.73
CPI	Sathish Kumar Bantwal	3,127	2.31	New
Independent	Ramanatha Pai	2,544	1.88	New
BSP	P. A. Raheem	1,396	1.03	▼0.23
Margin of victory		1,251	0.93	▼4.49
Turnout		135,254	78.26	▲0.21
Total valid votes		135,234		
Registered electors		172,836		▲23.47
INC gain from BJP		Swing	▼4.69	

=== Assembly Election 2004 ===
2004 Karnataka Legislative Assembly election : Bantval
Party	Candidate	Votes	%	±%
BJP	B. Nagaraja Shetty	54,860	50.21	▲9.03
INC	Ramanath Rai	48,934	44.79	▼12.17
JD(S)	Madhava Kulal. B	2,113	1.93	▲0.40
BSP	Ramesh Bodhi. M	1,374	1.26	New
Kannada Nadu Party	Shivaprasad	1,180	1.08	New
JP	Krishnappa Poojary. T	795	0.73	New
Margin of victory		5,926	5.42	▼10.35
Turnout		109,256	78.05	▲3.03
Total valid votes		109,256		
Registered electors		139,984		▲17.52
BJP gain from INC		Swing	▼6.75	

=== Assembly Election 1999 ===
1999 Karnataka Legislative Assembly election : Bantval
Party	Candidate	Votes	%	±%
INC	Ramanath Rai	49,905	56.96	▲12.68
BJP	Shakunthala. T. Shetty	36,084	41.18	▲2.49
JD(S)	Flevy Dsouza	1,339	1.53	New
Margin of victory		13,821	15.77	▲10.18
Turnout		89,360	75.02	▲3.33
Total valid votes		87,617		
Rejected ballots		1,743	1.95	▲0.67
Registered electors		119,115		▲9.68
INC hold		Swing	▲12.68	

=== Assembly Election 1994 ===
1994 Karnataka Legislative Assembly election : Bantval
Party	Candidate	Votes	%	±%
INC	Ramanath Rai	34,027	44.28	▼4.08
BJP	Shakunthala. T. Shetty	29,734	38.69	▲13.74
INC	Vijaya Kumar Rai	7,393	9.62	New
JD	Abdul Rahiman	4,026	5.24	▼18.07
Independent	N. Shiva Rao	905	1.18	New
Margin of victory		4,293	5.59	▼17.82
Turnout		77,856	71.69	▲3.23
Total valid votes		76,851		
Rejected ballots		998	1.28	▼3.61
Registered electors		108,602		▲3.81
INC hold		Swing	▼4.08	

=== Assembly Election 1989 ===
1989 Karnataka Legislative Assembly election : Bantval
Party	Candidate	Votes	%	±%
INC	Ramanath Rai	32,939	48.36	▼1.60
BJP	H. Narayana Rai	16,995	24.95	▼9.81
JD	Abdul Rahiman	15,879	23.31	New
JP	John Noronha	2,304	3.38	New
Margin of victory		15,944	23.41	▲8.21
Turnout		71,618	68.46	▼1.08
Total valid votes		68,117		
Rejected ballots		3,501	4.89	▲3.90
Registered electors		104,616		▲36.61
INC hold		Swing	▼1.60	

=== Assembly Election 1985 ===
1985 Karnataka Legislative Assembly election : Bantval
Party	Candidate	Votes	%	±%
INC	Ramanath Rai	26,344	49.96	▲19.33
BJP	N. Shiva Rao	18,328	34.76	▼3.36
CPI	B. Vishwanath Naik	7,316	13.87	▼8.41
Independent	Sheikh Ibrahim Saheb	742	1.41	New
Margin of victory		8,016	15.20	▲7.72
Turnout		53,256	69.54	▲1.37
Total valid votes		52,730		
Rejected ballots		526	0.99	▼0.72
Registered electors		76,582		▲10.57
INC gain from BJP		Swing	▲11.84	

=== Assembly Election 1983 ===
1983 Karnataka Legislative Assembly election : Bantval
Party	Candidate	Votes	%	±%
BJP	N. Shiva Rao	17,690	38.12	New
INC	K. P. Abdulla	14,217	30.63	▲26.70
CPI	B. Vishwanath Naik	10,342	22.28	New
Independent	Sheikh Ibrahim Saheb	3,443	7.42	New
Independent	N. V. K. Bhatrakodi	717	1.54	New
Margin of victory		3,473	7.48	▼16.70
Turnout		47,216	68.17	▼10.01
Total valid votes		46,409		
Rejected ballots		807	1.71	▲0.19
Registered electors		69,264		▲4.13
BJP gain from INC(I)		Swing	▼22.00	

=== Assembly Election 1978 ===
1978 Karnataka Legislative Assembly election : Bantval
Party	Candidate	Votes	%	±%
INC(I)	B. A. Mohideen	30,790	60.12	New
JP	A. Rukmayya Poojari	18,409	35.95	New
INC	Mahabala Shetty	2,015	3.93	New
Margin of victory		12,381	24.18	▼13.85
Turnout		52,003	78.18	▲9.75
Total valid votes		51,214		
Rejected ballots		789	1.52	▲1.52
Registered electors		66,518		▼7.25
INC(I) gain from CPI		Swing	▼2.39	

=== Assembly Election 1972 ===
1972 Mysore State Legislative Assembly election : Bantval
Party	Candidate	Votes	%	±%
CPI	B. V. Kakkilaya	30,031	62.51	New
ABJS	A. Rukmayya Poojari	11,762	24.48	New
Independent	Sheikh Ibrahim Saheb	3,843	8.00	New
Independent	S. I. J. Moras	1,972	4.10	New
SSP	Ishwara Bhat Parpakaje	434	0.90	New
Margin of victory		18,269	38.03	▲16.33
Turnout		49,079	68.43	▼4.69
Total valid votes		48,042		
Registered electors		71,717		▲16.53
CPI gain from INC		Swing	▲15.31	

=== Assembly Election 1967 ===
1967 Mysore State Legislative Assembly election : Bantval
Party	Candidate	Votes	%	±%
INC	K. L. Rai	20,347	47.20	New
Independent	A. Somayaji	10,993	25.50	New
CPI(M)	M. H. Krishnappa	9,666	22.42	New
Independent	K. A. S. L. Bangera	2,101	4.87	New
Margin of victory		9,354	21.70	
Turnout		45,001	73.12	
Total valid votes		43,107		
Registered electors		61,546		
INC win (new seat)				

== See also ==
- List of constituencies of the Karnataka Legislative Assembly
- Dakshina Kannada district
