= Leader of the House in Rajya Sabha =

Caucus head of the majority party in the upper house of Indian parliament

Leader of the House of Rajya Sabha
- Rājya Sabhā ke Sadana Netā
- Rajya Sabha (Council of States)

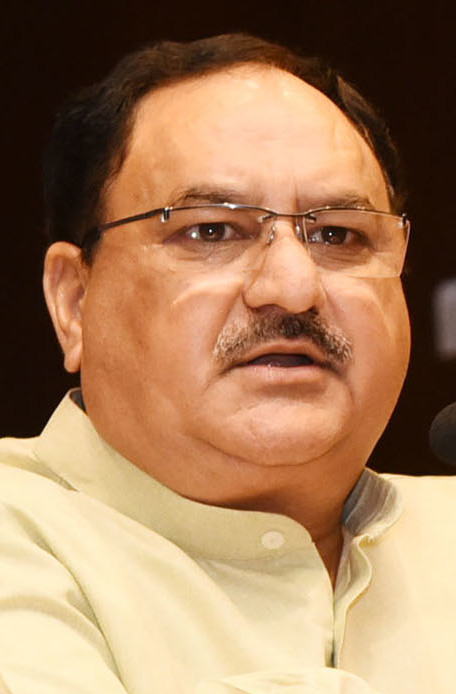
- Incumbent; Jagat Prakash Nadda since 24 June 2024
- Style: The Honourable
- Type: Parliamentary Leader
- Status: Parliamentary Chairman of the Majority Party
- Abbreviation: LoH
- Member of: Rajya Sabha
- Reports to: Parliament of India
- Residence: 8, Teen Murti Marg, New Delhi
- Seat: Sansad Bhavan, New Delhi
- Nominator: MPs of the majority Parliamentary Party or alliance in the Council of States
- Appointer: Chairman of the Rajya Sabha by convention, based on appointee's ability to command confidence in the Rajya Sabha
- Term length: At the pleasure of the president or confidence of parliamentary party in Lok Sabha; 5 years unless dissolved sooner (No term limits specified)
- Formation: May 1952
- First holder: N. Gopalaswami Ayyangar (1952)
- Deputy: Deputy Leader of House
- Salary: ₹330,000 (US$3,400) (excl. allowances) per month

The Leader of the House in Rajya Sabha (IAST: Rājya Sabhā ke Sadana Netā) is the leader and parliamentary chairperson of the majority party in the Rajya Sabha and is normally either a cabinet minister or another nominated minister. The Leader of the House is responsible for organising government meetings and business in the House. This office is not enshrined in the constitution and provided under the Rules of Rajya Sabha (Council of States).

== List of Leader of the House in the Rajya Sabha ==
The following individuals have held the office of the Leader of the House in the Rajya Sabha:

Key

- ^{†} Assassinated or died in office

No.	Portrait	Name (born – died) Constituency	Term of office		Ministerial offices held	Political party	Government	Prime Minister	Chairman (Tenure)
1		N. Gopalaswamy Ayyangar (1882–1953); MP for Tamil Nadu	13 May 1952	10 February 1953^{[†]}	Minister of Defence	Indian National Congress	Nehru II	Jawaharlal Nehru	Sarvepalli Radhakrishnan (1952–1962)
2		Charu Chandra Biswas (1888–1960); MP for West Bengal	February; 1953	November; 1954	Minister of Law and Justice	Indian National Congress	Nehru II	Jawaharlal Nehru	Sarvepalli Radhakrishnan (1952–1962)
3		Lal Bahadur Shastri (1904–1966); MP for Uttar Pradesh	November; 1954	March; 1955	Minister of Railways	Indian National Congress	Nehru II	Jawaharlal Nehru	Sarvepalli Radhakrishnan (1952–1962)
4		Govind Ballabh Pant (1887–1961); MP for Uttar Pradesh	March; 1955	March; 1961^{[†]}	Minister of Home Affairs	Indian National Congress	Nehru II	Jawaharlal Nehru	Sarvepalli Radhakrishnan (1952–1962)
4		Govind Ballabh Pant (1887–1961); MP for Uttar Pradesh	March; 1955	March; 1961^{[†]}	Minister of Home Affairs	Indian National Congress	Nehru III	Jawaharlal Nehru	Sarvepalli Radhakrishnan (1952–1962)
5		Hafiz Mohamad Ibrahim (1889–1968); MP for Uttar Pradesh	March; 1961	August; 1963	Minister of Irrigation and Power	Indian National Congress	Nehru III	Jawaharlal Nehru	Sarvepalli Radhakrishnan (1952–1962)
5		Hafiz Mohamad Ibrahim (1889–1968); MP for Uttar Pradesh	March; 1961	August; 1963	Minister of Irrigation and Power	Indian National Congress	Nehru IV	Jawaharlal Nehru	Zakir Husain (1962–1967)
6		Yashwantrao Chavan (1913–1984); MP for Maharashtra	August; 1963	December; 1963	Minister of Defence	Indian National Congress	Nehru IV	Jawaharlal Nehru	Zakir Husain (1962–1967)
7		Jaisukhlal Hathi (1909–1982); MP for Gujarat	February; 1964	March; 1964	Minister of State for Home Affairs; Minister of State for Labour	Indian National Congress	Nehru IV	Jawaharlal Nehru	Zakir Husain (1962–1967)
8		M. C. Chagla (1900–1981); MP for Maharashtra	March; 1964	November; 1967	Minister of Education (1963–1966); Minister of External Affairs (1966–1967)	Indian National Congress	Nehru IV	Jawaharlal Nehru	Zakir Husain (1962–1967)
8		M. C. Chagla (1900–1981); MP for Maharashtra	March; 1964	November; 1967	Minister of Education (1963–1966); Minister of External Affairs (1966–1967)	Indian National Congress	Nanda I	Gulzarilal Nanda	Zakir Husain (1962–1967)
8		M. C. Chagla (1900–1981); MP for Maharashtra	March; 1964	November; 1967	Minister of Education (1963–1966); Minister of External Affairs (1966–1967)	Indian National Congress	Shastri	Lal Bahadur Shastri	Zakir Husain (1962–1967)
8		M. C. Chagla (1900–1981); MP for Maharashtra	March; 1964	November; 1967	Minister of Education (1963–1966); Minister of External Affairs (1966–1967)	Indian National Congress	Nanda II	Gulzarilal Nanda	Zakir Husain (1962–1967)
8		M. C. Chagla (1900–1981); MP for Maharashtra	March; 1964	November; 1967	Minister of Education (1963–1966); Minister of External Affairs (1966–1967)	Indian National Congress	Indira I	Indira Gandhi	V. V. Giri (1967–1969)
8		M. C. Chagla (1900–1981); MP for Maharashtra	March; 1964	November; 1967	Minister of Education (1963–1966); Minister of External Affairs (1966–1967)	Indian National Congress	Indira II	Indira Gandhi	V. V. Giri (1967–1969)
(7)		Jaisukhlal Hathi (1909–1982); MP for Gujarat	November; 1967	November; 1969	Minister of Labour, Employment and Rehabilition	Indian National Congress	Indira II	Indira Gandhi	V. V. Giri (1967–1969)
(7)		Jaisukhlal Hathi (1909–1982); MP for Gujarat	November; 1967	November; 1969	Minister of Labour, Employment and Rehabilition	Indian National Congress	Indira II	Indira Gandhi	Gopal Swarup Pathak (1969–1974)
9		Kodardas Kalidas Shah (1908–1986); MP for Gujarat	November; 1969	May; 1971	Minister of Health, Family Planning and Urban Development	Indian National Congress	Indira II	Indira Gandhi	Gopal Swarup Pathak (1969–1974)
9		Kodardas Kalidas Shah (1908–1986); MP for Gujarat	November; 1969	May; 1971	Minister of Health, Family Planning and Urban Development	Indian National Congress	Indira III	Indira Gandhi	Gopal Swarup Pathak (1969–1974)
10		Uma Shankar Dikshit (1901–1991); MP for Uttar Pradesh	May; 1971	December; 1975	Minister of Health, Family Planning and Urban Development (1971–1973); Minister of Home Affairs (1974–1975); Minister of Shipping and Transport (1975)	Indian National Congress	Indira III	Indira Gandhi	Gopal Swarup Pathak (1969–1974)
10		Uma Shankar Dikshit (1901–1991); MP for Uttar Pradesh	May; 1971	December; 1975	Minister of Health, Family Planning and Urban Development (1971–1973); Minister of Home Affairs (1974–1975); Minister of Shipping and Transport (1975)	Indian National Congress	Indira III	Indira Gandhi	B. D. Jatti (1974–1979)
11		Kamalapati Tripathi (1905–1990); MP for Uttar Pradesh	December; 1975	March; 1977	Minister of Railways	Indian National Congress	Indira III	Indira Gandhi	B. D. Jatti (1974–1979)
12		Lal Krishna Advani (born 1927); MP for Gujarat	March; 1977	August; 1979	Minister of Information and Broadcasting	Janata Party	Desai	Morarji Desai	B. D. Jatti (1974–1979)
12		Lal Krishna Advani (born 1927); MP for Gujarat	March; 1977	August; 1979	Minister of Information and Broadcasting	Janata Party	Charan	Charan Singh	B. D. Jatti (1974–1979)
13		Krishna Chandra Pant (1931–2012); MP for Uttar Pradesh	August; 1979	January; 1980	Minister of Energy	Indian National Congress (Urs)	Charan	Charan Singh	Mohammad Hidayatullah (1979–1984)
14		Pranab Mukherjee (1935–2018); MP for West Bengal (until 1981); MP for Gujarat (from 1981)	January; 1980	10 July 1981	Minister of Commerce and Industry (1980–1982); Minister of Finance (1982–1984)	Indian National Congress	Indira IV	Indira Gandhi	Mohammad Hidayatullah (1979–1984)
14		Pranab Mukherjee (1935–2018); MP for West Bengal (until 1981); MP for Gujarat (from 1981)	14 August 1981	December; 1984	Minister of Commerce and Industry (1980–1982); Minister of Finance (1982–1984)	Indian National Congress	Indira IV	Indira Gandhi	Mohammad Hidayatullah (1979–1984)
14		Pranab Mukherjee (1935–2018); MP for West Bengal (until 1981); MP for Gujarat (from 1981)	14 August 1981	December; 1984	Minister of Commerce and Industry (1980–1982); Minister of Finance (1982–1984)	Indian National Congress	Indira IV	Indira Gandhi	Ramaswamy Venkataraman (1984–1987)
15		Vishwanath Pratap Singh (1931–2008); MP for Uttar Pradesh	December; 1984	April; 1987	Minister of Finance (1984–1987); Minister of Defence (1987)	Indian National Congress	Rajiv I & II	Rajiv Gandhi	Ramaswamy Venkataraman (1984–1987)
16		Narayan Dutt Tiwari (1925–2018); MP for Uttar Pradesh	April; 1987	June; 1988	Minister of Finance	Indian National Congress	Rajiv I & II	Rajiv Gandhi	
16		Narayan Dutt Tiwari (1925–2018); MP for Uttar Pradesh	April; 1987	June; 1988	Minister of Finance	Indian National Congress	Rajiv I & II	Rajiv Gandhi	Shankar Dayal Sharma (1987–1992)
17		P. Shiv Shankar (1929–2017); MP for Gujarat	June; 1988	December; 1989	Minister of Human Resource Development	Indian National Congress	Rajiv I & II	Rajiv Gandhi	Shankar Dayal Sharma (1987–1992)
18		M. S. Gurupadaswamy (1924–2011); MP for Karnataka	December; 1989	November; 1990	Minister of Petroleum and Chemicals	Janata Dal	V. P. Singh	V. P. Singh	Shankar Dayal Sharma (1987–1992)
19		Yashwant Sinha (born 1937); MP for Bihar	November; 1990	June; 1991	Minister of Finance	Samajwadi Janata Party (Rashtriya)	Chandra Shekhar	Chandra Shekhar	Shankar Dayal Sharma (1987–1992)
20		Shankarrao Chavan (1920–2004); MP for Maharashtra	July; 1991	April; 1996	Minister of Home Affairs	Indian National Congress	Rao	P. V. Narasimha Rao	Shankar Dayal Sharma (1987–1992)
20		Shankarrao Chavan (1920–2004); MP for Maharashtra	July; 1991	April; 1996	Minister of Home Affairs	Indian National Congress	Rao	P. V. Narasimha Rao	K. R. Narayanan (1992–1997)
21		Sikander Bakht (1918–2004); MP for Madhya Pradesh	May; 1996	June; 1996	Minister of External Affairs; Minister of Urban Affairs and Employment	Bharatiya Janata Party	Vajpayee I	Atal Bihari Vajpayee	K. R. Narayanan (1992–1997)
22		Inder Kumar Gujral (1919–2012); MP for Bihar	June; 1996	November; 1996	Minister of External Affairs	Janata Dal	Deve Gowda	H. D. Deve Gowda	K. R. Narayanan (1992–1997)
23		H. D. Deve Gowda (born 1933); MP for Karnataka	November; 1996	April; 1997	Prime Minister; Minister of Urban Development	Janata Dal	Deve Gowda	Self	K. R. Narayanan (1992–1997)
(22)		Inder Kumar Gujral (1919–2012); MP for Bihar	April; 1997	March; 1998	Prime Minister; Minister of External Affairs	Janata Dal	Gujral	Inder Kumar Gujral	
(22)		Inder Kumar Gujral (1919–2012); MP for Bihar	April; 1997	March; 1998	Prime Minister; Minister of External Affairs	Janata Dal	Gujral	Inder Kumar Gujral	Krishan Kant (1997–2002)
(21)		Sikander Bakht (1918–2004); MP for Madhya Pradesh	19 March 1998	13 October 1999	Minister of Industry	Bharatiya Janata Party	Vajpayee II	Atal Bihari Vajpayee	Krishan Kant (1997–2002)
24		Jaswant Singh (1938–2020); MP for Rajasthan	13 October 1999	22 May 2004	Minister of External Affairs (1999–2002); Minister of Finance (2002–2004)	Bharatiya Janata Party	Vajpayee III	Atal Bihari Vajpayee	Krishan Kant (1997–2002)
24		Jaswant Singh (1938–2020); MP for Rajasthan	13 October 1999	22 May 2004	Minister of External Affairs (1999–2002); Minister of Finance (2002–2004)	Bharatiya Janata Party	Vajpayee III	Atal Bihari Vajpayee	Bhairon Singh Shekhawat (2002–2007)
25		Manmohan Singh (1932–2024); MP for Assam(Prime Minister)	22 May 2004	26 May 2014	Prime Minister; Minister of Personnel, Public Grievances and Pensions; Minister of External Affairs (2005–2006); Minister of Finance (2008–2009, 2012)	Indian National Congress	Manmohan I	Self	Bhairon Singh Shekhawat (2002–2007)
25		Manmohan Singh (1932–2024); MP for Assam(Prime Minister)	22 May 2004	26 May 2014	Prime Minister; Minister of Personnel, Public Grievances and Pensions; Minister of External Affairs (2005–2006); Minister of Finance (2008–2009, 2012)	Indian National Congress	Manmohan II	Self	Mohammad Hamid Ansari (2007–2017)
26		Arun Jaitley (1952–2019); MP for Gujarat (till 2018); MP for Uttar Pradesh (from 2018)	26 May 2014	2 April 2018	Minister of Finance and Corporate Affairs; Minister of Defence (2014, 2017); Minister of Information and Broadcasting (2014–2016)	Bharatiya Janata Party	Modi I	Narendra Modi	Mohammad Hamid Ansari (2007–2017)
26		Arun Jaitley (1952–2019); MP for Gujarat (till 2018); MP for Uttar Pradesh (from 2018)	3 April 2018	11 June 2019	Minister of Finance and Corporate Affairs; Minister of Defence (2014, 2017); Minister of Information and Broadcasting (2014–2016)	Bharatiya Janata Party	Modi I	Narendra Modi	M. Venkaiah Naidu (2017–2022)
27		Thawar Chand Gehlot (born 1948); MP for Madhya Pradesh	11 June 2019	6 July 2021	Minister of Social Justice and Empowerment	Bharatiya Janata Party	Modi II	Narendra Modi	M. Venkaiah Naidu (2017–2022)
28		Piyush Goyal (born 1964); MP for Maharashtra	14 July 2021	4 June 2024	Minister of Commerce and Industry; Minister of Consumer Affairs, Food and Public Distribution; Minister of Textiles	Bharatiya Janata Party	Modi II	Narendra Modi	M. Venkaiah Naidu (2017–2022)
28		Piyush Goyal (born 1964); MP for Maharashtra	14 July 2021	4 June 2024	Minister of Commerce and Industry; Minister of Consumer Affairs, Food and Public Distribution; Minister of Textiles	Bharatiya Janata Party	Modi II	Narendra Modi	Jagdeep Dhankhar (2022–2025)
29		J. P. Nadda (born 1960); MP for Gujarat	24 June 2024	Incumbent	Minister of Health and Family Welfare; Minister of Chemicals and Fertilizers	Bharatiya Janata Party	Modi III	Narendra Modi	Jagdeep Dhankhar (2022–2025)
29		J. P. Nadda (born 1960); MP for Gujarat	24 June 2024	Incumbent	Minister of Health and Family Welfare; Minister of Chemicals and Fertilizers	Bharatiya Janata Party	Modi III	Narendra Modi	C.P. Radhakrishnan (2025- Incumbent)

=== Deputy Leader of the House in Rajya Sabha ===
The Deputy Leader of the House in Rajya Sabha (IAST: Rājya Sabhā ke Upar Sadana Netā) is the deputy leader and parliamentary chairperson of the majority party in the Rajya Sabha and is normally either a second senior cabinet minister.

Name (born – died) Constituency	Term of office		Ministerial offices held	Political party
Shivraj Patil (1935–2025); MP for Maharashtra	23 May 2004	30 November 2008	Minister of Home Affairs	Indian National Congress
Arackaparambil Kurien Antony (born 1940); MP for Kerala	30 November 2008	22 May 2009	Minister of Defence	Indian National Congress
Ghulam Nabi Azad (born 1949); MP for J&K	28 May 2009	26 May 2014	Ministry of Health and Family Welfare; Minister of Water Resources	Indian National Congress
Manohar Parrikar (1955–2019); MP for Uttar Pradesh	9 June 2014	13 March 2017	Minister of Defence	Bharatiya Janata Party
Ravi Shankar Prasad (born 1954); MP for Bihar	13 March 2017	30 May 2019	Minister of Law and Justice; Ministry of Electronics and Information Technology; Minister of Communications	Bharatiya Janata Party
Piyush Goyal (born 1964); MP for Maharashtra	12 June 2019	13 July 2021	Minister of Commerce and Industry; Minister of Consumer Affairs, Food and Public Distribution; Minister of Railways	Bharatiya Janata Party
Mukhtar Abbas Naqvi (born 1957); MP for Jharkhand	19 July 2021	1 October 2022	Minister of Minority Affairs	Bharatiya Janata Party

== See also ==
- Vice President of India (Chairperson of the Rajya Sabha)
- Deputy Chairperson of the Rajya Sabha
- Leader of the House in Lok Sabha
- Leader of the Opposition in Rajya Sabha
- Leader of the Opposition in Lok Sabha
- Secretary General of the Rajya Sabha
