= Vittal Assembly constituency =

Former Assembly constituency in Karnataka, India

Coordinates: 12.76°N 75.10°E

Vittal
- Former constituency for the Karnataka Legislative Assembly

Constituency details
- Country: India
- Region: South India
- State: Karnataka
- District: Dakshina Kannada
- Lok Sabha constituency: Mangalore
- Established: 1977
- Abolished: 2008
- Reservation: None

Vittal Assembly constituency was a constituency of the Karnataka Legislative Assembly, which ceased to exist after 2008. It came under Mangalore Lok Sabha constituency, Karnataka, India.

== Members of the Legislative Assembly ==
Election	Member	Party
1978	B. V. Kakkilaya	Communist Party of India
1983	A. Rukmayya Poojari	Bharatiya Janata Party
1985	B. A. Ummarabba	Indian National Congress
1989	A. Rukmayya Poojari	Bharatiya Janata Party
1994	A. Rukmayya Poojari	Bharatiya Janata Party
1999	K. M. Ibrahim	Indian National Congress
2004	Padmanabha Kottari	Bharatiya Janata Party

== Election results ==
=== Assembly Election 2004 ===
2004 Karnataka Legislative Assembly election : Vittal
Party	Candidate	Votes	%	±%
BJP	Padmanabha Kottari	60,250	48.01%	▼0.15
INC	K. M. Ibrahim	59,859	47.70%	▼2.47
JD(S)	Radhakrishna Rai. B	2,348	1.87%	New
Kannada Nadu Party	Damodara Poojari. N	1,435	1.14%	New
JP	Keshava Naik. P	1,095	0.87%	New
Margin of victory		391	0.31%	▼1.70
Turnout		125,594	78.22%	▲0.65
Total valid votes		125,483		
Registered electors		160,564		▲13.28
BJP gain from INC		Swing	▼2.16	

=== Assembly Election 1999 ===
1999 Karnataka Legislative Assembly election : Vittal
Party	Candidate	Votes	%	±%
INC	K. M. Ibrahim	54,268	50.17%	▲30.97
BJP	A. Rukmayya Poojari	52,093	48.16%	▲4.69
Independent	K. M. Prabhadevi	1,332	1.23%	New
Margin of victory		2,175	2.01%	▼5.42
Turnout		109,944	77.57%	▲2.73
Total valid votes		108,177		
Rejected ballots		1,767	1.61%	▲0.67
Registered electors		141,741		▲9.68
INC gain from BJP		Swing	▲6.70	

=== Assembly Election 1994 ===
1994 Karnataka Legislative Assembly election : Vittal
Party	Candidate	Votes	%	±%
BJP	A. Rukmayya Poojari	41,627	43.47%	▲11.48
JD	H. Ramayya Naik	34,507	36.03%	▲13.67
INC	V. K. Abdul Khader	18,387	19.20%	▼5.12
INC	Basheer Baikampady	1,082	1.13%	New
Margin of victory		7,120	7.43%	▼0.25
Turnout		96,716	74.84%	▲0.43
Total valid votes		95,766		
Rejected ballots		909	0.94%	▼3.50
Registered electors		129,233		▲5.58
BJP hold		Swing	▲11.48	

=== Assembly Election 1989 ===
1989 Karnataka Legislative Assembly election : Vittal
Party	Candidate	Votes	%	±%
BJP	A. Rukmayya Poojari	27,846	31.99%	▼2.41
INC	K. P. Abdulla	21,164	24.32%	▼21.13
JD	H. Ramayya Naik	19,465	22.36%	New
Independent	B. A. Ummarabba	15,577	17.90%	New
CPI	P. Vittala Bangera	2,987	3.43%	New
Margin of victory		6,682	7.68%	▼3.37
Turnout		91,082	74.41%	▲1.93
Total valid votes		87,039		
Rejected ballots		4,043	4.44%	▲3.65
Registered electors		122,399		▲28.96
BJP gain from INC		Swing	▼13.46	

=== Assembly Election 1985 ===
1985 Karnataka Legislative Assembly election : Vittal
Party	Candidate	Votes	%	±%
INC	B. A. Ummarabba	31,017	45.45%	▲20.31
BJP	A. Rukmayya Poojari	23,478	34.40%	▼3.50
JP	Hashim Schamnad	13,093	19.18%	New
Independent	Y. Narayana Bhat	545	0.80%	New
Margin of victory		7,539	11.05%	▼1.71
Turnout		68,792	72.48%	▼0.51
Total valid votes		68,248		
Rejected ballots		544	0.79%	▼0.52
Registered electors		94,909		▲16.30
INC gain from BJP		Swing	▲7.55	

=== Assembly Election 1983 ===
1983 Karnataka Legislative Assembly election : Vittal
Party	Candidate	Votes	%	±%
BJP	A. Rukmayya Poojari	22,277	37.90%	New
INC	B. Shivarama Shetty	14,779	25.14%	▲24.17
Independent	C. Abdul Hameed	13,080	22.25%	New
CPI	B. V. Kakkilaya	7,160	12.18%	▼39.71
Independent	Thukrappa Mere	1,398	2.38%	New
Margin of victory		7,498	12.76%	▼4.28
Turnout		59,565	72.99%	▼5.92
Total valid votes		58,784		
Rejected ballots		781	1.31%	▼0.06
Registered electors		81,606		▲6.21
BJP gain from CPI		Swing	▼13.99	

=== Assembly Election 1978 ===
1978 Karnataka Legislative Assembly election : Vittal
Party	Candidate	Votes	%	±%
CPI	B. V. Kakkilaya	31,030	51.89%	New
JP	B. A. Ummarabba	20,838	34.85%	New
CPI(M)	M. H. Krishnappa	4,353	7.28%	New
Independent	C. Abdul Hameed	2,994	5.01%	New
INC	Deranna Pandith. K. P	583	0.97%	New
Margin of victory		10,192	17.04%	
Turnout		60,631	78.91%	
Total valid votes		59,798		
Rejected ballots		833	1.37%	
Registered electors		76,831		
CPI win (new seat)				
