= Ramanath Rai =

Indian politician

B. Ramanath Rai
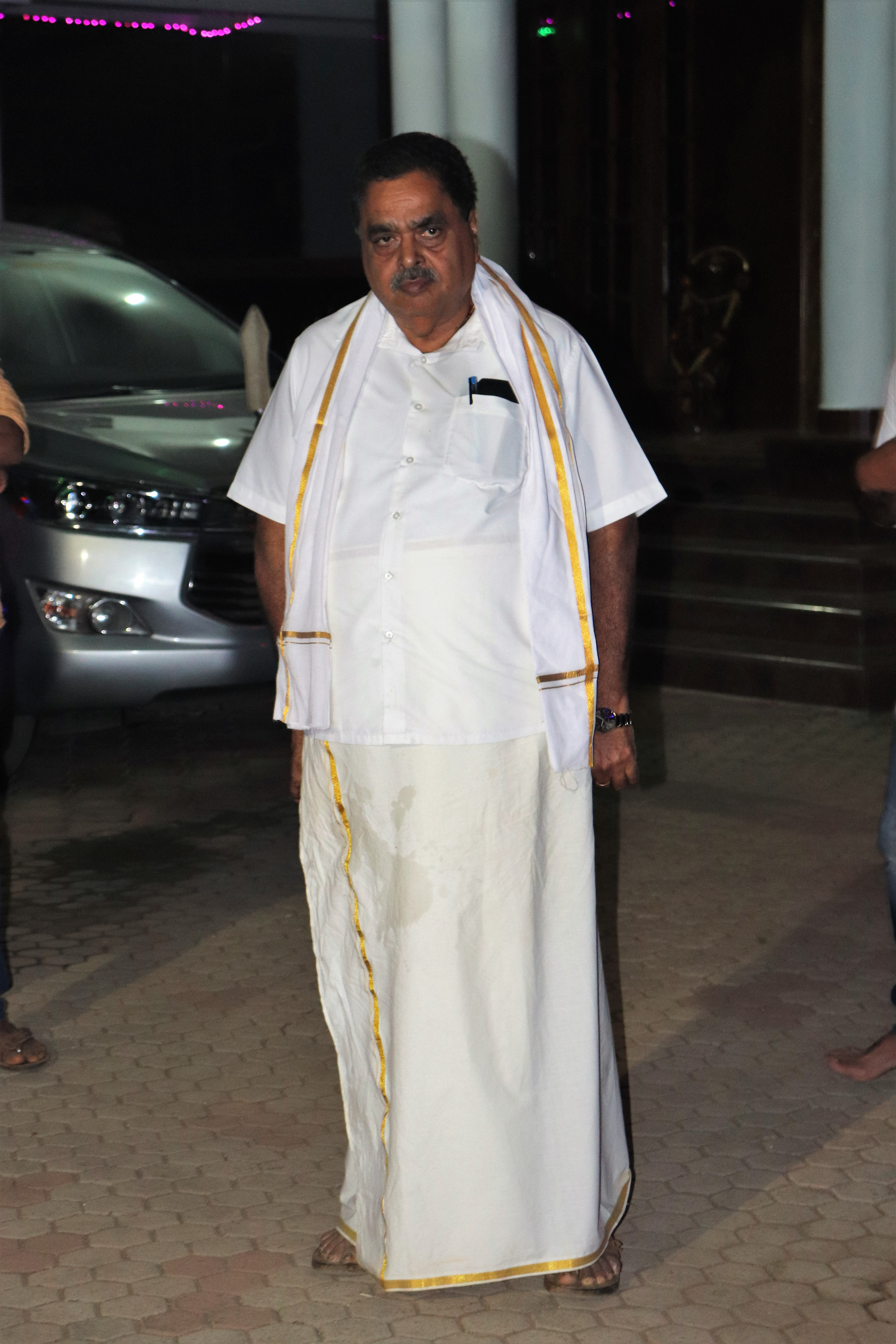
- B. Ramanath Rai during a public event

Minister of Forest, Environment and Ecology of Karnataka
- In office 20 May 2013 – 15 May 2018
- Governor: Vajubhai Vala
- Succeeded by: R. Shankar

Member of the Legislative Assembly
- In office 1985–2004
- Preceded by: N. Shiva Rao
- Succeeded by: B. Nagaraja Shetty
- Constituency: Bantwal
- In office 25 May 2008 – 15 May 2018
- Preceded by: B. Nagaraja Shetty
- Succeeded by: U. Rajesh Naik

Personal details
- Born: Bellipady Ramanath Rai; 13 September 1952 (age 74) Perne, Mysore State, India
- Party: Indian National Congress
- Spouse: Shrimathi Dhanabagya Ramanath Rai
- Children: Charishma R. Rai (daughter), Chaithradeep R. Rai (son)
- Education: Mangalore University
- Occupation: Politician
- Known for: Public welfare and cooperative initiatives

B Ramanath Rai (born 13 September 1952) is an Indian politician affiliated with the Indian National Congress (INC). He is a six-time member of the Karnataka Legislative Assembly, having represented the Bantwal constituency in the years 1985, 1989, 1994, 1999, 2008, and 2013.

Over his political career, Rai has contested nine elections under the Congress Party symbol, winning six of them and serving Karnataka for over 30 years.

Rai has held multiple ministerial portfolios in the Government of Karnataka, including:

- Minister of State for Home (Prisons, Fire Force, and Home Guards) and Excise (1992–1994): Under Chief Minister M. Veerappa Moily, Rai focused on modernising prison facilities and enhancing fire safety measures across the state.
- Cabinet Minister for Transport, Ports, and Fisheries and Dakshina Kannada District In-charge (1999–2004): In the cabinet of Chief Minister S. M. Krishna, Rai worked on improving transportation infrastructure and fostering sustainable development of Karnataka's ports and fisheries.
- Minister for Forest, Ecology, and Environment and Dakshina Kannada District In-charge (2013–2018): As part of Chief Minister Siddaramaiah's government, Rai implemented environmental conservation policies and developmental programs to uplift marginalised communities.

With the trust of the Congress Party high command, Rai has been instrumental in implementing numerous welfare initiatives, focusing on the upliftment of the poor, downtrodden, and women.

== Early life and education ==
Ramanath Rai was born on 13 September 1952 in Perne, a village in the Dakshina Kannada district of Karnataka (then part of Mysore State). He belongs to the Bunt community. Rai holds a Bachelor of Arts (B.A.) degree from Mangalore University.

== Political career ==
B. Ramanath Rai began his political journey with the Indian National Congress (INC) and was first elected to the Karnataka Legislative Assembly in 1985, representing the Bantwal constituency. Over a political career spanning more than three decades, he has contested nine elections and emerged victorious six times, earning a reputation as a stalwart leader in Karnataka politics.

=== Ministerial roles ===
Rai has held several key ministerial portfolios during his tenure:

1. Minister of State for Home (Prisons, Fire Force, and Home Guards) and Excise (1993–1996): Appointed in the cabinet of Chief Minister M. Veerappa Moily, he focused on modernizing prison facilities and enhancing fire safety measures across Karnataka.

2. Cabinet Minister for Transport, Ports, and Fisheries (1999–2004): Under the leadership of Chief Minister S. M. Krishna, Rai worked to improve Karnataka's transport infrastructure and promote sustainable development of ports and fisheries.

3. Minister for Forest, Environment, and Ecology (2013–2018): Serving in Chief Minister Siddaramaiah's cabinet, he implemented significant environmental conservation policies and addressed ecological challenges in the state.

Throughout his ministerial career, Rai has been recognized for his commitment to inclusive development, particularly initiatives benefiting rural communities, women, and the underprivileged. His leadership in Dakshina Kannada District as its In-charge Minister has been credited with fostering regional growth and maintaining communal harmony.

== Contributions to the Congress Party ==
Rai has held significant positions within the INC and its affiliate organisations:

- Founder of the Mangalore University College Students' Union.
- Organiser of the National Students' Union of India (NSUI) in Dakshina Kannada District.
- President of the Bantwal Taluk Youth Congress Committee and District Youth Congress Committee for over a decade.
- District Congress Committee (DCC) President of Dakshina Kannada (2004–2014), where he led the Congress to win seven out of eight seats in the 2013 Karnataka Assembly elections.
- Vice president of the Karnataka Pradesh Congress Committee (KPCC) since 2022.
- Member of the All India Congress Committee (AICC) as of 2024.

== Cooperative movement ==
Rai has been a staunch advocate of cooperative institutions. He served as:

- President of the Bantwal Taluk Land Development Co-operative Bank (1978–1984).
- President of the Bantwal Credit Co-operative Society.

== Personal life ==
Rai resides in "Shrishaila," Kallige House, in his home constituency of Bantwal. He is married to Shrimathi Dhanabagya Ramanath Rai and has two children, Charishma R. Rai and Chaithradeep R. Rai.

== Retirement ==
In May 2023, Rai announced his retirement from electoral politics, emphasizing his desire to focus on mentoring younger political leaders and strengthening the party at the grassroots level.
