= B. Nagaraja Shetty =

Indian politician

B. Nagaraja Shetty (born 1957) is an Indian politician who has been a minister in the Government of Karnataka.

== Biography ==
Shetty joined the Bharatiya Janata Party and in 2004 was elected to the Karnataka Legislative Assembly from the Bantwal constituency. He had defeated Congress veteran B. Ramanath Rai who was representing the constituency since 1985. During this term he was also a minister who held various portfolios. He was the Chairman of the Coastal Development Authority of Karnataka. He tendered his resignation from the authority on 14 July 2012 after he was not inducted into the newly formed state government cabinet.
