= U. Rajesh Naik =

Indian politician and legislator in Karnataka

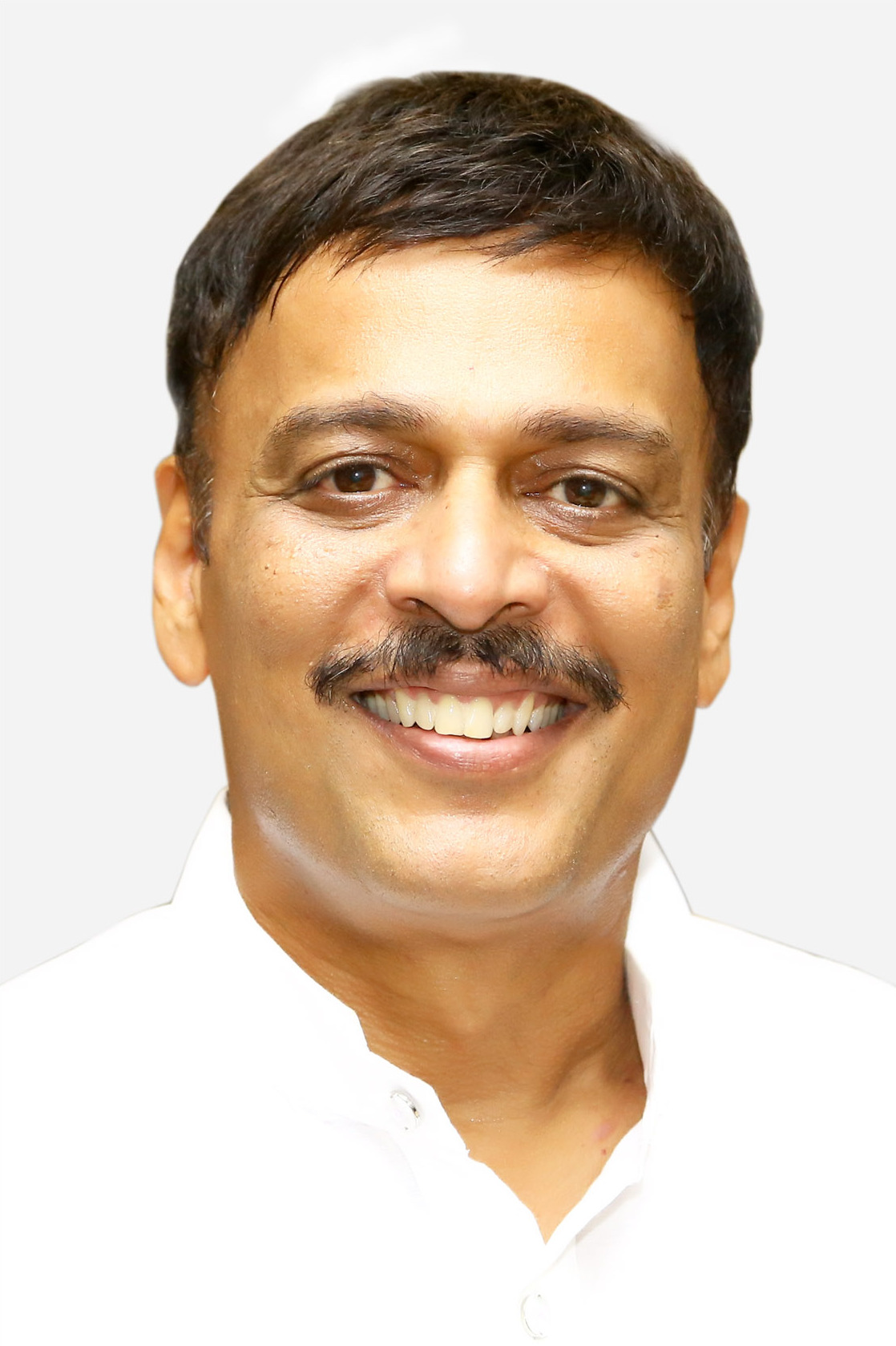
- Ulipady Rajesh Naik

Member of the Karnataka Legislative Assembly for Bantwal
- Incumbent
- Assumed office May 2018
- Preceded by: Ramanath Rai

Personal details
- Born: 11 July 1958 (age 67) Ulipady Guthu, Dakshina Kannada, Karnataka
- Party: Bharatiya Janata Party

Ulipady Rajesh Naik is a politician from Bantwal Karnataka. He is the Member of Legislative Assembly from Bantwal (Vidhana Sabha constituency) since May 2018 after he defeated Indian National Congress's candidate Ramanath Rai by 15,971 votes contesting the 2018 Karnataka Legislative Assembly election on a Bharatiya Janata Party ticket.

Rajesh Naik had previously lost to Ramanath Rai in 2013 Karnataka Legislative Assembly election.

Rajesh Naik is also a dairy farmer at his Oddoor farms in Thenka Yedapadavu village.
