= Tripura Ganatantrik Sangha =

Indian political party

The Tripura Rajya Ganatantrik Sangha ('Tripura State Democratic Union'), often referred to as Tripura Ganatantrik Sangha (abbreviated TGS) was a political party in the Indian state of Tripura in the 1950s. The party was an allied organization of the Communist Party of India in the 1952 and 1957 elections, and held a seat in the Rajya Sabha (the upper house of the parliament of India) 1952 to 1954.

== Launch of TGS ==
The program of TGS was announced as a public meeting on February 25, 1951. The demands raised by TGS were the institution of a Legislative Assembly for Tripura, withdrawal of armed forces from the state, democratic conditions and civil rights. The president of TGS was Nibaran Chandra Ghosh and its general secretary Jitendra Chandra Paul. At the time of the formation of TGS the Communist Party of India (CPI) had given up the B.T. Ranadive line of armed struggle. Using TGS as a platform, the communists could raise democratic demands.

The launch of TGS was lauded in a communique issued by the Ganamukti Parishad (GMP, the tribal mass organization of CPI, which had conducted armed struggle in Tripura), expressing hope for mutual cooperation in struggles. The GMP communique was followed by an editorial in the CPI organ Tripuraer Katha which hailed the GMP communique as a move to establish links between the rural and urban exploited masses (with TGS representing the latter). The Tripuraer Katha editorial expressed that CPI fully supported the formation and program of TGS, and wished success to the complimentary roles of TGS and GMP.

== 1952 elections ==
On November 15, 1951 a United Front coalition was formed by CPI, TGS, GMP, Ganatantrik Nari Samiti and independents to contest the 1952 Tripura Electoral College election, on basis of a three-point program: to defeat the Congress Party, to restore democratic rights, and to establish of a responsible people's government in the state. TGS fielded candidates in five out of 30 constituencies. One TGS candidate - Birchandra Debbarma in Takarjala constituency - was elected unopposed. Two other TGS candidates were elected; Nandalal Chakraborty in Agartala Town II constituency, and Manindra Kishore Choudhry in Salgarh constituency. The five TGS candidates obtained 6,221 votes. After the election the Tripura Electoral College majority elected TGS leader Arman Ali Munshi to the Rajya Sabha.

== 1957 elections ==
TGS gained recognition from the Election Commission of India as a State Party in Tripura. Its election symbol was a ladder. The party contested the 1957 Tripura Territorial Council election with support from CPI, where they won a single seat in the Tripura Territorial Council. TGS lost its recognition as a State Party after the 1957 elections.
