= Lakhanpal =

Lakhanpal is an Indian surname. Notable people with the surname include:

- Chandravati Lakhanpal (1904–1969), Indian politician
- Rajendra Nath Lakhanpal (1923–2012), Indian paleobotanist
- Raghav Lakhanpal (fl. 2000), Member of Parliament, Saharanpur
