= Indra Vidyavachaspati =

Indian politician (8 November 1889 – 14 August 1960)

Member of Parliament, Rajya Sabha
- In office 1952–1958
- Constituency: Uttar Pradesh

Personal details
- Born: 8 November 1889
- Died: 24 August 1960 (aged 70)
- Party: Indian National Congress
- Spouse: Chandravati

Indra Vidyavachaspati (1889–1960) was an Indian politician. He was a Member of Parliament, representing Uttar Pradesh in the Rajya Sabha the upper house of India's Parliament as a member of the Indian National Congress
