= Tripura Rajya Muslim Praja Majlish =

Tripura Rajya Muslim Praja Majlish was Muslim political party in Tripura, India, formed around 1946. The party competed with Anjuman Islamia over the political influence over the Muslim community, but failed to make any lasting impact.

== See also ==
Politics of Tripura
