= Chandragopal Misra =

Indian politician

Member of Parliament, Rajya Sabha
- In office 1952–1954
- Constituency: Madhya Pradesh

Personal details
- Born: April 1876
- Died: 18 November 1957 (aged 80–81)
- Party: Kisan Majdoor Praja Party

Chandragopal Gajadhar Misra (1876–1957) was an Indian politician. He was a Member of Parliament, representing Madhya Pradesh in the Rajya Sabha the upper house of India's Parliament as a member of the Kisan Majdoor Praja Party.
