= Abdul Latif (Indian politician) =

Indian politician (1912–1991)

Member of Parliament, Rajya Sabha
- In office 1956–1962
- Constituency: Tripura

Personal details
- Born: 1912
- Died: 1991 (aged 78–79)
- Party: Indian National Congress

Abdul Latif (born 1912 – died 1991) was an Indian politician from the Indian National Congress. He was Member of the Parliament of India, representing Tripura in the Rajya Sabha from 1956 to 1962.
