= Ramrao Deshmukh =

Indian politician

Ramrao Alias Annasaheb Madhavrao Deshmukh
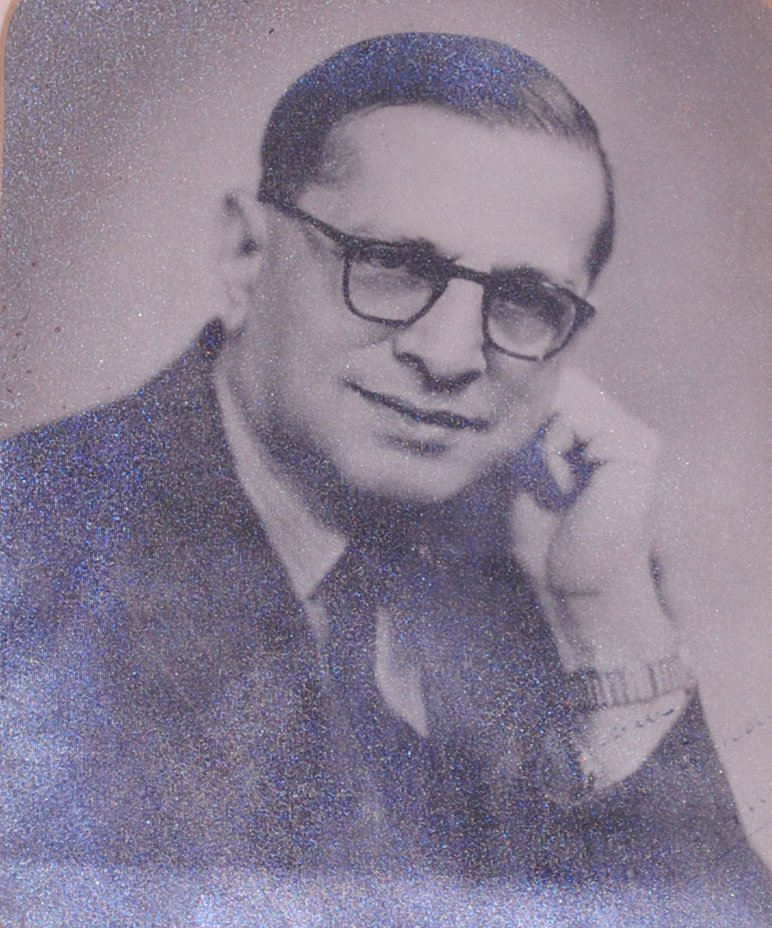
- Deshmukh, during his tenure as the High Commissioner for British India in the Union of South Africa.

Member of Parliament
- In office 3-4-1952 to 2-4-1964

High Commissioner of India to the Union of South Africa

Prime Minister of Rewa State

Personal details
- Born: 25 November 1892 Pimplod, Berar Province, British India
- Died: 20 April 1981 (Aged 89) Amravati, Maharashtra, Republic of India
- Spouse: Smt. Shashikalabai Kadam
- Children: One son & four daughters: Snehalata Shitole; Vanamala Mohite; Pushpamala Deshmukh; Shashikumar a.k.a. Shankarrao Deshmukh (Founder member of and former president of the Vidharbha Youth Welfare Society.); Neelam Naik Nimbalkar
- Parent: Shri. Madhavrao Shankerrao Deshmukh (father)
- Education: M.A., L.L.B (Cantab)
- Alma mater: King Edward's College Amravati, University of Cambridge
- Awards: Padma Bhushan

Ramrao Madhavrao Deshmukh was a prominent political and academic personality from Amravati, Maharashtra. He was one of the very few barristers from the region at that time.

== Political life ==
He has been a member of and has presided over many important political establishments during and after the British Rule. Some of the important establishments that he has been associated with and his position in those establishments are stated below:

- Central Provinces and Berar Legislative Council, Member. Time Frame: 1920–25, 1927–30 and 1937–41
- Government Of Central Provinces and Berar, Minister. Time Frame: 1927–28, 1929–30 and 1937–38.
- Gwalior State, Minister. Time Frame: 1941–44
- High Commissioner for India in the Union of South Africa. Time Frame: 1945–47
- Rewa State, Prime Minister. Time Frame: 1947–48
- Central Legislative Assembly, Member. Time Frame: 1926–27
- Rajya Sabha, Member. Time Frame: 3-4-1952 to 2-4-1958 and 3-4-1958 to 2-4-1964
- Padmabhushan – 1971.
