= Ram Kripal Singh =

Indian politician

Member of Parliament, Rajya Sabha
- In office 1952-1961
- Constituency: Uttar Pradesh

Personal details
- Born: 1892
- Died: 1961 (aged 68–69)
- Party: Indian National Congress

Ram Kripal Singh was an Indian politician. He was a Member of Parliament, representing Uttar Pradesh in the Rajya Sabha the upper house of India's Parliament representing the Indian National Congress.
