= Onkar Nath =

Indian politician

Member of Parliament, Rajya Sabha
- In office 1956–1960
- In office 1952-1955
- Constituency: Delhi

Personal details
- Born: 6 November 1904
- Died: 23 March 1971 (aged 66)
- Party: Indian National Congress

Onkar Nath (1904-1971) was an Indian politician. He was a Member of Parliament, representing Delhi in the Rajya Sabha, the upper house of India's Parliament as a member of the Indian National Congress.
