= Satyendra Mazumdar =

Indian politician

Member of Parliament, Rajya Sabha
- In office 1952-1957
- Constituency: West Bengal

Personal details
- Party: Communist Party of India
- Spouse: Amiya Mazumdar

Satyendra Narayan Mazumdar was an Indian politician. He was a Member of Parliament, representing West Bengal in the Rajya Sabha the upper house of India's Parliament as a member of the Communist Party of India.
