= Angelina Tiga =

Indian politician

Tiga Angelina

Member of Parliament, Rajya Sabha
- In office 03 April 1952 – 02 April 1954
- Constituency: Bihar

Personal details
- Born: 3 August 1909
- Party: Jharkhand Party

Tiga Angelina was an Indian politician . She was a Member of Parliament, representing Bihar in the Rajya Sabha the upper house of India's Parliament as a member of the Jharkhand Party.
