= Jagannath Prasad Agrawal =

Indian politician

Member of Parliament, Rajya Sabha
- In office 1952–1964
- Constituency: Uttar Pradesh

Personal details
- Party: Indian National Congress

Jagannath Prasad Agrawal was an Indian politician. He was a Member of Parliament elect, representing Uttar Pradesh in the Rajya Sabha the upper house of India's Parliament representing the Indian National Congress.
