= Jagadisan Mohandas Kumarappa =

Indian author and parliamentarian

Jagadisan Mohandas Kumarappa (1886–1957) was an Indian author and parliamentarian. He was nominated to the Rajya Sabha in 1952 and served till 1954.

== Early life ==
Born on April 16, 1886, he was the son of Shri S.D. Cornelius; and Shrimati Esther Rajanayagam. His wife Rathnam Appasamy was the daughter of well known lawyer Dewan Bahadur A.S. Appasamy . He was Member of the Rajya Sabha, from 3 April 1952 to 2 April 1954; Author of a few books; Died on 18 November 1957. He did his B.A. (Ohio) and M.A. (Harvard), S.T.B. (Boston), M.A., Ph.D., (Columbia).

== Sources ==
- Brief Biodata
- Former Directors of Tata Institute of Social Sciences
