= Kazi Syed Karimuddin =

Indian politician

Member of Parliament, Rajya Sabha
- In office 3 April 1954 – 2 April 1958
- Constituency: Madhya Pradesh

Member of the Provisional Parliament of India
- In office 1950–1952
- Constituency: Madhya Pradesh

Member of the Constituent Assembly of India
- In office 1946–1950
- Constituency: Central Provinces and Berar

Member of the Central Provinces and Berar Legislative Assembly
- In office 1946–1952

Personal details
- Born: 19 July 1899 Darwha, Yavatmal, Hyderabad State (present-day Maharashtra)
- Died: 14 November 1977 (aged 78)
- Party: Indian National Congress
- Other political affiliations: All India Muslim League
- Education: Aligarh Muslim University

Kazi Syed Karimuddin MA, LLB (19 July 1899, in Yavatmal District, Maharashtra – 14 November 1977) was a member of the Constituent Assembly of India that framed the Indian Constitution.

The son of Kazi Syed Naseeruddin and Diyanat Begum R/O Darwha, Yavatmal District, Hyderabad State, he studied at the Aligarh Muslim University founded by Sir Syed Ahmed Khan. A criminal lawyer par excellence, he was a prominent member of the Congress party. His younger brother, Kazi Syed Gyasuddin, was a famous criminal lawyer (also LLB from Aligarh) and a Congress MLA from Balapur and held several ministerial positions in Maharashtra Assembly (1951–62) in the Second Yashwantrao Chavan ministry of Bombay and First Yashwantrao Chavan ministry of Maharashtra.

As well as participating in the Constituent Assembly that framed the constitution for independent India from 1947 to 1950, he was a member of the Madhya Pradesh Legislative Assembly until 1952 (at that time Madhya Pradesh was known as the Central Province). Following that he was a member of the Rajya Sabha (the upper house of the Indian Parliament) from 1954 to 1958. He moved an amendment on the lines of American Constitution to make right to privacy a fundamental right but Dr. B. R. Ambedkar gave it only reserved support.

He had three sons and five daughters. His sons-in-law include Syed Mukassir Shah, former chairman of the Andhra Pradesh Legislative Council and Justice M. M. Qazi, former chairman of the Maharashtra Administrative Council and retired High Court judge.
