= Gangaram Thaware =

Indian politician (1902–1952)

Gangaram Thaware (23 April 1902 – 16 August 1952) was a member of the Rajya Sabha. Shri Gangaramji Thaware was born in Jamb, in Maharashtra. His father's name was Mathaji Thaware and mother's name was Kautukabai Thaware.

== Early life ==
Shri Gangaramji Thaware completed his primary education in Jamb in 1912. Then he was sent to Tumsar for higher education. He went to Nagpur in 1916 for further education. However, he discontinued his education in 1918.

He married Champa in 1918 and after her death he married Mainavati. Thaware had a son named Nana Thaware (Rushikesh Thaware).

Shri G. M. Thaware was a strict Mahanubhav Panthi. As such he was strict vegetarian and teetotaler throughout his life. It is said that he was inspired by the thoughts and deeds of Kisan Fagu Bansod and dedicated himself to social service.

Shri Thaware thought that all the sub-castes should not adhere to the castes system. They should encourage inter-dining and inter-caste marriage. They should discard all the old traditions and superstitions. They should be educated and unite for a common cause.

== Political life ==
The Mahanubhav Panthiya Ashprushya Samaj was established in the year 1935. Its President was Raosheb Thaware. In the year 1920, he opened one primary school and one library in Nagpur. In the year 1922, he founded an educational institute. Classes commenced at the night school at Sadar Bazaar, Nagpur in 1920.

From 1926 to 1944, he was the secretary of All India Depressed Classes Association. However after the death of Shri M. C. Rajah (its president) the association virtually came to an end. He was in the SCF from 1945 to 1949. He tried to organize the labor force working in Public Work Department (PWD), Railway Textile Industries and Bidi Factories. He became the president of Cottons Union of Textile NA Co.

He joined the Congress in 1950. He had contested the elections for the legislative assembly of CP and Berar in 1937, for the Bhandara Sakoli Reserved seat, but he was defeated by ILP candidate Raghobaji Ghadichor. He was to contest for the first Lok Sabha for the Bhandara Constituency but his nomination was rejected. He was then elected to the Rajya Sabha from Madhya Pradesh State for Indian National Congress (INC) in the year 1952 (3 April 1952 to 16 August 1952).

He died at New Delhi on 16 August 1952 at the age of 50.
