= Baidyanath Rath =

Indian politician (1911–2007)

Member of Parliament, Rajya Sabha
- In office 1952–1954
- Constituency: Odisha

Personal details
- Born: 14 April 1911
- Died: 2 March 2007 (aged 95)
- Party: Communist Party of India
- Spouse: Tilottama Devi

Baidyanath Rath (14 April 1911 – 2 March 2007) was an Indian politician. He was a Member of Parliament, representing Odisha in the Rajya Sabha the upper house of India's Parliament as a member of the Communist Party of India. Rath died on 2 March 2007, at the age of 95.
