= B. V. Kakkilaya =

Indian freedom fighter

Member of Parliament, Rajya Sabha
- In office 3 April 1952 – 2 April 1954
- Constituency: Madras State

Member of Mysore Legislative Assembly
- In office 1978–1983
- Preceded by: Constituency established
- Succeeded by: A. Rukmayya Poojary
- Constituency: Vittal
- In office 1972–1977
- Preceded by: K. L. Rai
- Succeeded by: B. A. Mohiddin
- Constituency: Bantval

Personal details
- Born: Bevinje Vishnu Kakkilaya; 11 April 1919 Bevinje, South Canara, Madras Presidency, British India
- Died: 4 June 2012 (aged 93) Mangalore, Karnataka, India
- Party: Communist Party of India
- Other political affiliations: Communist Party of India (Marxist)
- Spouse: Ahalya (m. 1964; died 1998)
- Children: 4
- Occupation: Political activist; writer

Bevinje Vishnu Kakkilaya (11 April 1919 – 4 June 2012) was an Indian independence activist, writer and a senior leader of the Communist Party of India. Following India's independence, he served as a member of the Rajya Sabha, the upper House of the Parliament of India, and as member of the Karnataka Legislative Assembly.

Kakkilaya fought for the rights of laborers and workers. He was jailed during the British rule of India for his struggle against the oppression of poor people. Even after India was made independent from Britain on August 15, 1947, he continued his fight for the rights of poor people in society. He was at the forefront of organising Beedi workers to get them benefits as per law and also improve their working conditions. He also highlighted the plight of Mangalore tile workers and agricultural labourers working in cardamom, coffee estates, and plantations. B.V. Kakkilaya fought for the unification of Kannada-speaking areas into Karnataka state. Even though Kasargod was taluk in erstwhile South Kanara district during British rule, it was left out of Karnataka state and added to Kerala state in 1956 during the reorganisation of states in independent India. He worked as the general secretary of Akhanda Karnataka Rajya Nirmana Parishat.

== Biography ==
Kakkilaya was born on 11 April 1919 in Bevinje, a village in Kasargod district of the erstwhile Madras Presidency of British India (now in Kerala). He completed his schooling in Kasaragod's Basel Mission Higher Secondary School and the District Board High School. While in St. Aloysius College, Mangalore, where he pursued his intermediate course, he was attracted to the independence movement and was exposed to the Communist ideology. He also secured a degree in chemistry there in 1942.

In 1940, Kakkilaya became a member of the Communist Party of India (CPI), and between 1941 and 1942, he served as secretary of the Mangalore unit of the All India Students' Federation, the students' wing of the CPI. Despite the ideological opposition of the party towards the Quit India Movement, Kakkilaya participated in it, and was imprisoned in September 1942, on charges of possession of banned literature. He was kept in detention in the Mangalore sub-jail for a period of nine months. Upon return, Kakkilaya became a full-time activist with the CPI against the wishes of his family.

== Political career ==
- Member of the Rajya Sabha from Madras Assembly between 1952 and 1954.
- MLA Bantwal from 1972 to 1978 and Vittal constituency from 1978 to 1983.

== As a writer ==
Some of his works are on

- Communism
- Bhoomi mathu akasha
- Maanavana Nadige Vijnanadedege
- Karl Marx: Baduku, baraha
- Bharathiya Chinthane, Hindu dharma, Communism
- Bharathada muslimarau, a translation of Sacchar committee report and others.
- Iravu Mattu Arivu
- Pracheena Bharathadalli Bhouthikavada
- Bhaarateeya Darshanagalu
- Puran Chandra Joshi - Communist Chaluvaliya Roovari
- Pracheena Bharatadalli Jatigala Ugama
- Bharatakkondu Badalu Dari
