= Samiulla Khan =

Indian politician

Member of Parliament Rajya Sabha
- In office 1952–1954
- Constituency: Madhya Pradesh

Personal details
- Born: 1899
- Died: 1967 (aged 67–68)
- Party: Indian National Congress

Samiulla Khan was an Indian politician. He was a Member of Parliament, representing Madhya Pradesh in the Rajya Sabha the upper house of India's Parliament representing the Indian National Congress.
