= Chandravati Lakhanpal =

Indian politician

Member of Parliament, Rajya Sabha
- In office 1952–1962
- Constituency: Uttar Pradesh

Personal details
- Born: 29 December 1904
- Died: 31 March 1969 (aged 64)
- Party: Indian National Congress

Chandravati Lakhanpal (1904-1969) was an Indian politician. She was a Member of Parliament, representing Uttar Pradesh in the Rajya Sabha the upper house of India's Parliament representing the Indian National Congress.
