= Amar Nath Agarwal =

Indian politician

Member of Parliament, Rajya Sabha
- In office 1952–1960
- Constituency: Uttar Pradesh

Personal details
- Born: 1904
- Died: 1981 (aged 76–77)
- Party: Indian National Congress

Amar Nath Agarwal was an Indian politician. He was a Member of Parliament, representing Uttar Pradesh in the Rajya Sabha the upper house of India's Parliament representing the Indian National Congress
