= Lavji Lakhamshi =

Indian politician

Member of Parliament, Rajya Sabha
- In office 1952-1960
- Constituency: Kutch

Personal details
- Born: 10 October 1910
- Died: 31 July 1972 (aged 61)
- Party: Indian National Congress

Lavji Lakhamshi (1910-1972) was an Indian politician. He was a Member of Parliament, representing Gujarat in the Rajya Sabha the upper house of India's Parliament as a member of the Indian National Congress.
