= Amolakh Chand =

Indian politician

Member of Parliament, Rajya Sabha
- In office 1952–1960
- Constituency: Uttar Pradesh

Personal details
- Born: 11 January 1907
- Died: 18 November 1963 (aged 56)
- Party: Indian National Congress

Amolakh Chand (1907-1963) was an Indian politician. He was a Member of Parliament representing Uttar Pradesh in the Rajya Sabha the upper house of India's Parliament as a member of the Indian National Congress.
