= N. Gopalaswami Ayyangar =

Gopalaswami Ayyangar Indian politician

Dewan Bahadur Sir N. Gopalaswami Ayyangar CSI, CIE
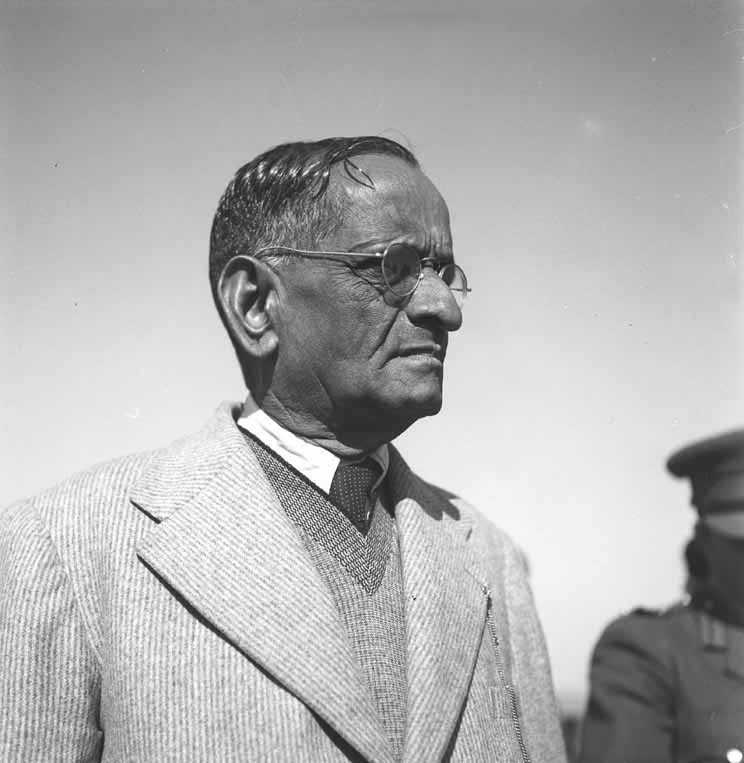

2nd Minister of Defence
- In office 13 May 1952 – 10 February 1953
- President: Rajendra Prasad
- Prime Minister: Jawaharlal Nehru
- Preceded by: Baldev Singh
- Succeeded by: Jawaharlal Nehru

1st Leader of the House in Rajya Sabha
- In office 13 May 1952 – 10 February 1953
- President: Rajendra Prasad
- Prime Minister: Jawaharlal Nehru
- Preceded by: Position established
- Succeeded by: Charu Chandra Biswas

Minister of Railways & Transport
- In office 22 September 1948 – 13 May 1952
- Monarch: King George VI (1936-1950)
- President: Rajendra Prasad
- Prime Minister: Jawaharlal Nehru
- Succeeded by: Lal Bahadur Shastri

Prime Minister of Jammu and Kashmir
- In office 1937 – 9 April 1943
- Monarch: Hari Singh
- Succeeded by: Kailash Nath Haksar

Personal details
- Born: Narasimha Ayyangar Gopalaswami Ayyangar; 31 March 1882 Tanjore district, Madras Presidency, British India
- Died: 10 February 1953 (aged 70) Madras, Madras State, India (now Chennai, Tamil Nadu)

Diwan Bahadur Sir Narasimha Gopalaswami Ayyangar CSI CIE (31 March 1882 – 10 February 1953) was an Indian civil servant and statesman, who served as the prime minister of the princely state of Jammu and Kashmir and later a minister in the first cabinet of independent India. He was a member of the drafting committee of the Constitution of India, the leader of the Rajya Sabha, a 'minister without portfolio' looking after Kashmir Affairs, and the Minister for Railways.

In his Kashmir Affairs role, he represented India at the United Nations Security Council and later drafted the Article 370 of the Indian Constitution that granted autonomy to Jammu and Kashmir.

== Early life and education ==
Gopalaswami Ayyangar was born on 31 March 1882 in Tanjore District, Madras Presidency. He studied at the Wesley School, and at the Presidency and Law Colleges in Madras, whereafter, for a short period in 1904, he was an assistant professor in Pachaiyappa's College.

== Career ==
In 1905, Ayyangar joined the Madras Civil Service. He served as a Deputy Collector till 1919, and was promoted to Collector and District Magistrate in 1920. He was the Registrar-General of Panchayats and Inspector of Local Boards for seven years from 1921. During this time many villages panchayats were organized in the districts of Ramnad and Guntur. Then for three years, he was Collector and District Magistrate in Anantapur. Following that he was Inspector of Municipal Councils and Local Boards till 1932. Ayyangar served as Secretary to Government in the Public Works Department from 1932 to 1934. Finally, he served as a member of the Board of Revenue until 1937. The second phase of his career was devoted to politics. He was Prime Minister of Jammu and Kashmir from 1937-1943 and was appointed Council of State from 1943-1947. During that time he was Chairman of the Committee for the Indianisation of Army. From 1947-1948 he served as Minister without Portfolio in the first cabinet under Jawaharlal Nehru. This was followed by his sojourn as Minister of Railways and Transport from 1948-1952, and finally, he served as defence minister from 1952 to 1953.

== Prime Minister of Kashmir (1937–1943) ==
Ayyangar's political career gained prominence during his tenure as Prime Minister of Jammu and Kashmir (1937–1943). His term ended on April 9, 1943.

== Government of India ==
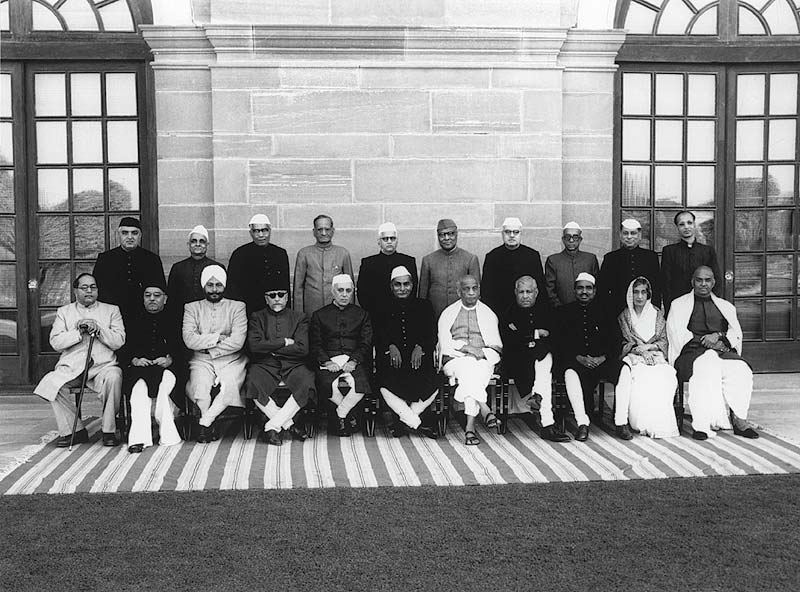
The first cabinet of independent India. Gopalaswami Ayyangar is fourth from the left in the back row

=== Constituent Assembly of India ===
In 1946, Ayyangar was elected to the Constituent Assembly of India, which convened in December 1946 with Jawaharlal Nehru as its president. Ayyangar was appointed to the seven-member Drafting Committee that formulated the Indian Constitution.

=== Kashmir affairs ===
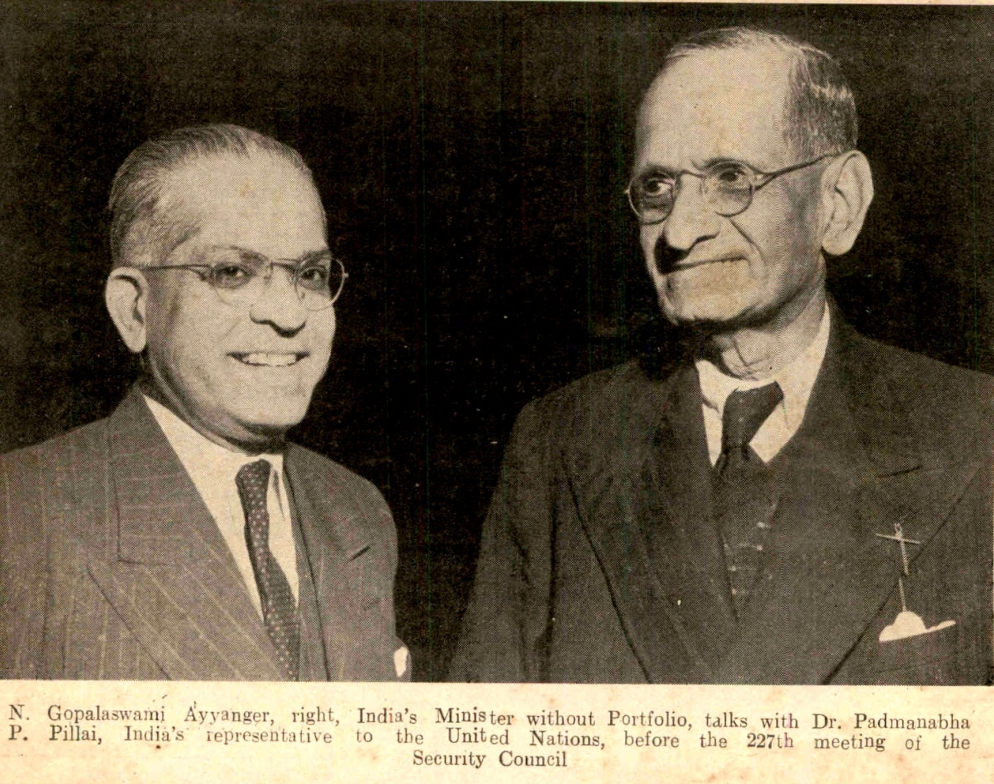
Gopalaswami Ayyanger (right) with Padmanabha Pillai, Indian representative at the United Nations (UN)

Soon after the accession of Jammu and Kashmir in October 1947, Nehru appointed Ayyangar as a cabinet minister without portfolio and asked him to look after Kashmir affairs, while Nehru himself held the overall charge for Kashmir. The move caused friction with the home minister Vallabhbhai Patel, who should have normally been responsible for Kashmir along with all other princely states.

Ayyangar led the delegation representing India in the United Nations over the Kashmir dispute in 1948. In 1952, Prime Minister Nehru appointed him as India's representative in the ongoing negotiations and discussions about Kashmir at the Geneva talks.

Ayyangar was the chief drafter of Article 370 which granted local autonomy to the state of Jammu and Kashmir.

=== Minister of Railways and Transport ===
During his tenure as Minister for Railways and Transport from 1948 to 1952, the railways experienced considerable growth and expansion in services and equipment. He was the main architect in the regrouping of the Indian Railways into six zonal systems - Central, Eastern, Northern, North-eastern, Southern, and Western. Under his leadership, the operation of the railways was smooth and productive. The railway budget also reported surplus earnings at this time.

=== Reorganization of Government ===
In 1949, he presented his report on the "Reorganization of the Government Machinery" in an effort to streamline government services and maintain efficiency in the public sphere. He recommended the establishment of four standing committees, and, as a result of this report, the Defence Committee, the Economic Committee, the Parliamentary and Legal Affairs Committee, and the Administrative Organization Committee were formed by the Union government.

== Death ==
Ayyangar died in Madras at the age of 71 on 10 February 1953, and was survived by his wife, a son, G. Parthasarathy, who was then Assistant Editor of The Hindu, and a daughter.

== Honors ==
A distinguished administrator and a civil servant, Ayyangar held seven titles until 1947 including the title of Diwan Bahadur, the highest title awarded by a British viceroy. Other titles conferred on him by the British government were a Companion of the Order of the Indian Empire (CIE) in the 1935 Silver Jubilee and Birthday Honours list, a Companion of the Order of the Star of India (CSI) in the 1937 Coronation Honours list and a knighthood in 1941 New Year Honours list.
