= Suresh Chandra Majumdar =

Indian politician and Journalist

Member of Parliament, Rajya Sabha
- In office 1952–1954
- Constituency: West Bengal

Personal details
- Born: December 1888
- Died: Unknown
- Party: Indian National Congress

Suresh Chandra Majumdar was an Indian politician. He was a Member of Parliament, representing West Bengal in the Rajya Sabha the upper house of India's Parliament as a member of the Indian National Congress.
