= Charu Chandra Biswas =

Indian judge and politician

Minister of Law and Justice
- In office 1952–1958
- Prime Minister: Jawaharlal Nehru
- Preceded by: Kailash Nath Katju
- Succeeded by: Ashoke Kumar Sen

2nd Leader of the House, Rajya Sabha
- In office February 1953 – November 1954
- Preceded by: N. Gopalaswami Ayyangar
- Succeeded by: Lal Bahadur Shastri

Member of Parliament, Rajya Sabha
- In office 1952–1960
- Constituency: West Bengal

Personal details
- Born: 21 April 1888 Calcutta, British India
- Died: 12 December 1960 (aged 72)
- Party: Indian National Congress
- Spouse: Suhasini Biswas
- Children: 6 daughters
- Parent: Ashutosh Biswas (father)

Charu Chandra Biswas CIE (21 April 1888 – 9 December 1960) was an Indian lawyer, judge and politician. He served as the third Cabin Minister of Law and Justice of India from 1952 to 1957. He was also a member of the Bengal Boundary Commission in 1947, which was chaired by Sir Cyril Radcliffe.

== Life and career ==
Biswas began his career as a lawyer in the Calcutta High Court. The imperial British government appointed him a Companion of the Order of the Indian Empire (CIE) in the 1931 Birthday Honours list. In February 1940, he was appointed a judge of the Calcutta High Court and subsequently as Vice Chancellor of the University of Calcutta in 1949–50.

Biswas was elected to the Upper House of Indian Parliament the Rajya Sabha from 1952 to 1960 from West Bengal. He was the leader of the House in the Rajya Sabha from 1953 to 1954.
