= List of Rajya Sabha elections =

Indian upper house elections

Members of the Rajya Sabha (Council of States) or the upper house of Parliament of India are indirectly elected by the elected Members of the Legislative Assemblies of all the states of India and union territories having a State Legislative Assembly (Delhi, Jammu and Kashmir and Puducherry). Rajya Sabha members represent the states of India. Candidates who win the Rajya Sabha elections are called 'Member of Parliament' and hold their seats for six years. The house meets in the Rajya Sabha Chamber of the Parliament House in New Delhi, on matters relating to creation of new laws, removing or improving the existing laws that affect all citizens of India. Elections take place annually to elect 233 members for the Rajya Sabha, of which one third of the members retire in every two years.

The first elections to the Rajya Sabha took place in 1952.

== Rajya Sabha elections by year ==
Rajya Sabha Elections
1950s	1960s	1970s	1980s	1990s	2000s	2010s	2020s
1952; 1953; 1954; 1955; 1956; 1957; 1958; 1959	1960; 1961; 1962; 1963; 1964; 1965; 1966; 1967; 1968; 1969	1970; 1971; 1972; 1973; 1974; 1975; 1976; 1977; 1978; 1979	1980; 1981; 1982; 1983; 1984; 1985; 1986; 1987; 1988; 1989	1990; 1991; 1992; 1993; 1994; 1995; 1996; 1997; 1998; 1999	2000; 2001; 2002; 2003; 2004; 2005; 2006; 2007; 2008; 2009	2010; 2011; 2012; 2013; 2014; 2015; 2016; 2017; 2018; 2019	2020; 2021; 2022; 2023; 2024; 2025; 2026; 2027; 2028

== See also ==
- Elections in India
- List of Indian presidential elections
- List of Indian vice presidential elections
- List of Indian general elections
- List of Indian state legislative assembly elections
- Government of India
- Parliament of India
- Rajya Sabha
- Member of Parliament, Rajya Sabha
