= 1957 Rajya Sabha elections =

Elections for the Upper House of Indian Parliament

Rajya Sabha elections were held on various dates in 1957, to elect members of the Rajya Sabha, Indian Parliament's upper chamber.

== Elections ==
Elections were held to elect members from various states.

=== Members elected ===
The following members are elected in the elections held in 1957. They are members for the term 1957-1963 and retire in year 1963, except in case of the resignation or death before the term. The list is incomplete.

State - Member - Party

Rajya Sabha members for term 1957-1963
State	Member Name	Party	Remark
Nominated	[[]]	NOM	

== Bye-elections ==
The following bye elections were held in the year 1957.

State - Member - Party

1. Delhi - Maganlal B Joshi - INC ( ele 31/01/1957 term till 1962 ) res 01/03/1962 LS
2. Delhi - S. K. Dey - INC ( ele 31/01/1957 res 01/03/1962 3LS)
3. Andhra - M H Samuel - INC ( ele 18/04/1957 term till 1958 )
4. Orissa - Bhubananda Das - INC ( ele 20/04/1957 dea. 23/02/1958 )
5. Punjab - Rajkumari Amrit Kaur - INC ( ele 20/04/1957 term till 1958 )
6. Punjab - Jugal Kishore - INC ( ele 20/04/1957 term till 1962 )
7. Rajasthan - Jai Narayan Vyas - INC ( ele 20/04/1957 term till 1960 )
8. Madras - T.S. Pattabiraman - INC ( ele 20/04/1957 term till 1960 )
9. Madras - N Ramakrishna Iyer - INC ( ele 20/04/1957 term till 1960 )
10. Bombay - Maganlal B Joshi - INC ( ele 22/04/1957 term till 1958)
11. Bombay - Sonusinh D Patil - INC ( ele 22/04/1957 term till 1958 )
12. Bombay - Jethalal H Joshi - INC ( ele 22/04/1957 term till 1960 )
13. Bombay - P. N. Rajabhoj - INC ( ele 22/04/1957 term till 1962)
14. Uttar Pradesh - Purushottam Das Tandon - INC ( ele 22/04/1957 term till 1962 ) res 01/01/1960
15. Uttar Pradesh - Hira Vallabha Tripathi - INC ( ele 22/04/1957 term till 1960 )
16. Madras - S Ammu - INC ( ele 22/04/1957 term till 1960 )
17. Kerala - Dr Parekunnel J Thomas- IND ( ele 22/04/1957 term till 1962 )
18. Mysore - B C Nanjundaiya - INC ( ele 25/04/1957 term till 1960 )
19. Mysore - B Shiva Rao - INC ( ele 25/04/1957 term till 1960 )
20. Bihar - Sheel Bhadra Yajee - INC ( ele 27/04/1957 term till 1958 )
21. Madras - A V Kuhambu - CPI ( ele 27/04/1957 term till 1960 )
22. Orissa - Bhubananda Das - INC ( ele 27/04/1957 term till 1958 ) dea 23/02/1958
23. Orissa -Lingraj Mishra - INC ( ele 27/04/1957 term till 1962 ) dea 19/12/1957
24. Assam - Suresh Chandra Deb - INC ( ele 03/05/1957 term till 1960 )
25. West Bengal - Santosh Kumar Basu - INC ( ele 03/05/1957 term till 1958 )
26. West Bengal - Sitaram Daga- INC ( ele 03/05/1957 term till 1958 )
27. West Bengal - Dr Nihar Ranjan Ray - INC ( ele 03/05/1957 term till 1962 )
28. Nominated - Dr Tara Chand - NOM ( ele 22/08/1957 term till 1962 )
29. Madras - Ammu Swaminathan - INC ( ele 09/11/1957 term till 1960 )
30. Bombay - Jadavji K Modi - INC ( ele 21/11/1957 term till 1962)
