= 1975 elections in India =

Elections in India
- 1975

This is a list of elections that happened in India during 1975. This is also the year when Prime Minister Indira Gandhi declared a state of emergency, one of the consequences of which was the suspension of elections.

== Legislative Assembly elections ==
=== Gujarat ===
Party	Votes	%	Seats	+/–
Indian National Congress	3,280,514	40.70	75	-65
Indian National Congress (Organisation)	1,901,751	23.60	56	+40
Kisan Mazdoor Lok Paksha	929,428	11.53	12	New
Bharatiya Jana Sangh	710,490	8.82	18	-1
Bharatiya Lok Dal	116,873	1.45	2	New
Rashtriya Majdoor Paksha	97,719	1.21	1	+1
Socialist Party (India)	58,509	0.73	2	+2
Others	31,038	0.39	0	0
Independents	933,430	11.58	16	+8
Total	8,059,752	100.00	182	+13
Valid votes	8,059,752	95.93		
Invalid/blank votes	342,317	4.07		
Total votes	8,402,069	100.00		
Registered voters/turnout	13,981,348	60.09		
Source: ECI

== Legislative By-elections ==
1975 Meghalaya Legislative Assembly by-election : Songsak
Party	Candidate	Votes	%	±%
AHL	Miriam D. Shira	2,268	82.68%	New
Independent	Jangsan Sangma	475	17.32%	New
Margin of victory		1,793	65.37%	▲6.54
Turnout		2,743		

== Rajya Sabha elections ==
These people were elected and subsequently served from 1975 to 1981.

=== Gujarat ===
Member Name	Party
Harisinh B Mahida	INC
Viren J Shah	IND
Prof Ramlal Parikh	JAN

=== Sikkim ===
- Leonard Soloman Saring – INC

=== West Bengal ===
Member Name	Party
Jaharlal Banerjee	
Pratima Bose	INC
Pranab Mukherjee	INC
Prof D P Chattopadhyaya	INC
Kalyan Roy	CPI
Ahmad H Mondal	INC
