= 1975 Rajya Sabha elections =

Elections for the Upper House of Indian Parliament

Rajya Sabha elections were held on various dates in 1975, to elect members of the Rajya Sabha, Indian Parliament's upper chamber.

== Elections ==
Elections were held to elect members from various states.

=== Members elected ===
The following members are elected in the elections held in 1975. They are members for the term 1975-1981 and retire in year 1981, except in case of the resignation or death before the term. The list is incomplete.

State - Member - Party

Rajya Sabha members for term 1975-1981
State	Member Name	Party	Remark
Gujarat	Harisinh B Mahida	INC	res 15/03/1985
Gujarat	Viren J Shah	IND	
Gujarat	Prof Ramlal Parikh	JAN	
Sikkim	Leonard Soloman Saring	INC	
West Bengal	Jaharlal Banerjee	INC	R
West Bengal	Pratima Bose	INC	
West Bengal	Pranab Mukherjee	INC	
West Bengal	Prof D P Chattopadhyaya	INC	
West Bengal	Kalyan Roy	CPI	
West Bengal	Ahmad H Mondal	INC	

== Bye-elections ==
The following bye elections were held in the year 1975.

State - Member - Party

1. Jammu and Kashmir - Syyed Mir Qasim - JKNC ( ele 29/07/1975 term till 1978 ) res of D. P. Dhar
2. Bihar - Hussain Zawar - JKNC ( ele 20/12/1975 term till 1978 )
