= 1977 Rajya Sabha elections =

Rajya Sabha elections were held on various dates in 1977, to elect members of the Rajya Sabha, Indian Parliament's upper chamber.

== Elections ==
Elections were held to elect members from various states.

=== Members elected ===
The following members are elected in the elections held in 1977. They are members for the term 1977-1983 and retire in year 1983, except in case of the resignation or death before the term. The list is incomplete.

State - Member - Party

Rajya Sabha members for term 1977-1983
State	Member Name	Party	Remark
Puducherry	V P M Samy	AIADMK	
Tamil Nadu	G K Moopanar	INC	
Tamil Nadu	Murasoli Maran	DMK	
Tamil Nadu	A P Janardhanam	AIADMK	
Tamil Nadu	U. R. Krishnan	AIADMK	
Tamil Nadu	Noorjehan Razack	AIADMK	
Tamil Nadu	P. Ramamurti	CPM	

== Bye-elections ==
The following bye elections were held in the year 1977.

State - Member - Party

1. Haryana - Sujan Singh - INC ( ele 13/07/1977 term till 1978)
2. WB - Ananda Pathak - CPM ( ele 13/07/1977 term till 1978)
3. Orissa - Patitpaban Pradhan - LD ( ele 13/07/1977 term till 1982)
4. Karnataka - T. V. Chandrashekarappa - INC ( ele 14/07/1977 term till 1978 )
5. Karnataka - L G Havanur - INC ( ele 14/07/1977 term till 1978 )
6. Uttar Pradesh - Narendra Singh - JAN ( ele 14/07/1977 term till 1978 )
7. Uttar Pradesh - Dr M M S Siddhu - JAN ( ele 14/07/1977 term till 1978 )
8. Madhya Pradesh - Baleshwar Dayal - JAN ( ele 14/07/1977 term till 1978 )
9. Uttar Pradesh - Dinesh Singh - JAN ( ele 14/07/1977 term till 1980 )
10. Uttar Pradesh - K B Asthana - JP ( ele 14/07/1977 term till 1980 )
11. Uttar Pradesh - Shanti Bhushan - JP ( ele 14/07/1977 term till 1980 )
12. Uttar Pradesh - Prem Manohar - JP ( ele 14/07/1977 term till 1980 )
13. Andhra Pradesh - N. G. Ranga - INC ( ele 18/07/1977 term till 1980 ) 08/01/1980
14. Tamil Nadu - E. R. Krishnan - AIADMK ( ele 18/07/1977 term till 1980 )
15. Assam - Tilok Gogoi - INC ( ele 20/07/1977 term till 1980 )
16. Karnataka - L R Naik - INC ( ele 20/07/1977 term till 1980 )
17. Kerala - Thalekkunnil Basheer - INC INC ( ele 20/07/1977 term till 1979 )
