= 1981 Rajya Sabha elections =

1981 election to Indian Parliament's upper chamber

Rajya Sabha elections were held on various dates in 1981, to elect members of the Rajya Sabha, Indian Parliament's upper chamber.

== Elections ==
Elections were held to elect members from various states.

=== Members elected ===
The following members are elected in the elections held in 1981. They are members for the term 1981-1987 and retire in year 1987, except in case of the resignation or death before the term. The list is incomplete.

State - Member - Party

Rajya Sabha members for term 1981-1987
State	Member Name	Party	Remark
Gujarat	Harisinh B Mahida	INC	res 15/03/1985
Gujarat	Pranab Mukherjee	INC	
Gujarat	Kishor Mehta	IND	
Sikkim	Leonard Soloman Saring	INC	
West Bengal	Debendra Nath Barman	CPM	R
West Bengal	Dipen Ghosh	CPM	
West Bengal	Arabinda Ghosh	CPM	dea 08/11/1984
West Bengal	Shankar Prasad Mitra	IND	Dea 09/08/1986
West Bengal	Santosh Mitra	CPM	Dea 28/03/1984
West Bengal	Makhan Paul	RSP	

== Bye-elections ==
The following bye elections were held in the year 1981.

State - Member - Party

1. Andhra Pradesh - M R Apparow - INC ( ele 20/03/1981 term till 1984 )
2. Andhra Pradesh - K.V.R.S. Balasubba Rao - INC ( ele 20/03/1981 term till 1984 )
3. Andhra Pradesh - T Chandrashekhar Reddy - INC ( ele 16/09/1981 term till 1984 ) 15/09/1993
4. Uttar Pradesh - Ram Pujan Patel - INC ( ele 16/09/1981 term till 1986 ) 29/12/1984
5. Uttar Pradesh - Siv Lal Balmiki - INC ( ele 16/09/1981 term till 1982 )
6. West Bengal - Nepaldev Bhattacharjee - CPM ( ele 28/09/1981 term till 1982 )
7. Maharashtra - Dr V H Salaskar - INC ( ele 30/11/1981 term till 1982 )
