= Noor Jahan =

Noor Jahan may refer to:

== People ==
- Nur Jahan (1577–1645), Mughal empress
- Noor Jehan (1926–2000), Pakistani singer and actress
- Nurjahan Begum (1925–2016), Bangladeshi journalist
- Nurjahan Begum (banker), Bangladeshi interim government adviser (2024)
- Nurjahan Murshid (1924–2003), Bangladeshi minister
- Noor Jehan Panezai (died 2014), Pakistani politician
- Noorjehan Razack, Indian politician
- Pooja Bedi (born 1970), also known as Noorjahan, Indian actress

== Other uses ==
- Noor Jehan (film), a 1967 Indian historical drama film about the empress
- Noorjahan (TV series), an Indian historical television series about the empress, aired 2000-01
- Noor Jahaan, a 2018 Indo-Bangla film
- Tomb of Nur Jahan, mausoleum of the empress in Lahore, Pakistan
