= Sankeshwar Assembly constituency =

Former Assembly constituency in Karnataka, India

Coordinates: 16.257715°N 74.485123°E

Sankeshwar
- Former constituency No. 203 for the Karnataka Legislative Assembly

Constituency details
- Country: India
- Region: South India
- State: Karnataka
- Division: Belagavi
- District: Belagavi
- Lok Sabha constituency: Chikkodi
- Established: 1962
- Abolished: 2008
- Reservation: None

Sankeshwar Assembly constituency was one of the constituencies in Karnataka state assembly in India until 2008 when it was made defunct. It was part of Chikkodi Lok Sabha constituency.

== Members of the Legislative Assembly ==
Election	Member	Party
1962	Champabai Piraji Bhogale	Indian National Congress
1967	S. D. Kothawale	Indian National Congress
1972	Lalagouda Balagouda Patil	Indian National Congress
1974^ (Note: Died on 03/04/1973)	S. S. Patil	Indian National Congress
1975^ (Note: Died on 23/10/1974)	B. S. Sarawadi	Indian National Congress
1978	Patil Malhargouda Shankargouda	Indian National Congress
1983	Patil Malhargouda Shankargouda	Indian National Congress
1985	Patil Malhargouda Shankargouda	Indian National Congress
1989	Patil Malhargouda Shankargouda	Indian National Congress
1994	Appayyagouda Basagouda Patil	Janata Dal
1999	Appayyagouda Basagouda Patil	Janata Dal
2004	Appayyagouda Basagouda Patil	Indian National Congress

^ indicates by-election

== Election results ==
=== Assembly Election 2004 ===
2004 Karnataka Legislative Assembly election : Sankeshwar
Party	Candidate	Votes	%	±%
INC	Appayyagouda Basagouda Patil	52,036	54.42	▲23.21
BJP	Rajendra Malagouda Patil	35,828	37.47	New
BSP	Jeevanlatha Naduvinamani	3,292	3.44	New
JD(S)	Irayya Sangayya Haldevaramath	2,009	2.10	▲1.04
RPI(A)	Mahendra J. Mankale	1,571	1.64	New
Kannada Nadu Party	Kasar Harun Nabirasul	875	0.92	New
Margin of victory		16,208	16.95	▼18.10
Turnout		95,682	72.39	▼2.23
Total valid votes		95,611		
Registered electors		132,175		▲8.22
INC gain from JD(U)		Swing	▼11.84	

=== Assembly Election 1999 ===
1999 Karnataka Legislative Assembly election : Sankeshwar
Party	Candidate	Votes	%	±%
JD(U)	Appayyagouda Basagouda Patil	58,699	66.26	New
INC	Patil Malhargouda Shankargouda	27,650	31.21	▲3.44
BRP	Mankale Mahendranand Jotirao	1,300	1.47	New
JD(S)	Jayasheel Appanna Potdar	936	1.06	New
Margin of victory		31,049	35.05	▲15.02
Turnout		91,141	74.62	▼0.89
Total valid votes		88,585		
Rejected ballots		2,523	2.77	▲0.61
Registered electors		122,134		▲8.15
JD(U) gain from JD		Swing	▲18.45	

=== Assembly Election 1994 ===
1994 Karnataka Legislative Assembly election : Sankeshwar
Party	Candidate	Votes	%	±%
JD	Appayyagouda Basagouda Patil	39,885	47.81	▲6.63
INC	Nalawade Madhukar Dattatray	23,172	27.77	▼19.28
INC	Malhargouda Shankargouda Patil	16,048	19.23	New
KRRS	Hedduri Dundappa Shivamurthy	1,654	1.98	New
BJP	Maruti. B. Zirali	1,623	1.95	New
Margin of victory		16,713	20.03	▲14.16
Turnout		85,272	75.51	▲2.45
Total valid votes		83,432		
Rejected ballots		1,840	2.16	▼9.25
Registered electors		112,934		▲3.93
JD gain from INC		Swing	▲0.76	

=== Assembly Election 1989 ===
1989 Karnataka Legislative Assembly election : Sankeshwar
Party	Candidate	Votes	%	±%
INC	Patil Malhargouda Shankargouda	33,088	47.05	▼3.60
JD	Appayyagouda Basagouda Patil	28,960	41.18	New
Kranti Sabha	Shirakoli Shivanand Channabasappa	4,733	6.73	New
Independent	M. S. Yashavant	1,481	2.11	New
JP	Patil Sidagouda Malagouda	1,468	2.09	New
Margin of victory		4,128	5.87	▲1.04
Turnout		79,384	73.06	▲1.37
Total valid votes		70,329		
Rejected ballots		9,055	11.41	▲9.51
Registered electors		108,660		▲22.32
INC hold		Swing	▼3.60	

=== Assembly Election 1985 ===
1985 Karnataka Legislative Assembly election : Sankeshwar
Party	Candidate	Votes	%	±%
INC	Patil Malhargouda Shankargouda	31,643	50.65	▲2.62
JP	Karaguppi Prabhakar Shivamallappa	28,627	45.82	▼1.56
Independent	Appasaheb Raosaheb Patil	785	1.26	New
Independent	Kasabekar Anant Arjun	595	0.95	New
Independent	Mathapati Shivayya Dundayya	458	0.73	New
Margin of victory		3,016	4.83	▲4.18
Turnout		63,683	71.69	▼0.46
Total valid votes		62,472		
Rejected ballots		1,211	1.90	▼0.51
Registered electors		88,831		▲9.89
INC hold		Swing	▲2.62	

=== Assembly Election 1983 ===
1983 Karnataka Legislative Assembly election : Sankeshwar
Party	Candidate	Votes	%	±%
INC	Patil Malhargouda Shankargouda	27,335	48.03	▲44.51
JP	Khot Lakmappa Kallappa	26,965	47.38	▲7.69
Independent	Nesari Shivappa Murugappa	1,091	1.92	New
Independent	Ibrahim Papalal Mulla	386	0.68	New
Independent	Gizovani Baloppa Bheemappa	382	0.67	New
Margin of victory		370	0.65	▼15.94
Turnout		58,325	72.15	▼3.68
Total valid votes		56,917		
Rejected ballots		1,408	2.41	▼0.10
Registered electors		80,834		▲5.63
INC gain from INC(I)		Swing	▼8.25	

=== Assembly Election 1978 ===
1978 Karnataka Legislative Assembly election : Sankeshwar
Party	Candidate	Votes	%	±%
INC(I)	Patil Malhargouda Shankargouda	31,839	56.28	New
JP	Khot Lakhamappa Kallappa	22,452	39.69	New
INC	Maldar. D. H	1,989	3.52	New
Margin of victory		9,387	16.59	
Turnout		58,025	75.83	
Total valid votes		56,571		
Rejected ballots		1,454	2.51	
Registered electors		76,524		
INC(I) gain from INC				

=== Assembly By-election 1975 ===
1975 Karnataka Legislative Assembly by-election : Sankeshwar
Party	Candidate	Votes	%	±%
INC	B. S. Sarawadi			
INC gain from INC(O)				

=== Assembly By-election 1974 ===
1974 Karnataka Legislative Assembly by-election : Sankeshwar
Party	Candidate	Votes	%	±%
INC(O)	S. Satagouda Patil			
INC(O) gain from INC		Swing	▼55.23	

=== Assembly Election 1972 ===
1972 Mysore State Legislative Assembly election : Sankeshwar
Party	Candidate	Votes	%	±%
INC	Lalagouda Balagouda Patil	23,756	55.23	▼4.85
INC(O)	S. Satagouda Patil	19,253	44.77	New
Margin of victory		4,503	10.47	▼31.24
Turnout		44,503	73.32	▲6.29
Total valid votes		43,009		
Registered electors		60,694		▲15.01
INC hold		Swing	▼4.85	

=== Assembly Election 1967 ===
1967 Mysore State Legislative Assembly election : Sankeshwar
Party	Candidate	Votes	%	±%
INC	S. D. Kothawale	19,828	60.08	▼0.01
Independent	S. Y. Patil	6,063	18.37	New
SWA	C. A. Shirkoli	3,915	11.86	New
RPI	C. S. Wali	3,194	9.68	New
Margin of victory		13,765	41.71	▲21.52
Turnout		35,372	67.03	▲10.52
Total valid votes		33,000		
Registered electors		52,774		▲19.46
INC hold		Swing	▼0.01	

=== Assembly Election 1962 ===
1962 Mysore State Legislative Assembly election : Sankeshwar
Party	Candidate	Votes	%	±%
INC	Champabai Piraji Bhogale	14,273	60.09	New
RPI	B. Shankaranand	9,478	39.91	New
Margin of victory		4,795	20.19	
Turnout		24,965	56.51	
Total valid votes		23,751		
Registered electors		44,178		
INC win (new seat)				
