= Songsak Assembly constituency =

Legislative Assembly constituency in Meghalaya State, India

Coordinates: 25.650°N 90.607°E

Songsak
- Constituency No. 41 for the Meghalaya Legislative Assembly

Constituency details
- Country: India
- Region: Northeast India
- State: Meghalaya
- District: East Garo Hills
- Lok Sabha constituency: Tura
- Established: 1972
- Total electors: 31,824
- Reservation: ST

Member of Legislative Assembly
- 11th Meghalaya Legislative Assembly
- Incumbent Mukul Sangma
- Party: Mamata All India Trinamool Congress
- Elected year: 2023

Songsak is one of the 60 Legislative Assembly constituencies of Meghalaya state in India. It is part of East Garo Hills district and is reserved for candidates belonging to the Scheduled Tribes. It falls under Tura Lok Sabha constituency.

== Members of the Legislative Assembly ==
Election	Member	Party
1972	Elwin Sangma	All Party Hill Leaders Conference
1975 By-election	Miriam D. Shira	All Party Hill Leaders Conference
1978	Miriam D. Shira	Independent politician
1983	Elwin Sangma	Indian National Congress
1988	Lahinson M. Sangnia	Hill People's Union
1993	Tonsing N Marak	Indian National Congress
1998	Tonsing N Marak	Indian National Congress
2003	Heltone N. Marak	United Democratic Party
2005 By-election	Tonsing N Marak	Indian National Congress
2008	Nihim D. Shira	Nationalist Congress Party
2013	Nihim D. Shira	National People's Party
2018	Dr. Mukul Sangma	Indian National Congress
2023	Dr. Mukul Sangma	All India Trinamool Congress

== Election results ==
=== Assembly Election 2023 ===
2023 Meghalaya Legislative Assembly election: Songsak
Party	Candidate	Votes	%	±%
AITC	Dr. Mukul Sangma	12,689	44.82%	New
NPP	Nihim D. Shira	12,317	43.51%	▲8.37
INC	Champion R. Sangma	2,232	7.88%	▼34.87
BJP	Thomas Marak	776	2.74%	▼10.06
RPI	Sarenni Marak	296	1.05%	New
NOTA	None of the Above	196	0.69%	▼0.21
Margin of victory		372	1.31%	▼6.30
Turnout		28,310	88.96%	▼1.09
Registered electors		31,824		▲19.25
AITC gain from INC		Swing	▲2.07	

=== Assembly Election 2018 ===
2018 Meghalaya Legislative Assembly election: Songsak
Party	Candidate	Votes	%	±%
INC	Dr. Mukul Sangma	10,274	42.75%	▲22.55
NPP	Nihim D. Shira	8,444	35.14%	▲0.86
BJP	Thomas Marak	3,077	12.80%	New
UDP	Arun N Marak	800	3.33%	▼4.83
Independent	Fardina C. Marak	464	1.93%	New
NCP	Silman Marak	405	1.69%	New
Independent	Sanjay R Marak	274	1.14%	New
NOTA	None of the Above	216	0.90%	New
Margin of victory		1,830	7.62%	▼3.54
Turnout		24,030	90.04%	▲2.19
Registered electors		26,687		▲20.02
INC gain from NPP		Swing	▲8.47	

=== Assembly Election 2013 ===
2013 Meghalaya Legislative Assembly election: Songsak
Party	Candidate	Votes	%	±%
NPP	Nihim D. Shira	6,697	34.28%	New
Independent	Fardina C. Marak	4,518	23.13%	New
INC	Tonsing N Marak	3,947	20.20%	▼11.02
Independent	Lahinson M. Sangnia	2,779	14.23%	New
UDP	Arun N Marak	1,594	8.16%	▼0.33
Margin of victory		2,179	11.15%	▲9.23
Turnout		19,535	87.85%	▼4.82
Registered electors		22,236		▲20.13
NPP gain from NCP		Swing	▲1.13	

=== Assembly Election 2008 ===
2008 Meghalaya Legislative Assembly election: Songsak
Party	Candidate	Votes	%	±%
NCP	Nihim D. Shira	5,687	33.15%	▲18.61
INC	Tonsing N Marak	5,357	31.23%	▲3.56
Independent	Anderson Sangma	4,259	24.83%	New
UDP	Sanjay R Marak	1,456	8.49%	▼5.02
Independent	Clever N. Marak	395	2.30%	New
Margin of victory		330	1.92%	▼2.56
Turnout		17,154	92.67%	▲21.83
Registered electors		18,510		▼6.75
NCP gain from INC		Swing	▲5.49	

=== Assembly By-election 2005 ===
2005 Meghalaya Legislative Assembly by-election: Songsak
Party	Candidate	Votes	%	±%
INC	Tonsing N Marak	3,890	27.67%	▼5.07
Independent	Anderson Sangma	3,260	23.18%	New
Independent	Sanjay R Marak	2,063	14.67%	New
NCP	Nihim D. Shira	2,045	14.54%	▼16.61
UDP	Doly Sangma	1,900	13.51%	▼20.49
Independent	Peter Marak	550	3.91%	New
Independent	Rokhawma Shira	353	2.51%	New
Margin of victory		630	4.48%	▲3.21
Turnout		14,061	70.84%	▼2.39
Registered electors		19,849		▲1.38
INC gain from UDP		Swing	▼6.34	

=== Assembly Election 2003 ===
2003 Meghalaya Legislative Assembly election: Songsak
Party	Candidate	Votes	%	±%
UDP	Heltone N. Marak	4,875	34.00%	▲18.86
INC	Tonsing N Marak	4,693	32.73%	▼1.35
NCP	Anderson Sangma	4,467	31.16%	New
BJP	Anilla D Shira	302	2.11%	New
Margin of victory		182	1.27%	▼17.67
Turnout		14,337	73.26%	▲3.15
Registered electors		19,578		▲14.35
UDP gain from INC		Swing	▼0.08	

=== Assembly Election 1998 ===
1998 Meghalaya Legislative Assembly election: Songsak
Party	Candidate	Votes	%	±%
INC	Tonsing N Marak	4,089	34.08%	▼15.23
UDP	Heltone N. Marak	1,817	15.14%	New
GNC	Lahinson M. Sangnia	1,722	14.35%	New
Independent	Haward N. Sangma	1,590	13.25%	New
Independent	Anderson Sangma	1,522	12.69%	New
Independent	Clearshon K. Sangma	947	7.89%	New
Independent	Miriam D. Shira	311	2.59%	New
Margin of victory		2,272	18.94%	▼4.17
Turnout		11,998	74.29%	▼2.56
Registered electors		17,121		▲20.12
INC hold		Swing	▼15.23	

=== Assembly Election 1993 ===
1993 Meghalaya Legislative Assembly election: Songsak
Party	Candidate	Votes	%	±%
INC	Tonsing N Marak	5,105	49.31%	▲32.37
AHL(AM)	Rockefeller G. Momin	2,713	26.20%	New
HPU	Lahinson M. Sangnia	2,535	24.49%	▼17.86
Margin of victory		2,392	23.10%	▼2.30
Turnout		10,353	75.79%	▲10.86
Registered electors		14,253		▲22.35
INC gain from HPU		Swing		

=== Assembly Election 1988 ===
1988 Meghalaya Legislative Assembly election: Songsak
Party	Candidate	Votes	%	±%
HPU	Lahinson M. Sangnia	3,047	42.34%	New
INC	Choronsing Sangma	1,219	16.94%	▼24.57
Independent	Tonsing Marak	986	13.70%	New
Margin of victory		1,828	25.40%	▲9.86
Turnout		7,196	66.37%	▲7.06
Registered electors		11,649		▲20.80
HPU gain from INC		Swing		

=== Assembly Election 1983 ===
1983 Meghalaya Legislative Assembly election: Songsak
Party	Candidate	Votes	%	±%
INC	Elwin Sangma	2,190	41.51%	▲10.14
HSPDP	Rockefeller G. Momin	1,370	25.97%	New
APHLC	Miriam D. Shira	1,191	22.57%	▲5.69
Independent	Hemson Marak	270	5.12%	New
Independent	Binsing Marak	255	4.83%	New
Margin of victory		820	15.54%	▲11.87
Turnout		5,276	58.45%	▲12.18
Registered electors		9,643		▲24.33
INC gain from Independent		Swing	▲6.47	

=== Assembly Election 1978 ===
1978 Meghalaya Legislative Assembly election: Songsak
Party	Candidate	Votes	%	±%
Independent	Miriam D. Shira	1,156	35.04%	New
INC	Choronsing Sangma	1,035	31.37%	New
APHLC	Arquish Momin	557	16.88%	▼65.80
Independent	Rockefeller G. Momin	551	16.70%	New
Margin of victory		121	3.67%	▼61.70
Turnout		3,299	46.44%	
Registered electors		7,756		
Independent gain from APHLC		Swing	▼47.64	

=== Assembly By-election 1975 ===
1975 Meghalaya Legislative Assembly by-election: Songsak
Party	Candidate	Votes	%	±%
APHLC	Miriam D. Shira	2,268	82.68%	▲7.75
Independent	Jangsan Sangma	475	17.32%	New
Margin of victory		1,793	65.37%	▲6.54
Turnout		2,743		
APHLC hold		Swing	▲7.75	

=== Assembly Election 1972 ===
1972 Meghalaya Legislative Assembly election: Songsak
Party	Candidate	Votes	%	±%
APHLC	Elwin Sangma	819	74.93%	New
Independent	Projengton Momin	176	16.10%	New
Independent	Binjamin Sangma	98	8.97%	New
Margin of victory		643	58.83%	
Turnout		1,093	23.56%	
Registered electors		4,996		
APHLC win (new seat)				

== See also ==
- Songsak
- East Garo Hills district
- Tura (Lok Sabha constituency)
