= Purabi Roy =

Indian scholar, academic and Writer

- পূরবী রায়
- Born: 12 July 1941 (age 85); Kolkata, India
- Education: University of Calcutta (B.A.); Jadavpur University (M.A.); Institute of Oriental Studies of the Russian Academy of Sciences (PhD)
- Occupations: Author; Researcher; Professor
- Employer: Jadavpur University Moscow State University Saint Petersburg State University
- Notable work: The Search for Netaji: New Findings; 75th Anniversary of Indian National Army and Provisional Government
- Spouse: Kalyan Roy
- Parent(s): Peary Mohan Mukherjee, Radha Rani Mukherjee

Purabi Roy ( née Mukherjee; Bengali: পূরবী রায়; born 12 July 1941) is an Indian multi-disciplinary researcher, author, and an eminent scholar in Russian language and history. She has been visiting professor at Moscow State University and Saint Petersburg State University in Russian Federation from 2000 to 2006. She is acknowledged as one of the foremost and veteran researchers on Subhas Chandra Bose and a former member of Indian Council of Historical Research (2015 to 2018).

== Early life and education ==
Purabi Roy was born to Peary Mohan Mukherjee and Radha Rani Mukherjee on 12 July 1941 in Calcutta, India. Her father Peary Mukherjee was the President of Calcutta Club in 1955 and was also a member of the Central Board of Directors, RBI, Eastern area from 1953 to 1955 along with B.M.Birla, O.T.Jenkins, Jiban Krishna Mitter and Dr. Bimala Churn Law.

She received her education at St. John's Diocesan Girls' Higher Secondary School and graduating from Scottish Church College in 1962 under the University of Calcutta she then completed her MA from Jadavpur University in 1964 and Ph.D. in Philology at the Institute of Oriental Studies of the Russian Academy of Sciences in 1974 before being taught at Jadavpur University.

== Academic career ==
In 1995, Asiatic Society sent a three-member team led by Purabi Roy along with Hari Vasudevan and professor Sobhanlal Datta Gupta to Moscow for the collection of documents on Indo-Soviet relations from the period 1917 to 1947 as a protocol signed between the Institute of Oriental Studies of the Russian Academy of Sciences and The Asiatic Society. As a team member, Purabi Roy worked in the (GARF) or State Archive of the Russian Federation, (RGVIA) or Russian State Military Historical Archive and in the (MID) or the Archives of the Ministry of External Affairs.

On her return, Roy joined The Asiatic Society as a research professor and the first volume of the checklist on Indo-Soviet relations was published by The Asiatic Society in 1997 under the title Indo-Russian Relations: 1917-1947. Checklist of Documents. Vol. I.

A specialist of Russian language and politics, Professor Roy participated in various International seminars and conferences. Dr. Roy presented papers at the Institute of Oriental Studies Moscow in 1999, Oriental Faculty of Saint Petersburg State University in 2002, Hamburg University of Germany in 2003 and Lund University of Sweden in 2004. In 2012 Purabi Roy delivered her lecture at Humboldt University of Berlin on New findings on Subhas Chandra Bose based on her research material collected from Russian, German, British and Indian archives.

== Research on Subhas Chandra Bose ==
Till the beginning of the year 2023, there are many debatable versions of Subhas Chandra Bose's disappearance in 1945:

I) Plane crash in Taiwan

II) Ashes in Renkō-ji temple

III) Gumnami Baba

But one of the versions, according to Russian state media Russia Beyond, attracts special attention which is "Soviet" version by Dr. Purabi Roy. It claimed Subhas Chandra Bose's existence in the Soviet Union in 1945.

In the case of Bose's disappearance, Professor Roy claimed Bose was alive in Soviet Russia in 1950s. Though the most important file (File no. 12(226)/56-PM) on Subhas Chandra Bose after 1945, according to news report of Business Insider, had been destroyed in 1972.

Sugata Bose argued and goes with the air crash theory. Chandra Kumar Bose, the grand nephew of Subhas Chandra Bose claimed that the mystery surrounding Bose's disappearance was yet to be resolved.

A group of people claimed that Gumnami Baba was Subhas Chandra Bose, rejected by Subhas Chandra Bose's grand nephew Sugata Bose and Chandra Kumar Bose. According to Dr. Purabi Roy, every account of history should undergo clinical and unbiased scrutiny .

== Bibliography ==
Purabi Roy's recent works on Indian National Army published by The Asiatic Society on the eve of the 75th Anniversary of Indian Independence is 75th Anniversary of Indian National Army and Provisional Government (2021). She has also authored Indian National Army (2021) with Dr. Sarabindu Mukherjee.

No.	Title	Publisher	Editor / Author	Year	ISBN	Pages	Place
1.	Indo-Russian relations XX Cent. Part-I (1917-1928)	The Asiatic Society	Purabi Roy, Sobhanlal Datta Gupta, Hari Vasudevan	1999		397	India
2.	Indo-Russian relations XX Cent. Part-II (1929-1947)	The Asiatic Society	Purabi Roy, Sobhanlal Datta Gupta, Hari Vasudevan	2000	ISBN 978-81-723-6101-3	443	India
3.	Russo-Indian Relations XIX Cent.	The Asiatic Society	Purabi Roy	1999	ISBN 978-81-723-6089-4	502	India
4.	The Search for Netaji: New Findings	Purple Peacock Books & Arts	Purabi Roy	2011	ISBN 978-81-889-0807-3	276	India
5.	Indian National Army	Agam Kala Publications	Purabi Roy, Sarabindu Mukherjee	2021	ISBN 978-81-942-9372-9	274	India
6.	75th Anniversary of Indian National Army and Provisional Government	The Asiatic Society	Purabi Roy	2021	ISBN 978-81-953-4280 -8	342	India

== Personal life ==
Purabi Roy was married to AITUC leader and Rajya Sabha MP Kalyan Roy.
