= 2003 Rajya Sabha elections =

Elections for the upper house of Indian Parliament

(of 228 seats) to the Rajya Sabha
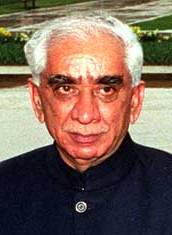

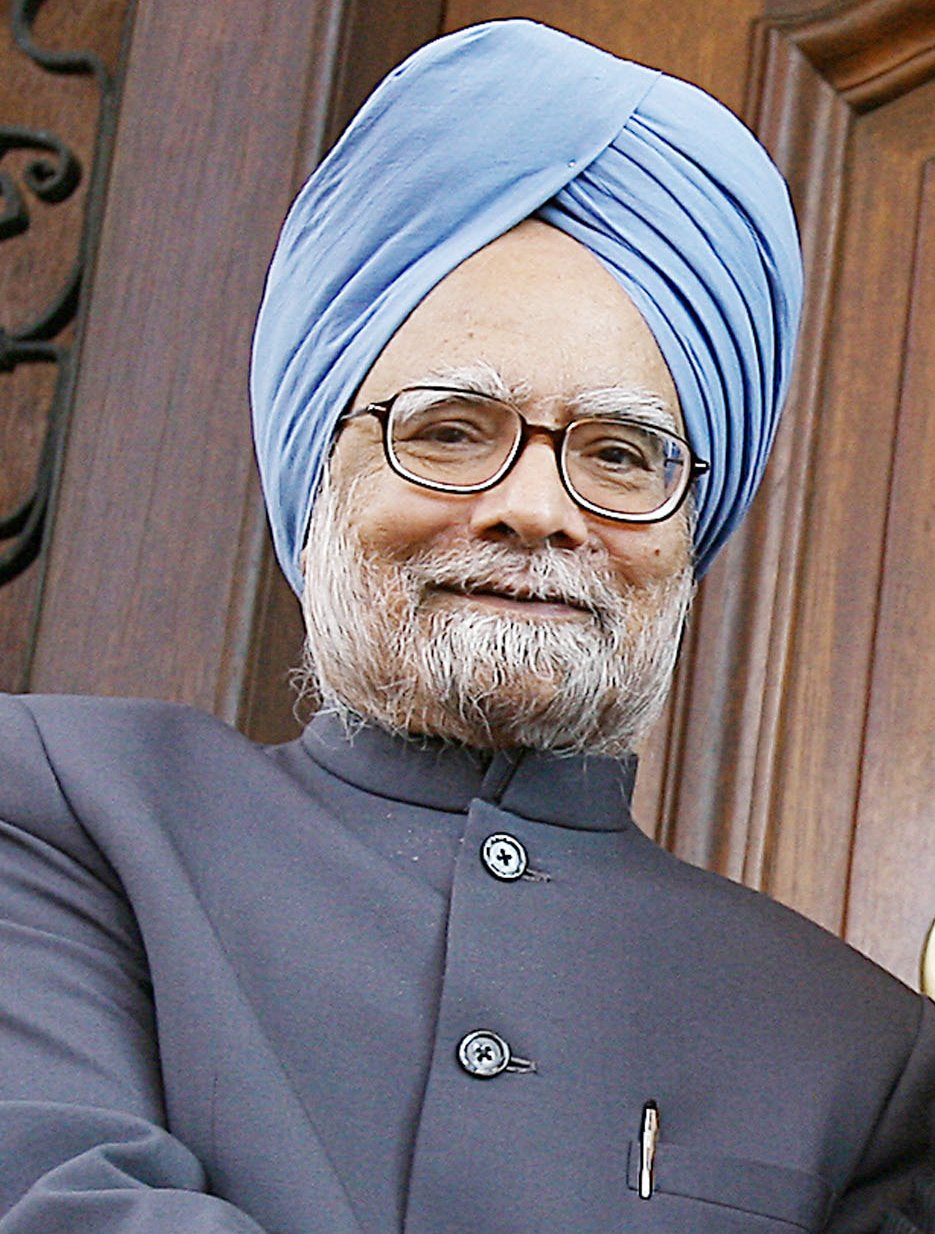
	First party	Second party
Leader	Jaswant Singh	Manmohan Singh
Party	BJP	INC

Rajya Sabha elections were held on various dates in 2003, to elect members of the Rajya Sabha, Indian Parliament's upper chamber. Three members from Kerala and one member from Puducherry were elected.

== Elections ==
Elections were held to elect members from various states.

=== Members elected ===
The following members are elected in the elections held in 2003. They are members for the term 2003–2009 and retire in year 2009, except in case of the resignation or death before the term. The list is incomplete.

State - Member - Party

Rajya Sabha members for term 2003–2009
State	Member Name	Party	Remark
Kerala	K. Chandran Pillai	CPM	
Kerala	Thennala Balakrishna Pillai	INC	
Kerala	Vayalar Ravi	INC	
Puducherry	V. Narayanasamy	INC	

== Bye-elections ==
The following bye elections were held in the year 2003.

State - Member - Party

- Chhattisgarh - Kamla Manhar - INC ( ele 18/09/2003 term till 02/04/2006 ) death of Manhar Bhagatram
