= 2009 Rajya Sabha elections =

Elections for the upper house of Indian Parliament

(of 228 seats) to the Rajya Sabha
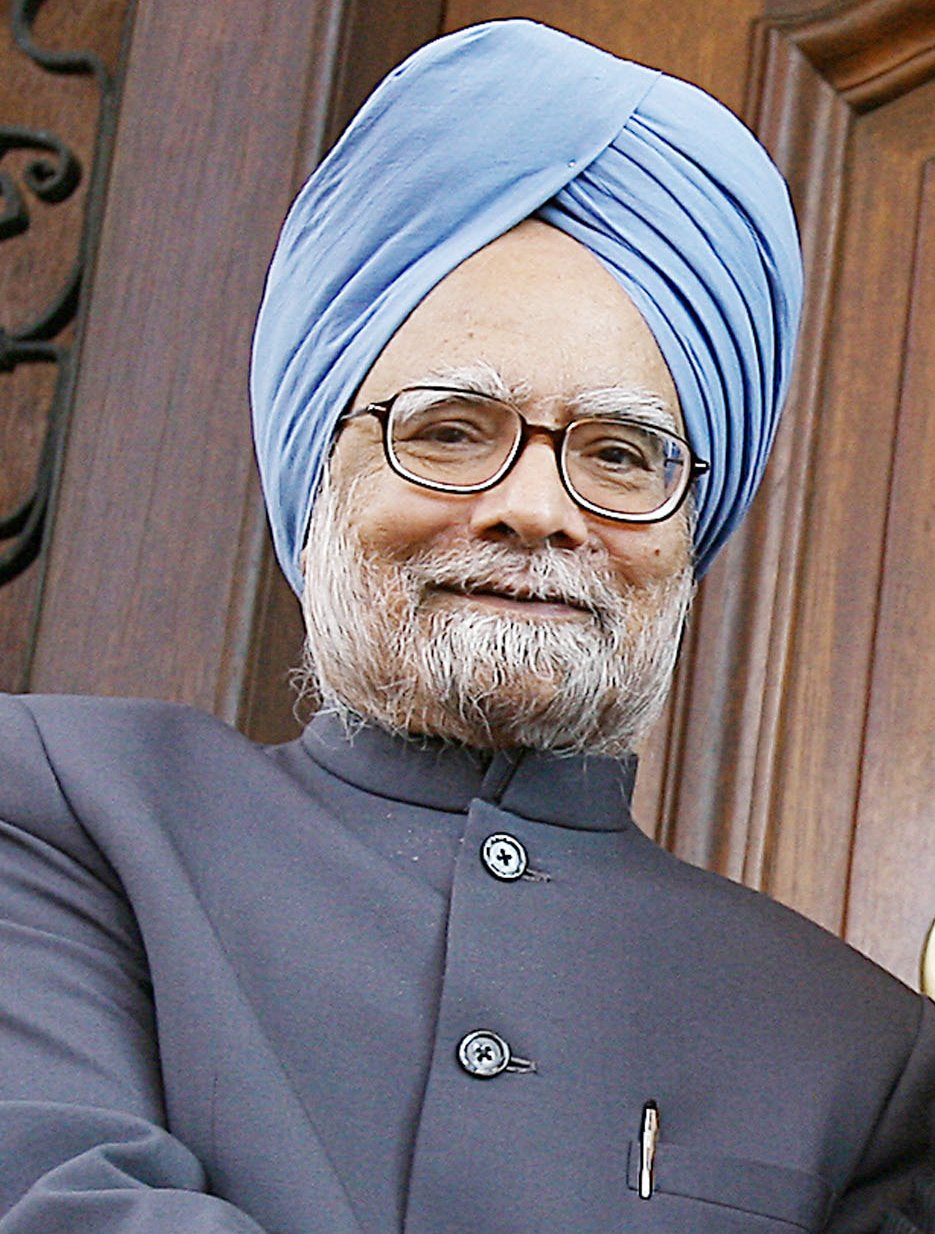

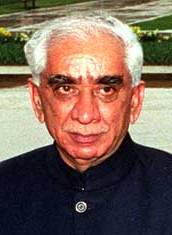
	First party	Second party
Leader	Manmohan Singh	Jaswant Singh
Party	INC	BJP

Rajya Sabha elections were held on various dates in 2009, to elect members of the Rajya Sabha, Indian Parliament's upper chamber. The elections were held to elect respectively four members from Jammu and Kashmir, three members from Kerala and one member from Pondicherry for the Council of States, the Rajya Sabha.

== Elections ==
Elections were held to elect members from states of J&K, KL, PY.

=== Members elected ===
The following members are elected in the elections held in 2009. They are members for the term 2009-2015 and retire in year 2015, except in case of the resignation or death before the term. The list is incomplete.

Member - Party - State

Rajya Sabha members for term 2009-2015
State	Member Name	Party	Remark
Jammu and Kashmir	Saifuddin Soz	INC	R
Jammu and Kashmir	Ghulam Nabi Azad	INC	
Jammu and Kashmir	G. N. Ratanpuri	JKNC	
Jammu and Kashmir	Mohammad Shafi	JKNC	
Kerala	M. P. Achuthan	CPM	
Kerala	P Rajeev	CPM	
Kerala	Vayalar Ravi	INC	
Puducherry	P. Kannan	INC	

=== Members retired ===
State - Member - Party

1. JK - S. Tarlok Singh - JKPDP
2. JK - Saifuddin Soz - INC
3. JK - Farooq Abdullah - JKNC
4. JK - Aslam Chowdhary Mohammad - JKPDP (members from J&K retired in Nov 2008 )
1. KL - K. Chandran Pillai - CPM
2. KL - Thennala Balakrishna Pillai - INC
3. KL - Vayalar Ravi - INC
1. PY - V. Narayanasamy - INC

== Bye-elections ==
The bye-elections were also held for the vacant seats from the State of Andhra Pradesh, Jharkhand and Uttar Pradesh, and Bihar.

- Bye-elections were held on 23 March 2009 for vacancy from Andhra Pradesh due to resignation of seating member C. Ramachandraiahon 22/01/2009 with term ending on 21/06/2010.N. Janardhana Reddy of INC became member since 01/04/2009.
- Bye-elections were held on 20 June 2009 for vacancy from Jharkhand and Uttar Pradesh due to resignations of seating member Digvijay Singh on 05/04/2009 with term ending on 07/07/2010 and seating member Banwari Lal Kanchhal on 23/04/2009 with term ending on 02/04/2012. From JH Dhiraj Prasad Sahu of INC and from UP Ganga Charan Rajput of BSP became the members.
- Bye-elections were held on 20 June 2009 for vacancy from Jharkhand and Uttar Pradesh due to elections of Lok Sabha of seating member Yashwant Sinha on 16/05/2009 with term ending on 07/07/2010 and seating member Murli Manohar Joshi on 23/04/2009 with term ending on 04/07/2010. From JH Hemant Soren of JMM and from UP Shriram Pal of BSP became the members.
- Bye-elections were held on 4 August 2009 for vacancy from Bihar due to elections of Lok Sabha of seating member Sharad Yadav of JDS on 13/05/2009 with term ending on 07/07/2010. From BH George Fernandes of JDS became the member.
- Bye-elections were held on 8 January 2010 for vacancy from Bihar due to death of seating member Mahendra Sahni of JDU on 06/11/2009 with term ending on 02/04/2012. Dr Anil Kumar Sahani of JDU became the member.
