= Champion R. Sangma =

Indian former police officer and militant leader

Champion R. Sangma (born Pakchara R. Sangma) is a former deputy superintendent of the Meghalaya Police who later founded the militant organisation Garo National Liberation Army (GNLA). After his arrest in India-Bangladesh border, Sangma was deported to India. Sangma also contested in the 2023 Meghalaya Legislative Assembly election from the Songsak constituency.

== Early life ==
Sangma is a Post graduate in Philosophy from North-Eastern Hill University of Shillong. He joined Meghalaya Police Service as a DSP in 2004, but was a probationary officer till 2009. In 2010, Meghalaya police confirmed that Sangma left the department with his service pistol without the department's knowledge.

== Militancy ==
Sangma founded a militant outfit named Garo National Liberation Army in 2009. Sangma's batchmates from North Eastern Police Academy stated that Sangma "neither showed a militant streak nor carried the impression of a good policeman in the making." After forming GNLA, Sangma became the Chairman of the outfit and included Sohan D Shira as Commander-in-chief, who was former '"Achik National Volunteer Council (ANVC)" commander.

== Arrest ==
Sangma was detained by Rapid Action Battalion in Mymensingh District from his hideout on 23 November 2011 and deported to Indian, where he was arrested on 30 July 2012 by Meghalaya police. On 21 February 2017, Sangma was released on bail but on 2 March he was against sent to judicial custody in connection with the kidnapping of a businessman in 2011. In March 2018 the Supreme Court of India ordered his release on bail, citing his right to a speedy trial under Article 21 of the Constitution of India.

On 22 February 2022 he was arrested by Assam Police in Guwahati on suspicion of possessing counterfeit currency.

== Political life ==
Sangma contested in the 2023 Meghalaya Legislative Assembly election from the Songsak constituency as an INC candidate but couldn't win. He later joined BJP leaving INC.
