= Tapati Guha-Thakurta =

Indian historian (born 1957)

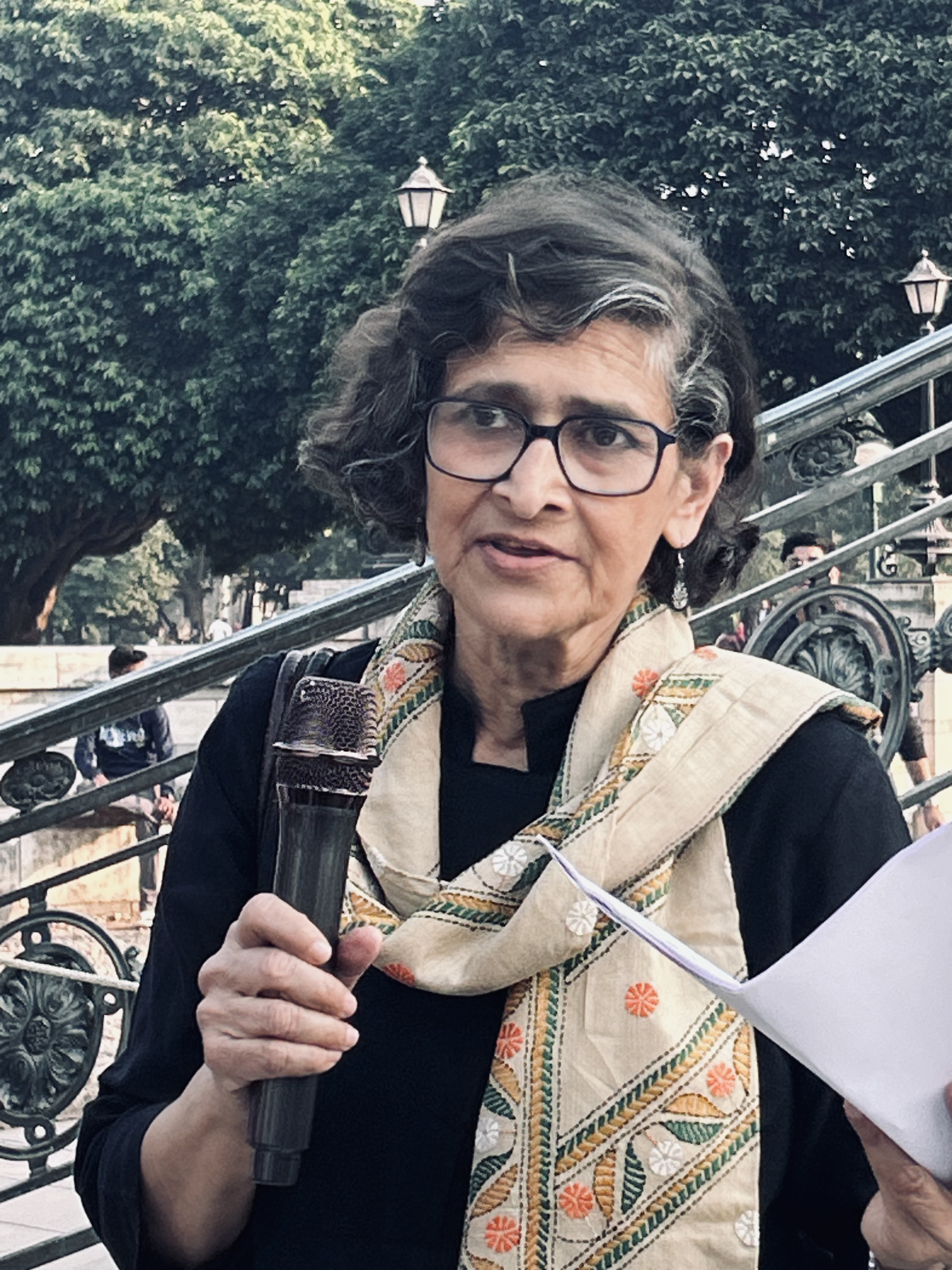
- Born: 27 September 1957 (age 69); Calcutta, India
- Occupations: Cultural historian, academic
- Known for: Art history, visual studies, cultural history of India
- Spouse: Hari Vasudevan (d. 2020)
- Relatives: Paranjoy Guha Thakurta (brother); Arundhati Devi (paternal aunt); Anindya Sinha (cousin)

Academic background
- Education: Presidency College, Kolkata; University of Oxford

Academic work
- Notable works: Monuments, Objects, Histories: Art in Colonial and Post–Colonial India; Making of a New 'Indian' Art: Artists, Aesthetics and Nationalism in Bengal

Tapati Guha-Thakurta (born 27 September 1957) is an Indian historian who has written about the cultural history and art of India. She is a director and professor in history at the Centre for Studies in Social Sciences, Calcutta, and was previously a professor at Presidency College, Kolkata. Her extensive research work on Kolkata's Durga Puja led to its inclusion in UNESCOs Intangible Cultural Heritage list.

== Biography ==
Guha-Thakurta was born in Calcutta and obtained a bachelor's and a master's degree in history from the Presidency College and Calcutta University. She finished her DPhil. at the University of Oxford. Guha-Thakurta was married to historian Hari Vasudevan, who died in May 2020 after contracting the COVID-19 virus.

== Career ==
In 1995, she was awarded the Charles Wallace Visiting Fellowship at Wolfson College, Cambridge. In 2011, she was a visiting fellow at the Yale Center for British Art. In 2018, she was a visiting professor at Brown University. She has written exhibition monographs and curated many art exhibitions. In 2019, she was assigned by the Indian Ministry of Culture to prepare a dossier proposing the inclusion of Durga Puja in the UNESCO Representative List of the Intangible Cultural Heritage of Humanity.

== Books ==
- Guha-Thakurta, Tapati (2007). The Making of a New 'Indian' Art: Artists, Aesthetics and Nationalism in Bengal, c.1850–1920. Cambridge University Press. ISBN 978-0521052733.
- Guha-Thakurta, Tapati (2004). Monuments, Objects, Histories: Art in Colonial and Post–Colonial India. Columbia University Press. ISBN 978-0231129985.
- Guha-Thakurta, Tapati (2015). In the Name of the Goddess: The Durga Pujas of Contemporary Kolkata. Primus Books. ISBN 978-9384082468.
