= Maulana Abul Kalam Azad Institute of Asian Studies =

Indian research institute

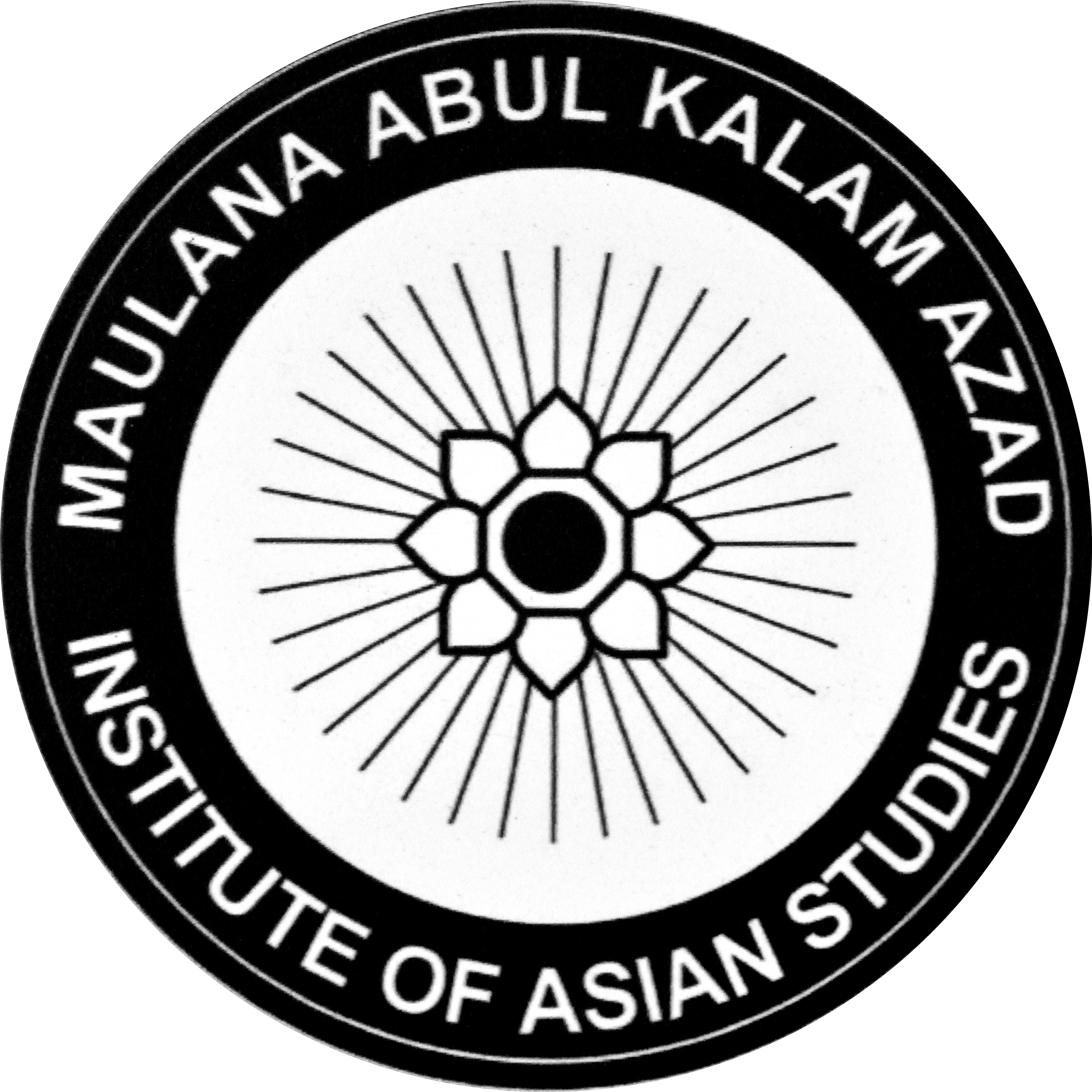
- Emblem of MAKAIAS
- Formation: 4 January 1993; 33 years ago
- Founders: Saiyid Nurul Hasan
- Type: Research Institute
- Headquarters: IB 166, Sector -III, Salt Lake, Kolkata-700106
- Location: Kolkata, India
- Coordinates: 22.5708981°N 88.4131176°E
- President: Governor of West Bengal
- Chairman: Radharaman Chakraborty
- Director: Sarup Prasad Ghosh
- Parent organisation: Ministry of Culture, Government of India
- Website: http://www.makaias.gov.in

The Maulana Abul Kalam Azad Institute of Asian Studies is an autonomous research institute based in Kolkata. It is funded by the Ministry of Culture of the Government of India. It was founded on 4 January 1993. The foundation stone of the institute was laid where the new building now stands on 12 March 1993. It is devoted to the study of the life and works of Maulana Abul Kalam Azad, the eminent nationalist leader and India's first education minister, after whom it is named, and to the furtherance of Area Studies, with special reference to South Asia, Central Asia and West Asia, especially dealing with social, cultural, economic, political and administrative developments in Asia from the nineteenth century to the present. M.Phil.- and Ph.D.-level students of the University of Calcutta, Jadavpur University and Jawaharlal Nehru University, New Delhi are also associated with it.

== History ==
With the start of the birth centenary celebrations of Maulana Abul Kalam Azad in 1989, the need for a research institute devoted to the study of his life and writings as well as area studies, especially to the research in secular Islam in Asian countries was felt by the governor of West Bengal, Nurul Hasan, who took the main initiative in founding this institute in Calcutta. He was the founder of this institute. It took a few years before such a plan could be fully implemented, and the foundation stone of the institute was laid on a newly acquired plot close to the Salt Lake stadium in Calcutta in 1993 by the then president of India, Shankar Dayal Sharma, in the presence of the then Human Resource Development Minister Arjun Singh, Nurul Hasan, the then Chief Minister of West Bengal, Jyoti Basu, the Deputy Chairperson of the Rajya Sabha, Najma Heptullah, and the then Minister for Higher Education of the Government of West Bengal, Satyasadhan Chakraborty. Barun De, formerly first Director, Centre for Studies in Social Sciences, Calcutta, was given the responsibility of organising the event.

Directors
- Barun De, 1993–1997
- B.P. Saha, 1998–1999
- Jayanta Kumar Ray, (acting), 1999–2000
- Mahavir Singh, 2000–2005
- Jayanta Kumar Ray, 2005–2007
- PHari Vasudevan, 2007–2011
- Sreeradha Dutta, 2011–2017
- Vinay Kumar Srivastava, 2017–2018
- Gayatri Maheshwari, 2018–2019
- Mundayat Sasikumar 2019
- Sarup Prasad Ghosh, 2019–present

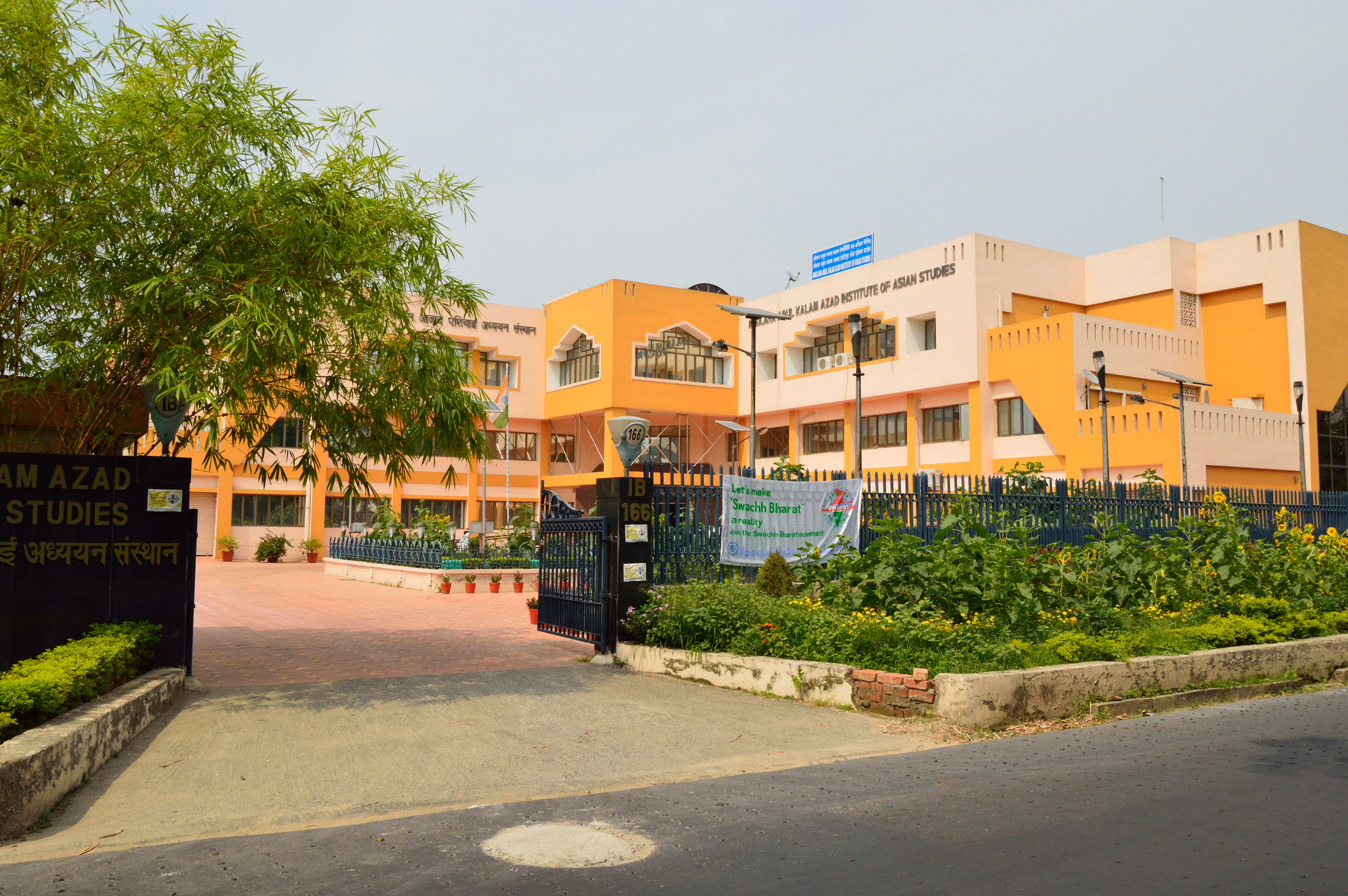
The Azad Bhavan, Maulana Abul Kalam Azad Institute of Asian Studies.

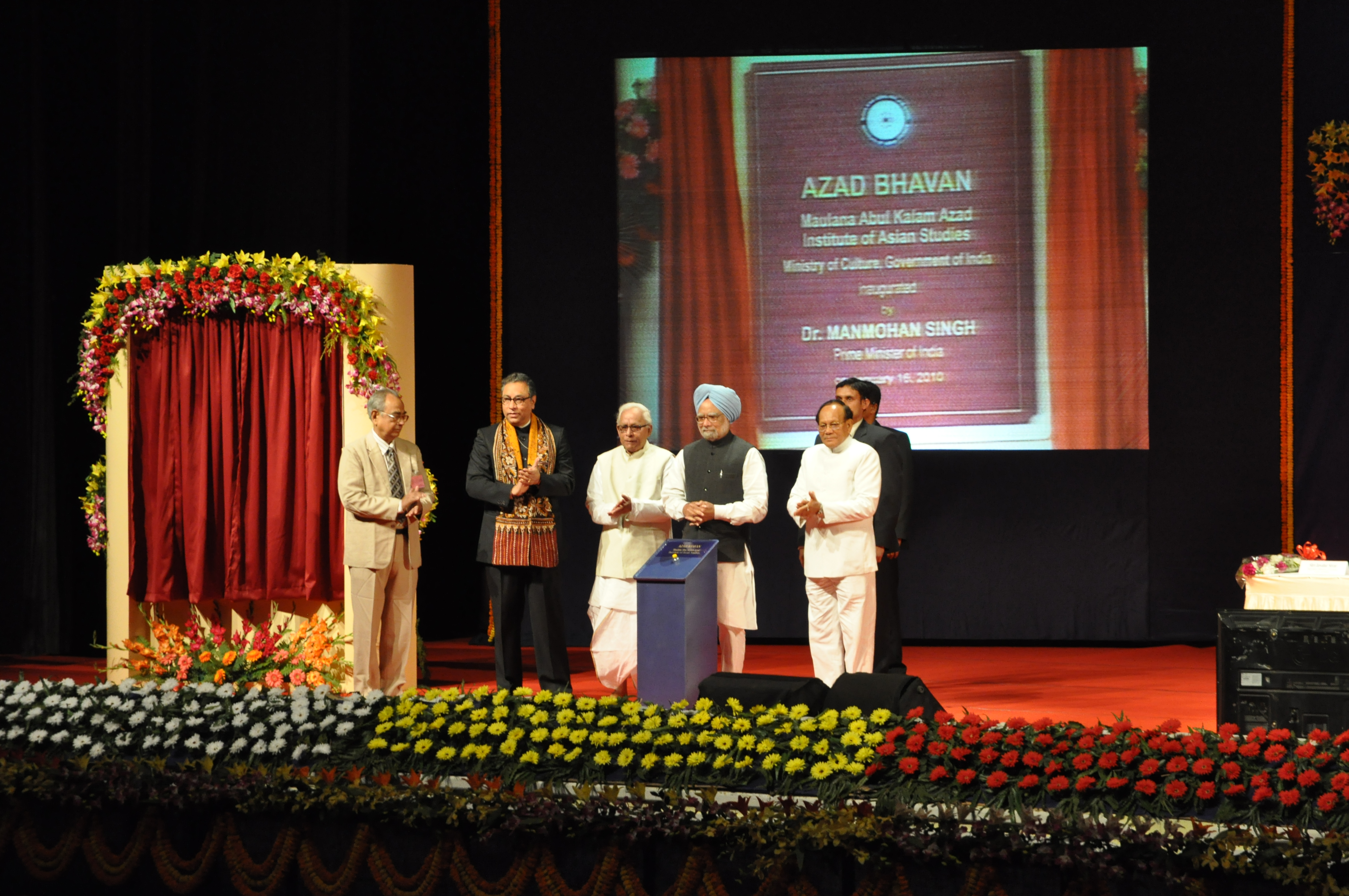
Inauguration of Azad Bhavan - Maulana Abul Kalam Azad Institute of Asian Studies by the Prime Minister of India Manmohan Singh at the Science City Auditorium – Kolkata

Nurul Hasan, was the founder-president of the institute's society and the executive council. Satish Chandra, formerly chairman, University Grants Commission, Delhi, was appointed as the first vice-chairman of the executive council, and Barun De was appointed as the first director of the institute.

At this time the former residence of Maulana Azad at 19, Ballygunge Circular Road, presently 5, Ashraf Mistry Lane (better known locally as Lovelock Lane off Ballygunge Circular Road), was handed over by the Government of West Bengal to the institute. It was meant house a museum. Soon the institute shifted to 567, Diamond Harbour Road, Calcutta, where it temporarily occupied two large floors of a rented house. Later, at the turn of the present century, it was shifted to Maulana Azad's house, where both the institute and its museum were located until 2010. A new building, named 'Azad Bhavan', has been subsequently built on the one-acre plot given to it in Salt Lake, where the institute has now been shifted. The museum will remain in Maulana Azad's house, now renamed Maulana Azad Museum.

== Academics ==
=== Institute ===
The institute organises seminars, conferences, symposia, workshops and a few annual lectures including Maulana Abul Kalam Azad Memorial Lectures and the Barun De Memorial Lecture.

=== Museum ===
The Maulana Azad Museum was inaugurated on 11 March 2006, in memory of the former education minister, at his former residence in Calcutta. The museum holds annual lectures and other cultural events.

== Administration ==
It is registered as a society under the West Bengal Registration of Societies Act, 1961. It is mainly financed by the Ministry of Culture of the Government of India. His Excellency, the Governor of West Bengal is the president of the society of the institute. Radharaman Chakraborty is the chairman of the institute. Sarup Prasad Ghosh is the institute's present director.

== Location ==
Maulana Azad's home is an example of twentieth-century colonial architecture. It is situated off the Ballygunge maidan and close to landmark buildings of the city. The location of the new building is also well-appointed, given its centrality in Salt Lake. It is close to other educational institutions, such as the Salt Lake campus of All India Institute of Hygiene and Public Health, Salt Lake campus of Indian Institute of Technology, Kharagpur, S. N. Bose National Centre for Basic Sciences, the Salt Lake campus of the University of Calcutta, the Salt Lake campus of Jadavpur University, NIFT Kolkata, Government College of Engineering and Leather Technology, and West Bengal National University of Juridical Sciences.

== Notable faculty ==
- Anisuzzaman, visiting fellow.
- Barun De, Maulana Azad Fellow.
- Jayanta Kumar Ray, Maulana Azad Fellow.
- Krishnan Srinivasan, Distinguished Fellow.

== See also ==
- Education in India
