= Hari Vasudevan =

Indian historian and writer (1952–2020)

Professor Hari Vasudevan
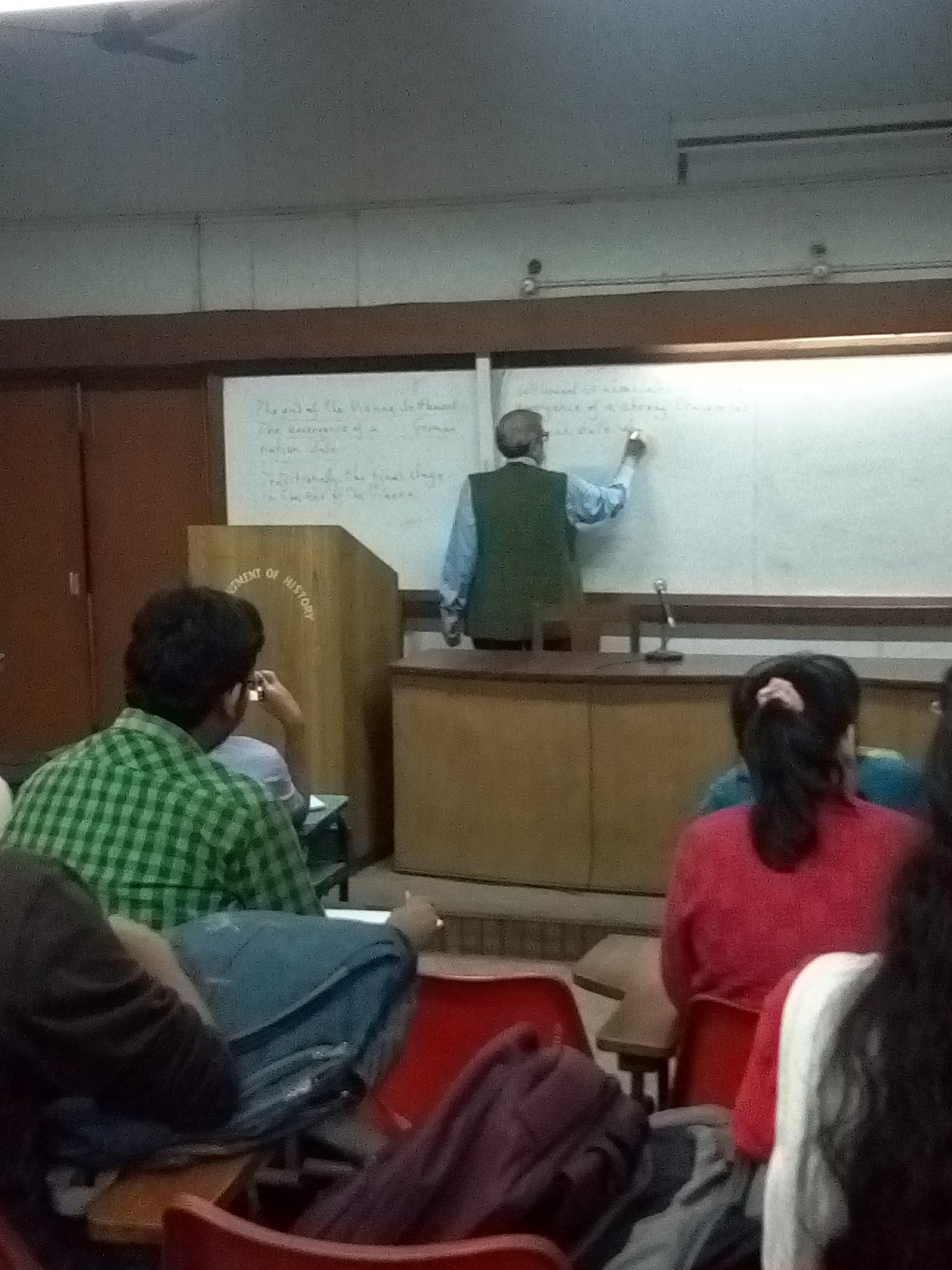
- Professor Vasudevan taking a class at the Dept. of Modern History, University of Calcutta, December 2017.
- Born: 15 February 1952; Kolkata, India
- Died: 10 May 2020 (aged 68); Kolkata, India
- Occupations: Historian; writer
- Spouse: Tapati Guha-Thakurta
- Children: 1
- Relatives: Ravi Vasudevan (brother)

Academic background
- Education: PhD
- Alma mater: University of Cambridge

Academic work
- Institutions: University of Calcutta; University Grants Commission; Maulana Abul Kalam Azad Institute of Asian Studies; Jamia Milia Islamia; The Asiatic Society; Cornell University; King's College London; Russian Academy of Sciences; Taras Shevchenko National University of Kyiv; Dagon University; National Council of Educational Research and Training
- Main interests: History of Europe; India–Russia relations; History of Russian; History of Central Asia

Hari Shankar Vasudevan (15 February 1952 – 10 May 2020) was an Indian historian, writer and emeritus professor. His work was primarily focused on history of Europe and India–Russia relations besides his contribution to the history of Russian and Central Asia. He served as the president of the Institute of Development Studies, Kolkata from July 2018 until he died in May 2020. His last publication was India and the October Revolution: Nationalist Revolutionaries, Bolshevik Power and Lord Curzon’s Nightmare, later published in multiple parts and volumes in the book titled The Global Impact of Russia’s Great War and Revolution (RGWR), and in its second book The Wider Arc of Revolution. It is also published in RGWR's second part titled Bloomington, Indiana: Slavica Publishers, 2019.

He was born around 1952 in Kolkata, India to Methil Vasudevan who was an aeronautical engineer at Defence Science Organisation (in modern-day Defence Research and Development Organisation). He did B.A. (Hons.) from Christ's College, Cambridge and then obtained his M.A. from University of Cambridge. He was married to an Indian historian, Tapati Guha-Thakurta, with whom he had a daughter, Mrinalini.

== Life ==
Hari Vasudevan's parents were Methil Vasudevan and Sreekumari Menon. His father Methil Vasudevan was a mechanical and aeronautical engineer. Hari Vasudevan grew up in India, Europe and Africa. After completing his PhD studies from University of Cambridge in 1978, he became a Reader in European History at University of Calcutta in 1978, later going on to become an emeritus professor at the University.

At Jamia Millia Islamia he set up the 'Central Asia' programme. He was part of numerous government committees, including the chairperson of the 'Textbook Development Committee for the Social Sciences' at the National Council of Educational Research and Training. From 2007 to 2011 he was the director of Maulana Abul Kalam Azad Institute of Asian Studies, under the Ministry of Culture. Vasudevan was involved in projects on India-Russia relations including ones with Gayatri Spivak of Columbia University. At the Observer Research Foundation he was studying India's Look East policy among other things. He taught at Russian Academy of Sciences, Kiev University, Uppsala University, Cornell University, King's College, London, Yunnan Normal University and Dagon University.

He authored 'Footsteps of Afanasii Nikitin: Travels through Eurasia and India in the early 21st century' in 2015 and 'Shadows of Substance: Indo-Russian Trade and Military Technical Cooperation' in 2010. He edited and co-authored numerous books. He married Tapati Guha-Thakurta and has a daughter. Tapati Guha-Thakurta is a director and professor in history at Centre for Studies in Social Sciences, Calcutta.

From 2005 to 2015, he served as a chairperson of the National Council of Educational Research and Training (NCERT) at Syllabus Committees and Textbook Development Committees for Social Sciences. Between 2006 and 2007, he served as a consultant for the Ministry of Commerce and Industry where his work was focused on India-Russian Trade.

He also served at several government of India's branches, including Ministry of Culture, Ministry of Education, and Ministry of External Affairs besides working at the Ministry of Commerce and Industries.

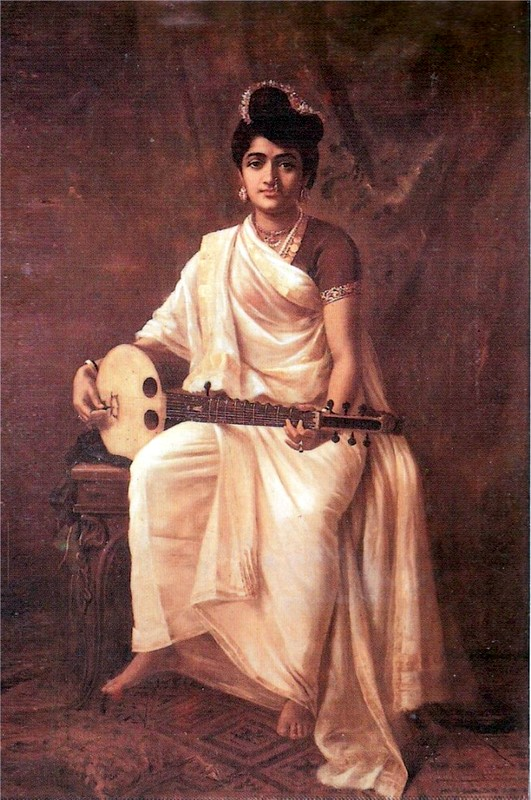
Oil painting by Raja Ravi Varma, depicting Malabar Lady

He also produced his work focused on Indian and Russian military cooperation. Some of his work revolves around early European and Afanasy Nikitin's trade in India during 15th century to the modern India. He along with his mother wrote a biography titled Memoirs of a Malabar Lady, consisting of a detailed account of her life.

== Death ==
He tested positive for COVID-19 during the COVID-19 pandemic in India on 6 May and was subsequently admitted to AMRI Hospitals for treatment, however he died in Calcutta hospital on 20 May 2020 after experiencing pyrexia and shortness of breath.
