= Nihim D. Shira =

Indian politician

Nihim D. Shira is an Indian politician and a member of the National People's Party. Shira served as a member of the Meghalaya Legislative Assembly from the Songsak constituency in East Garo Hillsfor two terms from 2008 to 2018.
