= 1987 Rajya Sabha elections =

Rajya Sabha elections were held on various dates in 1987, to elect members of the Rajya Sabha, Indian Parliament's upper chamber.

== Elections ==
Elections were held to elect members from various states.

=== Members elected ===
The following members are elected in the elections held in 1987. They are members for the term 1987-1993 and retire in year 1993, except in case of the resignation or death before the term. The list is incomplete.

State - Member - Party

Rajya Sabha members for term 1987-1993
State	Member Name	Party	Remark
Goa	John F Fernandez	INC	
Gujarat	P Shiv Shankar	INC	
Gujarat	Chhotubhai Sukhabhai Patel	INC	
Gujarat	Jitendrabhai L Bhatt	INC	
Sikkim	Khamsum Namgyal Pulger	SSP	res 01/03/1988
West Bengal	Sunil Basuray	CPM	
West Bengal	Tridib Chaudhuri	RSP	
West Bengal	Dipen Ghosh	CPM	
West Bengal	Ramnarayan Goswami	CPM	
West Bengal	Samar Mukherjee	CPM	
West Bengal	Dr R K Poddar	CPM	

== Bye-elections ==
The following bye elections were held in the year 1987.

State - Member - Party

1. Nagaland - S. C. Jamir - INC ( ele 02/07/1987 term till 1992 ) res 02/02/1989 CM, NG
2. Haryana - Om Prakash Chautala - JD ( ele 14/08/1987 term till 1990 )
3. Andhra pradesh - M K Rehman - TDP ( ele 05/10/1987 term till 1988 )
