= 1971 Rajya Sabha elections =

Elections for the Upper House of Indian Parliament

Rajya Sabha elections were held on various dates in 1971, to elect members of the Rajya Sabha, Indian Parliament's upper chamber.

== Elections ==
Elections were held to elect members from various states.

=== Members elected ===
The following members are elected in the elections held in 1971. They are members for the term 1971-1977 and retire in year 1977, except in case of the resignation or death before the term. The list is incomplete.

State - Member - Party

Rajya Sabha members for term 1971-1977
State	Member Name	Party	Remark
Kerala	--	CPM	R

== Bye-elections ==
The following bye elections were held in the year 1971.

State - Member - Party

1. Orissa - Biju Patnaik - JD ( ele 13/05/1971 term till 1972 ) res 06/10/1971
2. Maharashtra - V. N. Gadgil - INC ( ele 06/05/1971 term till 1976 )
3. Bihar - Bideshwari Prasad Singh - INC ( ele 13/05/1971 term till 1974 )
4. Bihar - D.P. Singh - INC ( ele 17/06/1971 term till 1972 )
5. Bihar - Sitaram Kesari - INC ( ele 02/07/1971 term till 1974 )
6. Tamil Nadu - M Kamalanathan - DMK ( ele 29/07/1971 term till 1972 )
7. Maharashtra - Sushila S Adivarekar - INC ( ele 18/09/1971 term till 1972 )
8. Uttar Pradesh - Prof Saiyid Nurul Hasan - INC ( ele 11/11/1971 term till 1972 )
9. Nominated - Dr Vidya Prakash Dutt - NOM ( ele 04/12/1971 term till 1974 )
