= 1963 Rajya Sabha elections =

Elections for the Upper House of Indian Parliament

Rajya Sabha elections were held on various dates in 1963, to elect members of the Rajya Sabha, Indian Parliament's upper chamber.

== Elections ==
Elections were held to elect members from various states.

=== Members elected ===
The following members are elected in the elections held in 1963. They are members for the term 1963-1969 and retire in year 1969, except in case of the resignation or death before the term. The list is incomplete.

State - Member - Party

Rajya Sabha members for term 1963-1969
State	Member Name	Party	Remark
Puducherry	P Abraham	INC	R

== Bye-elections ==
The following bye elections were held in the year 1963.

State - Member - Party

1. Maharashtra -Y B Chavan - INC ( ele 021/02/1963 term till 1966 ) res. 21/12/1963
2. Madras - T Chengalvaroyan - INC ( ele 09/08/1963 term till 1966 )
3. West Bengal - R K Bhuwalka - OTH ( ele 09/09/1963 term till 1968)
4. Rajasthan - Sharda Bhargava - INC ( ele 22/08/1963 term till 1966 )
5. Uttar Pradesh - Shyam Kumari Khan - INC ( ele 11/12/1963 term till 1966 )
6. Uttar Pradesh - Joginder Singh - INC ( ele 11/12/1963 term till 1966 )
7. Uttar Pradesh - Col B H Zaidi - INC ( ele 11/12/1963 term till 1964 )
