= L. G. Havanur =

Indian politician (1927–2006)

L. G. Havanur (March 1927 – 15 September 2006) was the former Law Minister in the Devaraj Urs government of Karnataka, India during 1982-80. Havanur headed the Backward Classes Commission set up by the Devaraj Urs government in the mid-1970s and authored Karnataka's Backward Classes Report. It is believed that his report was extensively referred to for the drafting of the Mandal Commission Report.

== Early life ==
Laxman Havanur was born to Gulappa and Durga Devi Havanur in Ranebennur district Haveri on 24 March 1927. While in school he demonstrated a talent for painting and was sent to the J.J. School of Arts in Mumbai by the principal. He then went on to do a degree in law.

== Career ==
Havanur began his career as an advocate in the then Mysore State High Court and the Supreme Court of India. He practiced law as a senior advocate until his death in 2006.

=== Havanur Report ===
The Backward Classes Report, also called the Havanur Report, was submitted to the Karnataka Government on 19 November 1975. Soon after, Havanur was inducted into the Devaraj Urs Ministry and played a major role in the implementation of the report.

The report profiles, classifies and favours reservation for backward classes. It also lays down guidelines for the apportionment of the reservation for the various backward classes in India. The Havanur Report was instrumental in constituting a reservation policy to be implemented in government organisations, educational and other institutions.

Devaraj Urs, the then Chief Minister of Karnataka was so impressed by Havanur's report that he called it the "Bible of Backward Classes". The Supreme Court of India also praised the report as a comprehensive scientific study of the Backward Classes.

Havanur's work provided impetus for politicians from the backward classes to achieve greater success in the political arena for prominent politicians from Backward classes like Sarekoppa Bangarappa - (Ediga community) and Veerappa Moily- Devdiga( community:(Kshaurika, volaga oodavaru-Barber community).

Havanur was not inclined to politics but was compelled to join politics because of the popularity that ensued after the submission of his report on backward classes. He was a legal luminary and a social reformer who used his legal prowess for the upliftment of backward classes in other ways with a great sense of commitment.

Havanur founded the Socio-Legal Services and Research Foundation in 1979 to provide legal assistance to socially backward communities. The Havanur College of Law is also managed by the foundation.

In 1991, Havanur was invited as an advisor to the Constitutional Advisory Committee of South Africa to draft the country's constitution.

== Death ==
Havanur died in Bangalore on 15 September 2006. He is survived by his wife, four daughters and three sons.
