= 1955 Rajya Sabha elections =

Elections for the Upper House of Indian Parliament

Rajya Sabha elections were held on various dates in 1955, to elect members of the Rajya Sabha, Indian Parliament's upper chamber.

== Elections ==
Elections were held to elect members from various states.

=== Members elected ===
The following members are elected in the elections held in 1955. They are members for the term 1955-1961 and retire in year 1961, except in case of the resignation or death before the term. The list is incomplete.

State - Member - Party

Rajya Sabha members for term 1955-1961
State	Member Name	Party	Remark
Nominated	[[]]	NOM	

== Bye-elections ==
The following bye elections were held in the year 1955.

State - Member - Party

1. Andhra - T J M Wilson - INC ( ele 07/07/1955 term till 1958 )
2. Delhi - Mehr Chand Khanna - INC ( ele 13/05/1955 term till 1958 )res 14/12/1956
3. Uttar Pradesh - Govind Ballabh Pant - INC ( ele 02/03/1955 term till 1958 )
