= 1969 Rajya Sabha elections =

Elections for the Upper House of Indian Parliament

Rajya Sabha elections were held on various dates in 1969, to elect members of the Rajya Sabha, Indian Parliament's upper chamber.

== Elections ==
Elections were held to elect members from various states.

=== Members elected ===
The following members are elected in the elections held in 1969. They are members for the term 1969-1975 and retire in year 1975, except in case of the resignation or death before the term. The list is incomplete.

State - Member - Party

Rajya Sabha members for term 1969-1975
State	Member Name	Party	Remark
Puducherry	S Sivaprakasam	DMK	
West Bengal	Kalyan Roy	CPI	
West Bengal	Niren Ghosh	CPM	
West Bengal	Prof D P Chattopadhyaya	INC	
West Bengal	Pranab Mukherjee	BC	
West Bengal	Choudhary Suhid Mullick	FB	
West Bengal	Monoranjan Roy	CPM	

== Bye-elections ==
The following bye elections were held in the year 1969.

State - Member - Party

1. Andhra Pradesh - M Anandam - INC ( ele 11/03/1969 term till 1974 )
2. Madhya Pradesh - D K Jadhav - INC ( ele 25/03/1969 term till 1970 )
3. Punjab - Gurcharan Singh Tohra - SAD ( ele 28/03/1969 term till 1970 )
4. Punjab - Harcharan Singh Duggal - OTH ( ele 28/03/1969 term till 1970 )
5. Madhya Pradesh - Sawai Singh Sisodia - INC ( ele 28/04/1969 term till 1970 )
6. Uttar Pradesh - Phool Singh - INC ( ele 11/08/1969 term till 1972 ) dea 27/09/1970
7. Uttar Pradesh - Mohan Lal Gautam - INC ( ele 14/08/1969 term till 1972 )
8. TN - K Kalyanasudaram - DMK ( ele 23/09/1969 term till 1970 )
9. Uttar Pradesh - Jagdish Chandra Dikshit - INC ( ele 23/09/1969 term till 1970 )
