= P. N. Rajbhoj =

Indian politician (1905–1984)

Pandurang Nathuji Rajabhoj (15 March 1905 – 23 July 1984) was an Indian politician and represent Bombay State in Rajya Sabha during 1957–62.

He was close aide of Dr Ambedkar.But serious differences emerged between them. He was general secretary of All India Scheduled Castes Federation formed by Dr. B. R. Ambedkar in 1942. He resigned from SCF in April 1955. Later on 15 August 1955, Rajbhoj joined congress.

In 1951-52 Rajbhoj won the parliament seat from Solapur, Maharashtra as Scheduled caste federation (SCF) candidate. While Dr Ambedkar lost the election as SCF party candidate to Narayan sadoba Karjolar from Mumbai North Central constituency. However, after resignation from SCF, he became member of Rajya Sabha from congress in 1957.

He wrote book Lashkari Pesha in Marathi. He died in 1984 and had two sons and two daughter.
