= 1965 Rajya Sabha elections =

Rajya Sabha elections were held on various dates in 1965, to elect members of the Rajya Sabha, Indian Parliament's upper chamber.

== Elections ==
Elections were held to elect members from various states.

=== Members elected ===
The following members are elected in the elections held in 1965. They are members for the term 1965–1971 and retire in year 1971, except in case of the resignation or death before the term. The list is incomplete.

State - Member - Party

Rajya Sabha members for term 1965–1971
State	Member Name	Party	Remark
Jammu and Kashmir	M Shafi Quershi	OTH	res 23/01/1967 4LS
Orissa	Shraddhakar Supakar	INC	26/02/1967

== Bye-elections ==
The following bye elections were held in the year 1965.

State - Member - Party

1. UP - Tribhuvan Narain Singh - CO ( ele 08/01/1965 term till 1970 )
2. Madras - G Lalitha Rajgopalan - INC ( ele 13/01/1965 term till 1970 )
3. Manipur - Sinam Krishnamohan Singh - INC ( ele 13/01/1965 term till 1966 )
4. Rajasthan - Jagannath_Pahadia - INC ( ele 02/03/1965 term till 1966 )21/03/1966
5. WB - Debabrata Mookerjee - OTH ( ele 04/11/1965 term till 1968 )
