= Kalyan Roy =

Indian politician (1929-1985)

Kalyan Roy MP

Member of Parliament, Rajya Sabha
- In office 10 July 1969 – 31 January 1985
- Succeeded by: Gurudas Dasgupta
- Constituency: West Bengal

Personal details
- Born: 27 December 1929 Calcutta, Bengal Presidency, British India
- Died: 31 January 1985 (aged 55) Calcutta, West Bengal, India
- Party: Communist Party of India
- Spouse: Purabi Roy (m. 1975)
- Parents: Kiran Shankar Roy (father); Padma Roy (mother)
- Education: Presidency College, Calcutta (BA); Syracuse University (MA)

Kalyan Roy, also credited as Kalyan Shankar Roy (Bengali: কল্যাণ রায়; 27 December 1929 - 31 January 1985) was an Indian politician and a leader of Communist Party of India and also a leader of All India Trade Union Congress. A trade union leaders of Asansol-Raniganj coalfield area, Kalyan Roy was one of the senior CPI leader and parliamentarian in Rajya Sabha.

== Family background and education ==
Kalyan Shankar Roy was born to Kiran Shankar Roy and Padma Roy (née Roy Chowdhury) on 27 December 1929 in Calcutta, India. Kiran Shankar Roy was a freedom fighter, Congress leader and former Home Minister of West Bengal immediately after India's independence.

== Political Life ==
Since the end of 1945, many changes took place when the leadership of the Indian Trade Union movement had fallen to the Communists and the followers of M.N.Roy. In 1946 Trade Union membership tripled and the Congress party, leader of Trade Union movement in the early twenties, was in a dominating position. After 7 years in 1953, according to the Lok Sabha speech of Deputy labour Minister Abid Ali, then in India 4 Trade Unions: INTUC, AITUC, HMS and UTUC had a major influence on the workers. At that time, Colliery Mazdoor Sabha and Indian Mine Workers Federation led by AITUC leader Kalyan Roy, had a stronghold in India's oldest coal belt in Raniganj area.

Bengali Bhadralok Pranab Mukherjee, an active Congress leader in the 1970s and senior communist leaders like Kalyan Ray shared a close association though their ideological views were different.

Kalyan Roy was elected in the year 1969, 1975 and 1982 Rajya Sabha elections as a CPI leader from West Bengal.

Coal Belt Review 1958- General Secretary of Indian Mine Workers’ Federation, Kalyan Roy expressed his views in his article, Coal Belt in 1958—A Review for the 'Crisis and Workers Report to AITUC General Council' in 1959. He ended the article by saying, "both the Indian Mine Workers Federation and the Indian National Mine Workers Federation have come out with more or less similar demands. The conferences of the iMWF at Bhurkunda and inmwf at Dhanbad have raised the slogans of: Nationalisation of Mines, Wage Board for Coal Industry, Abolition of Contract labour; Gratuity and change in the present Bonus Act."

Coal Mine Nationalization (The Mines (Amendment) Bill, 1972)- Kalyan Roy was a member of a 45-member joint parliamentary committee, Government of India. The committee consists of 30 members from Lok Sabha and 15 from Rajya Sabha. After the twenty-sixth sitting on 27 August 1973, the committee's report was tabled in Rajya Sabha on 30 August 1973. Kalyan Roy was a fierce advocate for the nationalization of coal mines and later exposed "slaughter mining" practices by private contractors in the Hazaribagh and Giridih districts. The government of India nationalized coal mining in phases – cooking coal mines in 1971–72 and non-coking coal mines in 1973, all coal mines in India were nationalized in May 1973. On the occasion of the 29th session of AITUC, in an article, Roy addressed the gloomy situation of coal workers and collieries at Asansol-Raniganj coal belt before the Coal Mines (Nationalization) Act, of 1973. On 1 November 1975, the public-sector company Coal India Limited was formed to enable better organizational and operational efficiency in coal sector of India.

Chasnala Mining Disaster 1975 - Indira Gandhi declared The Emergency on 25 June 1975. The coal miners across the country faced the worst workable conditions led to the Chasnala mining disaster on 27 December 1975. 375 miners were killed in the disaster. The miners blamed The Indian Iron and Steel Company (IISCO) the then-owner of Chasnala Colliery for mismanagement and negligence. The Indian Iron and Steel Company (IISCO) claimed that International standards are maintained in Chasnala Colliery.

Corruption in IISCO Rajya Sabha Debate 1976 - Roy played a central role in exposing rampant corruption within the Indian Iron and Steel Company (IISCO) at Burnpur, directly questioning the Minister of Steel and Mines about payments to corrupt contractors.

On 16 January 1976 in a debate titled corruption in The Indian Iron and Steel Company (IISCO) in West Bengal, Rajya Sabha MP Kalyan Roy asked the Union Minister of Steel and Mines that whether he knows the rampant corruption in the Indian Iron and Steel Company at Burnpur and Kulti in West Bengal; Roy also asked the Minister what administrative measures have been taken to stop this corruption? what steps have been taken so far against the corrupt officers and contractors? and what is the amount of money paid to each of the contractors in Burnpur and Kulti as .well as in Chasnala and Jitpur coal mines in 1974 and 1975?

According to the former journalist and political commentator Rajeev Shukla, Roy was one of the very few leaders who set a benchmark for the institution as a parliamentarian.

== Death ==
Roy died in Calcutta on 31 January 1985 when he was only 55 years old. Gurudas Dasgupta was elected to the Rajya Sabha in the vacancy caused by the death of Kalyan Roy.

Roy was then a sitting member of Rajya Sabha when on 31 January 1985, after the House passed the Constitution (Fifty-second Amendment) Bill, 1985, the Deputy Chairman, Najma Heptulla announced the death of Kalyan Roy at Kolkata and made obituary references about him.
