= 1983 Rajya Sabha elections =

Rajya Sabha elections were held on various dates in 1983, to elect members of the Rajya Sabha, Indian Parliament's upper chamber.

== Elections ==
Elections were held to elect members from various states.

=== Members elected ===
The following members are elected in the elections held in 1983. They are members for the term 1983-1989 and retire in year 1989, except in case of the resignation or death before the term. The list is incomplete.

State - Member - Party

Rajya Sabha members for term 1983–1989
State	Member Name	Party	Remark
Assam	Islam Baharul	INC	R
Assam	Dharanidhar Basumatari	INC	
Delhi	Laxmi Narain	INC	
Delhi	Shamim Ahmed Siddiqui	INC	
Tamil Nadu	Aladi Aruna	AIADMK	R
Tamil Nadu	G K Moopanar	INC	Res 02/02/1989
Tamil Nadu	Murasoli Maran	DMK	
Tamil Nadu	M Kadharsha	AIADMK	
Tamil Nadu	R Mohanarangam	AIADMK	
Tamil Nadu	E Sambasivam	AIADMK	
Tamil Nadu	G Varadrajan	AIADMK	

== Bye-elections ==
The following bye elections were held in the year 1983.

State - Member - Party

1. Haryana - Chand Ram - INC ( ele 12/03/1983 term till 1984 )
2. Gujarat - Irshad Baig Mirza - INC ( ele 21/03/1983 term till 1984 )
3. Bihar - Chandan K Bagchi - INC ( ele 12/04/1983 term till 1984 )
4. Uttar Pradesh -- V P Singh—JD ( ele 23/07/1983 term till 1988 )
5. Karnataka -- Sarojini Mahishi—JAN ( ele 08/09/1983 term till 1984 )
