= Vidya Prakash Dutt =

Indian politician

Member of Parliament, Rajya Sabha for Nominated
- In office 1971–1980

Personal details
- Born: 25 June 1925
- Died: 26 April 2011 (aged 85)
- Party: Bharatiya Janata Party
- Parents: Krishna Gopal Dutt (father); Gargi Dutt (mother)

Vidya Prakash Dutt (25 June 1925 – 26 April 2011) was an Indian educationist and politician.

Dutt was the Vice-Chancellor of the University of Delhi and the author of a number of books. He was nominated to the Rajya Sabha in 1971 and served till 1974 and again from 1974 to 1980. Dutt's wife, Gargi, predeceased him in 2010. He died from a brief illness on 26 April 2011, at the age of 85. He was survived by a son and a daughter, both of whom are lawyers.

== Sources ==
- Brief Biodata
