= M. P. Achuthan =

Indian politician

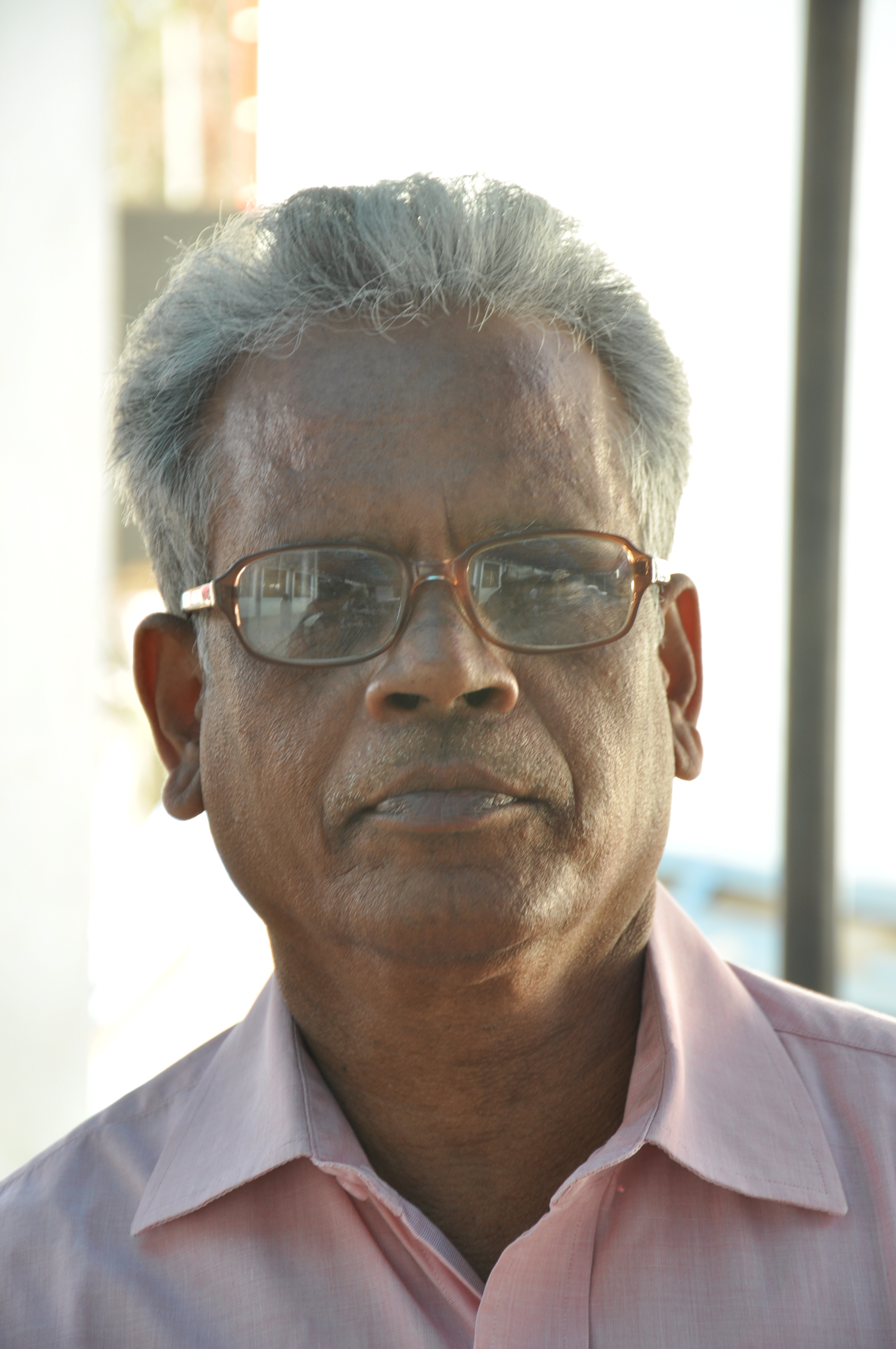
M P Achuthan

M P Achuthan (born 8 January 1949 in Vaikkalassery, Kozhikode district) is an Indian politician who, from 2009 to 2015, represented Kerala in the Rajya Sabha as a member of the Communist Party of India.
