= 1961 Rajya Sabha elections =

Elections for the Upper House of Indian Parliament

Rajya Sabha elections were held on various dates in 1961, to elect members of the Rajya Sabha, Indian Parliament's upper chamber.

== Elections ==
Elections were held to elect members from various states.

=== Members elected ===
The following members are elected in the elections held in 1961. They are members for the term 1961-1967 and retire in year 1967, except in case of the resignation or death before the term. The list is incomplete.

State - Member - Party

Rajya Sabha members for term 1961-1967
State	Member Name	Party	Remark
Nominated	V T Krishnamachari	NOM	dea 13/02/1964

== Bye-elections ==
The following bye elections were held in the year 1961.

State - Member - Party

1. Mysore - M Sherkhan - INC ( ele 09/03/1961 term till 1964 )
2. Uttar Pradesh - Uma Shankar Dikshit - INC ( ele 26/04/1961 term till 1964 )
3. Uttar Pradesh - A C Gilbert - INC ( ele 27/04/1961 term till 1962 )
4. Uttar Pradesh - Shanti Devi - OTH ( ele 27/04/1961 term till 1962 )
5. Jammu & Kashmir - Haqim Ali Khawja - OTH ( ele 22/08/1961 term till 1962 )
6. Madhya Pradesh - P C Sethi - INC ( ele 29/08/1961 term till 1964 )
7. Orissa - Dhananjoy Mohanty - INC ( ele 22/08/1961 term till 1964 )
8. Orissa - Bhabani Charan Pattanayak - INC ( ele 29/08/1961 term till 1966 )
9. Bihar - Mohammad Chaudhary A - INC ( ele 22/09/1961 term till 1964 )
10. West Bengal - M Ishaque - INC ( ele 29/12/1961 term till 1964 )
