= Bhubananda Das =

Indian politician

Member of Parliament, Rajya Sabha
- In office 1957-1958
- Constituency: Odisha

Member of Parliament, Lok Sabha
- In office 1952-1957
- Constituency: Jajpur

Personal details
- Born: 14 May 1885 Kurinjipur, Puri district, Odisha, British India
- Died: 24 February 1958 (age 72)
- Party: Indian National Congress
- Spouse: Rukmini Devi

Bhubananda Das was an Indian politician. He was a Member of Parliament, representing Odisha in the Rajya Sabha the upper house of India's Parliament as a member of the Indian National Congress.
