= 1953 Rajya Sabha elections =

Elections for the Upper House of Indian Parliament

- 17 March 1953 (1 seat); 26 May 1953 (1 seat) 16 November 1953 (1 seat) 30 November 1953 (4 seats)

7 (of 228 seats) to the Rajya Sabha 115 seats needed for a majority
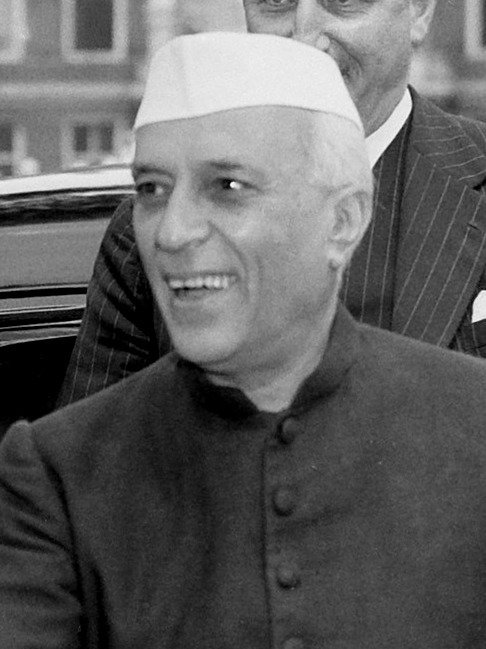
	First party	Second party
		CPI
Leader	Jawaharlal Nehru
Party	INC	CPI
Seats won	169	9
Seat change	▲1	▲1
Percentage	74.12%	3.95%
Swing	▼0.22%	▲0.41%

Rajya Sabha elections were held on various dates in 1953, to elect members of the Rajya Sabha, Indian Parliament's upper chamber.

== Elections ==
Elections were held to elect members from various states.

=== Members elected ===
The following members are elected in the elections held in 1953. They are members for the term 1953-1959 and retire in year 1959, except in case of the resignation or death before the term. The list is incomplete.

State - Member - Party

Rajya Sabha members for term 1953-1959
State	Member Name	Party	Remark
Nominated		NOM	

== By-elections ==
The following by-elections were held in the year 1953.

State - Member - Party

Rajya Sabha members for term 1952-1956
State	Member Name	Party	Remark
Punjab	Hans Raj Raizada	Indian National Congress	Elected 17/03/1953
Madras	V. K. Krishna Menon	Indian National Congress	Elected 26/05/1953
Nominated	Dr P V Kane	Nominated	Elected 16/11/1953
Andhra	N. D. M. Prasad Rao	Communist Party of India	Elected 30/11/1953
Andhra	Alluri Satyanarayana Raju	Indian National Congress	Elected 30/11/1953
Andhra	A. Balarami Reddy	Indian National Congress	Elected 30/11/1953
Andhra	Villuri Venkataramana	Indian National Congress	Elected 30/11/1953
