= 1995 Rajya Sabha elections =

Elections for the Upper House of Indian Parliament

Rajya Sabha elections were held in 1995, to elect members of the Rajya Sabha, Indian Parliament's upper chamber. 2 members from Assam and 6 members from Tamil Nadu were elected.

== Elections ==
Elections were held in 1995 to elect members from various states. The list is incomplete.

=== Members elected ===
The following members are elected in the elections held in 1995. They are members for the term 1995-2001 and retire in year 2001, except in case of the resignation or death before the term.

State - Member - Party

Rajya Sabha members for term 1995-2001
State	Member Name	Party	Remark
Assam	Dr Manmohan Singh	INC	R
Assam	Joyasree Goswami Mahanta	AGP	bye 24/08/1999
Assam	Parag Chaliha	AGP	dea 22/06/1999
Tamil Nadu	N. Rajendran	DMK	
Tamil Nadu	V. P. Duraisamy	DMK	bye 26/11/1996
Tamil Nadu	V. P. Duraisamy	AIADMK	res 10/10/1996
Tamil Nadu	O. S. Manian	AIADMK	
Tamil Nadu	Dr D. Masthan	AIADMK	
Tamil Nadu	R. Margabandhu	AIADMK	
Tamil Nadu	G K Moopanar	INC	res 09/09/1997
Tamil Nadu	Jayanti Natarajan	TMC	bye 10/10/1997

== Bye-elections ==
The following bye elections were held in the year 1995.

State - Member - Party

1. Andhra Pradesh - Dr Mohan Babu - TDP ( ele 18/04/1995 term till 2000 )
2. Kerala - Joy Nadukkara - OTH ( ele 27/10/1995 term till 1997 )
3. Kerala - K. Karunakaran - INC ( ele 25/04/1995 term till 1997 )
