= Tara Chand (archaeologist) =

Indian archeologist and politician

Tara Chand (17 June 1888 at Sialkot – 14 October 1973) was an Indian archaeologist and historian specialising in the ancient history and culture of India. He taught at Allahabad University and served as vice-chancellor in the 1940s.

== Career ==
Chand graduated with a D.Phil. from Queen's College, Oxford, in 1922 with a thesis on "The influence of Islam on Indian culture". Chand later went on to serve as the ambassador of India to Iran, and as Education Advisor within the Government of India.

He was appointed ambassador to Iran from 1951 to 1956, where he was succeeded by Badruddin Tyabji. On 22 August 1957, he was elected as a member of the Rajya Sabha and held the position till, 2 April 1968.

== Personal life ==
Chand was the son of Munshi Kripa Narain. He had one son and one daughter.

== Publications ==
- Chand, Tara (1922). Influence of Islam on Indian Culture. Read Books. ISBN 9781406730401.
- Chand, Tara (1966). Material and ideological factors in Indian history. University of Allahabad. Archived from the original on 28 February 2014.
- Chand, Tara (1967). History of the Freedom Movement in India. Publications Division, Ministry of Information and Broadcasting.
- Chand, Tara (1979). Society and State in the Mughal Period. Book Traders.

== Legacy ==
Allahabad University established the Dr. Tara Chand hostel in Chand's memory. The University Alumni Association grants an annual scholarship in his name. Tarachand Gold Medal for History is awarded in his name. Tarachand Gold Medal was awarded to Chandrarekha Mantri for obtaining highest number of marks in history at the All India Higher Secondary Examination of Central Board of Secondary Education held in 1973.
