= 2001 Rajya Sabha elections =

Elections for the upper house of Indian Parliament

(of 228 seats) to the Rajya Sabha
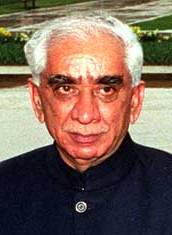

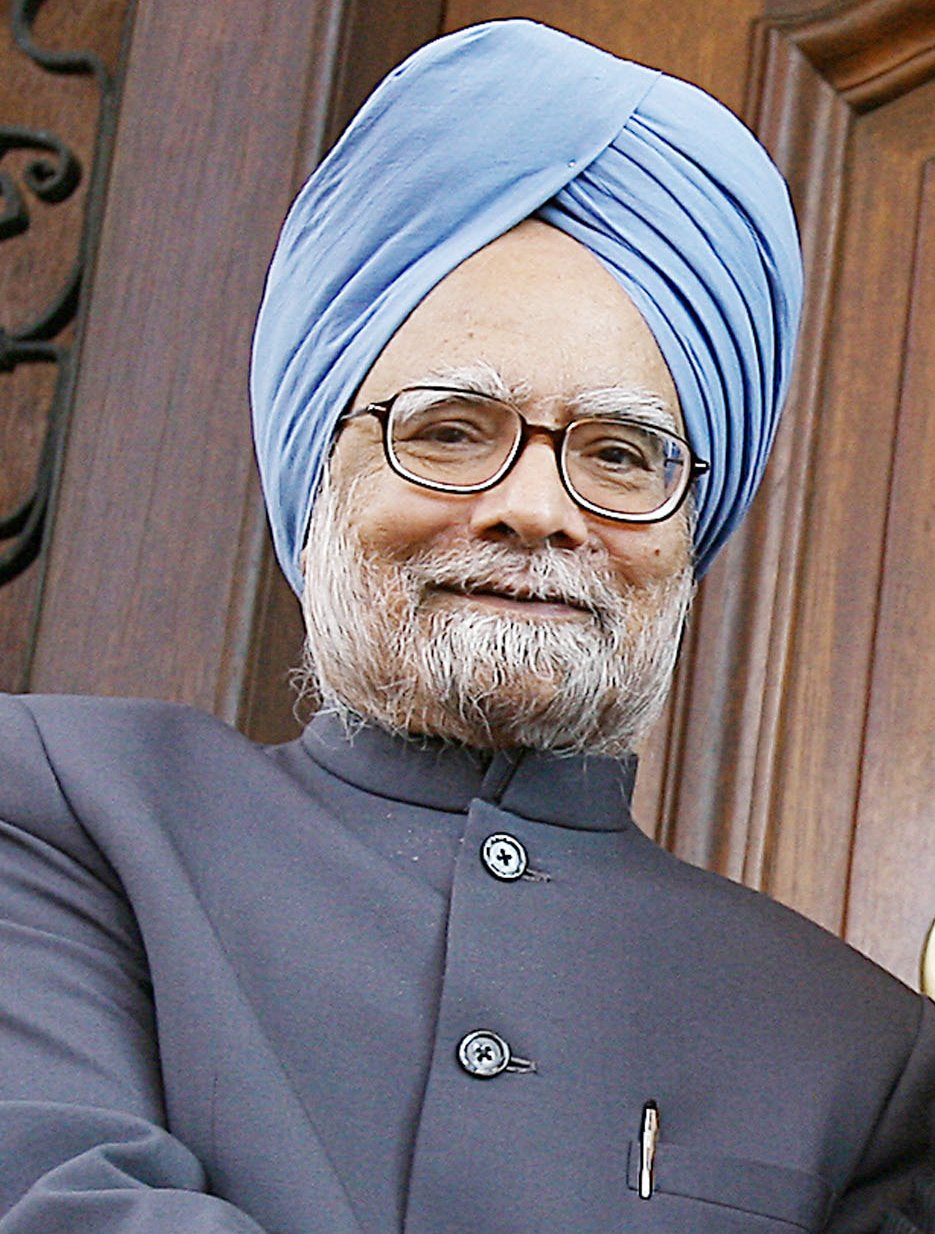
	First party	Second party
Leader	Jaswant Singh	Manmohan Singh
Party	BJP	INC

Rajya Sabha elections were held on various dates in 2001, to elect members of the Rajya Sabha, Indian Parliament's upper chamber. 2 members from Assam and 6 members from Tamil Nadu were elected to Rajya Sabha.

== Elections ==
Elections were held to elect members from various states.

=== Members elected ===
The following members are elected in the elections held in 2001. They are members for the term 2001-2007 and retire in year 2007, except in case of the resignation or death before the term. The list is incomplete.

State - Member - Party

Rajya Sabha members for term 2001–2007
State	Member Name	Party	Remark
Assam	Dr Manmohan Singh	INC	R
Assam	Indramoni Bora	BJP	
Tamil Nadu	R. Kamaraj	AIADMK	
Tamil Nadu	K. P. K. Kumaran	DMK	
Tamil Nadu	S. G. Indira	AIADMK	
Tamil Nadu	S. S. Chandran	AIADMK	
Tamil Nadu	P. G. Narayanan	AIADMK	
Tamil Nadu	B. S. Gnanadesikan	TMC	

== Bye-elections ==
The following bye elections were held in the year 2001.

State - Member - Party

1. Bye-elections were held on 22/02/2001 for vacancy from Punjab and Uttar Pradesh due to disqualification of seating member Barjinder Singh Hamdard on 21.12.2000 with term ending on 09.04.2004 and death of seating member Chaudhary Chuni Lal on 31.12.2000 with term ending on 25.11.2002. From UP Shyam Lal of BJP became member from 16/02/2001.
2. Haryana - xx - INLD ( ele 04/06/2001 term till 2004 )- dea of Devi Lal
3. Punjab - xx - SAD ( ele 04/06/2001 term till 2004 )- res of Raj Mohinder Singh Majitha
4. Uttar Pradesh - Kalraj Mishra - BJP ( ele 04/06/2001 term till 2006 )- res of Raj Nath Singh
5. Jharkhand - Dayanand Sahay - IND ( ele 19/07/2001 term till 2004 ) dea 19/03/2002
6. Bye-elections were held on 17/01/2002 for vacancy from Tamil Nadu due to death of seating member G. K. Moopanar on 30 August 2001 with term ending on 29 June 2004
