= Kamla Manhar =

Indian politician

Member of Parliament, Rajya Sabha
- In office 2003-2006
- Constituency: Chhattisgarh

Personal details
- Born: 7 November 1947 (age 78) Bilaspur, Madhya Pradesh
- Party: Indian National Congress
- Spouse: Manhar Bhagatram

Kamla Manhar (born 7 November 1947) is an Indian politician. She is a Member of Parliament, representing Chhattisgarh in the Rajya Sabha, the upper house of India's Parliament, as a member of the Indian National Congress.
