= 1959 Rajya Sabha elections =

Rajya Sabha elections were held on various dates in 1959, to elect members of the Rajya Sabha, Indian Parliament's upper chamber.

The following elections were held in the year 1959:

1. Maharashtra - Khandubhai Kasanji Desai - INC ( ele 09/03/1959 term till 1964 )
2. Orissa - Ghasiram Sandil - OTH ( ele 05/05/1959 term till 1960 )
3. Bihar - Rajeshwar Prasad Narain Sinha - INC ( ele 12/10/1959 term till 1960 )
4. Nominated - Jairamdas Daulatram - NOM ( ele 19/10/1959 term till 1964 )
5. Nominated - Sardar M. N. Panikkar - NOM ( ele 25/08/1959 term till 1960 )
6. Nominated - Mohanlal Saksena - NOM ( ele 22/11/1959 term till 1964 )
