= 1997 Rajya Sabha elections =

Elections for the upper house of Indian Parliament

Rajya Sabha elections were held in 1997, to elect members of the Rajya Sabha, Indian Parliament's upper chamber. 3 members from Kerala and 1 member from Puducherry were elected.

== Elections ==
Elections were held in 1997 to elect members from various states. The list is incomplete.

=== Members elected ===
The following members are elected in the elections held in 1997. They are members for the term 1997-2003 and retire in year 2003, except in case of the resignation or death before the term.

State - Member - Party

Rajya Sabha members for term 1997-2003
State	Member Name	Party	Remark
Kerala	K.Karunakaran	INC	Res 03/03/1998 LS
Kerala	J. Chitharanjan	CPI	
Kerala	C. O. Poulose	CPM	bye-ele 07/04/1998
Kerala	S. Ramachandran Pillai	CPM	
Nominated	Dr Raja Ramanna	NOM	
Nominated	Dr C. Narayana Reddy	NOM	
Nominated	Dr Mrinal Sen	NOM	
Nominated	Chaudhary Harmohan Singh Yadav	NOM	
Puducherry	C P Thirunavukkarasu	DMK	

== Bye-elections ==
The following bye elections were held in the year 1997.

State - Member - Party

1. Tamil Nadu - S Peter Alphonse- TMC ( ele 10/10/1997 term till 2002 )
2. Tamil Nadu - M Abdul Kader- TMC ( ele 10/10/1997 term till 1998 )
