= Jayanta Kumar Ray =

Indian professor and historian

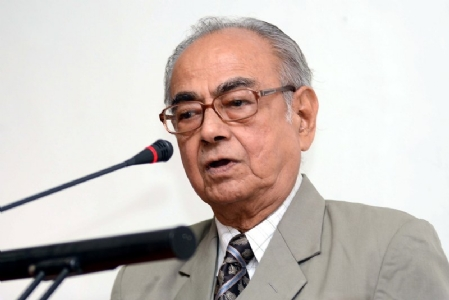
Jayanta Kumar Ray in 2016

Jayanta Kumar Ray (born 9 December 1934) is an Indian historian and National Research Professor. He was born in East Bengal, British India on 9 December 1934.

== Awards and recognition ==
- Eminent Teacher Awards, University of Calcutta, 2014
- National Research Professor, 2015

== Selected publications ==
- Transfer of Power in Indonesia 1942-49, Bombay: Manaktalas, 1967.
- Security in the Missile Age, Bombay: Allied, 1967.
- Democracy and Nationalism on Trial: A Study of East Pakistan, Shimla: Indian Institute of Advanced Study, 1968.
- Portraits of Thai Politics, New Delhi: Orient Longman, 1972.
- Public Policy and Global Reality, New Delhi: Radiant, 1977.
- Administrators in a Mixed Polity, New Delhi: Macmillan, 1981.
- Organizing Villagers for Self-Reliance: A Study of Deedar in Bangladesh, Comilla: Bangladesh Academy for Rural Development, 1983.
- Organizing Villagers for Self-Reliance: A Study of Gonoshasthya Kendra in Bangladesh, Calcutta: Orient Longman, 1986.
- Centre-State Financial Relations in India (Co-author: Hiroshi Sato), Tokyo: Institute of Developing Economies, 1987.
- To Chase a Miracle: A Study of the Grameen Bank of Bangladesh, Dhaka: The University Press Ltd, 1987.
- India : In Search of Good Governance, Kolkata: Maulana Abul Kalam Azad Institute of Asian Studies, 2001.
- India’s Foreign Relations, 1947-2007, New Delhi: Routledge, 2011.
