= U. R. Krishnan =

Indian politician

Urumandampalayam Rayappa Gounder Krishnan
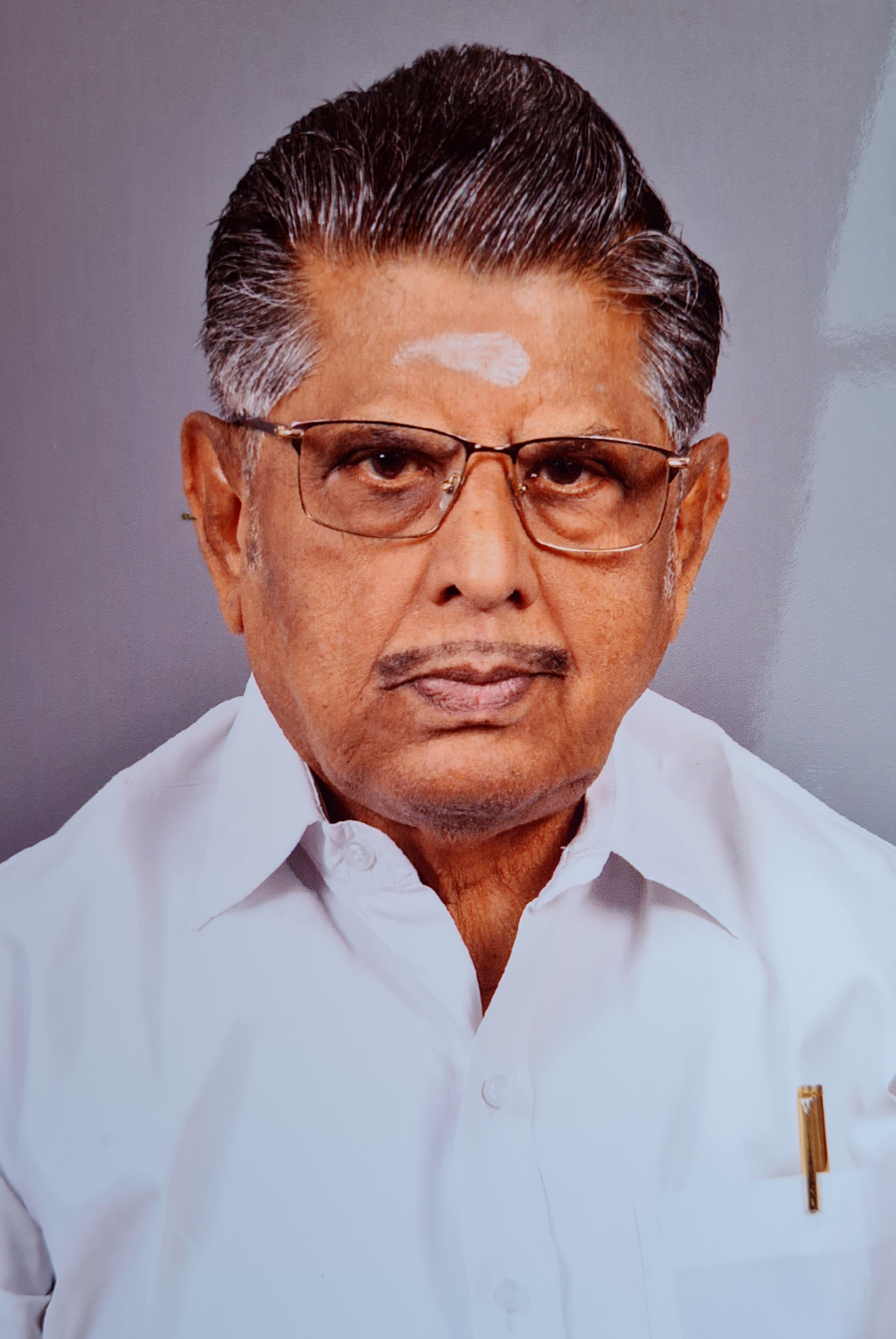

Member of Parliament (Rajya Sabha)
- In office 25 July 1977 – 24 July 1983

Personal details
- Born: 1 April 1944
- Party: All India Anna Dravida Munnetra Kazhagam
- Spouse: Kanmani Devi
- Education: Madras Law College
- Profession: Politician

Urumandampalayam Rayappa Gounder Krishnan (born 1 April 1943) is an Indian politician from the All India Anna Dravida Munnetra Kazhagam Party.

== Early life ==
Krishnan was born on 1 April 1943, to Urumandampalayam Rayappa Gounder.

== Career ==
He served as a member of the Rajya Sabha from 25 July 1977, to 24 July 1983.
