= Ramlal Parikh =

Member of Parliament, Rajya Sabha
- In office 1975–1981
- Constituency: Gujarat

Personal details
- Born: 1927
- Died: 1999 (aged 71–72)
- Party: Janata Party
- Spouse: Padmaben R. Parikh

Ramlal Parikh (1927–1999) was an Indian politician.

== Career ==
A Member of Parliament, representing Gujarat in the Rajya Sabha the upper house of India's Parliament as a member of the Janata Party.
