= Dipen Ghosh =

Indian politician (1932–2016)

Member of Parliament, Rajya Sabha
- In office 1981–1993
- Constituency: West Bengal

Personal details
- Born: 1 February 1932
- Died: 13 November 2016 (aged 84) Kolkata, India
- Party: Communist Party of India (Marxist)
- Spouse: Rina Ghosh

Dipen Ghosh (1 February 1932 – 13 November 2016) an Indian politician. He was a Member of Parliament, representing West Bengal in the Rajya Sabha the upper house of India's Parliament as a member of the Communist Party of India (Marxist).

Ghosh died in Kolkata on 13 November 2016, at the age of 84.
