= Pratima Bose =

Indian politician (1923–1985)

Member of Parliament, Rajya Sabha
- In office 1975–1981
- Constituency: West Bengal

Personal details
- Born: 18 June 1923
- Died: 1985 (aged 61–62)
- Party: Indian National Congress

Pratima Bose (18 June 1923 – 1985) was an Indian politician. She was a Member of Parliament, representing West Bengal in the Rajya Sabha the upper house of India's Parliament as a member of the Indian National Congress. Bose died in 1985.
