= Noorjehan Razack =

Indian politician

Member of Parliament, Rajya Sabha
- In office 1977–1983
- Constituency: Tamil Nadu

Personal details
- Born: 25 December 1939 (age 86)
- Party: AIADMK

Noorjehan Razack is an Indian politician. She served as a Member of Parliament representing Tamil Nadu in the Rajya Sabha the upper house of India's Parliament as a member of the AIADMK from 1977 to 1983.
