= K. Chandran Pillai =

Indian politician

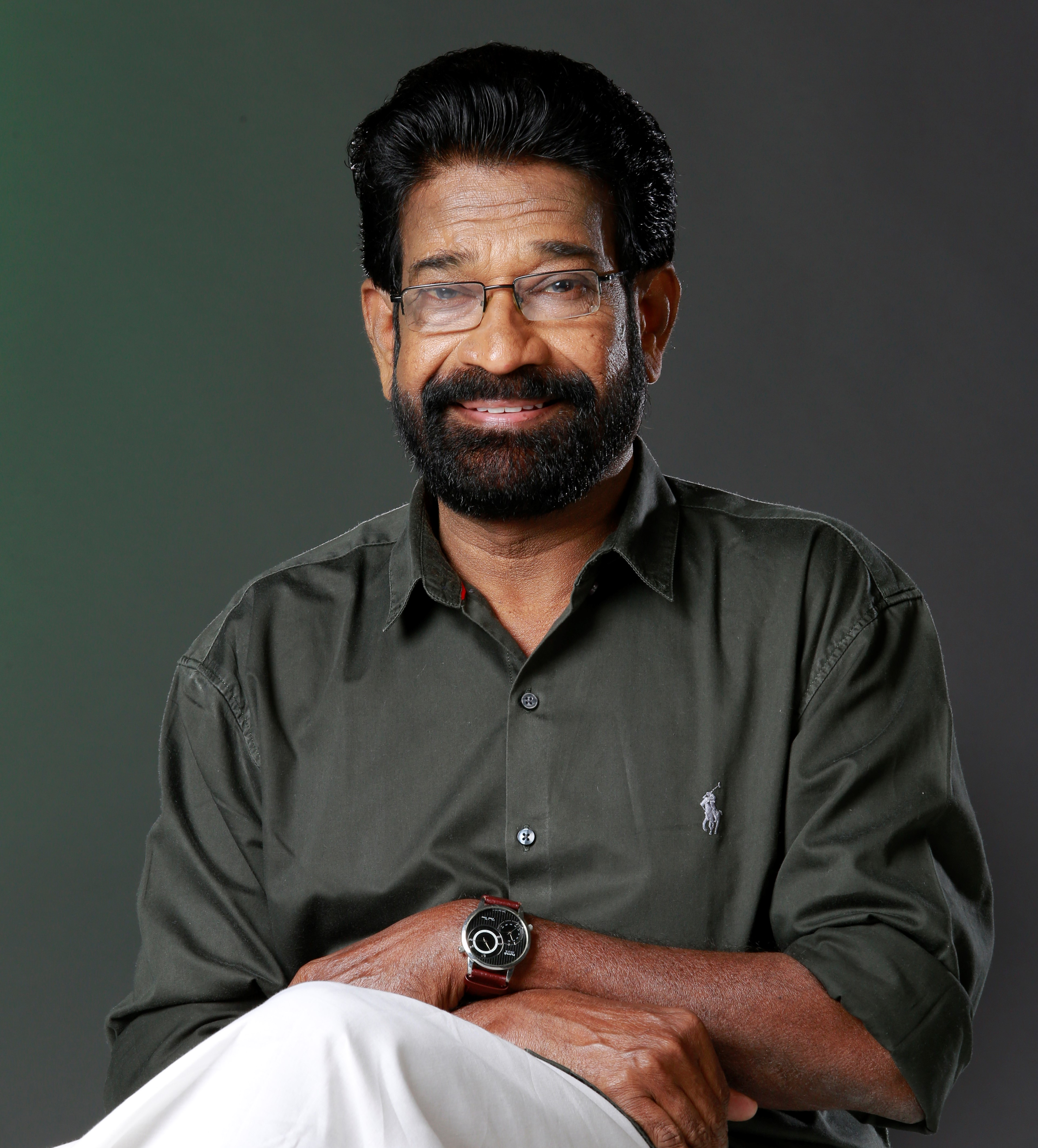

Chairman, Greater Cochin Development Authority (GCDA)
- Incumbent
- Assumed office 7 February 2022

Kesava Chandran Pillai is a politician and member of the Communist Party of India (Marxist). He is a former Member of the Parliament of India, representing Kerala in the Rajya Sabha, the upper house of the Indian Parliament. Currently, he works as the national secretary of CITU. Presently appointed as the Chairman of Greater Cochin Development Authority (GCDA).

Pillai was born on 18 August 1956 to M. Kesava Pillai and M. Saraswathi Amma at Aymanam in Kottayam district, Kerala. He has a B.Sc. in chemistry and was educated at FACT High School, St. Paul's College and St. Albert's College, all in Ernakulam.

In April 2003, Pillai was elected to the Rajya Sabha. He has held various committee position, including:

- May 2003 - February 2004 Member, Committee on Industry
- May 2003 - February 2004 Member, Consultative Committee for the Ministry of Commerce
- May 2003 onwards Member, National Welfare Board for Seafarers
- August 2004 onwards Member, Committee on Labour Member, Coir Board
- October 2004 onwards Member, Consultative Committee for the Ministry of Chemicals and Fertilizers and Ministry of Steel
- May 2006 onwards Member, Committee on Public Undertakings

He married K. M. Sheela on 14 February 1988; the couple have a son (Pramod Chandran Das) and a daughter (Shalini C).
