= Leonard Soloman Saring =

Indian politician

Member of Parliament, Rajya Sabha
- In office 1975-1987
- Constituency: Sikkim

Personal details
- Born: 12 February 1942 Sikkim
- Party: Indian National Congress

Leonard Soloman Saring is an Indian politician. He was a Member of Parliament , the first to represent Sikkim. He was In the Rajya Sabha, the upper house of India's Parliament as member of the Indian National Congress.
