= List of members of the 12th Lok Sabha =

Members of Lok Sabha (1998-99)

This is a list of members of the 12th Lok Sabha arranged by state or territory represented. These members of the lower house of the Indian Parliament were elected to the 12th Lok Sabha (1998 to 1999) at the 1998 Indian general election.

== Andhra Pradesh ==
INC (22) TDP (12) BJP (4) CPI (2) AIMIM (1) JD (1)

No.	Constituency	Type	Name of Elected M.P.	Party affiliation
1	Srikakulam	GEN	Yerrannaidu Kinjarapu	Telugu Desam Party
2	Parvathipuram	ST	Vijaya Ramaraju Setrucharla	Telugu Desam Party
3	Bobbili	GEN	Kondapalli Pydithalli Naidu	Telugu Desam Party
4	Visakhapatnam	GEN	T. Subbarami Reddy	Indian National Congress
5	Bhadrachalam	ST	Sode Ramaiah	Communist Party of India
6	Anakapalli	GEN	Gudivada Gurunadha Rao	Indian National Congress
7	Kakinada	GEN	Venkata Krishnam Raju Uppalapati	Bharatiya Janata Party
8	Rajahmundry	GEN	Girajala Venkata Swamy Naidu	Bharatiya Janata Party
9	Amalapuram	SC	Ganti Mohanachandra Balayogi	Telugu Desam Party
10	Narasapur	GEN	Kanumuru Bapi Raju	Indian National Congress
11	Eluru	GEN	Maganti Venkateswara Rao	Indian National Congress
12	Machilipatnam	GEN	Kavuru Samba Siva Rao	Indian National Congress
13	Vijayawada	GEN	Upendra Parvathaneni	Indian National Congress
14	Tenali	GEN	P. Shiv Shankar	Indian National Congress
15	Guntur	GEN	Rayapati Sambasiva Rao	Indian National Congress
16	Bapatla	GEN	Nedurumalli Janardhana Reddy	Indian National Congress
17	Narasaraopet	GEN	Konijeti Rosaiah	Indian National Congress
18	Ongole	GEN	Magunta Sreenivasulu Reddy	Indian National Congress
19	Nellore	SC	Panabaka Lakshmi	Indian National Congress
20	Tirupathi	SC	Chinta Mohan	Indian National Congress
21	Chittoor	GEN	Nuthanakalva Ramakrishna Reddy	Telugu Desam Party
22	Rajampet	GEN	Sai Prathap Annayyagari	Indian National Congress
23	Cuddapah	GEN	Y. S. Rajasekhara Reddy	Indian National Congress
24	Hindupur	GEN	S. Gangadhar	Indian National Congress
25	Anantapur	GEN	Anantha Venkatarami Reddy	Indian National Congress
26	Kurnool	GEN	Kotla Vijaya Bhaskara Reddy	Indian National Congress
27	Nandyal	GEN	Bhuma Nagi Reddy	Telugu Desam Party
28	Nagarkurnool	SC	Mallu Ravi	Indian National Congress
29	Mahabubnagar	GEN	S. Jaipal Reddy	Janata Dal
30	Hyderabad	GEN	Sultan Salahuddin Owaisi	All India Majlis-e-Ittehadul Muslimeen
31	Secunderabad	GEN	Bandaru Dattatraya	Bharatiya Janata Party
32	Siddipet	SC	Malyala Rajaiah	Telugu Desam Party
33	Medak	GEN	Baga Reddy	Indian National Congress
34	Nizamabad	GEN	Gaddam Ganga Reddy	Telugu Desam Party
35	Adilabad	GEN	Dr. Samudrala Venugopal Chary	Telugu Desam Party
36	Peddapalli	SC	Chellamalla Suguna Kumari	Telugu Desam Party
37	Karimnagar	GEN	Chennamaneni Vidyasagar Rao	Bharatiya Janata Party
38	Hanamkonda	GEN	Chada Suresh Reddy	Telugu Desam Party
39	Warangal	GEN	Azmeera Chandulal	Telugu Desam Party
40	Khammam	GEN	Nadendla Bhaskara Rao	Indian National Congress
41	Nalgonda	GEN	Suravaram Sudhakar Reddy	Communist Party of India
42	Miryalguda	GEN	Baddam Narsimha Reddy	Indian National Congress

== Arunachal Pradesh ==
Arunachal Congress (2)

No.	Constituency	Type	Name of Elected M.P.	Party affiliation
1	Arunachal West	GEN	Omak Apang	Arunachal Congress
2	Arunachal East	GEN	Wangcha Rajkumar	Arunachal Congress

== Assam ==
INC (10) BJP(1) ASDC (1) UMFA(1) Independent(1)

No.	Constituency	Type	Name of Elected M.P.	Party affiliation
1	Karimganj	SC	Nepal Chandra Das	Indian National Congress
2	Silchar	GEN	Kabindra Purkayastha	Bharatiya Janata Party
3	Autonomous District	ST	Jayanta Rongpi	Autonomous State Demand Committee
4	Dhubri	GEN	Abdul Hamid	Indian National Congress
5	Kokrajhar	ST	Sansuma Khunggur Bwiswmuthiary	Independent
6	Barpeta	GEN	A. F. Golam Osmani	United Minorities Front Assam
7	Gauhati	GEN	Bhubaneswar Kalita	Indian National Congress
8	Mangaldoi	GEN	Madhab Rajbangshi	Indian National Congress
9	Tezpur	GEN	Moni Kumar Subba	Indian National Congress
10	Nowgong	GEN	Nripen Goswami	Indian National Congress
11	Kaliabor	GEN	Tarun Gogoi	Indian National Congress
12	Jorhat	GEN	Bijoy Krishna Handique	Indian National Congress
13	Dibrugarh	GEN	Paban Singh Ghatowar	Indian National Congress
14	Lakhimpur	GEN	Ranee Narah	Indian National Congress

== Bihar ==
BJP (20) RJD (17) SAP (10) INC (5) JD (1) RJP (1)

#	Constituency	Name	Party
1	Bagaha (SC)	Mahendra Baitha	Samata Party
2	Bettiah	Madan Prasad Jaiswal	Bharatiya Janata Party
3	Motihari	Rama Devi	Rashtriya Janata Dal
4	Gopalganj	Abdul Ghafoor	Samata Party
5	Siwan	Mohammad Shahabuddin	Rashtriya Janata Dal
6	Maharajganj	Prabhunath Singh	Samata Party
7	Chapra	Heera Lal Rai	Rashtriya Janata Dal
8	Hajipur (SC)	Ram Vilas Paswan	Janata Dal
9	Vaishali	Raghuvansh Prasad Singh	Rashtriya Janata Dal
10	Muzaffarpur	Jai Narain Prasad Nishad	Rashtriya Janata Dal
11	Sitamarhi	Sitaram Yadav	Rashtriya Janata Dal
12	Sheohar	Anand Mohan Singh	Rashtriya Janata Party
13	Madhubani	Shakeel Ahmad	Indian National Congress
14	Jhanjharpur	Surendra Prasad Yadav	Rashtriya Janata Dal
15	Darbhanga	Ali Ashraf Fatmi	Rashtriya Janata Dal
16	Rosera (SC)	Pitambar Paswan	Rashtriya Janata Dal
17	Samastipur	Ajit Kumar Mehta	Rashtriya Janata Dal
18	Barh	Nitish Kumar	Samata Party
19	Balia	Raj Banshi Mahto	Rashtriya Janata Dal
20	Saharsa	Anup Lal Yadav	Rashtriya Janata Dal
21	Madhepura	Lalu Prasad Yadav	Rashtriya Janata Dal
22	Araria (SC)	Ramjidas Rishidev	Bharatiya Janata Party
23	Kishanganj	Taslimuddin	Rashtriya Janata Dal
24	Purnea	Jai Krishna Mandal	Bharatiya Janata Party
25	Katihar	Tariq Anwar	Indian National Congress
26	Rajmahal (ST)	Som Marandi	Bharatiya Janata Party
27	Dumka (ST)	Babulal Marandi	Bharatiya Janata Party
28	Godda	Jagdambi Prasad Yadav	Bharatiya Janata Party
29	Banka	Digvijay Singh	Samata Party
30	Bhagalpur	Prabhas Chandra Tiwari	Bharatiya Janata Party
31	Khagaria	Shakuni Choudhary	Samata Party
32	Monghyr	Vijay Kumar Yadav	Rashtriya Janata Dal
33	Begusarai	Rajo Singh	Indian National Congress
34	Nalanda	George Fernandes	Samata Party
35	Patna	C. P. Thakur	Bharatiya Janata Party
36	Arrah	Haridwar Prasad Singh	Samata Party
37	Buxar	Lalmuni Chaubey	Bharatiya Janata Party
38	Sasaram (SC)	Muni Lall	Bharatiya Janata Party
39	Bikramganj	Bashistha Narain Singh	Samata Party
40	Aurangabad	Sushil Kumar Singh	Samata Party
41	Jahanabad	Surendra Prasad Yadav	Rashtriya Janata Dal
42	Nawada (SC)	Malti Devi	Rashtriya Janata Dal
43	Gaya (SC)	Krishna Kumar Choudhary	Bharatiya Janata Party
44	Chatra	Dhirendra Agarwal	Bharatiya Janata Party
45	Kodarma	Rati Lal Prasad Verma	Bharatiya Janata Party
46	Giridih	Ravindra Kumar Pandey	Bharatiya Janata Party
47	Dhanbad	Rita Verma	Bharatiya Janata Party
48	Hazaribagh	Yashwant Sinha	Bharatiya Janata Party
49	Ranchi	Ram Tahal Choudhary	Bharatiya Janata Party
50	Jamshedpur	Abha Mahato	Bharatiya Janata Party
51	Singhbhum (ST)	Vijay Singh Soy	Indian National Congress
52	Khunti (ST)	Kariya Munda	Bharatiya Janata Party
53	Lohardaga (ST)	Indra Nath Bhagat	Indian National Congress
54	Palamu (SC)	Braj Mohan Ram	Bharatiya Janata Party

== Goa ==
INC (2)

No.	Constituency	Type	Name of Elected M.P.	Party affiliation
1	Panaji	GEN	Ravi Naik	Indian National Congress
2	Mormugao	GEN	Francisco Sardinha	Indian National Congress

== Gujarat ==
BJP (19) INC (7)

No.	Constituency	Type	Name of Elected M.P.	Party affiliation
1	Kutch	GEN	Pushpdan Shambhudan Gadhavi	Bharatiya Janata Party
2	Surendranagar	GEN	Bhavna Dave	Bharatiya Janata Party
3	Jamnagar	GEN	Chandresh Patel Kordia	Bharatiya Janata Party
4	Rajkot	GEN	Vallabhbhai Kathiria	Bharatiya Janata Party
5	Porbandar	GEN	Gordhanbhai Javia	Bharatiya Janata Party
6	Junagadh	GEN	Bhavna Chikhalia	Bharatiya Janata Party
7	Amreli	GEN	Dileep Sanghani	Bharatiya Janata Party
8	Bhavnagar	GEN	Rajendrasinh Rana	Bharatiya Janata Party
9	Dhandhuka	SC	Ratilal Kalidas Varma	Bharatiya Janata Party
10	Ahmedabad	GEN	Harin Pathak	Bharatiya Janata Party
11	Gandhinagar	GEN	Lal Krishna Advani	Bharatiya Janata Party
12	Mehsana	GEN	A.K. Patel	Bharatiya Janata Party
13	Patan	SC	Mahesh Kanodia	Bharatiya Janata Party
14	Banaskantha	GEN	Haribhai Chaudhary	Bharatiya Janata Party
15	Sabarkantha	GEN	Nisha Chaudhary	Indian National Congress
16	Kapadvanj	GEN	Jaysinhji Chauhan	Bharatiya Janata Party
17	Dohad	ST	Damor Somjibhai Punjabhai	Indian National Congress
18	Godhra	GEN	Shantilal Patel	Indian National Congress
19	Kaira	GEN	Dinsha Patel	Indian National Congress
20	Anand	GEN	Ishwarbhai Chavda	Indian National Congress
21	Chhota Udaipur	ST	Naranbhai Rathwa	Indian National Congress
22	Baroda	GEN	Jayaben Thakkar	Bharatiya Janata Party
23	Broach	GEN	Chandubhai Deshmukh	Bharatiya Janata Party
24	Surat	GEN	Kashiram Rana	Bharatiya Janata Party
25	Mandvi	ST	Chhitubhai Gamit	Indian National Congress
26	Bulsar	ST	Manibhai Chaudhary	Bharatiya Janata Party

== Haryana ==
No.	Constituency	Type	Name of Elected M.P.	Party affiliation
1	Ambala	SC	Aman Kumar Nagra	Bahujan Samaj Party
2	Kurukshetra	GEN	Kailasho Devi	Indian National Lok Dal
3	Karnal	GEN	Bhajan Lal	Indian National Congress
4	Sonepat	GEN	Kishan Singh Sangwan	Indian National Lok Dal
5	Rohtak	GEN	Bhupinder Singh Hooda	Indian National Congress
6	Faridabad	GEN	Ramchandra Bainda	Bharatiya Janata Party
7	Mahendragarh	GEN	Inderjit Singh Rao	Indian National Congress
8	Bhiwani	GEN	Surender Singh	Haryana Vikas Party
9	Hissar	GEN	Surender Singh Barwala	Indian National Lok Dal
10	Sirsa	SC	Sushil Kumar Indora	Indian National Lok Dal

== Himachal Pradesh ==
No.	Constituency	Type	Name of Elected M.P.	Party affiliation
1	Simla	SC	Krishan Dutt Sultanpuri	Indian National Congress
2	Mandi	GEN	Maheshwar Singh	Bharatiya Janata Party
3	Kangra	GEN	Shanta Kumar	Bharatiya Janata Party
4	Hamirpur	GEN	Suresh Chandel	Bharatiya Janata Party

== Jammu & Kashmir ==
JKNC (3) BJP (2) INC (1)

#	Constituency	Name	Party
1	Baramulla	Saifuddin Soz	Jammu & Kashmir National Conference
2	Srinagar	Omar Abdullah	Jammu & Kashmir National Conference
3	Anantnag	Mufti Mohammad Sayeed	Indian National Congress
4	Ladakh	Syed Hussain	Jammu & Kashmir National Conference
5	Udhampur	Chaman Lal Gupta	Bharatiya Janata Party
6	Jammu	Vishno Datt Sharma	Bharatiya Janata Party

== Karnataka ==
No.	Constituency	Type	Name of Elected M.P.	Party affiliation
1	Bidar	SC	Ramchandra Veerappa	Bharatiya Janata Party
2	Gulbarga	GEN	Basavaraj Patil Sedam	Bharatiya Janata Party
3	Raichur	GEN	A. Venkatesh Naik	Indian National Congress
4	Koppal	GEN	H.G.Ramulu	Indian National Congress
5	Bellary	GEN	K.C. Kondaiah	Indian National Congress
6	Davangere	GEN	Shamanuru Shivashankarappa	Indian National Congress
7	Chitradurga	GEN	C. P. Mudala Giriyappa	Indian National Congress
8	Tumkur	GEN	S. Mallikarjunaiah	Bharatiya Janata Party
9	Chikballapur	GEN	R.L. Jalappa	Indian National Congress
10	Kolar	SC	K.H. Muniyappa	Indian National Congress
11	Kanakapura	GEN	M. Srinivas	Bharatiya Janata Party
12	Bangalore North	GEN	C.K. Jaffar Sharief	Indian National Congress
13	Bangalore South	GEN	Ananth Kumar	Bharatiya Janata Party
14	Mandya	GEN	Ambareesh	Janata Dal
15	Chamarajanagar	SC	Siddaraju A.	Janata Dal
16	Mysore	GEN	C.H. Vijayashankar	Bharatiya Janata Party
17	Mangalore	GEN	Dhananjay Kumar	Bharatiya Janata Party
18	Udupi	GEN	I. M. Jayarama Shetty	Bharatiya Janata Party
19	Hassan	GEN	H.D. Devegowda	Janata Dal
20	Chikmagalur	GEN	D. C. Srikantappa	Bharatiya Janata Party
21	Shimoga	GEN	Aayanooru Manjunatha	Bharatiya Janata Party
22	Kanara	GEN	Ananth Kumar Hegde	Bharatiya Janata Party
23	Dharwad South	GEN	B M Menasinakai	Lok Shakti
24	Dharwad North	GEN	Vijay Sankeshwar	Bharatiya Janata Party
25	Belgaum	GEN	Babagouda Rudragouda Patil	Bharatiya Janata Party
26	Chikkodi	SC	Jigajinagi Ramesh Chandappa	Lok Shakti
27	Bagalkot	GEN	Ajaykumar Sambasadashiv Sarnaik	Lok Shakti
28	Bijapur	GEN	Patil Mallanagouda Basanagouda	Indian National Congress

== Kerala ==
INC (8) CPI(M) (6) CPI (2) IUML (2) RSP (1) KC(M) (1)

#	Constituency	Name	Party
1	Kasaragod	T. Govindan	Communist Party of India (Marxist)
2	Cannanore	Mullappally Ramachandran	Indian National Congress
3	Badagara	A. K. Premajam	Communist Party of India (Marxist)
4	Calicut	P. Sankaran	Indian National Congress
5	Manjeri	E. Ahamed	Indian Union Muslim League
6	Ponnani	G. M. Banatwalla	Indian Union Muslim League
7	Palghat	N. N. Krishnadas	Communist Party of India (Marxist)
8	Ottapalam (SC)	S. Ajaya Kumar	Communist Party of India (Marxist)
9	Trichur	V. V. Raghavan	Communist Party of India
10	Mukundapuram	A. C. Jose	Indian National Congress
11	Ernakulam	George Eden	Indian National Congress
12	Muvattupuzha	P. C. Thomas	Kerala Congress (M)
13	Kottayam	K. Suresh Kurup	Communist Party of India (Marxist)
14	Idukki	P. C. Chacko	Indian National Congress
15	Alleppey	V. M. Sudheeran	Indian National Congress
16	Mavelikara	P. J. Kurien	Indian National Congress
17	Adoor (SC)	Chengara Surendran	Communist Party of India
18	Quilon	N. K. Premachandran	Revolutionary Socialist Party
19	Chirayinkil	Varkala Radhakrishnan	Communist Party of India (Marxist)
20	Trivandrum	K. Karunakaran	Indian National Congress

== Madhya Pradesh ==
No.	Constituency	Type	Name of Elected M.P.	Party affiliation
1	Morena	SC	Ashok Chhabiram	Bharatiya Janata Party
2	Bhind	GEN	Dr. Ramlakhan Singh	Bharatiya Janata Party
3	Gwalior	GEN	Madhavrao Scindia	Indian National Congress
4	Guna	GEN	Rajmata Vijayraje Scindia	Bharatiya Janata Party
5	Sagar	SC	Virendra Kumar	Bharatiya Janata Party
6	Khajuraho	GEN	Uma Bharti	Bharatiya Janata Party
7	Damoh	GEN	Dr. Ramakrishna Kusmaria	Bharatiya Janata Party
8	Satna	GEN	Ramanand Singh	Bharatiya Janata Party
9	Rewa	GEN	Chandramani Tripathi	Bharatiya Janata Party
10	Sidhi	ST	Jagannath Singh	Bharatiya Janata Party
11	Shahdol	ST	Gyan Singh	Bharatiya Janata Party
12	Surguja	ST	Larang Sai	Bharatiya Janata Party
13	Raigarh	ST	Ajit Jogi	Indian National Congress
14	Janjgir	GEN	Charan Das Mahant	Indian National Congress
15	Bilaspur	SC	Punnulal Mohle	Bharatiya Janata Party
16	Sarangarh	SC	Paras Ram Bhardwaj	Indian National Congress
17	Raipur	GEN	Ramesh Bais	Bharatiya Janata Party
18	Mahasamund	GEN	Chandrashekhar Sahu	Bharatiya Janata Party
19	Kanker	ST	Sohan Potai	Bharatiya Janata Party
20	Bastar	ST	Baliram Kashyap	Bharatiya Janata Party
21	Durg	GEN	Tarachand Sahu	Bharatiya Janata Party
22	Rajnandgaon	GEN	Motilal Vora	Indian National Congress
23	Balaghat	GEN	Gaurishankar Bisen	Bharatiya Janata Party
24	Mandla	ST	Faggan Singh Kulaste	Bharatiya Janata Party
25	Jabalpur	GEN	Baburao Paranjpe	Bharatiya Janata Party
26	Seoni	GEN	Vimla Varma	Indian National Congress
27	Chhindwara	GEN	Kamal Nath	Indian National Congress
28	Betul	GEN	Vijay Kumar Khandelwal	Bharatiya Janata Party
29	Hoshangabad	GEN	Sartaj Singh	Bharatiya Janata Party
30	Bhopal	GEN	Sushil Chandra Verma	Bharatiya Janata Party
31	Vidisha	GEN	Shivraj Singh Chouhan	Bharatiya Janata Party
32	Rajgarh	GEN	Lakshman Singh	Indian National Congress
33	Shajapur	SC	Thawar Chand Gehlot	Bharatiya Janata Party
34	Khandwa	GEN	Nand Kumar Singh Chauhan	Bharatiya Janata Party
35	Khargone	GEN	Rameshwar Patidar	Bharatiya Janata Party
36	Dhar	ST	Gajendra Singh Rajukhedi	Indian National Congress
37	Indore	GEN	Sumitra Mahajan	Bharatiya Janata Party
38	Ujjain	SC	Satyanarayan Jatiya	Bharatiya Janata Party
39	Jhabua	ST	Kantilal Bhuria	Indian National Congress
40	Mandsaur	GEN	Dr. Laxminarayan Pandey	Bharatiya Janata Party

== Maharashtra ==
No.	Constituency	Type	Name of Elected M.P.	Party affiliation
1	Rajapur	GEN	Suresh Prabhakar Prabhu	Shiv Sena
2	Ratnagiri	GEN	Anant Geete	Shiv Sena
3	Kolaba	GEN	Ramsheth Thakur	Peasants and Workers Party of India
4	Mumbai South	GEN	Murli Deora	Indian National Congress
5	Mumbai South Central	GEN	Mohan Rawale	Shiv Sena
6	Mumbai North Central	GEN	Ramdas Athawale	Republican Party of India
7	Mumbai North East	GEN	Gurudas Kamat	Indian National Congress
8	Mumbai North West	GEN	Madhukar Sarpotdar	Shiv Sena
9	Mumbai North	GEN	Ram Naik	Bharatiya Janata Party
10	Thane	GEN	Paranjape Prakash Vishvanath	Shiv Sena
11	Dahanu	ST	Shankar Sakharam	Indian National Congress
12	Nashik	GEN	Madhav Patil	Indian National Congress
13	Malegaon	ST	Zamru Manglu Kahandole	Indian National Congress
14	Dhule	ST	Dhanaji Sitaram Ahire	Indian National Congress
15	Nandurbar	ST	Manikrao Hodlya Gavit	Indian National Congress
16	Erandol	GEN	Annasaheb M. K. Patil	Bharatiya Janata Party
17	Jalgaon	GEN	Ulhas Vasudeo Patil	Indian National Congress
18	Buldhana	SC	Mukul Balkrishna Wasnik	Indian National Congress
19	Akola	GEN	Ambedkar Prakash Yashwant	Republican Party of India
20	Washim	GEN	Sudhakarrao Naik	Indian National Congress
21	Amravati	GEN	Ramkrishnan Suryabhan Gavai	Republican Party of India
22	Ramtek	GEN	Rani Chitralekha Bhonsle	Indian National Congress
23	Nagpur	GEN	Vilas Muttemwar	Indian National Congress
24	Bhandara	GEN	Praful Patel	Indian National Congress
25	Chimur	GEN	Jogendra Kawade	Republican Party of India
26	Chandrapur	GEN	Nareshkumar Chunnalal Puglia	Indian National Congress
27	Wardha	GEN	Datta Meghe	Indian National Congress
28	Yavatmal	GEN	Uttamrao Deorao Patil	Indian National Congress
29	Hingoli	GEN	Suryakanta Patil	Indian National Congress
30	Nanded	GEN	Bhaskarrao Bapurao Khatgaonkar	Indian National Congress
31	Parbhani	GEN	Suresh Warpudkar	Indian National Congress
32	Jalna	GEN	Uttamsingh Pawar	Bharatiya Janata Party
33	Aurangabad	GEN	Ramkrishna Baba Patil	Indian National Congress
34	Beed	GEN	Jaisingrao Gaikwad Patil	Bharatiya Janata Party
35	Latur	GEN	Shivraj Patil	Indian National Congress
36	Osmanabad	SC	Arvind Kamble	Indian National Congress
37	Solapur	GEN	Sushilkumar Shinde	Indian National Congress
38	Pandharpur	SC	Sandipan Thorat	Indian National Congress
39	Ahmednagar	GEN	Balasaheb Vikhe Patil	Shiv Sena
40	Kopargaon	GEN	Prasad Tanpure	Indian National Congress
41	Khed	GEN	Ashok Mohol	Indian National Congress
42	Pune	GEN	Vitthal Tupe	Indian National Congress
43	Baramati	GEN	Sharad Pawar	Indian National Congress
44	Satara	GEN	Abhaysinh Bhonsle	Indian National Congress
45	Karad	GEN	Prithviraj Chavan	Indian National Congress
46	Sangli	GEN	Madan Patil	Indian National Congress
47	Ichalkaranji	GEN	Kallappa Awade	Indian National Congress
48	Kolhapur	GEN	Sadashivrao Dadoba Mandlik	Indian National Congress

== Manipur ==
No.	Constituency	Type	Name of Elected M.P.	Party affiliation
1	Inner Manipur	GEN	Th. Chaoba Singh	Manipur State Congress Party
2	Outer Manipur	ST	Kumari Kim Gangte	Communist Party of India

== Meghalaya ==
No.	Constituency	Type	Name of Elected M.P.	Party affiliation
1	Shillong	GEN	Paty Ripple Kyndiah	Indian National Congress
2	Tura	GEN	Purno Agitok Sangma	Indian National Congress

== Mizoram ==
No.	Constituency	Type	Name of Elected M.P.	Party affiliation
1	Mizoram	ST	H. Lallungmuana	Independent

== Nagaland ==
No.	Constituency	Type	Name of Elected M.P.	Party affiliation
1	Nagaland	GEN	K. Asungba Sangtam	Indian National Congress

== Orissa ==
No.	Constituency	Type	Name of Elected M.P.	Party affiliation
1	Mayurbhanj	ST	Salkhan Murmu	Bharatiya Janata Party
2	Balasore	GEN	Kharabela Swain	Bharatiya Janata Party
3	Bhadrak	SC	Arjun Charan Sethi	Biju Janata Dal
4	Jajpur	SC	Rama Chandra Mallick	Indian National Congress
5	Kendrapara	GEN	Prabhat Kumar Samantaray	Biju Janata Dal
6	Cuttack	GEN	Bhartruhari Mahtab	Biju Janata Dal
7	Jagatsinghpur	GEN	Ranjib Biswal	Indian National Congress
8	Puri	GEN	Braja Kishore Tripathy	Biju Janata Dal
9	Bhubaneswar	GEN	Prasanna Kumar Patasani	Biju Janata Dal
10	Aska	GEN	Naveen Patnaik	Biju Janata Dal
11	Berhampur	GEN	Jayanti Patnaik	Indian National Congress
12	Koraput	ST	Giridhar Gamang	Indian National Congress
13	Nowrangpur	ST	Khagapati Pradhani	Indian National Congress
14	Kalahandi	GEN	Bikram Keshari Deo	Bharatiya Janata Party
15	Phulbani	SC	Padmanava Behara	Biju Janata Dal
16	Bolangir	GEN	Sangeeta Kumari Singh Deo	Bharatiya Janata Party
17	Sambalpur	GEN	Prasanna Acharya	Biju Janata Dal
18	Deogarh	GEN	Debendra Pradhan	Bharatiya Janata Party
19	Dhenkanal	GEN	Tathagata Satapathy	Biju Janata Dal
20	Sundargarh	ST	Jual Oram	Bharatiya Janata Party
21	Keonjhar	ST	Upendra Nath Nayak	Bharatiya Janata Party

== Punjab ==
No.	Constituency	Type	Name of Elected M.P.	Party affiliation
1	Gurdaspur	GEN	Vinod Khanna	Bharatiya Janata Party
2	Amritsar	GEN	Daya Singh Sodhi	Bharatiya Janata Party
3	Tarn Taran	GEN	Tarlochan Singh Tur	Shiromani Akali Dal
4	Jullundur	GEN	Inder Kumar Gujral	Janata Dal
5	Phillaur	SC	Satnam Singh Kainth	Independent
6	Hoshiarpur	GEN	Kamal Chaudhry	Bharatiya Janata Party
7	Ropar	SC	Satwinder Kaur Dhaliwal	Shiromani Akali Dal
8	Patiala	GEN	Prem Singh Chandumajra	Shiromani Akali Dal
9	Ludhiana	GEN	Amrik Singh Aliwal	Shiromani Akali Dal
10	Sangrur	GEN	Surjit Singh Barnala	Shiromani Akali Dal
11	Bhatinda	SC	Chatin Singh Samaon	Shiromani Akali Dal
12	Faridkot	GEN	Sukhbir Singh Badal	Shiromani Akali Dal
13	Ferozepur	GEN	Zora Singh Maan	Shiromani Akali Dal

== Rajasthan ==
No.	Constituency	Type	Name of Elected M.P.	Party affiliation
1	Ganganagar	SC	Shankar Pannu	Indian National Congress
2	Bikaner	GEN	Balram Jakhar	Indian National Congress
3	Churu	GEN	Narendra Budania	Indian National Congress
4	Jhunjhunu	GEN	Sis Ram Ola	All India Indira Congress
5	Sikar	GEN	Subhash Maharia	Bharatiya Janata Party
6	Jaipur	GEN	Girdhari Lal Bhargava	Bharatiya Janata Party
7	Dausa	GEN	Rajesh Pilot	Indian National Congress
8	Alwar	GEN	Ghasi Ram Yadav	Indian National Congress
9	Bharatpur	GEN	K. Natwar Singh	Indian National Congress
10	Bayana	SC	Ganga Ram Koli	Bharatiya Janata Party
11	Sawai Madhopur	ST	Usha Meena	Indian National Congress
12	Ajmer	GEN	Prabha Thakur	Indian National Congress
13	Tonk	SC	Dowaraka Prasad Bairwa	Indian National Congress
14	Kota	GEN	Ramnarayan Meena	Indian National Congress
15	Jhalawar	GEN	Vasundhara Raje	Bharatiya Janata Party
16	Banswara	ST	Mahendrajeet Singh Malviya	Indian National Congress
17	Salumber	ST	Bheru Lal Meena	Indian National Congress
18	Udaipur	GEN	Shanti Lal Chaplot	Bharatiya Janata Party
19	Chittorgarh	GEN	Udai Lal Anjana	Indian National Congress
20	Bhilwara	GEN	Rampal Upadhyay	Indian National Congress
21	Pali	GEN	Mitha Lal Jain	Indian National Congress
22	Jalore	SC	Sardar Buta Singh	Independent
23	Barmer	GEN	Sona Ram	Indian National Congress
24	Jodhpur	GEN	Ashok Gehlot	Indian National Congress
25	Nagaur	GEN	Ram Raghunath Chaudhary	Indian National Congress

== Sikkim ==
No.	Constituency	Type	Name of Elected M.P.	Party affiliation
1	Sikkim	GEN	Bhim Prasad Dahal	Sikkim Democratic Front

== Tamil Nadu ==
No.	Constituency	Type	Name of Elected M.P.	Party affiliation
1	Madras North	GEN	C. Kuppusami	Dravida Munnetra Kazhagam
2	Madras Central	GEN	Murasoli Maran	Dravida Munnetra Kazhagam
3	Madras South	GEN	T. R. Baalu	Dravida Munnetra Kazhagam
4	Sriperumbudur	SC	K. Venugopal	All India Anna Dravida Munnetra Kazhagam
5	Chengalpattu	GEN	Kanchi Panneerselvam	All India Anna Dravida Munnetra Kazhagam
6	Arakkonam	GEN	C. Gopal Mudaliyar	All India Anna Dravida Munnetra Kazhagam
7	Vellore	GEN	N. T. Shanmugam	Pattali Makkal Katchi
8	Tiruppattur	GEN	D. Venugopal	Dravida Munnetra Kazhagam
9	Vandavasi	GEN	M. Durai	Pattali Makkal Katchi
10	Tindivanam	GEN	Gingee N. Ramachandran	Marumalarchi Dravida Munnetra Kazhagam
11	Cuddalore	GEN	M. C. Dhamodaran	All India Anna Dravida Munnetra Kazhagam
12	Chidambaram	SC	Dalit Ezhilmalai	Pattali Makkal Katchi
13	Dharmapuri	GEN	K. Pary Mohan	Pattali Makkal Katchi
14	Krishnagiri	GEN	K. P. Munusamy	All India Anna Dravida Munnetra Kazhagam
15	Rasipuram	SC	V. Saroja	All India Anna Dravida Munnetra Kazhagam
16	Salem	GEN	Vazhappady K. Ramamurthy	Independent
17	Tiruchengode	GEN	K. Palaniswamy	All India Anna Dravida Munnetra Kazhagam
18	Nilgiris	GEN	Master Mathan	Bharatiya Janata Party
19	Gobichettipalayam	GEN	V. K. Chinnasamy	All India Anna Dravida Munnetra Kazhagam
20	Coimbatore	GEN	C. P. Radhakrishnan	Bharatiya Janata Party
21	Pollachi	SC	M. Thiyagarajan	All India Anna Dravida Munnetra Kazhagam
22	Palani	GEN	A. Ganeshamurthi	Marumalarchi Dravida Munnetra Kazhagam
23	Dindigul	GEN	C. Sreenivaasan	All India Anna Dravida Munnetra Kazhagam
24	Madurai	GEN	Subramanian Swamy	Janata Party
25	Periyakulam	GEN	R. Muthiah	All India Anna Dravida Munnetra Kazhagam
26	Karur	GEN	M. Thambi Durai	All India Anna Dravida Munnetra Kazhagam
27	Tiruchirappalli	GEN	Rangarajan Kumaramangalam	Bharatiya Janata Party
28	Perambalur	SC	P. Rajarethinam	All India Anna Dravida Munnetra Kazhagam
29	Mayiladuthurai	GEN	K. Krishnamoorthy	Tamil Maanila Congress
30	Nagapattinam	SC	M. Selvarasu	Communist Party of India
31	Thanjavur	GEN	S. S. Palanimanickam	Dravida Munnetra Kazhagam
32	Pudukkottai	GEN	Raja Paramasivam	All India Anna Dravida Munnetra Kazhagam
33	Sivaganga	GEN	P. Chidambaram	Tamil Maanila Congress
34	Ramanathapuram	GEN	V. Sathiamoorthy	All India Anna Dravida Munnetra Kazhagam
35	Sivakasi	GEN	Vaiko	Marumalarchi Dravida Munnetra Kazhagam
36	Tirunelveli	GEN	M. R. Kadambur Janarthanan	All India Anna Dravida Munnetra Kazhagam
37	Tenkasi	SC	S. Murugesan	All India Anna Dravida Munnetra Kazhagam
38	Tiruchendur	GEN	Ramarajan	All India Anna Dravida Munnetra Kazhagam
39	Nagercoil	GEN	N. Dennis	Tamil Maanila Congress

== Tripura ==
CPI(M) (2)

#	Constituency	Name	Party
1	Tripura West	Samar Chowdhury	Communist Party of India (Marxist)
2	Tripura East (ST)	Baju Ban Riyan	Communist Party of India (Marxist)

== Uttar Pradesh ==
BJP (57) SP (20) BSP (4) SAP (2) SJP (1) IND (1)

#	Constituency	Name	Party
1	Tehri Garhwal	Manabendra Shah	Bharatiya Janata Party
2	Garhwal	B. C. Khanduri	Bharatiya Janata Party
3	Almora	Bachi Singh Rawat	Bharatiya Janata Party
4	Nainital	Ila Pant	Bharatiya Janata Party
5	Bijnor (SC)	Omvati Devi	Samajwadi Party
6	Amroha	Chetan Chauhan	Bharatiya Janata Party
7	Moradabad	Shafiqur Rahman Barq	Samajwadi Party
8	Rampur	Mukhtar Abbas Naqvi	Bharatiya Janata Party
9	Sambhal	Mulayam Singh Yadav	Samajwadi Party
10	Budaun	Saleem Iqbal Shervani	Samajwadi Party
11	Aonla	Raj Veer Singh	Bharatiya Janata Party
12	Bareilly	Santosh Gangwar	Bharatiya Janata Party
13	Pilibhit	Maneka Gandhi	Independent politician
14	Shahjahanpur	Satyapal Yadav	Bharatiya Janata Party
15	Kheri	Ravi Prakash Verma	Samajwadi Party
16	Shahabad	Raghvendra Singh	Bharatiya Janata Party
17	Sitapur	Janardan Prasad Mishra	Bharatiya Janata Party
18	Misrikh (SC)	Ram Shankar Bhargava	Bahujan Samaj Party
19	Hardoi (SC)	Usha Verma	Samajwadi Party
20	Lucknow	Atal Bihari Vajpayee	Bharatiya Janata Party
21	Mohanlalganj (SC)	Reena Choudhary	Samajwadi Party
22	Unnao	Devi Bux Singh	Bharatiya Janata Party
23	Rae Bareli	Ashok Singh	Bharatiya Janata Party
24	Pratapgarh	Ram Vilas Vedanti	Bharatiya Janata Party
25	Amethi	Sanjaya Sinh	Bharatiya Janata Party
26	Sultanpur	Devendra Bahadur Roy	Bharatiya Janata Party
27	Akbarpur (SC)	Mayawati	Bahujan Samaj Party
28	Faizabad	Mitrasen Yadav	Samajwadi Party
29	Bara Banki (SC)	Baij Nath Rawat	Bharatiya Janata Party
30	Kaiserganj	Beni Prasad Verma	Samajwadi Party
31	Bahraich	Arif Mohammad Khan	Bahujan Samaj Party
32	Balrampur	Rizwan Zaheer	Samajwadi Party
33	Gonda	Kirti Vardhan Singh	Samajwadi Party
34	Basti (SC)	Sriram Chauhan	Bharatiya Janata Party
35	Domariaganj	Rampal Singh	Bharatiya Janata Party
36	Khalilabad	Indrajeet Mishra	Bharatiya Janata Party
37	Bansgaon (SC)	Raj Narain Passi	Bharatiya Janata Party
38	Gorakhpur	Yogi Adityanath	Bharatiya Janata Party
39	Maharajganj	Pankaj Chaudhary	Bharatiya Janata Party
40	Padrauna	Ram Nagina Mishra	Bharatiya Janata Party
41	Deoria	Mohan Singh	Samajwadi Party
42	Salempur	Hari Kewal Prasad	Samata Party
43	Ballia	Chandra Shekhar	Samajwadi Janata Party
44	Ghosi	Kalpnath Rai	Samata Party
45	Azamgarh	Akbar Ahmad Dumpy	Bahujan Samaj Party
46	Lalganj (SC)	Daroga Prasad Saroj	Samajwadi Party
47	Machhlishahr	Swami Chinmayanand	Bharatiya Janata Party
48	Jaunpur	Parasnath Yadav	Samajwadi Party
49	Saidpur (SC)	Bizay Sonkar Shastri	Bharatiya Janata Party
50	Ghazipur	Omprakash Singh	Samajwadi Party
51	Chandauli	Ananda Ratna Maurya	Bharatiya Janata Party
52	Varanasi	Shankar Prasad Jaiswal	Bharatiya Janata Party
53	Robertsganj (SC)	Ram Shakal	Bharatiya Janata Party
54	Mirzapur	Virendra Singh	Bharatiya Janata Party
55	Phulpur	Jang Bahadur Patel	Samajwadi Party
56	Allahabad	Murli Manohar Joshi	Bharatiya Janata Party
57	Chail (SC)	Shailendra Kumar	Samajwadi Party
58	Fatehpur	Ashok Kumar Patel	Bharatiya Janata Party
59	Banda	Ramesh Chandra Dwivedi	Bharatiya Janata Party
60	Hamirpur	Ganga Charan Rajput	Bharatiya Janata Party
61	Jhansi	Rajendra Agnihotri	Bharatiya Janata Party
62	Jalaun (SC)	Bhanu Pratap Singh Verma	Bharatiya Janata Party
63	Ghatampur (SC)	Kamal Rani Varun	Bharatiya Janata Party
64	Bilhaur	Shyam Bihari Misra	Bharatiya Janata Party
65	Kanpur	Jagatvir Singh Drona	Bharatiya Janata Party
66	Etawah	Sukhda Misra	Bharatiya Janata Party
67	Kannauj	Pradeep Kumar Yadav	Samajwadi Party
68	Farrukhabad	Sakshi Maharaj	Bharatiya Janata Party
69	Mainpuri	Balram Yadav	Samajwadi Party
70	Jalesar	S. P. Singh Baghel	Samajwadi Party
71	Etah	Mahadeepak Shakya	Bharatiya Janata Party
72	Firozabad (SC)	Prabhu Dayal Katheria	Bharatiya Janata Party
73	Agra	Bhagwan Shankar Rawat	Bharatiya Janata Party
74	Mathura	Chaudhary Tejveer Singh	Bharatiya Janata Party
75	Hathras (SC)	Kishan Lal Diler	Bharatiya Janata Party
76	Aligarh	Sheela Gautam	Bharatiya Janata Party
77	Khurja (SC)	Ashok Kumar Pradhan	Bharatiya Janata Party
78	Bulandshahr	Chhatrapal Singh Lodha	Bharatiya Janata Party
79	Hapur	Ramesh Chand Tomar	Bharatiya Janata Party
80	Meerut	Amar Pal Singh	Bharatiya Janata Party
81	Baghpat	Sompal Shastri	Bharatiya Janata Party
82	Muzaffarnagar	Sohanveer Singh	Bharatiya Janata Party
83	Kairana	Virendra Verma	Bharatiya Janata Party
84	Saharanpur	Nakli Singh	Bharatiya Janata Party
85	Hardwar (SC)	Harpal Singh Sathi	Bharatiya Janata Party

== West Bengal ==
CPI(M) (24) AITC (7) RSP (4) CPI (3) AIFB (2) INC (1) BJP (1)

#	Constituency	Name	Party
1	Cooch Behar (SC)	Amar Roy Pradhan	All India Forward Bloc
2	Alipurduars (ST)	Joachim Baxla	Revolutionary Socialist Party
3	Jalpaiguri	Minati Sen	Communist Party of India (Marxist)
4	Darjeeling	Ananda Pathak	Communist Party of India (Marxist)
5	Raiganj	Subrata Mukherjee	Communist Party of India (Marxist)
6	Balurghat (SC)	Ranen Barman	Revolutionary Socialist Party
7	Malda	A. B. A. Ghani Khan Ch.	Indian National Congress
8	Jangipur	Abul Hasnat Khan	Communist Party of India (Marxist)
9	Murshidabad	Moinul Hassan	Communist Party of India (Marxist)
10	Berhampore	Promothes Mukherjee	Revolutionary Socialist Party
11	Krishnagar	Ajoy Mukhopadhyay	Communist Party of India (Marxist)
12	Nabadwip (SC)	Asim Bala	Communist Party of India (Marxist)
13	Barasat	Ranjit Kumar Panja	All India Trinamool Congress
14	Basirhat	Ajay Chakraborty	Communist Party of India
15	Joynagar (SC)	Sanat Kumar Mandal	Revolutionary Socialist Party
16	Mathurapur (SC)	Radhika Ranjan Pramanik	Communist Party of India (Marxist)
17	Diamond Harbour	Samik Lahiri	Communist Party of India (Marxist)
18	Jadavpur	Krishna Bose	All India Trinamool Congress
19	Barrackpore	Tarit Baran Topdar	Communist Party of India (Marxist)
20	Dum Dum	Tapan Sikdar	Bharatiya Janata Party
21	Calcutta North West	Sudip Bandyopadhyay	All India Trinamool Congress
22	Calcutta North East	Ajit Kumar Panja	All India Trinamool Congress
23	Calcutta South	Mamata Banerjee	All India Trinamool Congress
24	Howrah	Bikram Sarkar	All India Trinamool Congress
25	Uluberia	Hannan Mollah	Communist Party of India (Marxist)
26	Serampore	Akbar Ali Khondkar	All India Trinamool Congress
27	Hooghly	Rupchand Pal	Communist Party of India (Marxist)
28	Arambagh	Anil Basu	Communist Party of India (Marxist)
29	Panskura	Geeta Mukherjee	Communist Party of India
30	Tamluk	Lakshman Chandra Seth	Communist Party of India (Marxist)
31	Contai	Sudhir Kumar Giri	Communist Party of India (Marxist)
32	Midnapore	Indrajit Gupta	Communist Party of India
33	Jhargram (ST)	Rupchand Murmu	Communist Party of India (Marxist)
34	Purulia	Bir Singh Mahato	All India Forward Bloc
35	Bankura	Basudeb Acharia	Communist Party of India (Marxist)
36	Vishnupur (SC)	Sandhya Bauri	Communist Party of India (Marxist)
37	Durgapur (SC)	Sunil Khan	Communist Party of India (Marxist)
38	Asansol	Bikash Chowdhury	Communist Party of India (Marxist)
39	Burdwan	Nikhilananda Sar	Communist Party of India (Marxist)
40	Katwa	Mahboob Zahedi	Communist Party of India (Marxist)
41	Bolpur	Somnath Chatterjee	Communist Party of India (Marxist)
42	Birbhum (SC)	Ram Chandra Dome	Communist Party of India (Marxist)

== Andaman & Nicobar Islands ==
INC (1)

#	Constituency	Name	Party
1	Andaman & Nicobar Islands	Manoranjan Bhakta	Indian National Congress

== Chandigarh ==
BJP (1)

#	Constituency	Name	Party
1	Chandigarh	Satya Pal Jain	Bharatiya Janata Party

== Dadra & Nagar Haveli ==
BJP (1)

#	Constituency	Name	Party
1	Dadra & Nagar Haveli (ST)	Delkar Mohanbhai Sanjibhai	Bharatiya Janata Party

== Daman & Diu ==
BJP (1)

#	Constituency	Name	Party
1	Daman and Diu	Tandel Devji Jogibhai	Bharatiya Janata Party

== National Capital Territory of Delhi ==
BJP (6) INC (1)

#	Constituency	Name	Party
1	New Delhi	Jagmohan	Bharatiya Janata Party
2	South Delhi	Sushma Swaraj	Bharatiya Janata Party
3	Outer Delhi	Krishan Lal Sharma	Bharatiya Janata Party
4	East Delhi	Lal Bihari Tiwari	Bharatiya Janata Party
5	Chandni Chowk	Vijay Goel	Bharatiya Janata Party
6	Delhi Sadar	Madan Lal Khurana	Bharatiya Janata Party
7	Karol Bagh (SC)	Meira Kumar	Indian National Congress

== Lakshadweep ==
INC (1)

#	Constituency	Name	Party
1	Lakshadweep (ST)	P. M. Sayeed	Indian National Congress

== Pondicherry ==
DMK (1)

#	Constituency	Name	Party
1	Pondicherry	S. Arumugham	Dravida Munnetra Kazhagam
