= All India Indira Congress =

All India Indira Congress may refer to:Indian National Congress (Indira)

Other Parties

- All India Indira Congress (Tiwari)
- All India Indira Congress (Secular)
