= 13th Lok Sabha =

Lower House members elected in 1999

←	12th	14th	→
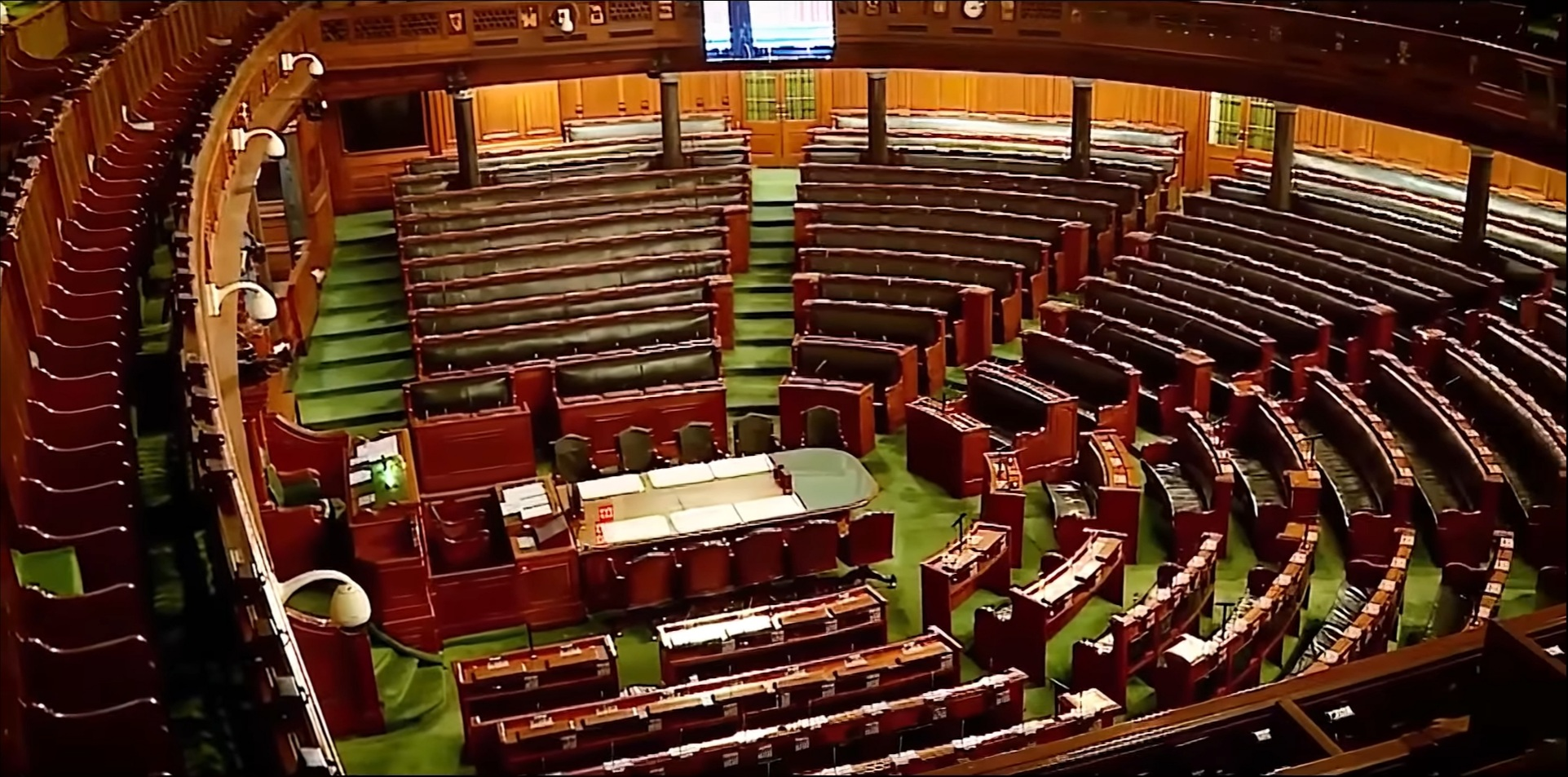
- View of Lok Sabha chamber in the Old Parliament House, New Delhi

Overview
- Legislative body: Indian Parliament
- Election: 1999 Indian general election

The 13th Lok Sabha (20 October 1999 – 6 February 2004) is the thirteenth session of the Lok Sabha (House of the People, or lower house in the Parliament of India). It was convened after 1999 Indian general election held during September–October 1999.

This majority group in the Lok Sabha during this period was the National Democratic Alliance, a nationalist group led by the Bharatiya Janata Party, which won 270 seats, 16 more than 12th Lok Sabha. The NDA, under the leadership of Atal Bihari Vajpayee completed its term until the next general elections of May 2004 for the next 14th Lok Sabha. This was the first non-INC government to complete the full term.

Four sitting members from Rajya Sabha, the Upper House of Indian Parliament, were elected to 13th Lok Sabha after the 1999 Indian general election.

== Important members ==
- Speaker:
  - G. M. C. Balayogi from 22 October 1999 to 3 March 2002
  - Manohar Joshi from 10 May 2002 to 2 June 2004
- Deputy Speaker:
  - P M Sayeed from 27 October 1999 to 2 June 2004
- Secretary General:
  - G C Malhotra from 14 July 1999 to 28 July 2005
- Leader of the House
  - Atal Bihari Vajpayee (13 October 1999 to 6 February 2004)
- Leader of the Opposition
  - Sonia Gandhi(13 October 1999 to 6 February 2004)
- Minister of Parliamentary Affairs
  - Pramod Mahajan (13 October 1999 to 29 January 2003)
  - Sushma Swaraj (29 January 2003 to 22 May 2004)

== List of members by political party ==
S.No.	Party name	Party flag	Number of MPs	Leader of Lok Sabha
1	Bharatiya Janata Party (BJP)		186	Atal Bihari Vajpayee
2	Indian National Congress (INC)		112	Sonia Gandhi
3	Communist Party of India (Marxist) (CPI(M))		33	Somnath Chatterjee
4	Telugu Desam Party (TDP)		29	Kinjarapu Yerran Naidu
5	Samajwadi Party (SP)		26	
6	Janata Dal (United) (JD(U))		21	
7	Shiv Sena (SS)		15	
8	Bahujan Samaj Party (BSP)		14	
9	Dravida Munnetra Kazhagam (DMK)		12	
10	All India Anna Dravida Munnetra Kazhagam (AIADMK)		10	
11	Biju Janata Dal (BJD)		10	
12	All India Trinamool Congress (AITC)		8	
13	Nationalist Congress Party (NCP)		8	
14	Pattali Makkal Katchi (PMK)		8	
15	Rashtriya Janata Dal (RJD)		7	
16	Independent (Ind.)		6	
17	Indian National Lok Dal (INLD)	INLD party symbol	5	
18	Communist Party of India (CPI)		4	
19	Jammu and Kashmir National Conference (J&KNC)		4	
20	Marumalarchi Dravida Munnetra Kazhagam (MDMK)		4	
21	Revolutionary Socialist Party (India) (RSP)		3	
22	Akhil Bharatiya Lok Tantrik Congress (ABLTC)		2	
23	All India Forward Bloc (AIFB)		2	
24	Indian Union Muslim League (IUML)		2	
25	Rashtriya Lok Dal (RLD)		2	
26	Shiromani Akali Dal (SAD)		2	
27	All India Majlis-e-Ittehadul Muslimeen (AIMIM)		1	
28	Bharipa Bahujan Mahasangha (BBM)		1	
29	Communist Party of India (Marxist–Leninist) Liberation (CPI(ML)L)		1	
30	Himachal Vikas Congress (HVC)		1	
31	Janata Dal (Secular) (JD(S))		1	
32	Kerala Congress (M) (KC(M))	Kerala Congress(m) Flag	1	
33	MGR Anna Dravida Munnetra Kazhagam (MADMK)		1	
34	Manipur State Congress Party (MSCP)		1	
35	Peasants and Workers Party of India (PAWPI)		1	
36	Shiromani Akali Dal (Simranjit Singh Mann) (SAD(M))		1	
37	Sikkim Democratic Front (SDF)		1	
38	Samajwadi Janata Party (Rashtriya) (SJP(R))		1	

== Key ==
Female: 49 (9.02%)	Male: 494 (90.98%)
SC: Seat reserved for Scheduled Castes
ST: Seat reserved for Scheduled Tribes

== Cabinet Ministers ==
Portfolio	Minister	Took office	Left office	Party	Remarks
Prime Minister and also in-charge of: Ministry of Planning; Department of Atomic Energy; Department of Space	Atal Bihari Vajpayee	13 October 1999	22 May 2004	BJP	All other important portfolios and policy issues not allocated to any Minister.
Deputy Prime Minister	L. K. Advani	29 June 2002	22 May 2004	BJP	
Minister of Home Affairs	L. K. Advani	13 October 1999	22 May 2004	BJP	
Minister of Personnel, Public Grievances and Pensions	Atal Bihari Vajpayee	13 October 1999	29 January 2003	BJP	Prime Minister was responsible.
Minister of Personnel, Public Grievances and Pensions	L. K. Advani	29 January 2003	22 May 2004	BJP	
Minister of External Affairs	Jaswant Singh	13 October 1999	1 July 2002	BJP	
Minister of External Affairs	Yashwant Sinha	1 July 2002	22 May 2004	BJP	
Minister of Finance	Yashwant Sinha	13 October 1999	1 July 2002	BJP	Renamed as Finance and Company Affairs.
Minister of Finance and Company Affairs	Jaswant Singh	1 July 2002	22 May 2004	BJP	
Minister of Defence	George Fernandes	13 October 1999	16 March 2001	SAP	
Minister of Defence	Atal Bihari Vajpayee	16 March 2001	18 March 2001	BJP	Prime Minister was responsible.
Minister of Defence	Jaswant Singh	18 March 2001	15 October 2001	BJP	Additional charge.
Minister of Defence	George Fernandes	15 October 2001	22 May 2004	JD(U)	
Minister of Human Resource Development; Minister of Science and Technology	Murli Manohar Joshi	13 October 1999	22 May 2004	BJP	
Minister of Ocean Development	Atal Bihari Vajpayee	13 October 1999	22 November 1999	BJP	Prime Minister was responsible.
Minister of Ocean Development	Murli Manohar Joshi	22 November 1999	22 May 2004	BJP	
Minister of Statistics and Programme Implementation	Atal Bihari Vajpayee	13 October 1999	1 September 2001	BJP	Prime Minister was responsible.
Minister of Statistics and Programme Implementation	Jagmohan	1 September 2001	18 November 2001	BJP	
Minister of Statistics and Programme Implementation	Vikram Verma	18 November 2001	1 July 2002	BJP	Minister of State (I/C) was responsible.
Minister of Statistics and Programme Implementation	Atal Bihari Vajpayee	1 July 2002	22 May 2004	BJP	Prime Minister was responsible.
Minister of Agriculture	Atal Bihari Vajpayee	13 October 1999	22 November 1999	BJP	Prime Minister was responsible.
Minister of Agriculture	Nitish Kumar	22 November 1999	3 March 2001	SAP	
Minister of Agriculture	Atal Bihari Vajpayee	3 March 2001	6 March 2001	BJP	Prime Minister was responsible.
Minister of Agriculture	Sundar Lal Patwa	6 March 2001	27 May 2001	BJP	
Minister of Agriculture	Nitish Kumar	27 May 2001	22 July 2001	SAP	
Minister of Agriculture	Ajit Singh	22 July 2001	24 May 2003	RLD	
Minister of Agriculture	Rajnath Singh	24 May 2003	22 May 2004	BJP	
Minister of Labour	Atal Bihari Vajpayee	13 October 1999	22 November 1999	BJP	Prime Minister was responsible.
Minister of Labour	Satyanarayan Jatiya	22 November 1999	1 September 2001	BJP	
Minister of Labour	Sharad Yadav	1 September 2001	1 July 2002	SAP	
Minister of Labour	Sahib Singh Verma	1 July 2002	22 May 2004	BJP	
Minister of Water Resources	Pramod Mahajan	13 October 1999	22 November 1999	BJP	
Minister of Water Resources	C. P. Thakur	22 November 1999	27 May 2000	BJP	
Minister of Water Resources	Arjun Charan Sethi	27 May 2000	22 May 2004	BJD	
Minister of Consumer Affairs and Public Distribution	Shanta Kumar	13 October 1999	17 July 2000	BJP	Renamed as Consumer Affairs, Food and Public Distribution.
Minister of Consumer Affairs, Food and Public Distribution	Shanta Kumar	17 July 2000	1 July 2002	BJP	
Minister of Consumer Affairs, Food and Public Distribution	Sharad Yadav	1 July 2002	22 May 2004	JD(U)	
Minister of Food Processing Industries	Chaman Lal Gupta	1 September 2001	1 July 2002	BJP	Minister of State (I/C) was responsible.
Minister of Food Processing Industries	N. T. Shanmugam	1 July 2002	15 January 2004	PMK	Minister of State (I/C) was responsible.
Minister of Food Processing Industries	Atal Bihari Vajpayee	15 January 2004	17 January 2004	BJP	Prime Minister was responsible.
Minister of Food Processing Industries	Rajnath Singh	17 January 2004	22 May 2004	BJP	
Minister of Health and Family Welfare	N. T. Shanmugam	13 October 1999	27 May 2000	PMK	Minister of State (I/C) was responsible.
Minister of Health and Family Welfare	C. P. Thakur	27 May 2000	1 July 2002	BJP	
Minister of Health and Family Welfare	Shatrughan Sinha	1 July 2002	29 January 2003	BJP	
Minister of Health and Family Welfare	Sushma Swaraj	29 January 2003	22 May 2004	BJP	
Minister of Railways	Mamata Banerjee	13 October 1999	16 March 2001	AITC	
Minister of Railways	Atal Bihari Vajpayee	16 March 2001	20 March 2001	BJP	Prime Minister was responsible.
Minister of Railways	Nitish Kumar	20 March 2001	22 May 2004	JD(U)	
Minister of Civil Aviation	Sharad Yadav	13 October 1999	1 September 2001	SAP	
Minister of Civil Aviation	Syed Shahnawaz Hussain	1 September 2001	24 May 2003	BJP	
Minister of Civil Aviation	Rajiv Pratap Rudy	24 May 2003	22 May 2004	BJP	Minister of State (I/C) was responsible.
Minister of Surface Transport	Nitish Kumar	13 October 1999	22 November 1999	SAP	
Minister of Surface Transport	Rajnath Singh	22 November 1999	25 October 2000	BJP	
Minister of Surface Transport	Atal Bihari Vajpayee	25 October 2000	7 November 2000	BJP	Prime Minister was responsible. Bifurcated into Ministry of Road Transport and Highways and Ministry of Shipping.
Minister of Road Transport and Highways	B. C. Khanduri	7 November 2000	24 May 2003	BJP	Minister of State (I/C) was responsible.
Minister of Road Transport and Highways	B. C. Khanduri	24 May 2003	22 May 2004	BJP	
Minister of Shipping	Arun Jaitley	7 November 2000	1 September 2001	BJP	Minister of State (I/C) was responsible.
Minister of Shipping	Ved Prakash Goyal	1 September 2001	29 January 2003	BJP	
Minister of Shipping	Shatrughan Sinha	29 January 2003	22 May 2004	BJP	
Minister of Rural Development	Sundar Lal Patwa	13 October 1999	30 September 2000	BJP	
Minister of Rural Development	M. Venkaiah Naidu	30 September 2000	1 July 2002	BJP	
Minister of Rural Development	Shanta Kumar	1 July 2002	6 April 2003	BJP	
Minister of Rural Development	Ananth Kumar	6 April 2003	24 May 2003	BJP	
Minister of Rural Development	Kashiram Rana	24 May 2003	22 May 2004	BJP	
Minister of Urban Development	Jagmohan	13 October 1999	22 November 1999	BJP	
Minister of Urban Development	Jagmohan	26 November 1999	27 May 2000	BJP	Merged with Ministry of Urban Employment and Poverty; Alleviation to form the Ministry of Urban Development and Poverty Alleviation.
Minister of Urban Employment and Poverty Alleviation	Satyanarayan Jatiya	13 October 1999	22 November 1999	BJP	
Minister of Urban Employment and Poverty Alleviation	Jagmohan	22 November 1999	26 November 1999	BJP	
Minister of Urban Employment and Poverty Alleviation	Sukhdev Singh Dhindsa	26 November 1999	27 May 2000	BJP	Merged with Ministry of Urban Development to form the Ministry of Urban Development and Poverty Alleviation.
Minister of Works and Estates	Sukhdev Singh Dhindsa	22 November 1999	26 November 1999	SAD	Merged with Ministry of Urban Development.
Minister of Urban Development and Poverty Alleviation	Jagmohan	27 May 2000	1 September 2001	BJP	
Minister of Urban Development and Poverty Alleviation	Ananth Kumar	1 September 2001	12 July 2003	BJP	
Minister of Urban Development and Poverty Alleviation	B. C. Khanduri	12 July 2003	8 September 2000	BJP	
Minister of Urban Development and Poverty Alleviation	Bandaru Dattatreya	8 September 2003	22 May 2004	BJP	Minister of State (I/C) was responsible.
Minister of Commerce and Industry	Murasoli Maran	13 October 1999	9 November 2002	DMK	
Minister of Commerce and Industry	Arun Shourie	9 July 2002	29 January 2003	BJP	
Minister of Commerce and Industry	Arun Jaitley	29 January 2003	22 May 2004	BJP	
Minister of Heavy Industries and Public Enterprises	Manohar Joshi	13 October 1999	9 May 2002	SS	
Minister of Heavy Industries and Public Enterprises	Suresh Prabhu	9 May 2002	1 July 2002	SS	
Minister of Heavy Industries and Public Enterprises	Balasaheb Vikhe Patil	1 July 2002	24 May 2003	SS	
Minister of Heavy Industries and Public Enterprises	Subodh Mohite	24 May 2003	22 May 2004	SS	
Minister of Small Scale Industries, Agro and Rural Industries	Vasundhara Raje	13 October 1999	1 September 2001	BJP	Minister of State (I/C) was responsible. Bifurcated into Ministry of Small Scale Industries and Ministry of Agro and Rural Industries.
Minister of Small Scale Industries	Vasundhara Raje	1 September 2001	29 January 2003	BJP	Minister of State (I/C) was responsible.
Minister of Small Scale Industries	C. P. Thakur	29 January 2003	22 May 2004	BJP	
Minister of Agro and Rural Industries	Kariya Munda	1 September 2001	29 January 2003	BJP	
Minister of Agro and Rural Industries	Sangh Priya Gautam	29 January 2003	22 May 2004	BJP	Minister of State (I/C) was responsible.
Minister of Textiles	Kashiram Rana	13 October 1999	24 May 2003	BJP	
Minister of Textiles	Syed Shahnawaz Hussain	24 May 2003	22 May 2004	BJP	
Minister of Petroleum and Natural Gas	Ram Naik	13 October 1999	22 May 2004	BJP	
Minister of Chemicals and Fertilizers	Suresh Prabhu	13 October 1999	30 September 2000	SS	
Minister of Chemicals and Fertilizers	Sundar Lal Patwa	30 September 2000	7 November 2000	BJP	
Minister of Chemicals and Fertilizers	Sukhdev Singh Dhindsa	7 November 2000	22 May 2004	SAD	
Minister of Mines and Minerals	Naveen Patnaik	13 October 1999	4 March 2000	BJD	Resigned after elected as Orissa CM
Minister of Mines and Minerals	Atal Bihari Vajpayee	4 March 2000	6 March 2000	BJP	Prime Minister was responsible.
Minister of Mines and Minerals	P. R. Kumaramangalam	6 March 2000	27 May 2000	BJP	Bifurcated into Ministry of Mines and Ministry of Coal.
Minister of Mines	Sukhdev Singh Dhindsa	27 May 2000	7 November 2000	SAD	
Minister of Mines	Sundar Lal Patwa	7 November 2000	1 September 2001	BJP	
Minister of Mines	Ram Vilas Paswan	1 September 2001	29 April 2002	LJP	
Minister of Mines	Atal Bihari Vajpayee	29 April 2002	1 July 2002	BJP	Prime Minister was responsible.
Minister of Mines	L. K. Advani	1 July 2002	26 August 2002	BJP	
Minister of Mines	Uma Bharti	26 August 2002	29 January 2003	BJP	
Minister of Mines	Ramesh Bais	29 January 2003	9 January 2004	BJP	Minister of State (I/C) was responsible.
Minister of Mines	Mamata Banerjee	9 January 2004	22 May 2004	AITC	
Minister of Coal	N. T. Shanmugam	27 May 2000	7 February 2001	PMK	Minister of State (I/C) was responsible.
Minister of Coal	Syed Shahnawaz Hussain	8 February 2001	1 September 2001	BJP	Minister of State (I/C) was responsible.
Minister of Coal	Ram Vilas Paswan	1 September 2001	29 April 2002	LJP	
Minister of Coal	Atal Bihari Vajpayee	29 April 2002	1 July 2002	BJP	Prime Minister was responsible.
Minister of Coal	L. K. Advani	1 July 2002	26 August 2002	BJP	
Minister of Coal	Uma Bharti	26 August 2002	29 January 2003	BJP	
Minister of Coal	Kariya Munda	29 January 2003	9 January 2004	BJP	
Minister of Coal	Mamata Banerjee	9 January 2004	22 May 2004	AITC	
Minister of Power	P. R. Kumaramangalam	13 October 1999	23 August 2000	BJP	Died in office.
Minister of Power	Atal Bihari Vajpayee	23 August 2000	30 September 2000	BJP	Prime Minister was responsible.
Minister of Power	Suresh Prabhu	30 September 2000	24 August 2002	SS	
Minister of Power	Atal Bihari Vajpayee	24 August 2002	26 August 2002	BJP	Prime Minister was responsible.
Minister of Power	Anant Geete	26 August 2002	22 May 2004	SS	
Minister of Non-Conventional Energy Sources	M. Kannappan	13 October 1999	30 December 2003	DMK	Minister of State (I/C) was responsible.
Minister of Non-Conventional Energy Sources	Atal Bihari Vajpayee	30 December 2003	9 January 2004	BJP	Prime Minister was responsible.
Minister of Non-Conventional Energy Sources	Kariya Munda	9 January 2004	22 May 2004	BJP	
Minister of Parliamentary Affairs	Pramod Mahajan	13 October 1999	29 January 2003	BJP	
Minister of Parliamentary Affairs	Sushma Swaraj	29 January 2003	22 May 2004	BJP	
Minister of Law, Justice and Company Affairs	Ram Jethmalani	13 October 1999	23 July 2000	BJP	
Minister of Law, Justice and Company Affairs	Arun Jaitley	24 July 2000	1 July 2002	BJP	Minister of State (I/C) was responsible. Bifurcated into Ministry of Law and Justice and Department of Company Affairs.
Minister of Law and Justice	K. Jana Krishamurthy	1 July 2002	29 January 2003	BJP	
Minister of Law and Justice	Arun Jaitley	29 January 2003	22 May 2004	BJP	
Minister of Information and Broadcasting	Arun Jaitley	13 October 1999	30 September 2000	BJP	Minister of State (I/C) was responsible.
Minister of Information and Broadcasting	Sushma Swaraj	30 September 2000	29 January 2003	BJP	
Minister of Information and Broadcasting	Ravi Shankar Prasad	29 January 2003	22 May 2004	BJP	Minister of State (I/C) was responsible.
Minister of Communications	Ram Vilas Paswan	13 October 1999	1 September 2001	LJP	
Minister of Communications	Pramod Mahajan	22 November 1999	22 December 2001	BJP	Merged with Ministry of Information Technology to form Ministry of Communications and Information Technology.
Minister of Information Technology	Atal Bihari Vajpayee	13 October 1999	22 November 1999	BJP	Prime Minister was responsible.
Minister of Information Technology	Pramod Mahajan	22 November 1999	22 December 2001	BJP	Merged with Ministry of Communications to form Ministry of Communications and Information Technology.
Minister of Communications and Information Technology	Pramod Mahajan	22 December 2001	29 January 2003	BJP	
Minister of Communications and Information Technology	Arun Shourie	29 January 2003	22 May 2004	BJP	
Minister of Culture, Youth Affairs and Sports	Ananth Kumar	13 October 1999	2 February 2000	BJP	Bifurcated into Ministry of Youth Affairs and Sports and Ministry of Culture.
Minister of Youth Affairs and Sports	Sukhdev Singh Dhindsa	2 February 2000	7 November 2000	SAD	
Minister of Youth Affairs and Sports	Uma Bharti	7 November 2000	26 August 2002	BJP	
Minister of Youth Affairs and Sports	Vikram Verma	26 August 2002	22 May 2004	BJP	
Minister of Department of Culture	Ananth Kumar	2 February 2000	27 May 2000	BJP	Merged with Ministry of Tourism to form Ministry of Tourism and Culture.
Minister of Tourism	Uma Bharti	13 October 1999	2 February 2000	BJP	Minister of State (I/C) was responsible.
Minister of Tourism	Ananth Kumar	2 February 2000	27 May 2000	BJP	Merged with Department of Culture to form Ministry of Tourism and Culture.
Minister of Tourism and Culture	Ananth Kumar	27 May 2000	1 September 2001	BJP	Bifurcated into Ministry of Tourism and Ministry of Culture.
Minister of Culture	Maneka Gandhi	1 September 2001	18 November 2001	IND	Minister of State (I/C) was responsible. Merged with Ministry of Tourism to form Ministry of Tourism and Culture.
Minister of Tourism	Jagmohan	1 September 2001	18 November 2001	BJP	Merged with Ministry of Culture to form Ministry of Tourism and Culture.
Minister of Tourism and Culture	Jagmohan	18 November 2001	22 May 2004	BJP	
Minister of Environment and Forests	T. R. Baalu	13 October 1999	21 December 2003	DMK	
Minister of Environment and Forests	Atal Bihari Vajpayee	21 December 2003	9 January 2004	BJP	
Minister of Environment and Forests	Ramesh Bais	9 January 2004	22 May 2004	BJP	Minister of State (I/C) was responsible.
Minister of Social Justice and Empowerment	Maneka Gandhi	13 October 1999	1 September 2001	IND	Minister of State (I/C) was responsible.
Minister of Social Justice and Empowerment	Satyanarayan Jatiya	1 September 2001	22 May 2004	BJP	
Minister of Tribal Affairs	Jual Oram	13 October 1999	22 May 2004	BJP	
Minister of Disinvestment	Arun Jaitley	10 December 1999	24 July 2000	BJP	Minister of State (I/C) was responsible.
Minister of Disinvestment	Arun Shourie	24 July 2000	1 September 2001	BJP	Minister of State (I/C) was responsible.
Minister of Disinvestment	Arun Shourie	1 September 2001	22 May 2004	BJP	
Minister of Development of North Eastern Region	Arun Shourie	1 September 2001	29 January 2003	BJP	
Minister of Development of North Eastern Region	C. P. Thakur	29 January 2003	22 May 2004	BJP	
Minister without portfolio	Murasoli Maran	9 November 2002	23 November 2003	DMK	Died in office.
Minister without portfolio	Mamata Banerjee	8 September 2003	9 January 2004	AITC	
