= Ajoy Mukhopadhyay =

Indian politician (1928–2019)

Ajoy Mukhopadhyay (27 August 1928 Raruli, Khulna district, (now in Bangladesh) - 21 August 2019) was member of 9th Lok Sabha from Krishnanagar (Lok Sabha constituency) in West Bengal, India.

He was elected to 9th, 10th, 11th and 12th Lok Sabha from Krishanagar constituency in Nadia district. He died on 24 July 2019 at the age of 90.
