= B M Menasinakai =

Indian politician

B. M. Menasinakai (3 February 1926 – 17 January 2003) was a prominent Indian politician, agriculturist, and humanitarian from Karnataka. He is widely recognized for his service in both the state legislature and the national parliament, as well as for his extensive social work in healthcare, which earned him the popular moniker "Netradani" (Donor of Eyes).

== Early life and education ==
Born in Hakkur (or Akkur) village in the Haveri district of Karnataka, Menasinakai was the son of Shri Mallappa. He pursued his higher education at J.G. Commerce College in Hubli, where he earned a Bachelor of Commerce (B.Com.) degree. In his early years, he was an active participant in the Indian freedom struggle.

== Political career ==
Menasinakai's career spanned local and national levels, starting as President of the Haveri Municipality in 1979. He founded the Karnataka State Urban/Municipal Federation in 1985 and served as a Member of the Legislative Council (MLC) from 1988 to 1994. In 1998, he was elected to the 12th Lok Sabha from Dharwad South for the Lok Shakti party. During his term, he served on committees for commerce, textiles, and human resource development.

== Professional life and philanthropy ==
An Income Tax Practitioner and farmer by profession, Menasinakai was widely known for his humanitarian work. He established a Free Eye Hospital in Davanagere and operated a mobile eye clinic, earning him the title "Netradani" (Donor of Eyes). He was also the President of the Rotary Club in Haveri (1971–1978).

== Personal life ==
He was married to Smt. Shakuntala B. Mensinkai, he was a father to several children and enjoyed light music and badminton. He authored several publications, including Hundred letters to the Governor and My service in Legislature. Menasinakai passed away on 17 January 2003.
