= Vishno Datt Sharma =

Indian politician

Vishno Datt Sharma was a member of 13th Lok Sabha representing Jammu Parliamentary Constituency of Jammu & Kashmir state in India. He was also a member of Twelfth Lok Sabha during 1998–99. He was a member of Bharatiya Janata Party. Earlier, he was president, Municipal Council, Jammu in 1972. Sharma was a member of the Jammu and Kashmir Legislative Assembly from the Jammu East constituency in Jammu district.

An Ayurvedic medical practitioner by profession, he was awarded fellowship of National Council for Indian System of Medicine. He died in 2001.
