= G. C. Malhotra =

Indian civil servant (born 1943)

Shri G.C. Malhotra

Secretary General of Lok Sabha & Lok Sabha Secretariat

Personal details
- Born: 24 July 1943 (age 83) Lahore, Pakistan
- Spouse: Smt. Neelam Malhotra
- Children: 2 sons

Shri G.C. Malhotra (born 24 July 1943) is the former Secretary General of 12th Lok Sabha and 13th Lok Sabha and Lok Sabha Secretariat, Parliament of India, i.e. the House of the People (Lower House) in the Indian Parliament. As Secretary General, he is also the Administrative head of the Secretariat of the Lok Sabha. The post of Secretary General is of the rank of the Cabinet Secretary in the Government of India, who is the senior most civil servant to the Indian Government.

== Career and positions held ==
Mr. Malhotra holds M.A and LL.M degrees and joined the Lok Sabha Secretariat in 1970 and served in various capacities and became Secretary-General of Lok Sabha and Lok Sabha Secretariat on 14 July 1999. He was also secretary-general, India Parliamentary Group; secretary, India Branch of C.P.A.; secretary-general, National Group of I.P.U; secretary-general, Asia Region of C.P.A.

== Book published and literary activities ==
- Motions of Confidence and No - Confidence
- Co-editor, Delhi Metropolitan Council: A Study, 1966–89
- Associate editor, Netaji and INA
- Constitution Amendment in India

and was editor of various periodicals and departmental publications of Lok Sabha Secretariat.
