= Syed Hussain =

Indian politician (born 1922)

Member of Legislative Assembly Jammu and Kashmir
- In office 1957–1962

Member of Rajya Sabha
- In office 16 April 1968 – 5 March 1974

Personal details
- Born: 16 July 1922 Mohalla Mir Maidan in Dooru—Near Verinag, District Anantnag
- Died: 2011
- Spouse: Farkhundah Begum
- Education: Kashmir University, Aligarh Muslim University

Syed Hussain (born 16 July 1922) is an Indian former politician who was Member of Parliament Rajya Sabha, and former Chairman of the Legislative Council of Jammu and Kashmir.

Hussain was born on 16 July 1922, in ancestral house in Mohalla Mir Maidan in Dooru—Near Verinag, District Anantnag. He holds a Bachelor of Arts [BA] (Kashmir University); Bachelor of Law [LLB] (Aligarh Muslim University); Mufti (Honours; in Persian and Arabic) Kashmir University

Hussain married Farkhundah Begum on 1 October 1940; they have four daughters.

Hussain is an advocate; was associated with Jammu and Kashmir National Conference from early student days; was arrested after sustaining serious injuries while leading a demonstration against autocratic rule in the state in 1946; took leading part in organizing popular resistance against Pak-invaders and infiltrators in 1947 and 1965 respectively; one of the founders of Democratic National Conference;

Hussain has been the member of:

- Executive Committee J&K Pradesh Congress.
- Congress Forum for Socialist action.
- Executive Committee of J &K, Unit of I.S.C.U.S and
- Central Citizen Committee;
- Debt Conciliation Board, 1949, 1950 and 1951;
- Legislative Assembly, Jammu and Kashmir, 1957 until 1962 and was elected to the J&K Legislative Council in 1962;
- Public Accounts Committee and Committee on Subordinate Legislation in J & K, Legislature
- Member Committee on Subordinate Legislation of the Rajya Sabha;
- Rajya Sabha from 16 April 1968 to 5 March 1974.

In 1975, he resigned as the chairman of the Legislative Council after his party lost its majority in the Council following assumption of Chief Ministership by Sheikh Abdullah.
