= Krishna Kumar Choudhary =

Indian politician

Member of Parliament, Lok Sabha
- In office 1998–1999
- Preceded by: Bhagwati Devi
- Succeeded by: Ramji Manjhi
- Constituency: Gaya

Personal details
- Born: 11 May 1962 (age 62); Manpur Mallah Toli, Gaya district, Bihar
- Political party: Bharatiya Janata Party
- Spouse: Meena Devi
- Children: 1 son
- Parent: Ram Chandra Chaudhary (father)
- Education: Bachelor of Commerce
- Alma mater: Ranchi University

Krishna Kumar Chaudhary was an Indian politician from Bihar who represented Gaya in the Lok Sabha from 1998 to 1999.
