= Ajaykumar Sambasadashiv Sarnaik =

Indian politician

Ajaykumar Sambasadashiv Sarnaik is an Indian politician who has a member of both the Karnataka Legislative Assembly and the Lok Sabha.

== Political career ==
His political journey is marked by his role in representing the Bagalkot region in both state and national legislatures. In 1994, he was elected as the Member of Legislative Assembly (MLA) for the Bagalkot constituency. Running for the Janata Dal, he achieved a significant victory, capturing 57% of the vote and defeating his nearest rival by a solid margin of 5,876 votes. As he transitioned into national politics, Sarnaik became a Member of Parliament (MP) after winning the Bagalkot Lok Sabha seat in the 1998 General Elections as a candidate for the Lok Shakti party. However, his later electoral attempts saw him changing party affiliations and facing different outcomes. In the 1999 Lok Sabha elections, he ran under the JD(U) banner but was defeated by R.S. Patil from the Indian National Congress (INC). He eventually joined the INC and contested the 2014 Lok Sabha elections, where he faced off against the BJP's Gaddigoudar Parvtagouda Chandanagouda, ultimately losing the race.

== Other roles ==
- Banking: He has served as the Chairman of the BDCC (Bagalkot District Central Co-operative) Bank.
