= Ram Raghunath Chaudhary =

Indian politician (1936–2007)

Member of Lok Sabha
- In office 1999–2004
- Preceded by: Bhanu Prakash Mirdha
- Succeeded by: Bhanwar Singh Dangawas
- Constituency: Nagaur Lok Sabha constituency

Member of the Rajasthan Legislative Assembly
- In office 1972–1985
- Succeeded by: Kalyan Singh
- Constituency: Degana Assembly constituency

Personal details
- Born: 1 January 1936 Nagaur district, Rajasthan
- Died: 6 April 2007 (aged 71)
- Party: Indian National Congress

Ram Raghunath Chaudhary (1 January 1936 – 6 April 2007) was an Indian politician from Nagaur, Rajasthan. He served as Member of Parliament, Lok Sabha representing Nagaur constituency for two terms from 1998 to 2004. He also served as member of Rajasthan Legislative Assembly representing Degana constituency from 1972 to 1985. He was a member of Indian National Congress.

== Early life ==
He was born on 1 January 1936 to Pusa Ram Chaudhary and Gauri Devi in Nagaur district.

== Political career ==
Chaudhary was born in Degana village in Nagaur district of Rajasthan on 18 August 1933, his father, Poosaram Chaudhary was involved in the farmer movements headed by Baldev Ram Mirdha. From then on, Ram Raghunath Chaudhary became passionate about fighting for farmers' rights in politics. Following the establishment of the Panchayati Raj system in 1959, he started his political career at the panchayat level and become the first head of Degana. He was the head once more, this time from 1965 to 1972. After joining the Congress party, he won three elections to the Degana assembly constituency as an MLA. He subsequently advanced to Parliament after winning the Lok Sabha elections from 1998 to 2004.

He earned his degree from Pilani Birla College. Chaudhary finished a year-long program course from the International Youth Exchange platform in addition to taking part in the agricultural exchange program in the United States. Furthermore, he brought up matters concerning farmers' welfare in his capacity as president of the Rajasthan Youth Farmers Forum. Ajay Singh Kilak, his son, is currently the minister of the same department; his father was the head of the Nagaur District Land Development Cooperative Bank.
