= Ramesh Chandra Dwivedi =

Indian politician

Member of Parliament, Lok Sabha
- In office 1998–1999
- Preceded by: Ram Sajeevan
- Succeeded by: Ram Sajeevan
- Constituency: Banda

Member of Uttar Pradesh Legislative Assembly
- In office 1991–1992
- Preceded by: Surender Pal Verma
- Succeeded by: Surender Pal Verma
- Constituency: Naraini

Personal details
- Born: 17 July 1951 (age 73); Mahila, Kaushambi district, Uttar Pradesh
- Political party: Bharatiya Janata Party
- Spouse: Geeta Dwivedi (m. 1979)
- Children: Dr. Charu Dwivedi, Rohit Dwivedi, Mohit Dwivedi
- Parent: Purushottam Dwivedi (father)
- Education: Bachelor of Arts; Bachelor of Laws
- Alma mater: Allahabad University
- Profession: Lawyer, Politician

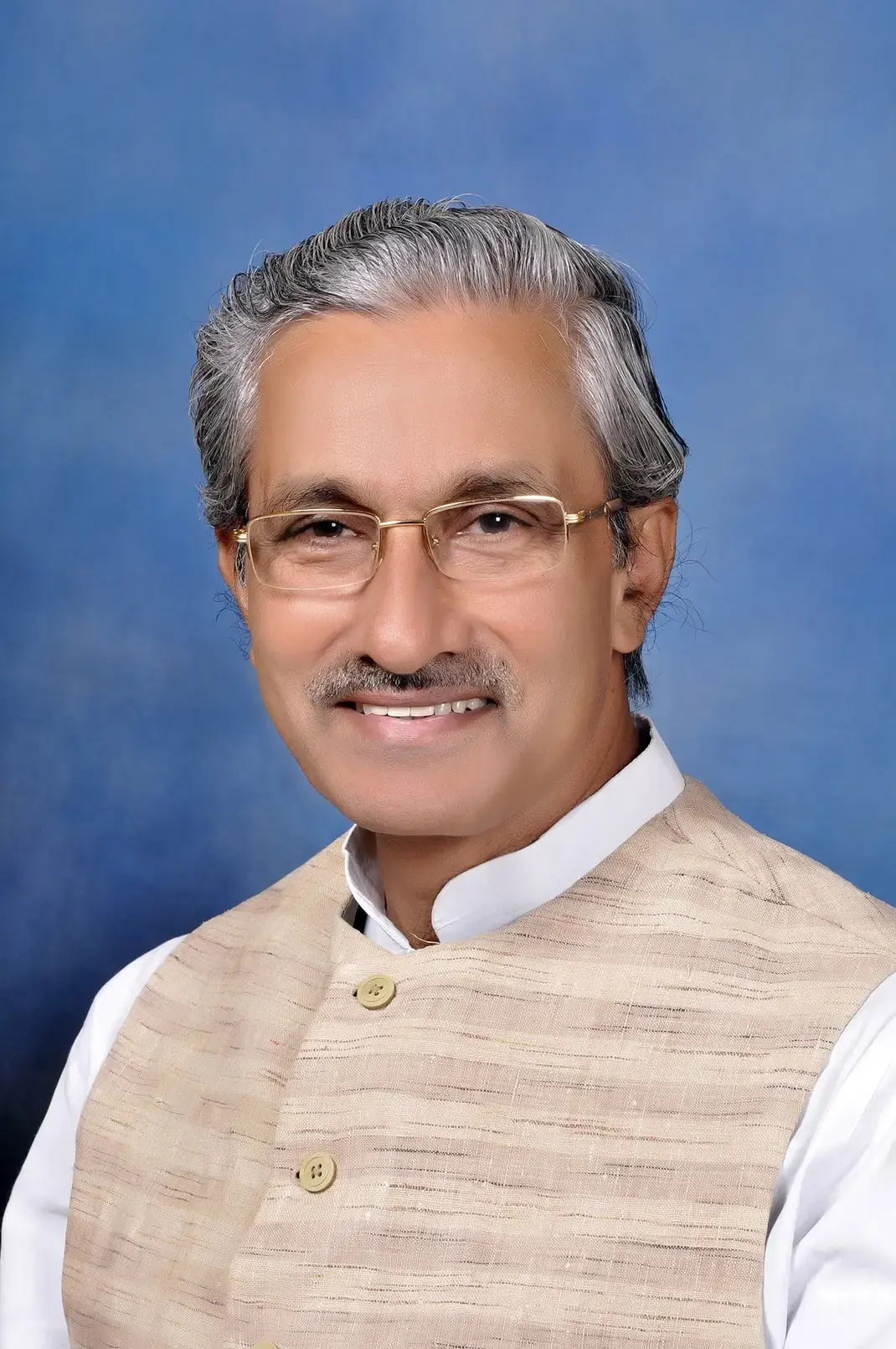
Ramesh Chandra Dwivedi

Ramesh Chandra Dwivedi is an Indian politician from Uttar Pradesh who had represented Banda in the Lok Sabha from 1998 to 1999 and Naraini in the Uttar Pradesh Legislative Assembly from 1991 to 1992.
