= Reena Choudhary =

Indian politician

Member of Parliament, Lok Sabha
- Constituency: Mohanlalganj

Personal details
- Born: 2 June 1968 (age 58)
- Party: Samajwadi Party
- Profession: Politician, social worker, artist, industrialist

Reena Choudhary (born. 2 June 1968) is a political and social worker and a member of parliament elected from the Mohanlalganj constituency in the Indian state of Uttar Pradesh and has been a Samajwadi Party leader.

== Early life ==
Reena was born on 2 June 1968 to Shri Bhagwati Prasad and Smt. Chandra Wati in Gorakhpur, Uttar Pradesh. She is married and has a son.

== Education ==
Reena finished her education from Banasthali Vidyapith(Rajasthan) and Lucknow University. Reena completed her Master of Arts and LL.B.

== Career ==
Reena is an artist. Reena was elected to 12th Lok Sabha in 1998. During 1998–99, she served as

- Member on the Committee of Defence and its Sub-Committee-II.
- Member, Committee on Provision of Computers to members of parliament
- Member, Consultative Committee, Ministry of Steel and Mines

In 1999, she was re-elected to the 13th Lok Sabha for a 2nd term. During 1999–2000, she served as

- Member, Committee on Transport and Tourism
- Member, Committee on Provision of Computers to members of parliament

During 2000–2004, she was also a Member on the Consultative Committee, Ministry of Civil Aviation.

In 2004, she was denied a party ticket and hence resigned from the primary membership of the party. She also alleged that Samajwadi Party compromised with the interests of the people of the area by forcing an outsider in the constituency. She claimed that two other senior party leaders Jawahar Jaiswal from Chandauli and Dharam Raj Patel from Phoolpur – both sitting members of the dissolved Lok Sabha, were also unhappy over denial of tickets.

In 2002, Reena suffered 15% burns due to an accident at her residence. The police officials believed that the fire was caused by a leak in the pipe connecting the LPG cylinder and the cooking range.
