= All India Indira Congress (Secular) =

Political party in India

All India Indira Congress (Secular) was a regional and nationalist political party in Rajasthan, India. All India Indira Congress (Secular) was formed when Sis Ram Ola split from the Indian National Congress. All India Indira Congress (Secular) merged with Congress in 2002.

== See also ==
- Indian National Congress breakaway parties
