= N. T. Shanmugam =

Indian politician

N. T. Shanmugam is an Indian politician and former Minister of State for Food Processing Industries. He was elected to the Lok Sabha from Vellore constituency as a Pattali Makkal Katchi candidate in 1998 and 1999 elections.
