= 1998 Indian general election in Karnataka =

Parliamentary election in India

Indian general election in Karnataka, 1998
- 16, 22 and 28 February 1998

28 (of 543) seats in the Lok Sabha
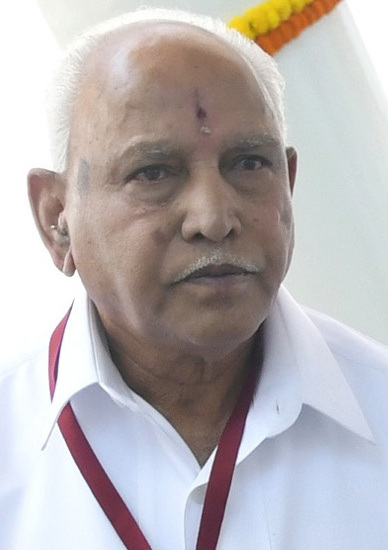

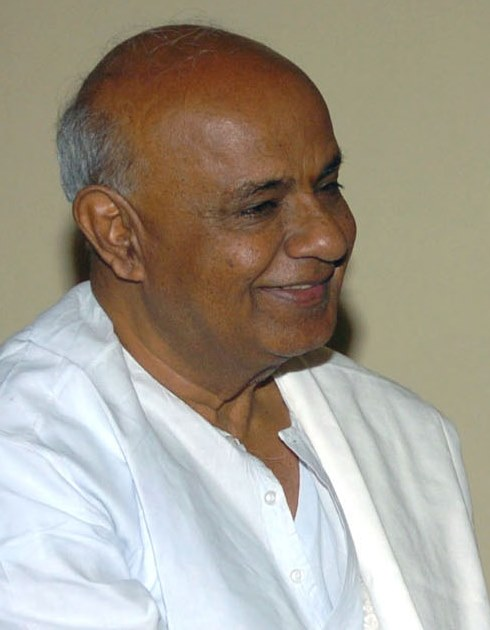
	First party	Second party
Leader	B. S. Yediyurappa
Party	BJP	INC
Alliance	NDA	-
Leader's seat	Did not Contest (Note: Yediyurappa was the sitting MLA for Shikaripura)
Seats won	13	9
Seat change	▲7	▲4
Popular vote	5,686,151	7,642,756
Percentage	26.95%	36.22%
Swing	▲2.10%	▲5.93%
	Third party	Fourth party
Leader	H. D. Deve Gowda	Ramakrishna Hegde
Party	JD	Lok Shakti
Alliance	UF	NDA
Leader's seat	Hassan (won)	Rajya Sabha
Seats won	3	3
Seat change	▼13	▲3
Popular vote	4,576,244	2,425,799
Percentage	21.69%	11.50%
Swing	▼13.22%	▲11.50%
Prime Minister before election
Inder Kumar Gujral
JD
Prime Minister after election
Atal Bihari Vajpayee
BJP

General elections were held in India on 16, 22 and 28 February 1998 to elect the members of the twelfth Lok Sabha. The elections were held three years ahead of schedule after the government led by Inder Kumar Gujral collapsed when the Indian National Congress (INC) withdrew its support in November 1997.

The result was another hung parliament, with no party or alliance able to muster a majority. However, Atal Bihari Vajpayee of the Bharatiya Janata Party was able to form a coalition government led by the National Democratic Alliance with the outside support of the Telugu Desam Party. He was sworn in as Prime Minister with support from 272 of 543 MPs. However, his government collapsed on 17 April 1999 when the All India Anna Dravida Munnetra Kazhagam withdrew its support, after Vajpayee refused to meet the demands of its leader J. Jayalalithaa, namely halting the corruption cases against her and the sacking of the Tamil Nadu government led by her bete-noire M. Karunanidhi. This led to fresh elections in 1999.

The elections were the second consecutive general elections in which the party that received the most votes did not win the most seats.

== Election schedule ==
Karnataka 1998 General Election Schedule by Constituency
Phase	Constituency	Polling date	Counting date	Declaration of result
Phase 1	Kanakapura	16 February 1998	02 March 1998	02 March 1998
Phase 1	Bangalore North	16 February 1998	02 March 1998	02 March 1998
Phase 1	Bangalore South	16 February 1998	02 March 1998	02 March 1998
Phase 1	Mandya	16 February 1998	02 March 1998	02 March 1998
Phase 1	Chamarajanagar	16 February 1998	02 March 1998	03 March 1998
Phase 1	Mysore	16 February 1998	02 March 1998	02 March 1998
Phase 1	Mangalore	16 February 1998	02 March 1998	02 March 1998
Phase 1	Udupi	16 February 1998	02 March 1998	02 March 1998
Phase 1	Hassan	16 February 1998	02 March 1998	02 March 1998
Phase 1	Chikmagalur	16 February 1998	02 March 1998	02 March 1998
Phase 1	Shimoga	16 February 1998	02 March 1998	02 March 1998
Phase 1	Kanara	16 February 1998	02 March 1998	02 March 1998
Phase 1	Dharwad South	16 February 1998	02 March 1998	02 March 1998
Phase 1	Dharwad North	16 February 1998	02 March 1998	02 March 1998
Phase 1	Belgaum	16 February 1998	02 March 1998	02 March 1998
Phase 1	Chikkodi	16 February 1998	02 March 1998	02 March 1998
Phase 1	Bagalkot	16 February 1998	02 March 1998	02 March 1998
Phase 1	Bijapur	16 February 1998	02 March 1998	03 March 1998
Phase 2	Bidar	22 February 1998	02 March 1998	02 March 1998
Phase 2	Gulbarga	22 February 1998	02 March 1998	02 March 1998
Phase 2	Raichur	22 February 1998	02 March 1998	02 March 1998
Phase 2	Koppal	22 February 1998	02 March 1998	02 March 1998
Phase 2	Bellary	22 February 1998	02 March 1998	03 March 1998
Phase 2	Davangere	22 February 1998	02 March 1998	02 March 1998
Phase 2	Chitradurga	22 February 1998	02 March 1998	03 March 1998
Phase 2	Tumkur	22 February 1998	02 March 1998	02 March 1998
Phase 2	Chikballapur	22 February 1998	02 March 1998	02 March 1998
Phase 2	Kolar	22 February 1998	02 March 1998	02 March 1998

== Voter Turnout ==
#	Constituency Name	Turnout
1	Bidar (SC)	51.33%
2	Gulbarga	59.00%
3	Raichur	50.62%
4	Koppal	59.92%
5	Bellary	62.61%
6	Davangere	70.06%
7	Chitradurga	66.20%
8	Tumkur	67.45%
9	Chikballapur	72.09%
10	Kolar (SC)	72.27%
11	Kanakapura	63.90%
12	Bangalore North	57.78%
13	Bangalore South	57.95%
14	Mandya	74.48%
15	Chamarajanagar (SC)	69.03%
16	Mysore	69.22%
17	Mangalore	73.66%
18	Udupi	67.38%
19	Hassan	73.74%
20	Chikmagalur	69.25%
21	Shimoga	70.87%
22	Kanara	67.27%
23	Dharwad South	67.65%
24	Dharwad North	63.99%
25	Belgaum	61.39%
26	Chikkodi (SC)	64.86%
27	Bagalkot	67.13%
28	Bijapur	57.82%

== List of Political Parties ==
=== National Democratic Alliance ===
National Democratic Alliance
Party	Flag	Symbol	Leader	Seats
Bharatiya Janata Party			Atal Bihari Vajpayee	18
Lok Shakti			Ramakrishna Hegde	10
Total				28

=== Indian National Congress ===
No.	Party	Flag	Symbol	Leader	Seats contested
1.	Indian National Congress			Sitaram Kesri	28

=== Janata Dal ===
Party	Flag	Symbol	Leader	Seats contested
Janata Dal			H. D. Deve Gowda	28

== List of Candidates ==
Constituency		NDA		INC		JD	
No.	Name	Party	Candidate	Party	Candidate	Party	Candidate
1	Bidar (SC)	BJP	Ramchandra Veerappa	INC	Gundappa Korwar	JD	Babu Honna Naik
2	Gulbarga	BJP	Basavaraj Patil Sedam	INC	Basawaraj Jawali	JD	Qamar ul Islam
3	Raichur	LS	Abdul Samad Siddiqui	INC	Venkatesh Nayak	JD	Raja Rangappa Naik
4	Koppal	LS	Agadi Virupakshappa Sanganna	INC	H. G. Ramulu	JD	Basavaraj Rayareddy
5	Bellary	LS	N. Thippanna	INC	K. C. Kondaiah	JD	Y. Nettakallappa
6	Davangere	BJP	G. M. Siddeshwara	INC	Shamanuru Shivashankarappa	JD	S.H. Patel
7	Chitradurga	LS	P. Kodandaramaiah	INC	C. P. Mudalagiriyappa	JD	Thippeswamy
8	Tumkur	BJP	S. Mallikarjunaiah	INC	R. Narayana	JD	C. N. Bhaskarappa
9	Chikballapur	LS	Jayanthi	INC	R. L. Jalappa	JD	C. Byre Gowda
10	Kolar (SC)	BJP	V. Hanumappa	INC	K. H. Muniyappa	JD	Balaji Channaiah
11	Kanakapura	BJP	M. Srinivas	INC	Dr. D. Premachandra Sagar	JD	H. D. Kumaraswamy
12	Bangalore North	LS	Jeevaraj Alva	INC	C. K. Jaffer Sharief	JD	C. Narayanaswamy
13	Bangalore South	BJP	Ananth Kumar	INC	D.P. Sharma	JD	V. Somanna
14	Mandya	BJP	H. Srinivas	INC	G. Made Gowda	JD	Ambareesh
15	Chamarajanagar (SC)	LS	Susheela Keshavamurthy	INC	Srinivasa Prasad	JD	A. Siddaraju
16	Mysore	BJP	C. H. Vijayashankar	INC	S. Chikkamadu	JD	G. T. Devegowda
17	Mangalore	BJP	V. Dhananjay Kumar	INC	Janardhana Poojary	JD	Mathanda Ramesh
18	Udupi	BJP	I. M. Jayarama Shetty	INC	Oscar Fernandes	JD	Mattar Rathnakar Hegde
19	Hassan	BJP	Susheela Shivappa	INC	H. C. Srikantaiah	JD	H. D. Deve Gowda
20	Chikmagalur	BJP	D. C. Srikantappa	INC	Veerappa Moily	JD	B. L. Shankar
21	Shimoga	BJP	Ayanur Manjunath	INC	D. B. Chandregowda	JD	B. P. Shivakumar
22	Kanara	BJP	Ananth Kumar	INC	Margaret Alva	JD	Bobati Udachappa Kheerappa
23	Dharwad South	LS	B.M. Menasinakai	INC	Prof. I.G. Sanadi	JD	Basavaraj Shivannanavar
24	Dharwad North	BJP	Vijay Sankeshwar	INC	D. K. Naikar	JD	Shankaranna Munvalli
25	Belgaum	BJP	Babagouda Rudragouda Patil	INC	Sidnal Shanmukhappa Basappa	JD	Shivanand H. Koujalagi
26	Chikkodi (SC)	LS	Ramesh Jigajinagi	INC	B. Shankaranand	JD	Chaugule Shakuntala Tukaram
27	Bagalkot	LS	Ajaykumar Sambasadashiv Sarnaik	INC	Siddu Nyamagouda	JD	H. Y. Meti
28	Bijapur	BJP	Patil Basanagouda Linganagouda	INC	M. B. Patil	JD	Patil Ravikant Shankareppa

== Results ==
=== Result by Party/Alliance ===
Alliance/ Party		Popular vote			Seats		
Alliance/ Party		Votes	%	±pp	Contested	Won	+/−
NDA	BJP	56,86,151	26.95	▲2.10	18	13	▲7
NDA	LS	24,25,799	11.50	New entry	10	3	New entry
NDA	Total	81,11,950	38.45	Steady	28	16	Steady
INC		76,42,756	36.22	▲5.93	28	9	▲4
JD		45,76,244	21.69	▼13.22	28	3	▼13
KVP		3,71,346	1.76		19	0	
Others		2,40,806	1.13	Steady	33	0	Steady
IND		1,59,568	0.76		64	0	Steady
Total		2,11,02,670	100%	-	200	28	-

=== Detailed Results ===
Constituency		Winner				Runner Up				Margin	%
#	Name	Candidate	Party	Votes	%	Candidate	Party	Votes	%	Margin	%
1	Bidar (SC)	Ramchandra Veerappa	BJP	3,17,504	53.25	Babu Honna Naik	JD	1,32,871	22.28	1,84,633	30.97
2	Gulbarga	Basavaraj Patil Sedam	BJP	3,28,982	44.72	Qamarul Islam	JD	1,97,184	26.80	1,31,798	17.92
3	Raichur	A. Venkatesh Naik	INC	2,64,187	44.89	Raja Rangappa Naik	JD	1,85,909	31.59	78,278	13.30
4	Koppal	H. G. Ramulu	INC	2,89,681	40.94	Basavaraj Rayareddy	JD	2,06,559	29.19	83,122	11.75
5	Bellary	K. C. Kondaiah	INC	2,84,909	39.76	N. Thippanna	LS	2,21,171	30.86	63,738	8.90
6	Davangere	Shamanuru Sh.	INC	3,43,704	42.21	G. Mallikarjunappa	BJP	3,32,372	40.82	11,332	1.39
7	Chitradurga	C. P. Mudalagiriyappa	INC	3,21,930	42.88	P. Kodandaramaiah	LS	2,63,609	35.11	58,321	7.77
8	Tumkur	S. Mallikarjunaiah	BJP	3,27,312	45.50	R. Narayana	INC	2,56,125	35.60	71,187	9.90
9	Chikballapur	R. L. Jalappa	INC	3,60,761	44.41	C. Byre Gowda	JD	2,33,706	28.77	1,27,055	15.64
10	Kolar (SC)	K. H. Muniyappa	INC	3,04,261	39.62	Balaji Channaiah	JD	2,26,289	29.47	77,972	10.15
11	Kanakapura	M. Srinivas	BJP	4,70,387	39.00	D. Premachandra Sagar	INC	4,53,946	37.64	16,441	1.36
12	Bangalore North	C. K. Jaffer Sharief	INC	3,99,582	42.11	Jeevaraj Alva	LS	3,27,135	34.48	72,447	7.63
13	Bangalore South	Ananth Kumar	BJP	4,29,648	53.83	D.P. Sharma	INC	2,49,601	31.27	1,80,047	22.56
14	Mandya	Ambareesh	JD	4,31,439	54.97	G. Made Gowda	INC	2,50,916	31.97	1,80,523	23.00
15	Chamarajanagar (SC)	A. Siddaraju	JD	3,40,490	46.49	Srinivasa Prasad	INC	2,70,175	36.89	70,315	9.60
16	Mysore	C. H. Vijayashankar	BJP	3,55,846	42.10	S. Chikkamadu	INC	2,52,822	29.91	1,03,024	12.19
17	Mangalore	V. Dhananjay Kumar	BJP	3,41,362	48.15	Janardhana Poojary	INC	3,34,455	47.18	6,907	0.97
18	Udupi	I. M. Jayarama Shetty	BJP	3,41,466	50.83	Oscar Fernandes	INC	2,84,898	42.41	56,568	8.42
19	Hassan	H.D. Devegowda	JD	3,36,407	39.41	H. C. Srikantaiah	INC	3,04,753	35.70	31,654	3.71
20	Chikmagalur	D. C. Srikantappa	BJP	3,16,137	44.00	Veerappa Moily	INC	2,63,641	36.69	52,496	7.31
21	Shimoga	Ayanur Manjunath	BJP	3,52,277	45.40	D. B. Chandregowda	INC	1,92,370	24.79	1,59,907	20.61
22	Kanara	Ananth Kumar	BJP	3,63,051	50.74	Margaret Alva	INC	2,76,004	38.57	87,047	12.17
23	Dharwad South	B.M. Menasinakai	LS	3,28,333	46.61	Prof. I.G. Sanadi	INC	2,41,371	34.27	86,962	12.34
24	Dharwad North	Vijay Sankeshwar	BJP	3,39,660	50.15	D. K. Naikar	INC	2,10,459	31.07	1,29,201	19.08
25	Belgaum	Babagouda Patil	BJP	3,27,891	45.28	Sidnal S. Basappa	INC	2,30,834	31.87	97,057	13.41
26	Chikkodi (SC)	Ramesh Jigajinagi	LS	3,59,760	52.99	B. Shankaranand	INC	2,28,522	33.66	1,31,238	19.33
27	Bagalkot	Ajaykumar Sarnaik	LS	3,52,795	49.73	Siddu Nyamagouda	INC	2,69,163	37.94	83,632	11.79
28	Bijapur	M. B. Patil	INC	2,61,623	40.92	Basanagouda L. Patil	BJP	2,08,801	32.65	52,822	8.27

== Post-election Union Council of Ministers from Karnataka ==
#	Name	Constituency	Designation	Department	From	To	Party
1	Ramakrishna Hegde	Rajya Sabha (Karnataka)	Cabinet Minister	Commerce	19 March 1998	13 Oct 1999	LS
2	Ananth Kumar	Bangalore South	Cabinet Minister	Civil Aviation	19 March 1998	13 Oct 1999	BJP
2	Ananth Kumar	Bangalore South	Cabinet Minister	Tourism	30 Jan 1999	13 Oct 1999	BJP
