= List of National Democratic Alliance candidates in the 1998 Indian general election =

NDA candidates in 1998 Indian lower house election

National Democratic Alliance is an Indian political party coalition led by Bharatiya Janata Party. For the 1998 Indian general election, the NDA's candidates for the Lok Sabha constituencies are as follows.

== Lok Sabha 1998 general election ==
Constituents of National Democratic Alliance (pre-poll alliance)
No.	Party	Alliance in states	Seats contested	Seats won	
1	Bharatiya Janata Party	All States and UTs	388	182	▲21
2	West Bengal Trinamool Congress	West Bengal	28	7	▲7
3	All India Anna Dravida Munnetra Kazhagam	Tamil Nadu; Pondicherry	23	18	▲18
4	Samata Party	Bihar; Uttar Pradesh	23	12	▲4
5	Shiv Sena	Maharashtra	22	6	▼9
6	Biju Janata Dal	Orissa	12	9	▲9
7	Lok Shakti	Karnataka; Nagaland	11	3	▲3
8	Shiromani Akali Dal	Punjab	8	8	Steady
9	Pattali Makkal Katchi	Tamil Nadu	5	4	▲4
10	Marumalarchi Dravida Munnetra Kazhagam	Tamil Nadu	5	3	▲3
11	Haryana Vikas Party	Haryana	4	1	▼2
12	NTR Telugu Desam Party (LP)	Andhra Pradesh	3	0	Steady
13	Manipur State Congress Party	Manipur	1	1	▲1
14	Janata Party	Tamil Nadu	1	1	▲1
15	Sikkim Democratic Front	Sikkim	1	1	▲1
16	Satnam Singh Kainth (independent candidate supported by BJP)	Punjab	1	1	▲1
17	Vazhappady K. Ramamurthy (independent candidate supported by BJP)	Tamil Nadu	1	1	▲1
18	Maneka Gandhi (independent candidate supported by BJP)	Uttar Pradesh	1	1	▲1
19	Suresh Kalmadi (independent candidate supported by BJP)	Maharashtra	1	0	▼1
Total NDA candidates			539	259	▲75

== Andhra Pradesh ==
BJP (38) NTRTDP(LP) (3)

Constituency No.	Constituency	Reserved for (SC/ST/None)	Candidate	Party	Poll On	Result
1	Srikakulam	None	Appayyadora Hanumantu	NTR Telugu Desam Party (LP)		Lost
2	Parvathipuram	ST	None			
3	Bobbili	None	Vasireddy Varada Ramarao	Bharatiya Janata Party		Lost
4	Visakhapatnam	None	D.V.Subba Rao	Bharatiya Janata Party		Lost
5	Bhadrachalam	ST	Setti Lakshmanudu	NTR Telugu Desam Party (LP)		Lost
6	Anakapalli	None	P.V. Chalapathi Rao	Bharatiya Janata Party		Lost
7	Kakinada	None	U. V. Krishnam Raju	Bharatiya Janata Party		Won
8	Rajahmundry	None	Girajala Venkata Swamy Naidu	Bharatiya Janata Party		Won
9	Amalapuram	SC	Kommabathula Umamaheswara Rao	Bharatiya Janata Party		Lost
10	Narasapur	None	Parakala Prabhakar	Bharatiya Janata Party		Lost
11	Eluru	None	Yalamarthi Jayalakshmi	Bharatiya Janata Party		Lost
12	Machilipatnam	None	Vemuri Nagarjuna	Bharatiya Janata Party		Lost
13	Vijayawada	None	Vadde Ramakrishna Prasad	Bharatiya Janata Party		Lost
14	Tenali	None	Yadlapati Raghunath Babu	Bharatiya Janata Party		Lost
15	Guntur	None	Avula Veerasekhara Rao	Bharatiya Janata Party		Lost
16	Bapatla	None	Ganesuni Rathaiah Chowdary	Bharatiya Janata Party		Lost
17	Narasaraopet	None	Kabbireddy Medikonda	Bharatiya Janata Party		Lost
18	Ongole	None	Kondapalli Guravaiah Naidu	Bharatiya Janata Party		Lost
19	Nellore	SC	Karupothala Balakondaiah	Bharatiya Janata Party		Lost
20	Tirupathi	SC	Nandipaku Venkataswamy	Bharatiya Janata Party		Lost
21	Chittoor	None	N.P. Venkateswara Chowdary	Bharatiya Janata Party		Lost
22	Rajampet	None	A. Harinath Reddy	Bharatiya Janata Party		Lost
23	Cuddapah	None	Kadiri Nagendra Prasad	Bharatiya Janata Party		Lost
24	Hindupur	None	P Anjani Devi	Bharatiya Janata Party		Lost
25	Anantapur	None	Veluri Kesava Chowdari	Bharatiya Janata Party		Lost
26	Kurnool	None	K. Venkataswamy	Bharatiya Janata Party		Lost
27	Nandyal	None	Syed Jaffar Ali Khan	Bharatiya Janata Party		Lost
28	Nagarkurnool	SC	S. Balu	Bharatiya Janata Party		Lost
29	Mahabubnagar	None	A. P. Jithender Reddy	Bharatiya Janata Party		Lost
30	Hyderabad	None	Baddam Bal Reddy	Bharatiya Janata Party		Lost
31	Secunderabad	None	Bandaru Dattatreya	Bharatiya Janata Party		Won
32	Siddipet	SC	N.A Krishna	Bharatiya Janata Party		Lost
33	Medak	None	Ale Narendra	Bharatiya Janata Party		Lost
34	Nizamabad	None	Gaddam Atmacharan Reddy	Bharatiya Janata Party		Lost
35	Adilabad	None	Vishnu Prakash Bajaj	Bharatiya Janata Party		Lost
36	Peddapalli	SC	Kasipeta Lingaiah	Bharatiya Janata Party		Lost
37	Karimnagar	None	C. Vidyasagar Rao	Bharatiya Janata Party		Won
38	Hanamkonda	None	S. Madhusudhana Chary	NTR Telugu Desam Party (LP)		Lost
39	Warangal	None	Chandupatla Janga Reddy	Bharatiya Janata Party		Lost
40	Khammam	None	Dharavath Ravinder Naik	Bharatiya Janata Party		Lost
41	Nalgonda	None	Nallu Indrasena Reddy	Bharatiya Janata Party		Lost
42	Miryalguda	None	Juttukonda Satyanarayana	Bharatiya Janata Party		Lost

== Arunachal Pradesh ==
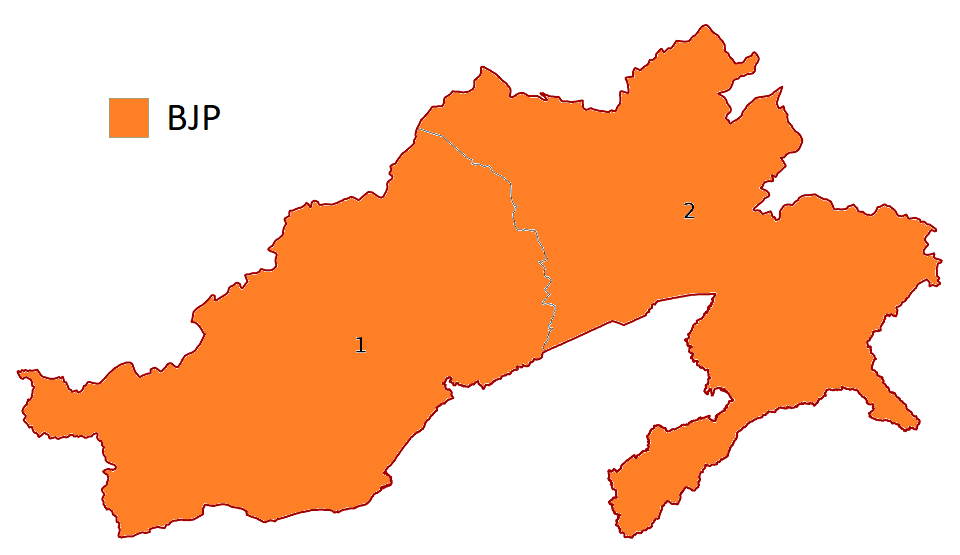

BJP (2)

Constituency No.	Constituency	Reserved for (SC/ST/None)	Candidate	Party	Poll On	Result
1	Arunachal West	None	Tomo Riba	Bharatiya Janata Party		Lost
2	Arunachal East	None	Sotai Kri	Bharatiya Janata Party		Lost

== Assam ==
BJP (14)

Constituency No.	Constituency	Reserved for (SC/ST/None)	Candidate	Party	Poll On	Result
1	Karimganj	SC	Swapan Kumar Das	Bharatiya Janata Party		Lost
2	Silchar	None	Kabindra Purkayastha	Bharatiya Janata Party		Won
3	Autonomous District	ST	Pabitra Kemprai	Bharatiya Janata Party		Lost
4	Dhubri	None	Pannalal Oswal	Bharatiya Janata Party		Lost
5	Kokrajhar	ST	Charan Narzary	Bharatiya Janata Party		Lost
6	Barpeta	None	Manjushree Pathak	Bharatiya Janata Party		Lost
7	Gauhati	None	Manoranjan Goswami	Bharatiya Janata Party		Lost
8	Mangaldoi	None	Munindra Singha Lahkar	Bharatiya Janata Party		Lost
9	Tezpur	None	Iswar Prasanna Hazarika	Bharatiya Janata Party		Lost
10	Nowgong	None	Rajen Gohain	Bharatiya Janata Party		Lost
11	Kaliabor	None	Mrinal Saikia	Bharatiya Janata Party		Lost
12	Jorhat	None	Krishna Kumar Handique	Bharatiya Janata Party		Lost
13	Dibrugarh	None	Ajit Chaliha	Bharatiya Janata Party		Lost
14	Lakhimpur	None	Uday Shankar Hazarika	Bharatiya Janata Party		Lost

== Bihar ==
BJP (32) SAP (21)

Constituency No.	Constituency	Reserved for (SC/ST/None)	Candidate	Party	Poll On	Result
1	Bagaha	SC	Mahendra Baitha	Samata Party		Won
2	Bettiah	None	Madan Prasad Jaiswal	Bharatiya Janata Party		Won
3	Motihari	None	Radha Mohan Singh	Bharatiya Janata Party		Lost
4	Gopalganj	None	Abdul Ghafoor	Samata Party		Won
5	Siwan	None	Vijay Shanker Dubey	Bharatiya Janata Party		Lost
6	Maharajganj	None	Prabhunath Singh	Samata Party		Won
7	Chapra	None	Rajiv Pratap Rudy	Bharatiya Janata Party		Lost
8	Hajipur	SC	None			
9	Vaishali	None	Brishin Patel	Samata Party		Lost
10	Muzaffarpur	None	Harendra Kumar	Samata Party		Lost
11	Sitamarhi	None	Awanish Kumar Singh	Bharatiya Janata Party		Lost
12	Sheohar	None	Hari Kishore Singh	Samata Party		Lost
13	Madhubani	None	Hukmdev Narayan Yadav	Bharatiya Janata Party		Lost
14	Jhanjharpur	None	Jagdish N. Choudhary	Samata Party		Lost
15	Darbhanga	None	Tarakant Jha	Bharatiya Janata Party		Lost
16	Rosera	SC	Ram Sewak Hazari	Samata Party		Lost
17	Samastipur	None	Ashok Singh	Samata Party		Lost
18	Barh	None	Nitish Kumar	Samata Party		Won
19	Balia	None	Ram Naresh Prasad Singh	Bharatiya Janata Party		Lost
20	Saharsa	None	Choudhary Md.Farooque Salahuddiin	Samata Party		Lost
21	Madhepura	None	Nirmal Kumar Singh	Samata Party		Lost
22	Araria	SC	Ramjidas Rishidev	Bharatiya Janata Party		Won
23	Kishanganj	None	Syed Shahnawaz Hussain	Bharatiya Janata Party		Lost
24	Purnea	None	Jai Krishna Mandal	Bharatiya Janata Party		Won
25	Katihar	None	Nikhil Kumar Choudhary	Bharatiya Janata Party		Lost
26	Rajmahal	ST	Som Marandi	Bharatiya Janata Party		Won
27	Dumka	ST	Babulal Marandi	Bharatiya Janata Party		Won
28	Godda	None	Jagadambi Prasad Yadav	Bharatiya Janata Party		Won
29	Banka	None	Digvijay Singh	Samata Party		Won
30	Bhagalpur	None	Prabhas Chandra Tiwari	Bharatiya Janata Party		Won
31	Khagaria	None	Shakuni Choudhury	Samata Party		Won
32	Monghyr	None	Brahmanand Mandal	Samata Party		Lost
33	Begusarai	None	Krishna Sahi	Samata Party		Lost
34	Nalanda	None	George Fernandes	Samata Party		Won
35	Patna	None	C. P. Thakur	Bharatiya Janata Party		Won
36	Arrah	None	H. P. Singh	Samata Party		Won
37	Buxar	None	Lalmuni Chaubey	Bharatiya Janata Party		Won
38	Sasaram	SC	Muni Lall	Bharatiya Janata Party		Won
39	Bikramganj	None	Vashistha Narain Singh	Samata Party		Won
40	Aurangabad	None	Sushil Kumar Singh	Samata Party		Won
41	Jahanabad	None	Arun Kumar	Samata Party		Lost
42	Nawada	SC	Kameshwar Paswan	Bharatiya Janata Party		Lost
43	Gaya	SC	Krishna Kumar Choudhary	Bharatiya Janata Party		Won
44	Chatra	None	Dhirendra Agarwal	Bharatiya Janata Party		Won
45	Kodarma	None	Rati Lal Prasad Verma	Bharatiya Janata Party		Won
46	Giridih	None	Ravindra Kumar Pandey	Bharatiya Janata Party		Won
47	Dhanbad	None	Rita Verma	Bharatiya Janata Party		Won
48	Hazaribagh	None	Yashwant Sinha	Bharatiya Janata Party		Won
49	Ranchi	None	Ram Tahal Choudhary	Bharatiya Janata Party		Won
50	Jamshedpur	None	Abha Mahato	Bharatiya Janata Party		Won
51	Singhbhum	ST	Chitrasen Sinku	Bharatiya Janata Party		Lost
52	Khunti	ST	Kariya Munda	Bharatiya Janata Party		Won
53	Lohardaga	ST	Lalit Oraon	Bharatiya Janata Party		Lost
54	Palamu	SC	Braj Mohan Ram	Bharatiya Janata Party		Won

== Goa ==
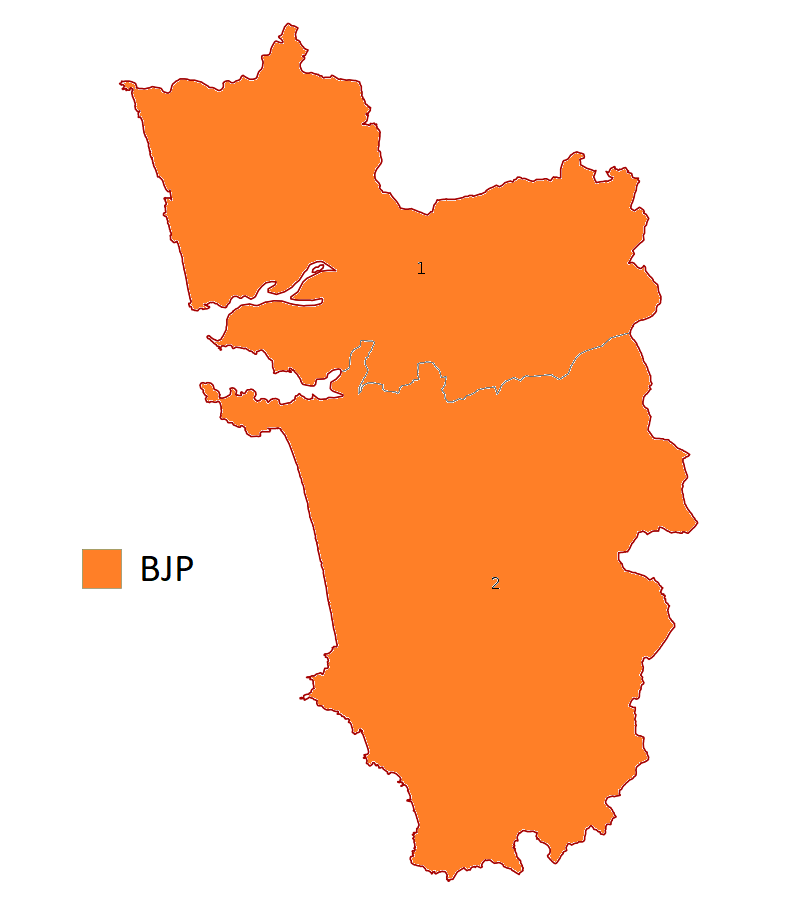

BJP (2)

Constituency No.	Constituency	Reserved for (SC/ST/None)	Candidate	Party	Poll On	Result
1	Panaji	None	Pandurang Raut	Bharatiya Janata Party		Lost
2	Mormugao	None	Ramakant Angle	Bharatiya Janata Party		Lost

== Gujarat ==
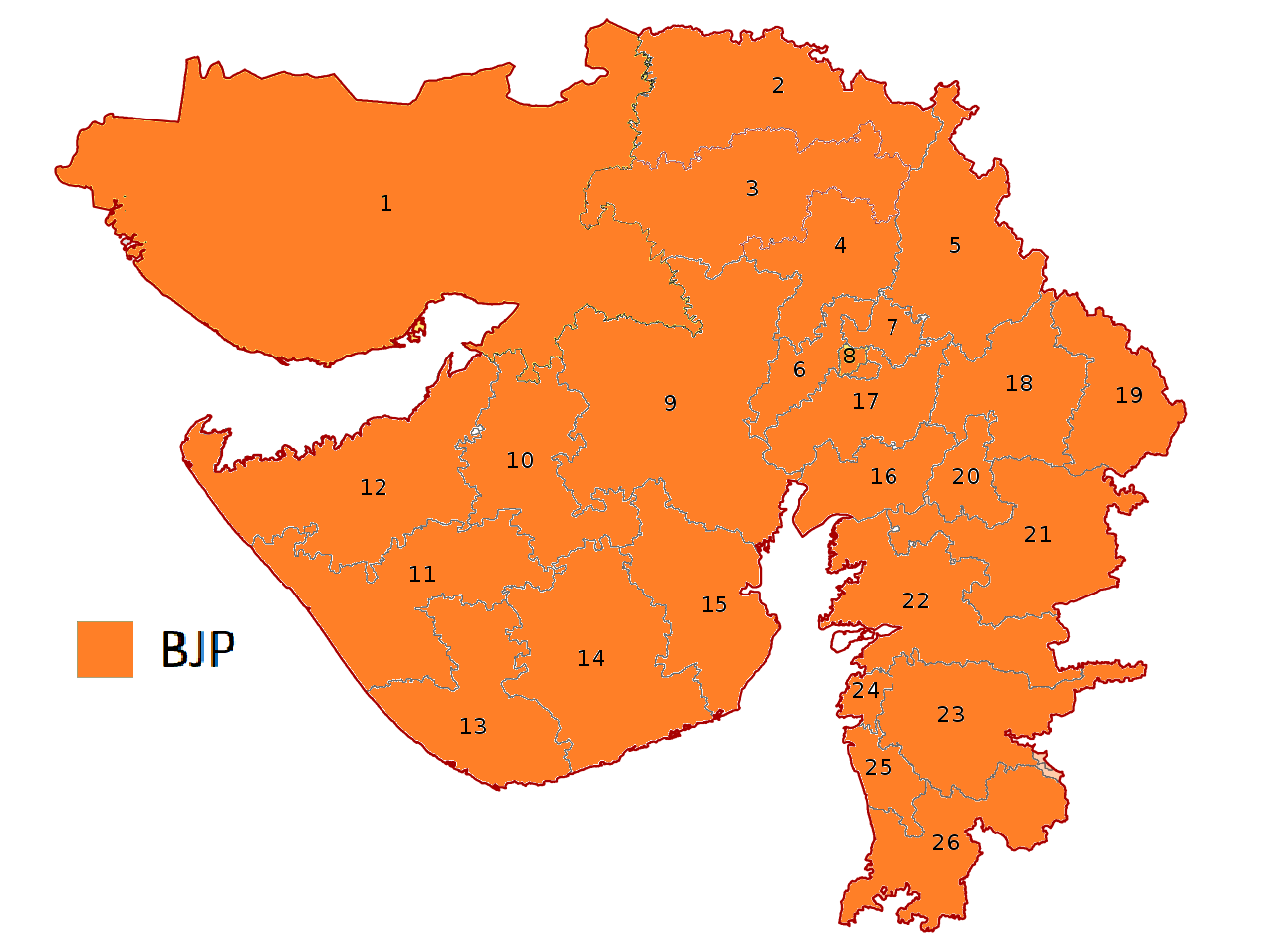

BJP (26)

Constituency No.	Constituency	Reserved for (SC/ST/None)	Candidate	Party	Poll On	Result
1	Kutch	None	Pushpdan Gadhavi	Bharatiya Janata Party		Won
2	Surendranagar	None	Bhavna Kardam Dave	Bharatiya Janata Party		Won
3	Jamnagar	None	Chandresh Patel Kordia	Bharatiya Janata Party		Won
4	Rajkot	None	Vallabhbhai Kathiria	Bharatiya Janata Party		Won
5	Porbandar	None	Gordhanbhai Javia	Bharatiya Janata Party		Won
6	Junagadh	None	Bhavna Chikhalia	Bharatiya Janata Party		Won
7	Amreli	None	Dileep Sanghani	Bharatiya Janata Party		Won
8	Bhavnagar	None	Rajendrasinh Rana	Bharatiya Janata Party		Won
9	Dhandhuka	SC	Ratilal Varma	Bharatiya Janata Party		Won
10	Ahmedabad	None	Harin Pathak	Bharatiya Janata Party		Won
11	Gandhinagar	None	L. K. Advani	Bharatiya Janata Party		Won
12	Mehsana	None	A. K. Patel	Bharatiya Janata Party		Won
13	Patan	SC	Mahesh Kanodia	Bharatiya Janata Party		Won
14	Banaskantha	None	Haribhai Parthibhai Chaudhary	Bharatiya Janata Party		Won
15	Sabarkantha	None	Kanubhai Patel	Bharatiya Janata Party		Lost
16	Kapadvanj	None	Jaysinhji Chauhan	Bharatiya Janata Party		Won
17	Dohad	ST	Tersinh Damor	Bharatiya Janata Party		Lost
18	Godhra	None	Gopalsinhjee Solanki	Bharatiya Janata Party		Lost
19	Kaira	None	Prabhatsinh Chauhan	Bharatiya Janata Party		Lost
20	Anand	None	Jayprakash Patel	Bharatiya Janata Party		Lost
21	Chhota Udaipur	ST	Ramsinh Rathwa	Bharatiya Janata Party		Lost
22	Baroda	None	Jayaben Thakkar	Bharatiya Janata Party		Won
23	Broach	None	Chandubhai Deshmukh	Bharatiya Janata Party		Won
24	Surat	None	Kashiram Rana	Bharatiya Janata Party		Won
25	Mandvi	ST	Mansinh Patel	Bharatiya Janata Party		Lost
26	Bulsar	ST	Manibhai Chaudhary	Bharatiya Janata Party		Won

== Haryana ==
BJP (6) HVP (4)

Constituency No.	Constituency	Reserved for (SC/ST/None)	Candidate	Party	Poll On	Result
1	Ambala	SC	Suraj Bhan	Bharatiya Janata Party		Lost
2	Kurukshetra	None	Jatinder Singh Kaka	Haryana Vikas Party		Lost
3	Karnal	None	Ishwar Dayal Swami	Bharatiya Janata Party		Lost
4	Sonepat	None	Abhey Ram Dahiya	Haryana Vikas Party		Lost
5	Rohtak	None	Swami Indervesh	Bharatiya Janata Party		Lost
6	Faridabad	None	Ram Chander Bainda	Bharatiya Janata Party		Won
7	Mahendragarh	None	Rao Ram Singh	Bharatiya Janata Party		Lost
8	Bhiwani	None	Surender Singh	Haryana Vikas Party		Won
9	Hisar	None	Om Prakash Jindal	Haryana Vikas Party		Lost
10	Sirsa	SC	Hans Raj	Bharatiya Janata Party		Lost

== Himachal Pradesh ==
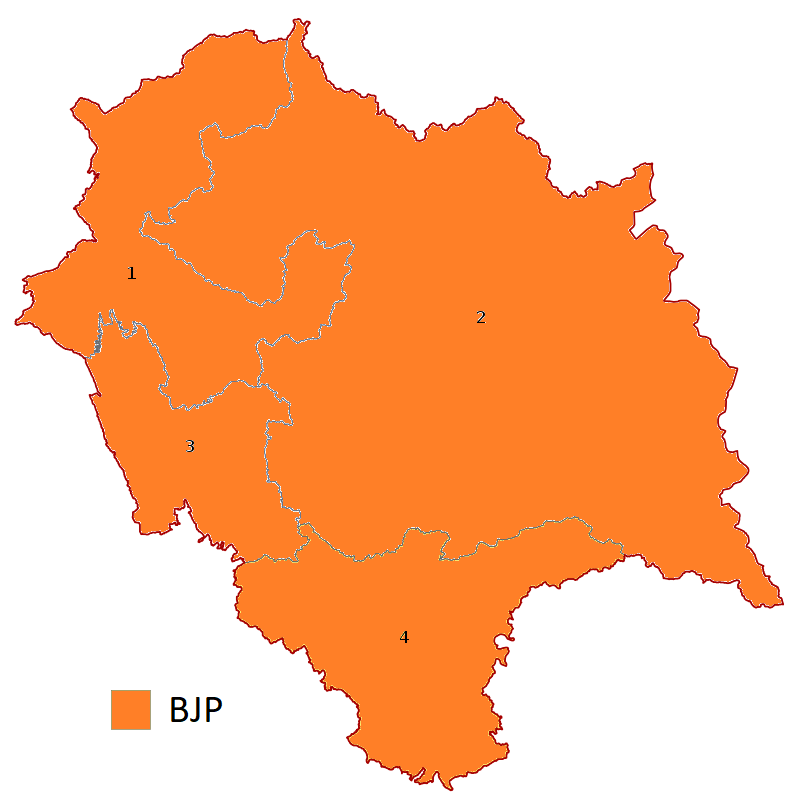

BJP (4)

Constituency No.	Constituency	Reserved for (SC/ST/None)	Candidate	Party	Poll On	Result
1	Simla	SC	Virender Kashyap	Bharatiya Janata Party		Lost
2	Mandi	None	Maheshwar Singh	Bharatiya Janata Party		Won
3	Kangra	None	Shanta Kumar	Bharatiya Janata Party		Won
4	Hamirpur	None	Suresh Chandel	Bharatiya Janata Party		Won

== Jammu and Kashmir ==
BJP (6)

Constituency No.	Constituency	Reserved for (SC/ST/None)	Candidate	Party	Poll On	Result
1	Baramulla	None	Din Mohmad Chichi	Bharatiya Janata Party		Lost
2	Srinagar	None	Abdul Rashid Kabuli	Bharatiya Janata Party		Lost
3	Anantnag	None	Showkat Hussain Yani	Bharatiya Janata Party		Lost
4	Ladakh	None	Spalzes Angmo	Bharatiya Janata Party		Lost
5	Udhampur	None	Chaman Lal Gupta	Bharatiya Janata Party		Won
6	Jammu	None	Vishno Datt Sharma	Bharatiya Janata Party		Won

== Karnataka ==
BJP (18) LS (10)

Constituency No.	Constituency	Reserved for (SC/ST/None)	Candidate	Party	Poll On	Result
1	Bidar	SC	Ramchandra Veerappa	Bharatiya Janata Party		Won
2	Gulbarga	None	Basavaraj Patil Sedam	Bharatiya Janata Party		Won
3	Raichur	None	Abdul Samad Siddiqui	Lok Shakti		Lost
4	Koppal	None	Virupaxappa Agadi	Lok Shakti		Lost
5	Bellary	None	N. Thippanna	Lok Shakti		Lost
6	Davanagere	None	G. Mallikarjunappa	Bharatiya Janata Party		Lost
7	Chitradurga	None	P. Kondandaramaiah	Lok Shakti		Lost
8	Tumkur	None	S. Mallikarjunaiah	Bharatiya Janata Party		Won
9	Chikballapur	None	Jayanthi	Lok Shakti		Lost
10	Kolar	SC	V.Hanumappa	Bharatiya Janata Party		Lost
11	Kanakapura	None	M. Srinivas	Bharatiya Janata Party		Won
12	Bangalore North	None	Jeevaraj Alva	Lok Shakti		Lost
13	Bangalore South	None	Ananth Kumar	Bharatiya Janata Party		Won
14	Mandya	None	H. Srinivas	Bharatiya Janata Party		Lost
15	Chamarajanagar	SC	Susheela Keshavamurthy	Lok Shakti		Lost
16	Mysore	None	C. H. Vijayashankar	Bharatiya Janata Party		Won
17	Mangalore	None	V. Dhananjay Kumar	Bharatiya Janata Party		Won
18	Udupi	None	I. M. Jayarama Shetty	Bharatiya Janata Party		Won
19	Hassan	None	Susheela Shivappa	Bharatiya Janata Party		Lost
20	Chikmagalur	None	D. C. Srikantappa	Bharatiya Janata Party		Won
21	Shimoga	None	Ayanur Manjunath	Bharatiya Janata Party		Won
22	Kanara	None	Anant Kumar Hegde	Bharatiya Janata Party		Won
23	Dharwad South	None	B.M. Mensinkai	Lok Shakti		Won
24	Dharwad North	None	Vijay Sankeshwar	Bharatiya Janata Party		Won
25	Belgaum	None	Babagouda Patil	Bharatiya Janata Party		Won
26	Chikkodi	SC	Ramesh Jigajinagi	Lok Shakti		Won
27	Bagalkot	None	Ajaykumar Sarnaik	Lok Shakti		Won
28	Bijapur	None	Basanagouda L Patil	Bharatiya Janata Party		Lost

== Kerala ==
BJP (20)

Constituency No.	Constituency	Reserved for (SC/ST/None)	Candidate	Party	Poll On	Result
1	Kasaragod	None	P. K. Krishna Das	Bharatiya Janata Party		Lost
2	Cannanore	None	PC Mohanan Master	Bharatiya Janata Party		Lost
3	Badagara	None	Chettoor Balakrishnan Master	Bharatiya Janata Party		Lost
4	Calicut	None	P. S. Sreedharan Pillai	Bharatiya Janata Party		Lost
5	Manjeri	None	Sumathy Haridas	Bharatiya Janata Party		Lost
6	Ponnani	None	Ahalliya Sankar	Bharatiya Janata Party		Lost
7	Palghat	None	T.C. Govindan	Bharatiya Janata Party		Lost
8	Ottapalam	SC	P. M. Velayudhan	Bharatiya Janata Party		Lost
9	Trichur	None	P.M. Gopinadhan	Bharatiya Janata Party		Lost
10	Mukundapuram	None	P D Purushothaman Master	Bharatiya Janata Party		Lost
11	Ernakulam	None	V.V. Augustine	Bharatiya Janata Party		Lost
12	Muvattupuzha	None	ADV. Narayanan Namboothiri	Bharatiya Janata Party		Lost
13	Kottayam	None	ADV. George Kurian	Bharatiya Janata Party		Lost
14	Idukki	None	ADV. D Asoka Kumar	Bharatiya Janata Party		Lost
15	Alleppey	None	T.L. Radhamma	Bharatiya Janata Party		Lost
16	Mavelikara	None	Rajan Moolaveettil	Bharatiya Janata Party		Lost
17	Adoor	SC	Kainakary Janardhanan	Bharatiya Janata Party		Lost
18	Quilon	None	DR. Raichel Matthai	Bharatiya Janata Party		Lost
19	Chirayinkil	None	T.M. Viswambharan	Bharatiya Janata Party		Lost
20	Trivandrum	None	Kerala Varma Raja	Bharatiya Janata Party		Lost

== Madhya Pradesh ==
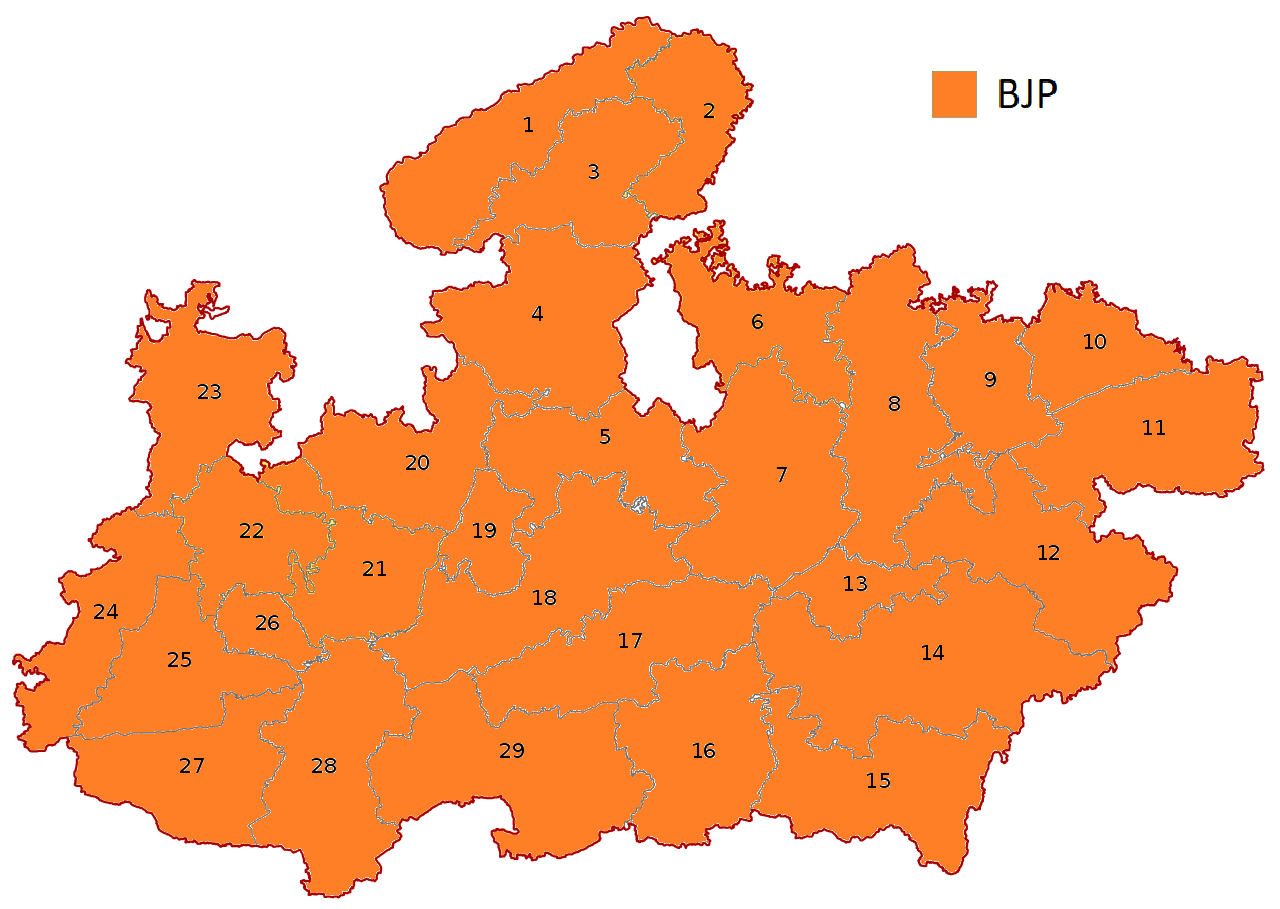

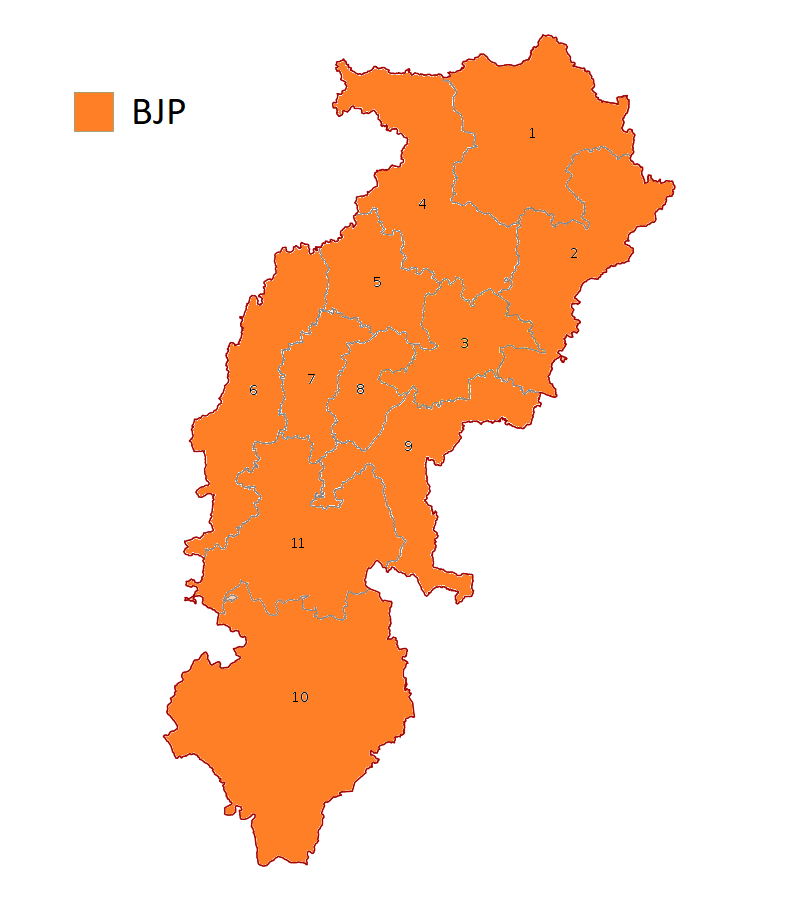
Chhattisgarh NDA

BJP (40)

Constituency No.	Constituency	Reserved for (SC/ST/None)	Candidate	Party	Poll On	Result
1	Morena	SC	Ashok Argal	Bharatiya Janata Party		Won
2	Bhind	None	Ram Lakhan Singh	Bharatiya Janata Party		Won
3	Gwalior	None	Jaibhan Singh Pawaiya	Bharatiya Janata Party		Lost
4	Guna	None	Vijaya Raje Scindia	Bharatiya Janata Party		Won
5	Sagar	SC	Virendra Kumar Khatik	Bharatiya Janata Party		Won
6	Khajuraho	None	Uma Bharti	Bharatiya Janata Party		Won
7	Damoh	None	Ramkrishna Kusmaria	Bharatiya Janata Party		Won
8	Satna	None	Ramanand Singh	Bharatiya Janata Party		Won
9	Rewa	None	Chandramani Tripathi	Bharatiya Janata Party		Won
10	Sidhi	ST	Jagannath Singh	Bharatiya Janata Party		Won
11	Shahdol	ST	Gyan Singh	Bharatiya Janata Party		Won
12	Surguja	ST	Larang Sai	Bharatiya Janata Party		Won
13	Raigarh	ST	Nand Kumar Sai	Bharatiya Janata Party		Lost
14	Janjgir	None	Manharan Lal Pandey	Bharatiya Janata Party		Lost
15	Bilaspur	SC	Punnulal Mohle	Bharatiya Janata Party		Won
16	Sarangarh	SC	P.R. Khute	Bharatiya Janata Party		Lost
17	Raipur	None	Ramesh Bais	Bharatiya Janata Party		Won
18	Mahasamund	None	Chandra Shekhar Sahu	Bharatiya Janata Party		Won
19	Kanker	ST	Sohan Potai	Bharatiya Janata Party		Won
20	Bastar	ST	Baliram Kashyap	Bharatiya Janata Party		Won
21	Durg	None	Tarachand Sahu	Bharatiya Janata Party		Won
22	Rajnandgaon	None	Ashok Sharma	Bharatiya Janata Party		Lost
23	Balaghat	None	Gaurishankar Bisen	Bharatiya Janata Party		Won
24	Mandla	ST	Faggan Singh Kulaste	Bharatiya Janata Party		Won
25	Jabalpur	None	Baburao Paranjpe	Bharatiya Janata Party		Won
26	Seoni	None	Prahlad Singh Patel	Bharatiya Janata Party		Lost
27	Chhindwara	None	Sunder Lal Patwa	Bharatiya Janata Party		Lost
28	Betul	None	Vijay Kumar Khandelwal	Bharatiya Janata Party		Won
29	Hoshangabad	None	Sartaj Singh Chhatwal	Bharatiya Janata Party		Won
30	Bhopal	None	Sushil Chandra Varma	Bharatiya Janata Party		Won
31	Vidisha	None	Shivraj Singh Chouhan	Bharatiya Janata Party		Won
32	Rajgarh	None	Kailash Joshi	Bharatiya Janata Party		Lost
33	Shajapur	SC	Thawar Chand Gehlot	Bharatiya Janata Party		Won
34	Khandwa	None	Nandkumar Singh Chauhan	Bharatiya Janata Party		Won
35	Khargone	None	Rameshwar Patidar	Bharatiya Janata Party		Won
36	Dhar	ST	Hemlata Singh Darbar	Bharatiya Janata Party		Lost
37	Indore	None	Sumitra Mahajan	Bharatiya Janata Party		Won
38	Ujjain	SC	Satyanarayan Jatiya	Bharatiya Janata Party		Won
39	Jhabua	ST	Dileep Singh Bhuria	Bharatiya Janata Party		Lost
40	Mandsaur	None	Laxminarayan Pandey	Bharatiya Janata Party		Won

== Maharashtra ==
BJP (25) SS (22) IND (1)

Constituency No.	Constituency	Reserved for (SC/ST/None)	Candidate	Party	Poll On	Result
1	Rajapur	None	Suresh Prabhu	Shiv Sena		Won
2	Ratnagiri	None	Anant Geete	Shiv Sena		Won
3	Kolaba	None	Anant Tare	Shiv Sena		Lost
4	Mumbai South	None	Jayawantiben Mehta	Bharatiya Janata Party		Lost
5	Mumbai South Central	None	Mohan Rawale	Shiv Sena		Won
6	Mumbai North Central	None	Narayan Athawale	Shiv Sena		Lost
7	Mumbai North East	None	Pramod Mahajan	Bharatiya Janata Party		Lost
8	Mumbai North West	None	Madhukar Sarpotdar	Shiv Sena		Won
9	Mumbai North	None	Ram Naik	Bharatiya Janata Party		Won
10	Thane	None	Prakash Paranjape	Shiv Sena		Won
11	Dahanu	ST	Chintaman Vanaga	Bharatiya Janata Party		Lost
12	Nashik	None	Rajaram Godase	Shiv Sena		Lost
13	Malegaon	ST	Kacharu Bhau Raut	Bharatiya Janata Party		Lost
14	Dhule	ST	Ramdas Rupla Gavit	Bharatiya Janata Party		Lost
15	Nandurbar	ST	Kuwarsing Fulji Valvi	Bharatiya Janata Party		Lost
16	Erandol	None	Annasaheb M. K. Patil	Bharatiya Janata Party		Won
17	Jalgaon	None	Gunwantrao Rambhau Sarode	Bharatiya Janata Party		Lost
18	Buldhana	SC	Anandrao Vithoba Adsul	Shiv Sena		Lost
19	Akola	None	Pandurang Fundkar	Bharatiya Janata Party		Lost
20	Washim	None	Dnyaneshwar Keshaorao Shewale	Shiv Sena		Lost
21	Amravati	None	Anant Gudhe	Shiv Sena		Lost
22	Ramtek	None	Ashok Gujar	Shiv Sena		Lost
23	Nagpur	None	Ramesh Mantri	Bharatiya Janata Party		Lost
24	Bhandara	None	Narayandas Durgaprasadji	Bharatiya Janata Party		Lost
25	Chimur	None	Namdeo Diwathe	Bharatiya Janata Party		Lost
26	Chandrapur	None	Hansraj Gangaram Ahir	Bharatiya Janata Party		Lost
27	Wardha	None	Vijay Mude	Bharatiya Janata Party		Lost
28	Yavatmal	None	Rajabhau Thakare	Bharatiya Janata Party		Lost
29	Hingoli	None	Shivaji Mane	Shiv Sena		Lost
30	Nanded	None	Dhanajirao Deshmukh	Bharatiya Janata Party		Lost
31	Parbhani	None	Suresh Jadhav	Shiv Sena		Lost
32	Jalna	None	Uttamsingh Pawar	Bharatiya Janata Party		Won
33	Aurangabad	None	Pradeep Jaiswal	Shiv Sena		Lost
34	Beed	None	Jaisingrao Gaikwad Patil	Bharatiya Janata Party		Won
35	Latur	None	Gopalrao Patil	Bharatiya Janata Party		Lost
36	Osmanabad	SC	Shivaji Kamble	Shiv Sena		Lost
37	Sholapur	None	Lingaraj Valyal	Bharatiya Janata Party		Lost
38	Pandharpur	SC	Chagdeo Sukhdeo Kamble	Bharatiya Janata Party		Lost
39	Ahmednagar	None	Balasaheb Vikhe Patil	Shiv Sena		Won
40	Kopargaon	None	Bhimrao Badade	Bharatiya Janata Party		Lost
41	Khed	None	Nana Balkawade	Shiv Sena		Lost
42	Pune	None	Suresh Kalmadi	Independent		Lost
43	Baramati	None	Viraj Kakade	Bharatiya Janata Party		Lost
44	Satara	None	Hindurao Naik Nimbalkar	Shiv Sena		Lost
45	Karad	None	Jayawantrao Bhosale	Shiv Sena		Lost
46	Sangli	None	Ramachandra Dange	Bharatiya Janata Party		Lost
47	Ichalkaranji	None	Nivedita Mane	Shiv Sena		Lost
48	Kolhapur	None	Vikramsinh Ghatge	Shiv Sena		Lost

== Manipur ==
MSCP (1) BJP (1)

Constituency No.	Constituency	Reserved for (SC/ST/None)	Candidate	Party	Poll On	Result
1	Inner Manipur	None	Thounaojam Chaoba Singh	Manipur State Congress Party		Won
2	Outer Manipur	ST	Hokkhomang Haokip	Bharatiya Janata Party		Lost

== Meghalaya ==
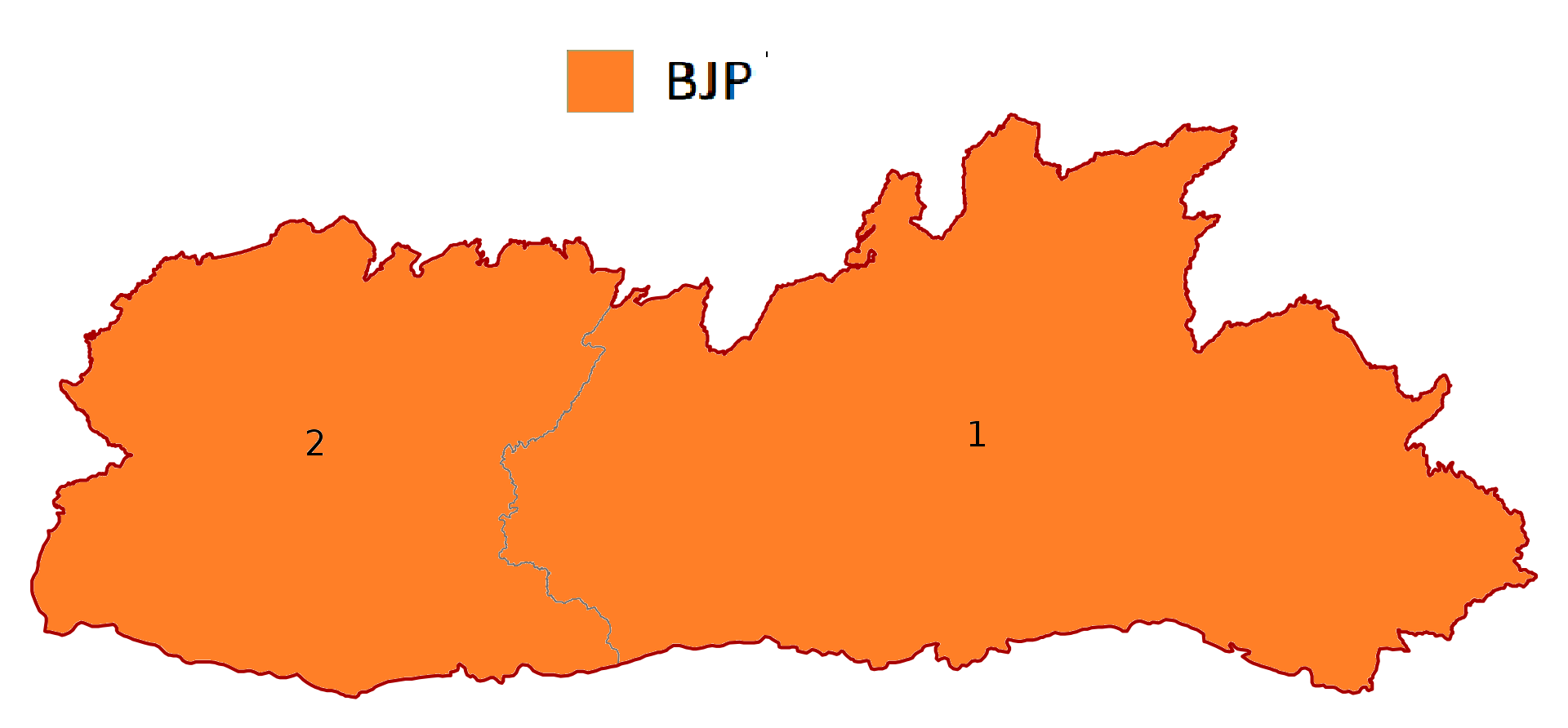

BJP (2)

Constituency No.	Constituency	Reserved for (SC/ST/None)	Candidate	Party	Poll On	Result
1	Shillong	None	Elizabeth Laitflang	Bharatiya Janata Party		Lost
2	Tura	None	Anilla D. Shira	Bharatiya Janata Party		Lost

== Mizoram ==
BJP (1)

Constituency No.	Constituency	Reserved for (SC/ST/None)	Candidate	Party	Poll On	Result
1	Mizoram	ST	P.L. Chhuma	Bharatiya Janata Party		Lost

== Nagaland ==
LS (1)

Constituency No.	Constituency	Reserved for (SC/ST/None)	Candidate	Party	Poll On	Result
1	Nagaland	None	Akhei Achumi	Lok Shakti		Lost

== Odisha ==
BJD (12) BJP (9)

Constituency No.	Constituency	Reserved for (SC/ST/None)	Candidate	Party	Poll On	Result
1	Mayurbhanj	ST	Salkhan Murmu	Bharatiya Janata Party		Won
2	Balasore	None	Kharabela Swain	Bharatiya Janata Party		Won
3	Bhadrak	SC	Arjun Charan Sethi	Biju Janata Dal		Won
4	Jajpur	SC	Jagannath Mallick	Biju Janata Dal		Lost
5	Kendrapara	None	Prabhat Kumar Samantaray	Biju Janata Dal		Won
6	Cuttack	None	Bhartruhari Mahtab	Biju Janata Dal		Won
7	Jagatsinghpur	None	Trilochan Kanungo	Biju Janata Dal		Lost
8	Puri	None	Braja Kishore Tripathy	Biju Janata Dal		Won
9	Bhubaneswar	None	Prasanna Kumar Patasani	Biju Janata Dal		Won
10	Aska	None	Naveen Patnaik	Biju Janata Dal		Won
11	Berhampur	None	Gopinath Gajapati	Bharatiya Janata Party		Lost
12	Koraput	ST	Jayaram Pangi	Biju Janata Dal		Lost
13	Nowrangpur	ST	Parsuram Majhi	Bharatiya Janata Party		Lost
14	Kalahandi	None	Bikram Keshari Deo	Bharatiya Janata Party		Won
15	Phulbani	SC	Padmanava Behara	Biju Janata Dal		Won
16	Bolangir	None	Sangeeta Kumari Singh Deo	Bharatiya Janata Party		Won
17	Sambalpur	None	Prasanna Acharya	Biju Janata Dal		Won
18	Deogarh	None	Debendra Pradhan	Bharatiya Janata Party		Won
19	Dhenkanal	None	Tathagata Satpathy	Biju Janata Dal		Won
20	Sundargarh	ST	Jual Oram	Bharatiya Janata Party		Won
21	Keonjhar	ST	Upendra Nath Nayak	Bharatiya Janata Party		Won

== Punjab ==
SAD (8) BJP (3) IND (1)

Constituency No.	Constituency	Reserved for (SC/ST/None)	Candidate	Party	Poll On	Result
1	Gurdaspur	None	Vinod Khanna	Bharatiya Janata Party		Won
2	Amritsar	None	Daya Singh Sodhi	Bharatiya Janata Party		Won
3	Tarn Taran	None	Prem Singh Lalpur	Shiromani Akali Dal		Won
4	Jullundur	None	None			
5	Phillaur	SC	Satnam Singh Kainth	Independent		Won
6	Hoshiarpur	None	Kamal Chaudhry	Bharatiya Janata Party		Won
7	Ropar	SC	Satwinder Kaur Dhaliwal	Shiromani Akali Dal		Won
8	Patiala	None	Prem Singh Chandumajra	Shiromani Akali Dal		Won
9	Ludhiana	None	Amrik Singh Aliwal	Shiromani Akali Dal		Won
10	Sangrur	None	Surjit Singh Barnala	Shiromani Akali Dal		Won
11	Bhatinda	SC	Chatin Singh Samaon	Shiromani Akali Dal		Won
12	Faridkot	None	Sukhbir Singh Badal	Shiromani Akali Dal		Won
13	Ferozepur	None	Zora Singh Maan	Shiromani Akali Dal		Won

== Rajasthan ==
BJP (25)

Constituency No.	Constituency	Reserved for (SC/ST/None)	Candidate	Party	Poll On	Result
1	Ganganagar	SC	Nihalchand Meghwal	Bharatiya Janata Party		Lost
2	Bikaner	None	Mahendra Singh Bhati	Bharatiya Janata Party		Lost
3	Churu	None	Ram Singh Kaswan	Bharatiya Janata Party		Lost
4	Jhunjhunu	GEN	Madan Lal Saini	Bharatiya Janata Party		Lost
5	Sikar	None	Subhash Maharia	Bharatiya Janata Party		Won
6	Jaipur	None	Girdhari Lal Bhargava	Bharatiya Janata Party		Won
7	Dausa	None	Rohitash Kumar Sharma	Bharatiya Janata Party		Lost
8	Alwar	None	Jaswant Singh Yadav	Bharatiya Janata Party		Lost
9	Bharatpur	None	Digamber Singh	Bharatiya Janata Party		Lost
10	Bayana	SC	Ganga Ram Koli	Bharatiya Janata Party		Won
11	Sawai Madhopur	ST	Ramesh Chand	Bharatiya Janata Party		Lost
12	Ajmer	None	Rasa Singh Rawat	Bharatiya Janata Party		Lost
13	Tonk	SC	Shambhu Dayal Badgujar	Bharatiya Janata Party		Lost
14	Kota	None	Raghuveer Singh Koshal	Bharatiya Janata Party		Lost
15	Jhalawar	None	Vasundhara Raje	Bharatiya Janata Party		Won
16	Banswara	ST	Laxmi Ninama	Bharatiya Janata Party		Lost
17	Salumber	ST	Nand Lal Meena	Bharatiya Janata Party		Lost
18	Udaipur	None	Shanti Lal Chaplot	Bharatiya Janata Party		Won
19	Chittorgarh	None	Jaswant Singh	Bharatiya Janata Party		Lost
20	Bhilwara	None	Subhash Chandra Baheria	Bharatiya Janata Party		Lost
21	Pali	None	Guman Mal Lodha	Bharatiya Janata Party		Lost
22	Jalore	SC	Genaram	Bharatiya Janata Party		Lost
23	Barmer	None	Lokendra Singh Kalvi	Bharatiya Janata Party		Lost
24	Jodhpur	None	Jaswant Singh Bishnoi	Bharatiya Janata Party		Lost
25	Nagaur	None	Richhpalsingh Mirdha	Bharatiya Janata Party		Lost

== Sikkim ==
SDF (1)

Constituency No.	Constituency	Reserved for (SC/ST/None)	Candidate	Party	Poll On	Result
1	Sikkim	None	Bhim Prasad Dahal	Sikkim Democratic Front		Won

== Tamil Nadu ==
AIADMK (22) PMK (5) BJP (5) MDMK (5) JP (1) IND (1)

Constituency No.	Constituency	Reserved for (SC/ST/None)	Candidate	Party	Poll On	Result
1	Madras North	None	R.T. Sabapathy Mohan	Marumalarchi Dravida Munnetra Kazhagam		Lost
2	Madras Central	None	D. Jayakumar	All India Anna Dravida Munnetra Kazhagam		Lost
3	Madras South	None	Jana Krishnamurthi	Bharatiya Janata Party		Lost
4	Sriperumbudur	SC	K. Venugopal	All India Anna Dravida Munnetra Kazhagam		Won
5	Chengalpattu	None	Kanchi Panneerselvam	All India Anna Dravida Munnetra Kazhagam		Won
6	Arakkonam	None	C. Gopal Mudaliyar	All India Anna Dravida Munnetra Kazhagam		Won
7	Vellore	None	N. T. Shanmugam	Pattali Makkal Katchi		Won
8	Tirupattur	None	S.Krishnamoorthy	All India Anna Dravida Munnetra Kazhagam		Lost
9	Vandavasi	None	M. Durai	Pattali Makkal Katchi		Won
10	Tindivanam	None	Gingee N. Ramachandran	Marumalarchi Dravida Munnetra Kazhagam		Won
11	Cuddalore	None	M. C. Dhamodaran	All India Anna Dravida Munnetra Kazhagam		Won
12	Chidambaram	SC	Dalit Ezhilmalai	Pattali Makkal Katchi		Won
13	Dharmapuri	None	K. Pary Mohan	Pattali Makkal Katchi		Won
14	Krishnagiri	None	K. P. Munusamy	All India Anna Dravida Munnetra Kazhagam		Won
15	Rasipuram	SC	V. Saroja	All India Anna Dravida Munnetra Kazhagam		Won
16	Salem	None	Vazhappady K. Ramamurthy	Independent		Won
17	Tiruchengode	None	Edappadi K. Palaniswami	All India Anna Dravida Munnetra Kazhagam		Won
18	Nilgiris	None	M Master Mathan	Bharatiya Janata Party		Won
19	Gobichettipalayam	None	V. K. Chinnasamy	All India Anna Dravida Munnetra Kazhagam		Won
20	Coimbatore	None	C. P. Radhakrishnan	Bharatiya Janata Party		Won
21	Pollachi	SC	M. Thiyagarajan	All India Anna Dravida Munnetra Kazhagam		Won
22	Palani	None	A. Ganeshamurthi	Marumalarchi Dravida Munnetra Kazhagam		Won
23	Dindigul	None	Dindigul C. Srinivasan	All India Anna Dravida Munnetra Kazhagam		Won
24	Madurai	None	Subramanian Swamy	Janata Party		Won
25	Periyakulam	None	Sedapatti Muthiah	All India Anna Dravida Munnetra Kazhagam		Won
26	Karur	None	M. Thambidurai	All India Anna Dravida Munnetra Kazhagam		Won
27	Tiruchirappalli	None	Rangarajan Kumaramangalam	Bharatiya Janata Party		Won
28	Perambalur	SC	P. Raja Rethinam	All India Anna Dravida Munnetra Kazhagam		Won
29	Mayiladuthurai	None	P. D. Arul Mozhi	Pattali Makkal Katchi		Lost
30	Nagapattinam	SC	K. Gopal	All India Anna Dravida Munnetra Kazhagam		Lost
31	Thanjavur	None	L Ganesan	Marumalarchi Dravida Munnetra Kazhagam		Lost
32	Pudukkottai	None	Raja Paramasivam	All India Anna Dravida Munnetra Kazhagam		Won
33	Sivaganga	None	K. Kalimuthu	All India Anna Dravida Munnetra Kazhagam		Lost
34	Ramanathapuram	None	V. Sathiamoorthy	All India Anna Dravida Munnetra Kazhagam		Won
35	Sivakasi	None	Vaiko	Marumalarchi Dravida Munnetra Kazhagam		Won
36	Tirunelveli	None	Kadambur R. Janarthanan	All India Anna Dravida Munnetra Kazhagam		Won
37	Tenkasi	SC	S. Murugesan	All India Anna Dravida Munnetra Kazhagam		Won
38	Tiruchendur	None	Ramarajan	All India Anna Dravida Munnetra Kazhagam		Won
39	Nagercoil	None	Pon Radhakrishnan	Bharatiya Janata Party		Lost

== Tripura ==
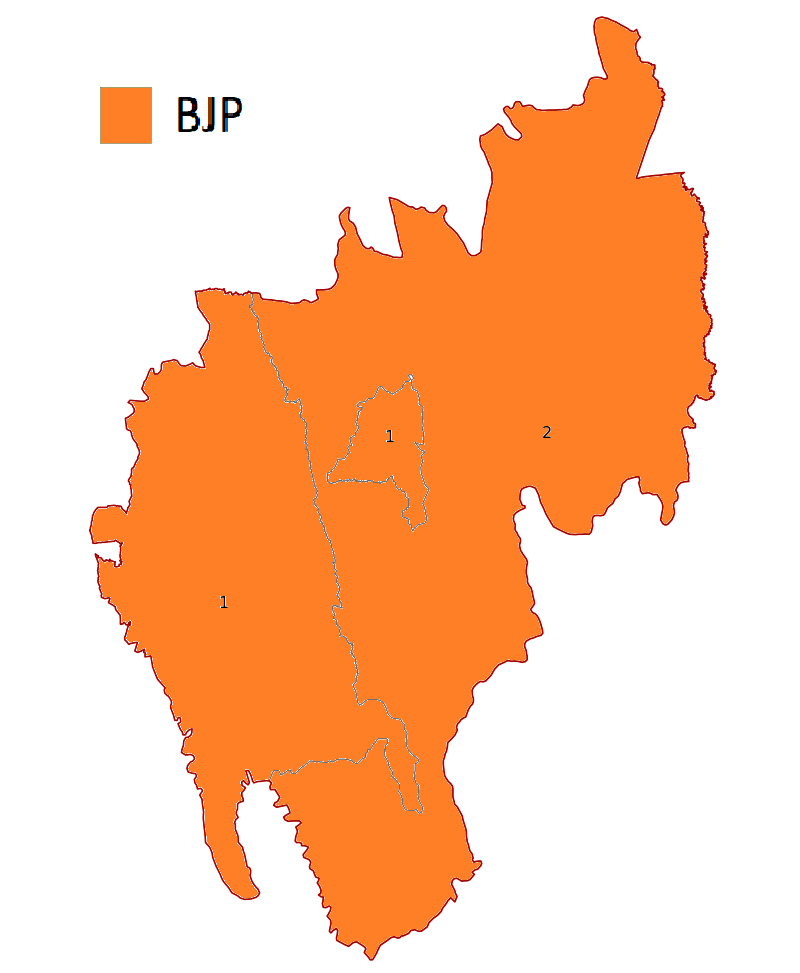

BJP (2)

Constituency No.	Constituency	Reserved for (SC/ST/None)	Candidate	Party	Poll On	Result
1	Tripura West	None	Hemendu Sankar Roy Choudhury	Bharatiya Janata Party		Lost
2	Tripura East	ST	Jishnu Dev Varma	Bharatiya Janata Party		Lost

== Uttar Pradesh ==
BJP (82) SAP (2) IND (1)

Constituency No.	Constituency	Reserved for (SC/ST/None)	Candidate	Party	Poll On	Result
1	Tehri Garhwal	None	Manabendra Shah	Bharatiya Janata Party		Won
2	Garhwal	None	B. C. Khanduri	Bharatiya Janata Party		Won
3	Almora	None	Bachi Singh Rawat	Bharatiya Janata Party		Won
4	Nainital	None	Ila Pant	Bharatiya Janata Party		Won
5	Bijnor	SC	Mangal Ram Premi	Bharatiya Janata Party		Lost
6	Amroha	None	Chetan Chauhan	Bharatiya Janata Party		Won
7	Moradabad	None	Vijay Bansal	Bharatiya Janata Party		Lost
8	Rampur	None	Mukhtar Abbas Naqvi	Bharatiya Janata Party		Won
9	Sambhal	None	D. P. Yadav	Bharatiya Janata Party		Lost
10	Budaun	None	Shanti Devi Shakya	Bharatiya Janata Party		Lost
11	Aonla	None	Raj Veer Singh	Bharatiya Janata Party		Won
12	Bareilly	None	Santosh Gangwar	Bharatiya Janata Party		Won
13	Pilibhit	None	Maneka Gandhi	Independent		Won
14	Shahjahanpur	None	Satyapal Singh Yadav	Bharatiya Janata Party		Won
15	Kheri	None	Gendan Lal Kanaujia	Bharatiya Janata Party		Lost
16	Shahabad	None	Raghvendra Singh	Bharatiya Janata Party		Won
17	Sitapur	None	Janardan Prasad Mishra	Bharatiya Janata Party		Won
18	Misrikh	SC	Daulat Ram	Bharatiya Janata Party		Lost
19	Hardoi	SC	Jai Prakash Rawat	Bharatiya Janata Party		Lost
20	Lucknow	None	Atal Bihari Vajpayee	Bharatiya Janata Party		Won
21	Mohanlalganj	SC	Purnima Verma	Bharatiya Janata Party		Lost
22	Unnao	None	Devi Bux Singh	Bharatiya Janata Party		Won
23	Raebareli	None	Ashok Singh	Bharatiya Janata Party		Won
24	Pratapgarh	None	Ram Vilas Vedanti	Bharatiya Janata Party		Won
25	Amethi	None	Sanjaya Sinh	Bharatiya Janata Party		Won
26	Sultanpur	None	Devendra Bahadur Roy	Bharatiya Janata Party		Won
27	Akbarpur	SC	Triveni Ram	Bharatiya Janata Party		Lost
28	Faizabad	None	Vinay Katiyar	Bharatiya Janata Party		Lost
29	Bara Banki	SC	Baij Nath Rawat	Bharatiya Janata Party		Won
30	Kaiserganj	None	Ghyanshyam Shukla	Bharatiya Janata Party		Lost
31	Bahraich	None	Padamsen Chaudhary	Bharatiya Janata Party		Lost
32	Balrampur	None	Satya Deo Singh	Bharatiya Janata Party		Lost
33	Gonda	None	Brij Bhushan Sharan Singh	Bharatiya Janata Party		Lost
34	Basti	SC	Sriram Chauhan	Bharatiya Janata Party		Won
35	Domariaganj	None	Ram Pal Singh	Bharatiya Janata Party		Won
36	Khalilabad	None	Indrajeet Mishra	Bharatiya Janata Party		Won
37	Bansgaon	SC	Raj Narain Passi	Bharatiya Janata Party		Won
38	Gorakhpur	None	Yogi Adityanath	Bharatiya Janata Party		Won
39	Maharajganj	None	Pankaj Choudhary	Bharatiya Janata Party		Won
40	Padrauna	None	Ram Nagina Mishra	Bharatiya Janata Party		Won
41	Deoria	None	Prakash Mani Tripathi	Bharatiya Janata Party		Lost
42	Salempur	None	Hari Kewal Prasad	Samata Party		Won
43	Ballia	None	Ram Krishna	Bharatiya Janata Party		Lost
44	Ghosi	None	Kalpnath Rai	Samata Party		Won
45	Azamgarh	None	Yashwant	Bharatiya Janata Party		Lost
46	Lalganj	SC	Ram Dhan	Bharatiya Janata Party		Lost
47	Machhlishahr	None	Swami Chinmayanand	Bharatiya Janata Party		Won
48	Jaunpur	None	Raj Keshar Singh	Bharatiya Janata Party		Lost
49	Saidpur	SC	Vijay Sonkar Shastri	Bharatiya Janata Party		Won
50	Ghazipur	None	Manoj Sinha	Bharatiya Janata Party		Lost
51	Chandauli	None	Ananda Ratna Maurya	Bharatiya Janata Party		Won
52	Varanasi	None	Shankar Prasad Jaiswal	Bharatiya Janata Party		Won
53	Robertsganj	SC	Ram Shakal	Bharatiya Janata Party		Won
54	Mirzapur	None	Virendra Singh	Bharatiya Janata Party		Won
55	Phulpur	None	Beni Madhav Bind	Bharatiya Janata Party		Lost
56	Allahabad	None	Murli Manohar Joshi	Bharatiya Janata Party		Won
57	Chail	SC	Amrit Lal Bharti	Bharatiya Janata Party		Lost
58	Fatehpur	None	Ashok Kumar Patel	Bharatiya Janata Party		Won
59	Banda	None	Ramesh Chandra Dwivedi	Bharatiya Janata Party		Won
60	Hamirpur	None	Ganga Charan Rajput	Bharatiya Janata Party		Won
61	Jhansi	None	Rajendra Agnihotri	Bharatiya Janata Party		Won
62	Jalaun	SC	Bhanu Pratap Singh Verma	Bharatiya Janata Party		Won
63	Ghatampur	SC	Kamal Rani Varun	Bharatiya Janata Party		Won
64	Bilhaur	None	Shyam Bihari Misra	Bharatiya Janata Party		Won
65	Kanpur	None	Jagatvir Singh Drona	Bharatiya Janata Party		Won
66	Etawah	None	Sukhda Misra	Bharatiya Janata Party		Won
67	Kannauj	None	Chandrabhoo Shan Singh	Bharatiya Janata Party		Lost
68	Farrukhabad	None	Sakshi Maharaj	Bharatiya Janata Party		Won
69	Mainpuri	None	Ashok Yadav	Bharatiya Janata Party		Lost
70	Jalesar	None	Ompal Singh Nidar	Bharatiya Janata Party		Lost
71	Etah	None	Mahadeepak Singh Shakya	Bharatiya Janata Party		Won
72	Firozabad	SC	Prabhu Dayal Katheria	Bharatiya Janata Party		Won
73	Agra	None	Bhagwan Shankar Rawat	Bharatiya Janata Party		Won
74	Mathura	None	Chaudhary Tejveer Singh	Bharatiya Janata Party		Won
75	Hathras	SC	Kishan Lal Diler	Bharatiya Janata Party		Won
76	Aligarh	None	Sheela Gautam	Bharatiya Janata Party		Won
77	Khurja	SC	Ashok Kumar Pradhan	Bharatiya Janata Party		Won
78	Bulandshahr	None	Chhatrapal Singh Lodha	Bharatiya Janata Party		Won
79	Hapur	None	Ramesh Chand Tomar	Bharatiya Janata Party		Won
80	Meerut	None	Amar Pal Singh	Bharatiya Janata Party		Won
81	Baghpat	None	Sompal Shastri	Bharatiya Janata Party		Won
82	Muzaffarnagar	None	Sohanveer Singh	Bharatiya Janata Party		Won
83	Kairana	None	Virendra Verma	Bharatiya Janata Party		Won
84	Saharanpur	None	Nakli Singh	Bharatiya Janata Party		Won
85	Haridwar	SC	Harpal Singh Sathi	Bharatiya Janata Party		Won

== West Bengal ==
WBTC (28) BJP (14)

Constituency No.	Constituency	Reserved for (SC/ST/None)	Candidate	Party	Poll On	Result
1	Cooch Behar	SC	Prasenjit Barman	West Bengal Trinamool Congress		Lost
2	Alipurduars	ST	Dhirendra Narjinarai	Bharatiya Janata Party		Lost
3	Jalpaiguri	None	Kalyan Chakraborty	West Bengal Trinamool Congress		Lost
4	Darjeeling	None	Dawa Narbula	West Bengal Trinamool Congress		Lost
5	Raiganj	None	Rahul Sinha	Bharatiya Janata Party		Lost
6	Balurghat	SC	Nani Gopal Roy	West Bengal Trinamool Congress		Lost
7	Malda	None	Muzaffar Khan	Bharatiya Janata Party		Lost
8	Jangipur	None	SK Furkan	West Bengal Trinamool Congress		Lost
9	Murshidabad	None	Sagir Hossain	West Bengal Trinamool Congress		Lost
10	Berhampore	None	Sabyasachi Bagchi	Bharatiya Janata Party		Lost
11	Krishnagar	None	Satyabrata Mookherjee	Bharatiya Janata Party		Lost
12	Nabadwip	SC	Ramendra Nath Biswas	West Bengal Trinamool Congress		Lost
13	Barasat	None	Ranjit Kumar Panja	West Bengal Trinamool Congress		Won
14	Basirhat	None	Sudipto Roy	West Bengal Trinamool Congress		Lost
15	Joynagar	SC	Krishnapada Majumder	Bharatiya Janata Party		Lost
16	Mathurapur	SC	Jagaranjan Haldar	West Bengal Trinamool Congress		Lost
17	Diamond Harbour	None	Kakoli Ghosh Dastidar	West Bengal Trinamool Congress		Lost
18	Jadavpur	None	Krishna Bose	West Bengal Trinamool Congress		Won
19	Barrackpore	None	Tarun Adhikari	West Bengal Trinamool Congress		Lost
20	Dum Dum	None	Tapan Sikdar	Bharatiya Janata Party		Won
21	Calcutta North West	None	Sudip Bandyopadhyay	West Bengal Trinamool Congress		Won
22	Calcutta North East	None	Ajit Kumar Panja	West Bengal Trinamool Congress		Won
23	Calcutta South	None	Mamata Banerjee	West Bengal Trinamool Congress		Won
24	Howrah	None	Bikram Sarkar	West Bengal Trinamool Congress		Won
25	Uluberia	None	Saradindu Biswas	West Bengal Trinamool Congress		Lost
26	Serampore	None	Akbar Ali Khondkar	West Bengal Trinamool Congress		Won
27	Hooghly	None	Tapan Dasgupta	West Bengal Trinamool Congress		Lost
28	Arambagh	None	Chunilal Chakraborty	Bharatiya Janata Party		Lost
29	Panskura	None	Saumen Mahapatra	West Bengal Trinamool Congress		Lost
30	Tamluk	None	Nirmalendu Bhattacharjee	West Bengal Trinamool Congress		Lost
31	Contai	None	Akhil Giri	West Bengal Trinamool Congress		Lost
32	Midnapore	None	Manoranjan Dutta	Bharatiya Janata Party		Lost
33	Jhargram	ST	Samay Mandi	West Bengal Trinamool Congress		Lost
34	Purulia	None	Arun Gupta	Bharatiya Janata Party		Lost
35	Bankura	None	Sukumar Banerjee	Bharatiya Janata Party		Lost
36	Vishnupur	SC	Purnima Lohar	West Bengal Trinamool Congress		Lost
37	Durgapur	SC	Surya Ray	Bharatiya Janata Party		Lost
38	Asansol	None	Moloy Ghatak	West Bengal Trinamool Congress		Lost
39	Burdwan	None	Santi Roy	Bharatiya Janata Party		Lost
40	Katwa	None	Swapan Debnath	West Bengal Trinamool Congress		Lost
41	Bolpur	None	Gour Hari Chand	West Bengal Trinamool Congress		Lost
42	Birbhum	SC	Madan Lal Choudhury	Bharatiya Janata Party		Lost

== Andaman and Nicobar Islands ==
BJP (1)

Constituency No.	Constituency	Reserved for (SC/ST/None)	Candidate	Party	Poll On	Result
1	Andaman and Nicobar Islands	None	Bishnu Pada Ray	Bharatiya Janata Party		Lost

== Chandigarh ==
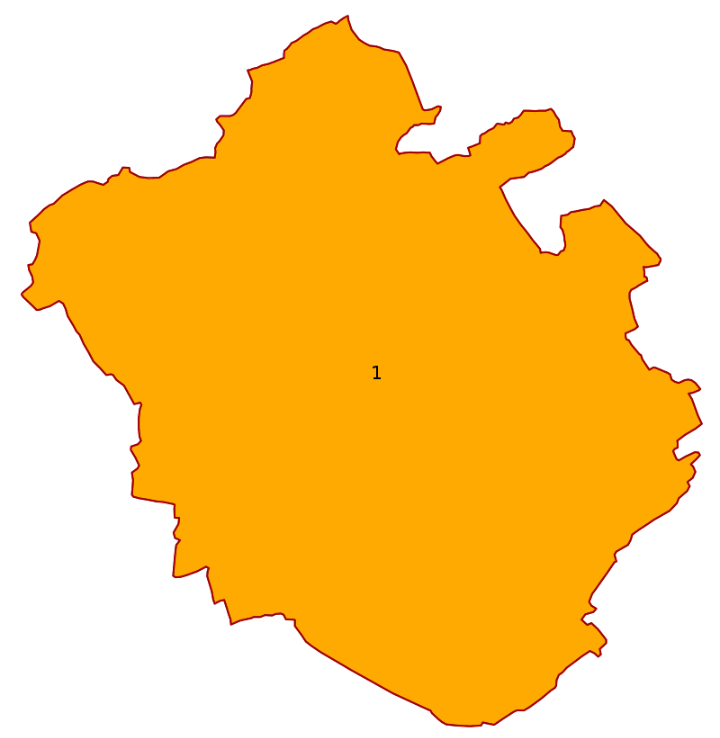

BJP (1)

Constituency No.	Constituency	Reserved for (SC/ST/None)	Candidate	Party	Poll On	Result
1	Chandigarh	None	Satya Pal Jain	Bharatiya Janata Party		Won

== Dadra and Nagar Haveli ==
BJP (1)

Constituency No.	Constituency	Reserved for (SC/ST/None)	Candidate	Party	Poll On	Result
1	Dadra and Nagar Haveli	None	Mohanbhai Sanjibhai Delkar	Bharatiya Janata Party		Won

== Daman and Diu ==
BJP (1)

Constituency No.	Constituency	Reserved for (SC/ST/None)	Candidate	Party	Poll On	Result
1	Daman and Diu	None	Devjibhai Tandel	Bharatiya Janata Party		Won

== Lakshadweep ==
Constituency No.	Constituency	Reserved for (SC/ST/None)	Candidate	Party	Poll On	Result
1	Lakshadweep	ST	None			

== NCT of Delhi ==
BJP (7)

Constituency No.	Constituency	Reserved for (SC/ST/None)	Candidate	Party	Poll On	Result
1	New Delhi	None	Jagmohan	Bharatiya Janata Party		Won
2	South Delhi	None	Sushma Swaraj	Bharatiya Janata Party		Won
3	Outer Delhi	None	Krishan Lal Sharma	Bharatiya Janata Party		Won
4	East Delhi	None	Lal Bihari Tiwari	Bharatiya Janata Party		Won
5	Chandni Chowk	None	Vijay Goel	Bharatiya Janata Party		Won
6	Delhi Sadar	None	Madan Lal Khurana	Bharatiya Janata Party		Won
7	Karol Bagh	SC	Surender Pal Ratawal	Bharatiya Janata Party		Lost

== Puducherry ==
AIADMK (1)

Constituency No.	Constituency	Reserved for (SC/ST/None)	Candidate	Party	Poll On	Result
1	Pondicherry	None	Lucky R Perumal	All India Anna Dravida Munnetra Kazhagam		Lost

== See also ==
List of National Democratic Alliance candidates in the 1998 Indian general election
List of National Democratic Alliance candidates in the 1999 Indian general election
List of National Democratic Alliance candidates in the 2004 Indian general election
List of National Democratic Alliance candidates in the 2009 Indian general election
List of National Democratic Alliance candidates in the 2014 Indian general election
List of National Democratic Alliance candidates in the 2019 Indian general election
List of National Democratic Alliance candidates in the 2024 Indian general election
