= Elections in Karnataka =

Karnataka (highlighted) within India

Elections in Karnataka, a state in India are conducted in accordance with the Constitution of India. The Karnataka Legislature creates laws regarding the conduct of local body elections unilaterally while any changes by the state legislature to the conduct of state level elections need to be approved by the Parliament of India. In addition, the state legislature may be dismissed by the Parliament according to Article 356 of the Indian Constitution and President's rule may be imposed.

== Main Political Parties in Karnataka ==
BJP, INC and JD(S) are the dominant parties in the state. The CPI, CPI(M) and MES are the other active political entities in the state. In the past, the various precursors of the JD(S) such as JP and JD have also been very influential. Splinter groups such as KCP, KJP, BSR Congress, Lok Shakti and JD(U) have made their mark in a few elections. Erstwhile parties which have been influential in the state include Indian National Congress (Organisation) (NCO), Bharatiya Jana Sangh, Kisan Mazdoor Praja Party (KMPP), National Development Party, Praja Socialist Party (PSP), Samyukta Socialist Party (SSP) and Swatantra Party.

== Lok Sabha elections ==
Lok Sabha	Election year	1st party	2nd party	Others	Total seats
1952	1st	INC 10	KMPP 1		11
1957	2nd	INC 23	PSP 1	SCF 1, IND 1	26
1962	3rd	INC 25	LSS 1		26
1967	4th	INC 18	SWP 5	PSP 2, SSP 1, IND 1	27
1971	5th	INC 27			27
1977	6th	INC 26	JP 2		28
1980	7th	INC 27	JP 1		28
1984	8th	INC 24	JP 4		28
1989	9th	INC 26	JD 2		28
1991	10th	INC 23	BJP 4	JP 1	28
1996	11th	JD 16	BJP 6	INC 5, KCP 1	28
1998	12th	BJP 13	INC 9	LS 3, JD 3	28
1999	13th	INC 18	BJP 7	JD(U) 3	28
2004	14th	BJP 18	INC 8	JD(S) 2	28
2009	15th	BJP 19	INC 6	JD(S) 3	28
2014	16th	BJP 17	INC 9	JD(S) 2	28
2019	17th	BJP 25	INC 1	JD(S) 1, IND 1	28
2024	18th	BJP 17	INC 9	JD(S) 2	28

== Legislative Assembly elections ==
Election year	Assembly	1st party	2nd party	3rd party	Others	Total seats	Chief minister	CM's party
1952	1st	INC 74	KMPP 8		IND 11	99	Kengal Hanumanthaiah	INC
1952	1st	INC 74	KMPP 8		IND 11	99	Kadidal Manjappa	INC
1952	1st	INC 74	KMPP 8		IND 11	99	S. Nijalingappa	INC

Year	Assembly	Party-wise Details	Chief Minister	Party
1952	1st	Total: 99 Seats. Congress: 74, KMPP:8, Independents: 11	Kengal Hanumanthaiah	Congress
1952	1st	Total: 99 Seats. Congress: 74, KMPP:8, Independents: 11	Kadidal Manjappa	Congress
1952	1st	Total: 99 Seats. Congress: 74, KMPP:8, Independents: 11	S. Nijalingappa	Congress
1957	2nd	Total: 208. Congress: 150, PSP:18, Independents: 35.	S. Nijalingappa	Congress
1957	2nd	Total: 208. Congress: 150, PSP:18, Independents: 35.	B. D. Jatti	Congress
1962	3rd	Total: 208. Congress: 138, PSP:20, Swatantra: 9, Independents: 27	S.R. Kanthi	Congress
1962	3rd	Total: 208. Congress: 138, PSP:20, Swatantra: 9, Independents: 27	S. Nijalingappa	Congress
1967	4th	Total: 216. Congress: 126, PSP: 20, Swatantra: 16, SSP: 6, BJS: 4, Independents: 41	S. Nijalingappa	Congress
1967	4th	Total: 216. Congress: 126, PSP: 20, Swatantra: 16, SSP: 6, BJS: 4, Independents: 41	Veerendra Patil	Congress(O)
1972	5th	Total: 216. Congress: 165, NCO: 24, Independents: 20	Devaraj Urs	Congress
1978	6th	Total: 224. Congress (I): 149, Janata: 59, Independents: 10	D. Devaraj Urs	Congress
1978	6th	Total: 224. Congress (I): 149, Janata: 59, Independents: 10	R. Gundu Rao	Congress
1983	7th	Total: 224. Janata: 95, Congress (I): 82, BJP: 18, AIADMK: 1, and Independents: 21	Ramakrishna Hegde	Janata
1985	8th	Total: 224. Janata: 139, Congress: 65, BJP: 2, Independents: 13	Ramakrishna Hegde	Janata
1985	8th	Total: 224. Janata: 139, Congress: 65, BJP: 2, Independents: 13	S. R. Bommai	Janata
1989	9th	Total: 224. Congress: 178, JD: 24, BJP: 4, AIADMK: 1, and Independents: 11	Veerendra Patil	Congress
1989	9th	Total: 224. Congress: 178, JD: 24, BJP: 4, AIADMK: 1, and Independents: 11	S.Bangarappa	Congress
1989	9th	Total: 224. Congress: 178, JD: 24, BJP: 4, AIADMK: 1, and Independents: 11	M. Veerappa Moily	Congress
1994	10th	Total: 224. JD: 115, BJP: 40, Congress: 34, KCP: 10, AIADMK: 1, and Independents: 17	H. D. Deve Gowda	Janata Dal
1994	10th	Total: 224. JD: 115, BJP: 40, Congress: 34, KCP: 10, AIADMK: 1, and Independents: 17	J. H. Patel	Janata Dal
1999	11th	Total: 224. Congress: 132, BJP: 44, JD(U): 18, JD(S): 10, AIADMK: 1, and Independents: 18	S. M. Krishna	Congress
2004	12th	Total: 224. BJP: 79, Congress: 65, JD(S): 58	Dharam Singh	Congress
2004	12th	Total: 224. BJP: 79, Congress: 65, JD(S): 58	H. D. Kumaraswamy	JD(S)
2004	12th	Total: 224. BJP: 79, Congress: 65, JD(S): 58	B. S. Yeddyurappa	BJP
2008	13th	Total: 224. BJP: 110, Congress: 80, JD(S): 28	B. S. Yeddyurappa	BJP
2008	13th	Total: 224. BJP: 110, Congress: 80, JD(S): 28	D. V. Sadananda Gowda	BJP
2008	13th	Total: 224. BJP: 110, Congress: 80, JD(S): 28	Jagadish Shettar	BJP
2013	14th	Total: 224. Congress: 122, BJP: 40, JD(S): 40, KJP: 6, BSR Congress: 4	Siddaramaiah	Congress
2018	15th	Total: 224 BJP: 104, Congress: 80, JD(S): 38, KPJP: 1, BSP: 1, IND: 1. Fifteen MLAs from Congress and JD-S resigned in 2019, forcing a major bye-poll. After the bye-poll, BJP added 12 seats to go to 116 MLAs in the assembly. BSY became CM.	H. D. Kumaraswamy	JD(S) (with Congress)
2018	15th	Total: 224 BJP: 104, Congress: 80, JD(S): 38, KPJP: 1, BSP: 1, IND: 1. Fifteen MLAs from Congress and JD-S resigned in 2019, forcing a major bye-poll. After the bye-poll, BJP added 12 seats to go to 116 MLAs in the assembly. BSY became CM.	B. S. Yeddyurappa	BJP
2018	15th	Total: 224 BJP: 104, Congress: 80, JD(S): 38, KPJP: 1, BSP: 1, IND: 1. Fifteen MLAs from Congress and JD-S resigned in 2019, forcing a major bye-poll. After the bye-poll, BJP added 12 seats to go to 116 MLAs in the assembly. BSY became CM.	Basavaraj Bommai	BJP
2023	16th	Total: 224. INC: 135, BJP: 66, JD(S): 19, Independents: 2, SKP: 1, KRPP: 1	Siddaramaiah	Congress
2023	16th	Total: 224. INC: 135, BJP: 66, JD(S): 19, Independents: 2, SKP: 1, KRPP: 1	D. K. Shivakumar	Congress
