= N. Thippanna =

Chairman of the Karnataka Legislative Council
- In office 1 July 2008 – 5 August 2008

Member of the Karnataka Legislative Council
- In office 2006–2012

Personal details
- Born: November 23, 1928 Turuvanur, Chitradurga district, Karnataka, India
- Died: July 11, 2025 (aged 96) Ballari, Karnataka, India
- Party: Janata Dal (Secular)
- Other political affiliations: Janata Dal (United)
- Children: 1 son
- Occupation: Politician, Lawyer

N. Thippanna (23 November 1928 – 11 July 2025) was an Indian politician, statesman, and educationist, who served as the Chairman (Head of the legislative council) of the Karnataka Legislative Council (the upper house of the Karnataka state legislature) for two terms. He was a close associate of Chief Minister Ramakrishna Hegde.

He died on 11 July 2025, at the age of 97 in Ballari, following age related ailments.

== Early life ==
N. Thippanna was born on November 23, 1928, in Turuvanur village in the Chitradurga district of the erstwhile Mysore State (now Karnataka). He obtained his academic qualifications, a B.A. and B.L. (Bachelor of Arts and Bachelor of Laws).

== Career ==
He started his legal career in 1954 in Ballari and served as District Government Pleader and Public Prosecutor. He later became General Secretary and then President of the Bellary Bar Association. Thippanna also served as Vice President of the Karnataka Bar Council. He was also President of the Karnataka State Advocates Association.

He contested the Lok Sabha elections from Ballari but was not elected.

Following the merger of the Janata Dal factions, he served as the State President of the Janata Dal (Secular). He was elected multiple times to the Karnataka Legislative Council (MLC), with known terms including one from 1994 to 2000 (elected by Local Authorities) and a nominated term from 2006 to 2012. He also held the position of Deputy Leader of the Opposition during his tenure.

He also served one term as a nominated Member of the Karnataka Legislative Council from the Bharatiya Janata Party from 29 May 2010 to 20 May 2012.

He was the President of the Bellary District Central Co-operative Bank in Hospet. Thippanna was General Secretary of the Veerashaiva Vidyavardhaka Sangha in Ballari for over three decades, during which several educational institutions were established. He received an Honorary Doctorate from Vijayanagara Sri Krishnadevaraya University.
