= Kariganur =

Kariganuru
- village
- Location in Karnataka, India Kariganuru (India)
- Coordinates: 14.308°N 75.852°E
- Country: India
- State: Karnataka
- District: Davanagere

Government
  - Body: Gram panchayat

Population
  - Total: 4,000

Languages
  - Official: Kannada
- Time zone: UTC+5:30 (IST)
- PIN: 577219
- Telephone code: 08180
- ISO 3166 code: IN-KA
- Vehicle registration: KA-17
- Nearest city: Davanagere
- Lok Sabha constituency: Davanagere
- Website: karnataka.gov.in

Kariganuru, also known as Kariganuru, is a village in Channagiri Taluk, Davangere District, Karnataka, India. Kariganur is well known for farming and for giving birth to one of the most famous humorous and witty thinkers, the former chief minister of Karnataka late J. H. Patel.

There are number of other villages near Kariganur, like hadadi, kukkawada, thyavanige etc...

Kaleswara guddi is in Kariganur, which is temple of Shiva and every year mostly in the month of April there will be rathotsava, which is like Bangalore Karga, Usually many people gather for this rathotsava.
