= Taradevi Siddhartha =

Indian politician

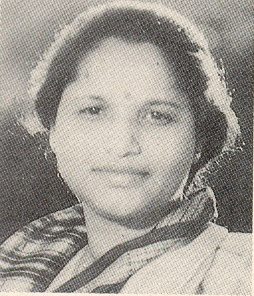
- Born: 1953 (age 72–73)

D.K. Taradevi Siddhartha (born 1953) is a politician from Karnataka, India. She was a member of the 8th and 10th Lok Sabha beside the Rajya Sabha and the Karnataka Legislative Assembly.

== Early life ==
Daughter of Krishnappa Gouda of Mudigere, Taradevi was born on 26 December 1953. She holds a Bachelor of Arts degree.

== Career ==
In 1978, Taradevi was chosen the president of Mudigere Taluka Development Board and went on to become the chief of the town's municipal council. When Indira Gandhi stood for election from Chikmagalur, she stayed at Taradevi's house. Later, she served as a member of the Karnataka Legislative Assembly till 1984, when the Indian National Congress (INC) fielded her in Chikmagalur during the 1984 Indian general election. After completing her first term in the 8th Lok Sabha, she was elected to the Rajya Sabha in 1990. The following year, Taradevi contested in the 1991 Indian general election and became a minister for State, Health & Family Welfare in the newly formed cabinet of P. V. Narasimha Rao.

Taradevi has also held important positions within the INC administration, including that of joint secretary of the All India Congress Committee. For a brief period, she was a member of the Bharatiya Janata Party.

== Personal life ==
Taradevi married Siddhartha Reddy, an important member of the INC in Karnataka.
