= Turuvanur =

- village
- Location in Karnataka, India
- Coordinates: 14.22°N 76.40°E
- Country: India
- State: Karnataka
- District: Chitradurga
- Talukas: Chitradurga
- Elevation: 3,597 m (11,801 ft)

Population (2001)
  - Total: 13,809

Languages
  - Official: Kannada
- Time zone: UTC+5:30 (IST)

Turuvanur is a village in Chitradurga taluk in the south Indian state of Karnataka.

== Demographics ==
As of the 2001 India census, Turuvanur had a population of 13,809 with 7,073 males and 6,736 females.

== Geography ==
Turuvanur is a Village Panchayat. It is 22 km from the Talluk and District headquarter Chitradurga. This Panchayat is under the Legislative Assembly of Challakere.

== History ==
Sthala Purana says, Turuvanur was ruled by an empire of Nayakas of Chitradurga. The people were in the business of cattle (gollas). They used to come daily to this place for cattle food. The people constructed a temple called "Turuvappa Devaru".

Turuvanuru is known for Karnataka's former chief minister Sri. S. Nijalingappa because of the great "Eachalu Marada Chaluvali". He resigned to become a freedom fighter. Many people were arrested as part of the struggle. The Government of Karnataka created a memorial called "Gandhi Kote".

== Etymology ==
The word "turuva" means "Horse".

== Culture ==
One of the most famous Thipperudra Swamy fairs in Karnataka is held in Nayakana Hatti, 14 km distance from Turuvanuru.

Nearby peoples include Lingayats, Kunchitagas, Devangas, Nayakas, Gollas (Yadavs), Kurubas, Madiga, Bhovi, Uppara, Kunchitigas and Reddy.

== Economy ==
Most inhabitants depend on agriculture.The agricultural land is of black cotton soil suitable for cultivation of cotton, jawar, tordal. Rain dependent agriculture.Inhabitants like Kuruba community economically very sound by rearing Sheep's goats and production of hand made sheep wool handloom products from sheepwool

== See also ==
- Chitradurga
- Districts of Karnataka
