= J. H. Patel =

Indian politician

9th Chief Minister of Karnataka
- In office 31 May 1996 – 7 October 1999
- Preceded by: H. D. Deve Gowda
- Succeeded by: S. M. Krishna

2nd Deputy Chief Minister of Karnataka
- In office 11 December 1994 – 31 May 1996
- Chief Minister: H. D. Deve Gowda
- Preceded by: S. M. Krishna
- Succeeded by: Siddaramaiah
- Constituency: Channagiri

Member of Parliament, Lok Sabha
- In office 1967–1971
- Preceded by: S. V. Krishnamoorthy Rao
- Succeeded by: T. V. Chandrashekarappa
- Constituency: Shimoga

Personal details
- Born: 1 October 1930 Kariganur, Kingdom of Mysore, British India
- Died: 12 December 2000 (aged 70) Bangalore, Karnataka, India
- Party: Janata Dal
- Other political affiliations: Janata Dal (United), Samyukta Socialist Party
- Spouse: Sarvamangala Patil

Jayadevappa Halappa Patel (Kannada: ಜಯದೇವಪ್ಪ ಹಾಲಪ್ಪ ಪಟೇಲ್; 1 October 1930 – 12 December 2000) was the 9th Chief Minister of the Indian state of Karnataka from 31 May 1996 to 7 October 1999.

== Biography ==
J.H. Patel was born on 1 October 1930 in Kariganur, now in Davanagere district, Karnataka, India. A Graduate in Law, he married Sarvamangala and had three sons Trishul, Satish and Mahima. J.H. Patel participated in the freedom struggle in 1942 and was imprisoned. A staunch socialist and an ardent follower of Ram Manohar Lohia, as a youth, he was inspired by Shantaveri Gopala Gowda. Patel's oratory skills left his mark on many. He remained a non-Congress leader throughout his life and was one of the pillars of Janata Dal in Karnataka. He belonged to Lingayat community.

== Political career ==
He was elected to Lok Sabha from Shimoga constituency in 1967, and was the first Kannadiga to table his debates in Kannada. Patel created history in Lok Sabha in 1967 when he spoke in his mother tongue Kannada in the house. The then Speaker of the Lok Sabha, Neelam Sanjiva Reddy allowed and encouraged Patel to go ahead with his speech. The Indian parliament had been active for 17 years and Patel became the first member to speak in a regional Indian language. He did so in vindication of the eighth schedule of the Indian constitution in which all recognised languages of India are listed. This prompted the Speaker of Lok Sabha, Sanjiva Reddy to decree in his famous ruling that henceforth any member of the Lok Sabha who is inclined to exercise his/her inherent right to speak in his/her mother tongue would do so without any hindrance.

Patel was imprisoned during the Emergency from 1975 to 1977. Later, he was elected to the Karnataka Legislative Assembly from Channagiri constituency in 1978. He was elected for the second term in 1983, and served as a cabinet minister in the Janata Party government headed by Ramakrishna Hegde. Patel also served as a minister in S R Bommai's government, and became the Deputy Chief Minister in 1994 when the Janata Dal returned to power under the leadership of H. D. Deve Gowda. He succeeded Gowda in 1996 following the latter's elevation to the post of Prime minister. He was the first Chief minister of Karnataka who was never a member of the Indian National Congress.

The most significant achievement of Patel's government was the formation of seven new districts in the State which was a long-delayed decision. His administration also gave impetus to Information Technology and attracted foreign investment. His government was also known for investing Rs. 4,800 crores on irrigation projects such as Ghataprabha, Malaprabha, modernisation of Visvesvaraya Canal, work on Varuna Canal and near completion of the Alamatti Dam across the Krishna River.

Patel witnessed turbulent days as Chief minister following the expulsion of his mentor Ramakrishna Hegde from the party and the split in the Janata Dal into the Janata Dal (United) in which he remained; and the Janata Dal (Secular), led by Deve Gowda. He managed internal dissidence from fellow party members throughout his tenure. When party affairs took a turn for the worse, Patel recommended dissolution of the state assembly, six months ahead of the assembly polls in 1999. He merged his faction with Hegde's Lok Shakti and entered into an alliance with the Bharatiya Janata Party. In his last election, a young candidate Vadnal Rajanna defeated him and his party also suffered a massive defeat.

Patel died at the Manipal Hospital, Bangalore on 12 December 2000. He was buried with State honours at his native village, Kariganur. During his last days, Patel had been making efforts for the merger of the two Janata Dal factions.

He was known for his oratory and political skills.

Political offices
Preceded by S. M. Krishna	Deputy Chief Minister of Karnataka; 11 December 1994 – 31 May 1996	Succeeded by Siddaramaiah
Preceded by H. D. Deve Gowda	Chief Minister of Karnataka; 31 May 1996 – 7 October 1999	Succeeded by S. M. Krishna
