= 1951–52 Indian general election in Mysore =

11 (of 489) seats in the Lok Sabha
- Registered: 3,969,735
- Turnout: 2,061,438 (51.93%)
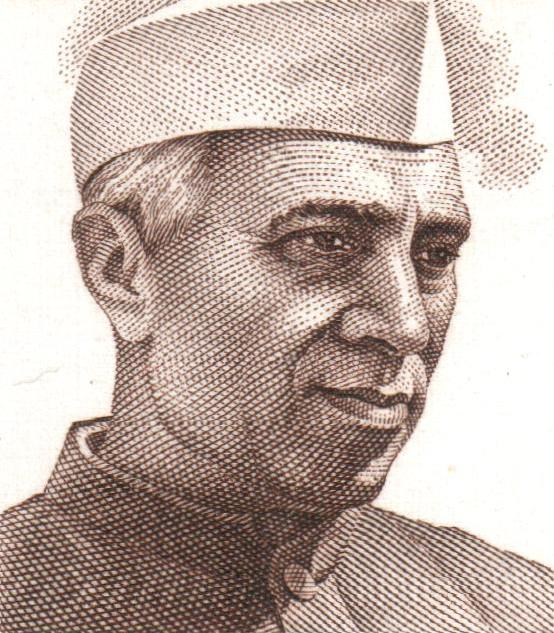

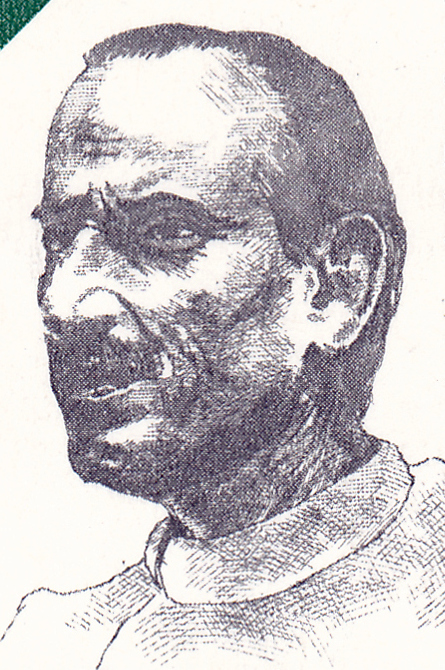
	First party	Second party
Leader	Jawaharlal Nehru	J. B. Kripalani
Party	INC	KMPP
Seats won	10	1
Popular vote	1,509,075	650,658
Percentage	53.43%	23.04%
Prime Minister before election
Jawaharlal Nehru
INC
Prime Minister after election
Jawaharlal Nehru
INC

The 1951–52 Indian general election was the first democratic national election held in India after Independence, and the polls in Mysore were held for 9 constituencies with 11 seats. The result was a victory for Indian National Congress winning 10 out of the 11 seats. Only one seat was won by the Kisan Mazdoor Praja Party.

== Results ==
Party	Votes	%	Seats
Indian National Congress	1,509,075	53.43	10
Kisan Mazdoor Praja Party	650,658	23.04	1
Socialist Party	181,430	6.42	0
Bharatiya Jana Sangh	117,470	4.16	0
Communist Party of India	73,322	2.60	0
Independents	292,472	10.36	0
Total	2,824,427	100.00	11
Source: ECI

=== By constituency ===
#	Constituency	Turnout	Winner	Party	Runner-up	Party
1	Kolar	717,848	M. V. Krishnappa	INC	J. T. Gopalakrishnan	IND
1	Kolar	717,848	Doddathimmiah	INC	V. M. Govindan	CPI
2	Tumkur	223,505	C. R. Basappa	INC	Kadri Shamanna	SP
3	Bangalore North	177,057	N. Keshavaiengar	INC	C. G. K. Reddy	SP
4	Bangalore South	155,948	T. Madiah Gowda	INC	K. Srinivasa Rao	KMPP
5	Mandya	212,015	M. K. Sivananjappa	INC	M. C. Lingegowda	KMPP
6	Mysore	712,318	N. Rachiah	INC	S. M. Siddiah	KMPP
6	Mysore	712,318	M. S. Gurupadaswamy	KMPP	H. C. Dasappa	INC
7	Hassan Chickmagalur	171,850	H. Siddananjappa	INC	S. Sivappa	SP
8	Shimoga	235,659	K. G. Wodeyar	INC	T. L. Kalliah	SP
9	Chitaldrug	218,227	S. Nijalingappa	INC	G. Marulappa	KMPP

== Bibliography ==
- Volume I, 1951 Indian general election, 1st Lok Sabha
