= Ramakrishna Hegde =

Indian politician (1926–2004)

Minister of Commerce
- In office 19 March 1998 – 13 October 1999
- Prime Minister: Atal Bihari Vajpayee
- Preceded by: Bolla Bulli Ramaiah
- Succeeded by: Murasoli Maran

Deputy Chairman of the Planning Commission
- In office 5 December 1989 – 6 July 1990
- Prime Minister: Vishwanath Pratap Singh
- Preceded by: Madhavsinh Solanki
- Succeeded by: Madhu Dandavate

3rd Chief Minister of Karnataka
- In office 10 January 1983 – 10 August 1988
- Preceded by: R. Gundu Rao
- Succeeded by: S. R. Bommai

Member of Parliament, Rajya Sabha
- In office 10 April 1996 – 9 April 2002
- Constituency: Karnataka
- In office 10 April 1978 – 23 May 1983
- Succeeded by: Sarojini Mahishi
- Constituency: Karnataka

Personal details
- Born: 29 August 1926 Siddapura, Kingdom of Mysore
- Died: 12 January 2004 (aged 77) Bangalore, Karnataka, India
- Party: JD(U)
- Other political affiliations: INC; JP; JD; Lok Shakti
- Spouse: Shakuntala Hegde

Ramakrishna Mahabaleshwar Hegde (29 August 1926 – 13 January 2004) was an Indian politician who served as the 3rd Chief Minister of Karnataka for three terms between 1983 and 1988. He was elected to the Karnataka Legislative Assembly in 1957, 1962, 1967, 1983, 1985 and 1989, to the Rajya Sabha for two terms, 1978–83 and 1996–2002. He also served as Minister of Commerce and Industry in the Union government (1998–1999).

== Early life ==
Hegde was born at Siddapura in Uttara Kannada district into a Havyaka Brahmin family, he was son of Mahabaleshwar Hegde and Smt. Saraswati Amma Hegde, who hailed from Sirimane village near Sringeri. Hegde completed a part of his studies at the Kashi Vidyapeeth in Varanasi and later obtained a degree in law from Lucknow university. A lawyer by profession, he participated in the Quit India Movement of 1942 and was an active member of the Congress Party.

== Political career ==
Hegde became the president of the Uttara Kannada District Congress Committee from 1954 to 1957 and rose to become the general secretary of the Mysore Pradesh Congress Committee in 1958, a post he held until 1962. Much of his early administrative experience was built up during the governments of S. Nijalingappa (1956–58 and 1962–68) and Veerendra Patil (1968–71). He was first elected to the Karnataka Legislative Assembly in 1957 and appointed a deputy minister. He was later promoted to cabinet-minister rank, holding diverse portfolios such as Youth Welfare and Sports, Cooperation, Industries, Planning, Panchayat Raj, Development, Information and Publicity, Excise and Finance between 1962 and 1971.

During the split in the Congress in 1969, Hegde followed in the footsteps of his mentor Nijalingappa and joined the Congress (O), the faction that was opposed to Prime Minister Indira Gandhi. He was Leader of the Opposition in the Karnataka Legislative Council for a few years until 1974. The 1975 Emergency crackdown on opposition leaders saw his arrest along with several other state and national level leaders. When the emergency was lifted, he joined the Janata Party and became the first general secretary of its Karnataka state unit. He was a member of the Rajya Sabha during 1978–83.

== Chief Minister of Karnataka ==
When the Janata Party came to power by emerging as the single largest party in the 1983 State elections, he emerged as a consensus Brahmin candidate between the powerful Lingayat and Vokkaliga lobbies. In the process, he became the first non-Congress chief minister of Karnataka. He cobbled up a two-thirds majority for his government by an arrangement of outside support from other parties. His government secured the outside support of the Bharatiya Janata Party (BJP), Left parties and 16 Independents.

Following the poor performance of the Janata Party in the 1984 elections to the 8th Lok Sabha (it won only 4 out of the 28 seats from Karnataka), Hegde resigned on the grounds that his party had lost its popular mandate and sought a fresh mandate for his government. In the 1985 elections, the Janata Party came to power on its own with a comfortable majority. As Chief Minister between 1983 and 1985 and again between 1985 and 1988, he became an active votary of State rights within a federal set-up, but one who made no concession to regional or linguistic chauvinism. Secondly, he took innovative initiatives in expanding the federal principle within the State, primarily in the area of devolving power to local bodies and in trying to enforce accountability. During his term Karnataka pioneered legislation on Panchayat Raj that devolved a substantial degree of financial and administrative powers to a three-tiered structure of local government. He supported the tireless work of his Minister for Rural Development and Panchayat Raj, Abdul Nazir Sab, in promoting devolution of power to the gram panchayats in the state, and the Karnataka implementation became a role model for the rest of India. In 1984 he introduced legislation to deal with official and administrative corruption through the institution of the Lokayukta. Also, he started the 'Kannada watchdog panel' to oversee the implementation of Kannada in administration. He has the rare distinction of presenting thirteen finance budgets in the state assembly.

As Chief Minister, Hegde enjoyed immense personal popularity and was acknowledged as an efficient administrator. However, as days passed by, his rule was mired with several scams involving alleged corruption on the part of his own family. His son was accused of taking money for a medical seat. There were allegations made by the Congress (I) against him in a case involving the transfer of shares by the NGEF company.

He resigned on 13 February 1986 when the Karnataka High Court censured his government for the way it handled arrack bottling contracts, however, withdrew his resignation after three days on 16 February.

He resigned and quit office in 1988 after allegations of phone tapping of prominent politicians and businessmen in the State. Hegde then filed a case against Subramanian Swamy in 1989 and 1990 after Swamy accused him of tapping. Soon after, he quit the Janata Party and joined the Janata Dal.

He contested Lok Sabha elections from Bagalkot in 1991 and was defeated by Congress candidate Siddu Nyamagouda.

He was also the Deputy Chairman of the Planning Commission of India during the tenure of V. P. Singh. He was expelled from Janata Dal by its president Lalu Prasad Yadav, as per the instructions of Prime Minister H. D. Deve Gowda in 1996. Following his expulsion, Hegde formed the "Rashtreeya Nava nirmana vedike" a social organization and then his political party Lok Shakti. He allied with the Bharatiya Janata Party and the alliance won a majority of the Lok Sabha seats from Karnataka in the 1998 General Elections. He became the Commerce minister in the BJP led NDA government in 1998. After the Janata Dal split of 1999, the faction led by his protégé, Chief Minister J. H. Patel, and the Lok Shakti merged to form the Janata Dal (United) and allied with the BJP. However, the alliance suffered a setback in the 1999 General Elections owing to the anti-incumbency against the Patel Government and the Congress party emerged victorious in Karnataka.

== Electoral Results ==
=== Rajya Sabha ===
Position	Party	Constituency	From	To	Tenure
Member of Parliament, Lok Sabha (1st Term)	JP	Karnataka	10 April 1978	23 May 1983	5 years, 43 days
Member of Parliament, Lok Sabha (2nd Term)	LS	Karnataka	10 April 1996	9 April 2002	5 years, 364 days

== Personal life ==
Hegde was married at a very young age to Shakuntala Amma, in a match arranged by their families in the usual Indian way. The marriage lasted throughout their lives. They had three children, a son named Bharath appa and two daughters named Mamata and Samata. Shakuntala, a devoted wife and mother, chose to stay away from public life. She continues to reside in Bangalore after Hegde's death, and had to suffer the pain of witnessing the early death of her only son, Bharath, who died of liver cancer in February 2013. Shakuntala Amma Hegde is now of very advanced age and is being cared for by her two daughters.

Hegde was also the romantic partner of a renowned Indian classical dancer Pratibha Prahlad who was junior to him by 36 years, from the 1980s until his death in 2004. He is also the biological father of her twin sons, Chirantan and Chirayu, who were born in 1998.

== Later life ==
Despite the weakening of his political stock, Hegde continued to play the role of elder statesman in the fractious Janata Parivar. He gradually moved away from active politics owing to poor health. He died in Bangalore on 12 January 2004 after prolonged illness at the age of 77. His death caused an outpouring of grief in Karnataka.

A versatile personality, Hegde also acted in many dramas and films such as Marana Mrudanga, Prajashakti. He was the political mentor of a large number of politicians such as Jeevaraj Alva, Abdul Samad Siddiqui, M. P. Prakash, P. G. R. Sindhia, R. V. Deshpande, and groomed many younger politicians. In the latter part of his life he became depressed and trusted only few friends like Alva, Siddiqui and advocate Manas Ranjan, along with his partner, Prathibha Prahlad, who he confided in and spent his free time with. His wife, Shakuntala, unsuccessfully contested Rajya Sabha as a BJP candidate in 2004.

Political offices
Preceded by Bolla Bulli Ramaiah	Minister of Commerce; 19 March 1998–13 October 1999	Succeeded by Murasoli Maran
Preceded by Madhavsinh Solanki	Deputy Chairman of the Planning Commission; 5 December 1989–6 July 1990	Succeeded by Madhu Dandavate
Preceded by R. Gundu Rao	Chief Minister of Karnataka; 10 January 1983 – 10 August 1988	Succeeded by S. R. Bommai
