= D. C. Srikantappa =

Indian politician

MP
- In office 1998–2008
- Constituency: Chikmagalur

Personal details
- Born: 6 March 1929 Birur, Karnataka
- Died: 4 August 2008 (aged 79) Birur
- Party: BJP
- Spouse: Lalithamma
- Children: 2 sons and 1 daughter
- As of 23 September, 2006

D. C. Srikantappa (born 6 March 1929) was a member of the 14th Lok Sabha of India. He represented the Chikmagalur constituency of Karnataka and was a member of the Bharatiya Janata Party (BJP) political party.
