= Ayanur Manjunath =

Indian politician

Member of Karnataka Legislative Council
- Incumbent
- Assumed office 22 June 2018
- Preceded by: D. H. Shankaramurthy
- Constituency: Karnataka South West Graduates

Member of Parliament, Rajya Sabha
- In office 1 July 2010 – 30 June 2016
- Constituency: Karnataka

Member of Parliament, Lok Sabha
- In office 10 March 1998 – 26 April 1999
- Preceded by: S. Bangarappa
- Succeeded by: S. Bangarappa
- Constituency: Shimoga

Member of Karnataka Legislative Assembly
- In office 1994–1998
- Preceded by: B. Swami Rao
- Succeeded by: G. D. Narayanappa
- Constituency: Hosanagar

Personal details
- Born: 14 November 1955 (age 70) Ayanur
- Party: Indian National Congress(2023 August-present)
- Other political affiliations: Janata Dal (Secular) (2023), Bharatiya Janata Party (until 2023)
- Spouse: Manjula Manjunath (m. 1987)
- Children: 2
- Education: B. A., L. L. B.

Ayanur Manjunatha (born 14 November 1955) is an Indian politician. He is a member of Rajya Sabha from Karnataka State for the term Jul 2010- July 2016. He was a member of Janata Dal (Secular).

He was member of 12th Lok Sabha from Shimoga and defeated Sarekoppa Bangarappa of Congress. Earlier during 1994-98 he was Member of Karnataka Legislative Assembly. He had studied B.A., LL.B. at Sahyadri College at Shivamogga in Karnataka.

Ayanur Manjunath resigned from MLC and also from primary membership of the Bharatiya Janata Party on 19 April 2023.

He later joined JDS in April 2023 and contested the Karnataka Legislative Assembly election from Shimoga district. However, he lost the election along with its deposit.

He then joined the Indian National Congress party in August 2023 and was fielded as an MLC candidate for the South-West Graduate Constituency from the party in March 2024. However, he again lost the election against BJP candidate after the results were announced in June 2024.
