= Chikmagalur Lok Sabha constituency =

Former constituency of the Indian parliament in Karnataka

Coordinates: 13.3°N 75.8°E

Chikmagalur
- Former Lok Sabha constituency

Constituency details
- Country: India
- Region: South India
- State: Karnataka
- Established: 1967
- Abolished: 2009
- Reservation: None

Chikkamagaluru Lok Sabha Constituency was a former Lok Sabha (parliamentary) constituency in Karnataka state in southern India. With the implementation of the delimitation of parliamentary constituencies in 2008, it ceased to exist.

== Assembly segments ==
Chikkamagaluru Lok Sabha Constituency comprised the following eight Legislative Assembly segments:

1. Sringeri
2. Mudigere
3. Chikkamagaluru
4. Kadur
5. Birur
6. Tarikere
7. Belthangady
8. Karkala

== Members of Parliament ==
=== As Hassan Chickmagalur (1952-1957) ===
Year	Member	Party
1952	H.Siddananjappa	Indian National Congress

=== As Chikmagalur (1967-2009) ===
Year	Member	Party
1957 to 1967 : See Hassan
1967	M.Huchegowda	Praja Socialist Party
1971	D. B. Chandre Gowda	Indian National Congress
1977	D. B. Chandre Gowda	Indian National Congress
1978^	Indira Gandhi	Indian National Congress
1980	D. M. Puttegowda	Indian National Congress (I)
1984	D. K. Taradevi	Indian National Congress
1989	D. M. Puttegowda	Indian National Congress
1991	D. K. Taradevi	Indian National Congress
1996	B. L. Shankar	Janata Dal
1998	D. C. Srikantappa	Bharatiya Janata Party
1999	D. C. Srikantappa	Bharatiya Janata Party
2004	D. C. Srikantappa	Bharatiya Janata Party
2008 onwards : See Udupi-Chikamagalur

^By Poll

== See also ==
- Hassan Chickmagalur Lok Sabha constituency (1952 Election)
- Chikmagalur district
- List of former constituencies of the Lok Sabha
- Udupi Chikmagalur Lok Sabha constituency (2009 onwards)
