= Lok Shakti =

Indian political party (1997–2003)

- Leader: Ramakrishna Hegde
- Founder: Ramakrishna Hegde
- Founded: 1997
- Dissolved: 2003
- Split from: Janata Dal
- Merged into: Janata Dal (United)
- ECI status: dissolved party
- Alliance: National Democratic Alliance (1998-2003)

Election symbol
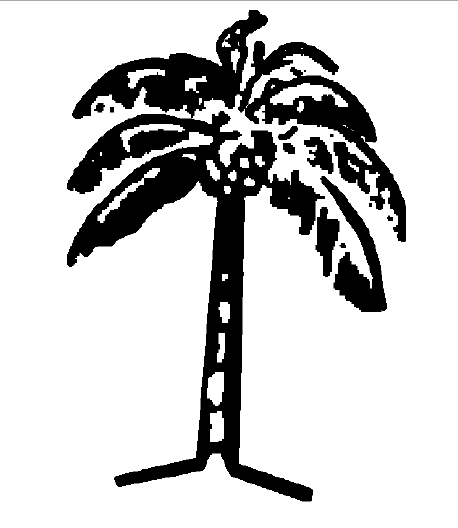

Lok Shakti (lit. People's Power) was a political party in India. Lok Shakti was one of several parties that were formed when the Janata Dal crumbled in the mid-1990s. LS was formed in February 1997 after Ramakrishna Hegde was expelled from Janata Dal. Lok Shakti emerged as a major party in Karnataka. It was a founding member of the National Democratic Alliance (NDA). It eventually merged with Janata Dal (United).

== History ==
Before the 1999 general election, the faction led by then Chief Minister of Karnataka J. H. Patel lent support to the NDA, leading to the split in the Janata Dal. This caused the formation of Janata Dal (Secular) under H. D. Deve Gowda, who wanted to remain equidistant from both national parties, and Janata Dal (United) under Sharad Yadav.

Janata Dal (United) was formed with the merger of the Sharad Yadav faction of the Janata Dal, the Lok Shakti and the Samata Party. On 30 October 2003, the Samata Party led by George Fernandes and Nitish Kumar merged with the Janata Dal. The merged entity was called Janata Dal (United) with the arrow symbol of Janata Dal (United) and the green and white flag of the Samata Party. But Election Commission of India refused the merger of Samata Party. Brahmanand Mandal became the president, but he was suffering from Alzheimer's disease and not physically well so Uday Mandal became President and took charge of the Samata Party. The uniting force is believed to be the components' common opposition to Rashtriya Janata Dal in Bihar especially after the Rashtriya Janata Dal welcomed Samata Party rebels like Raghunath Jha into the party.

== Party Presidents ==
Snigdha Suwalka

== General Secretary ==
Abdul Samad Siddiqui

== State Units ==
=== Karnataka ===
==== Presidents ====
Jeevaraj Alva (1999)
