= Jeevaraj Alva =

Indian politician (1947–2001)

Minister of State for Kannada and Culture, Government of Karnataka
- In office 8 March 1985 – 13 August 1988

Member of the Karnataka Legislative Assembly
- In office 1994–1996
- Preceded by: Perikal Mallappa
- Succeeded by: P. S. Prakash
- Constituency: Chickpet
- In office 1989–1994
- Preceded by: M. Raghupathy
- Succeeded by: Anant Nag
- Constituency: Malleshwaram
- In office 1978–1989
- Preceded by: Constituency established
- Succeeded by: S. M. Yahya
- Constituency: Jayamahal

Personal details
- Born: 18 April 1947 Mangalore, Madras Presidency, British India
- Died: 12 February 2001 (aged 53) Bangalore, India
- Party: Janata Dal (United)
- Other political affiliations: Lok Shakti; Janata Dal; Bharatiya Janata Party; Karnataka Kranti Ranga; Janata Party
- Spouse: Nandini Seth
- Children: 2
- Parent: K. Nagappa Alva (father)
- Occupation: Politician

Jeevaraj Alva (18 April 1947 – 12 February 2001) was an Indian politician from the State of Karnataka. He held multiple portfolios such as Kannada and culture, youth affairs and sports, higher education and information in the government of Karnataka. Alva was serving as vice-president of the Janata Dal (United) when he died in 2001, aged 53.

== Early life ==
Alva was born into a middle-class family which hailed from the coastal Canara region of Karnataka and belonged to the Tulu-speaking Bunt community. He was born on 18 April 1947 in Mangalore, a part of the erstwhile Madras Presidency of British India. His father, K. Nagappa Alva, was also a politician and he once headed the state unit of the Indian National Congress. Alva was a trained physician from St. John's Medical College, Bangalore. While still in college, in 1976, he was "provoked into joining politics" by Jayaprakash Narayan, led by former Chief Minister of Mysore (now Karnataka), D. Devaraj Urs, into the JP movement.

== Career ==
Hegde was a colleague of Jeevaraj Alva's father, K. Nagappa Alva, when the two were a part of the Second Nijalingappa ministry. Jeevaraj then went on to become a close confidante of Hegde, who called him a sanghathana chatura (able organiser), and served as minister when in his cabinet. Alva was first elected to the Karnataka Legislative Assembly in 1978, when he contested Jayamahal. He contested with a Janata Party ticket and was elected as the youngest member of the assembly. He was re-elected twice from the same constituency, and subsequently from Malleshwaram and Chickpet in Bangalore. When the Janata Party and Janata Dal formed governments in the 1980s and 1990s in the State, he held portfolios higher education, information, Kannada and culture. He is credited with playing the trouble-shooter and mediating during a feud between Hegde and Janata Party leader H. D. Deve Gowda. Alva was reported to have played a role in Gowda becoming the Chief Minister of Karnataka in 1994. In 1980, he co-founded the Karnataka Kranti Ranga, intended to campaign against Indira Gandhi, who Devaraj Urs had fallen out with. Alva would subsequently be a backroom operator, helping engineer Hegde's ascent to the chief ministership of Karnataka in 1983.

Between 1988 and 1990, Alva served as secretary-general of Janata Party, of its Karnataka State unit. He joined the Bharatiya Janata Party (BJP) just before 1994 Karnataka Legislative Assembly election. He stayed with the party for a period of 18 months, before quitting to rejoin the Janata Dal. Alva unsuccessfully contested the 1996 and 1998 elections to the Lok Sabha from Bangalore North. He would then join the Lok Shakti in 1999 and serve as its Karnataka State unit president. His attempt to re-enter the Karnataka Legislative Assembly that year, from Jayamahal, failed.

== Personal life ==
Alva was married to a classical dancer, Nandini Seth. Seth eloped with him when she was 14 and he was 30, in the late-1970s. Hailing from Allahabad, her family had settled in Bangalore in the mid-1960s. Alva met her while she was a student in the city in the mid-1970s. They have two children together: son Aditya, who is a BJP leader in Bangalore, and daughter, Priyanka. Priyanka is married to actor Vivek Oberoi. Alva and his wife lived separately three years before Alva's death in 2001.

In June 2000, Alva was admitted to the Manipal Hospital in Bangalore to be treated for meningitis. Despite recovery, his health worsened after a trip to the US in December. In February 2001, he was again admitted after he contracted pneumonia and jaundice. His health condition deteriorated and died on 12 February, aged 53. His final rites were performed with state honors the following day in the city.
