= Abdul Samad Siddiqui =

Indian politician (died 2022)

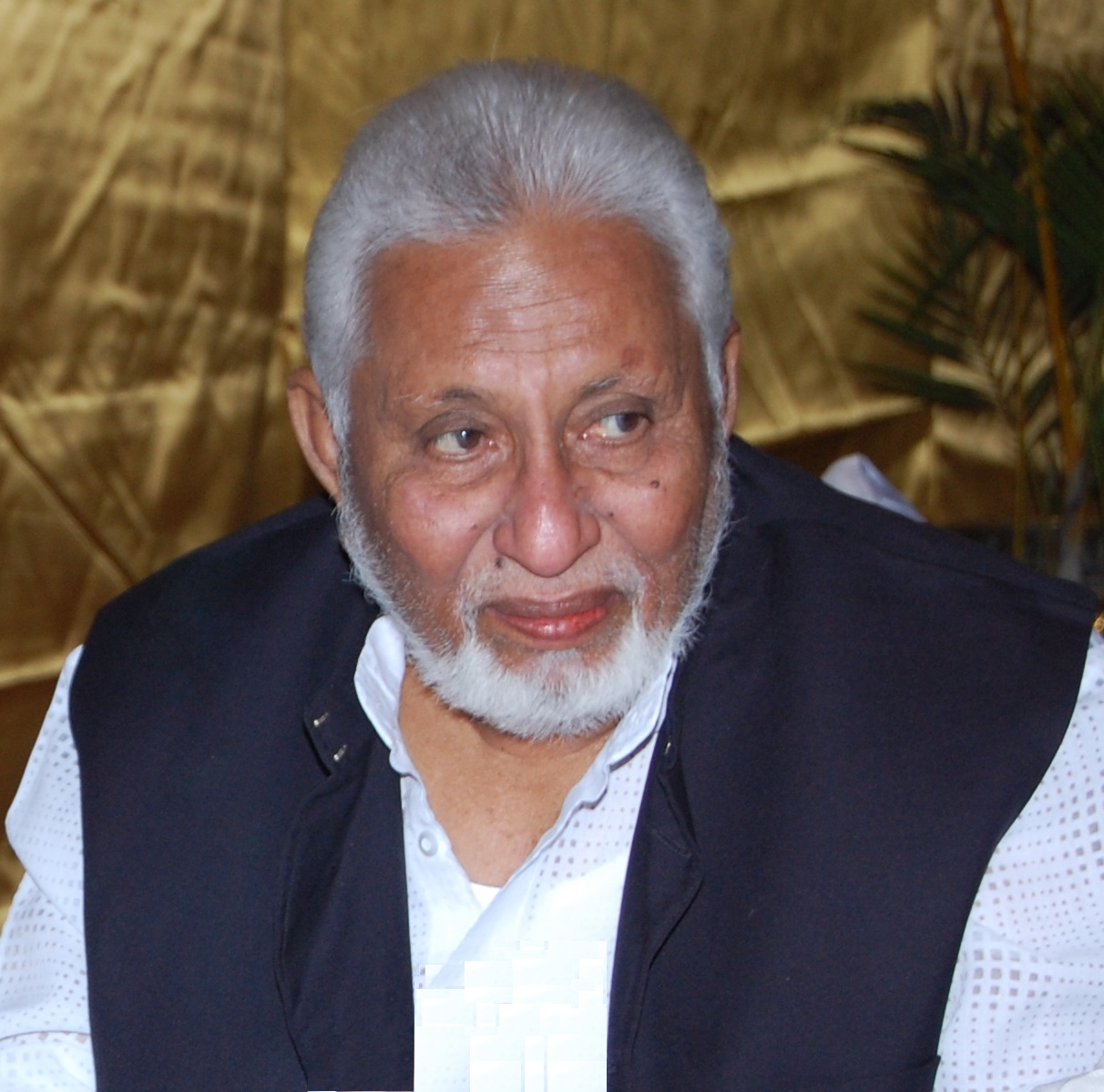

Member of Parliament (Rajya Sabha)
- In office 1988–1994
- Constituency: Raichur

Personal details
- Born: Raichur
- Died: 21 November 2022 Raichur, Karnataka, India
- Citizenship: Indian
- Party: Independent
- Children: 4
- Profession: Politician

Abdul Samad Siddiqui (died 21 November 2022) was an Indian educationist and politician who was a Member of Parliament (Rajya Sabha) from Hyderabad - Karnataka region from 1988 till 1994. He was the first Muslim leader from Hyderabad Karnataka region who represented in Rajya Sabha.

== Political Affiliation ==
Began with Janta Party Later became National General secretary of Janta Dal after Janta Dal split,he co-founded Lokshakti party and was the national General secretary Later joined BSP during a rally in Bangalore .

== Later years ==
He was renowned for his commitment to Education and Health care especially for the underprivileged and women. Siddiqui founded several Educational Institutions like New Education Society, Millat Education society, Hospitals like OPEC hospital Raichur, Waqf and Maternity hospital Raichur. He was actively involved in advocating for an IIT(Indian Institute of Technology).

== Notable contributions to Society ==
Milad-un-Nabi Holiday on his persistent demand, then Indian Prime Minister H.D. Deve Gowda declared Milad-un-Nabi a public holiday in the country significant recognition for Muslims.

== Karnataka Minority Development Corporation ==
•Siddiqui was a key force behind establishment of KMDC which was set to provide financial support, scholarships and livelihood assistance to religious minorities in Karnataka. His advocacy and pressure on the state government ensured minority welfare was institutionalized in the form of dedicated body which operates even today.

== Death ==
Siddiqui died following a prolonged illness on 21 November 2022.
