= Dardi =

Dardi may refer to:

- Dardi people, in India, Pakistan & Afghanistan
- Dardic languages, several of which have sometimes been known as "Dardi"
- Dardi school, a tradition within the Italian school of swordsmanship
- Jagjit Singh Dardi (born 1949), journalist and an educationist from the Indian State of Punjab
- Teja Singh Dardi (died 1998), Indian politician

== See also ==
- Dardis (disambiguation)
