= Sarabjeet Singh Khalsa =

Indian politician (born 1979)

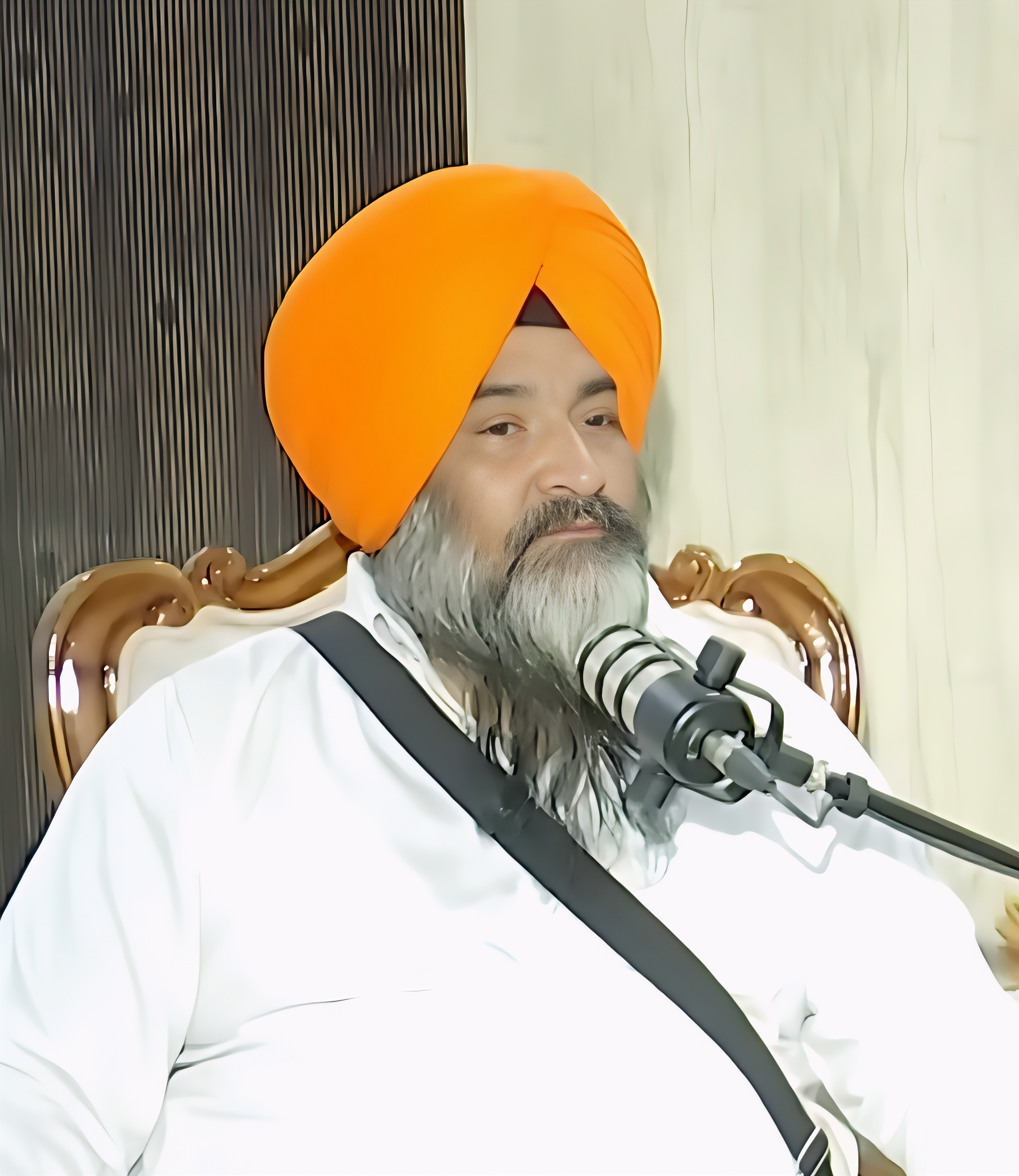

Member of Parliament, Lok Sabha
- Incumbent
- Assumed office 4 June 2024
- Preceded by: Muhammad Sadiq
- Constituency: Faridkot

Personal details
- Born: 1 November 1979 (age 46)
- Party: Akali Dal (Waris Punjab De)
- Spouse: Sandeep Kaur Khalsa
- Children: 2
- Parents: Beant Singh (father); Bimal Kaur Khalsa (mother)
- Relatives: Baba Sucha Singh (grandfather)

Sarabjeet Singh Khalsa (born 1 November 1979) is an Indian politician from Punjab of Akali Dal Waris Punjab De. He is serving as a Member of Parliament in the Lok Sabha representing the constituency of Faridkot since 2024.

== Personal life ==
Khalsa is the son of Beant Singh, the former bodyguard and one of the assassins of former Indian Prime Minister Indira Gandhi, and Bimal Kaur Khalsa, a former Lok Sabha MP who represented the Ropar constituency.

His grandfather, Baba Sucha Singh was also a Member of Parliament in the Lok Sabha, representing Bathinda constituency.

== Political career ==
Khalsa ran for the Lok Sabha election in 2004 from the Bathinda constituency and received 113,490 votes. He then competed in the Punjab Assembly election in 2007 from Bhadaur in Barnala district, garnering only 15,702 votes. In 2009 and 2014, he again ran unsuccessfully for the Lok Sabha from the Bathinda and Fatehgarh Sahib constituencies, respectively.

Khalsa was elected as a Member of Parliament from Faridkot as an independent candidate in 2024 general election. He achieved success with 2,98,062 votes at 29.38% of the total count, defeating Punjabi actor Karamjit Anmol of the Aam Aadmi Party.

2004 Indian general elections: Bathinda
Party	Candidate	Votes	%	±%
SAD	Paramjit Kaur Gulshan	323,394	42.37	▲1.46
CPI	Kaushalya Chaman Bhaura	260,752	34.17	▼16.17
SAD(A)	Sarabjeet Singh Khalsa	113,490	14.87	New entry
BSP	Gurnam Singh	31,727	1.91	New entry
IND	Jasvir Singh	8,733	0.80	New entry
Margin of victory		62,642	8.21	
Turnout		763,195		
SAD gain from CPI		Swing	{{{swing}}}	

2014 Indian general election: Fatehgarh Sahib
Party	Candidate	Votes	%	±%
AAP	Harinder Singh Khalsa	367,237	35.62	New
INC	Sadhu Singh	313,149	30.37	▼16.59
SAD	Kulwant Singh	312,815	30.34	▼12.52
BSP	Sarabjeet Singh Khalsa	12,683	1.23	▼6.58
NOTA	None of the Above	4,005	0.38	N/A
Majority		54,088	5.25	▲1.16
Turnout		1,031,030	73.81	▲4.40
AAP gain from INC		Swing	▲26.11	

2024 Indian general election: Faridkot
Party	Candidate	Votes	%	±%
IND	Sarabjeet Singh Khalsa	298,062	29.38	New
AAP	Karamjit Anmol	228,009	22.48	▲10.65
INC	Amarjit Kaur Sahoke	160,357	15.81	▼27.17
SAD	Rajwinder Singh	138,251	13.63	▼20.81
BJP	Hans Raj Hans	123,533	12.18	New
NOTA	None of the Above	4,143	0.41	▼1.56
Majority		70,053	6.91	▼1.63
Turnout		1,014,455	63.64	▲0.39
Independent gain from INC		Swing		
