= Kaum De Heere =

- Theatrical release poster
- Directed by: Ravinder Ravi
- Story by: Ravinder Ravi
- Produced by: Satish Katyal
- Starring: Raj Kakra; Sukhdeep Sukh
- Cinematography: Shivtar Shiv
- Edited by: Naresh S Garg
- Music by: Beat Minister
- Production company: Sai Cine Productions
- Release date: 22 August 2014
- Running time: 121 minutes
- Country: India
- Language: Punjabi

Kaum De Heere ('Gems of the Community' or 'Diamonds of the Community') is a 2014 Indian Punjabi-language biographical film by Ravinder Ravi based on the lives of Satwant Singh, Beant Singh and Kehar Singh, who assassinated Indira Gandhi, the Prime Minister of India in 1984.

On 29 August 2019, the Delhi High Court allowed the theatrical release of the film which had earlier been banned by the Central Board of Film Certification from public screening.

== Cast ==
- Raj Kakra as Beant Singh
- Sukhdeep Sukh as Satwant Singh
- Isha Sharma as Surinder Kaur
- Sardar Sohi as Kehar Singh
