= Kikar Singh =

Indian politician

Member of Parliament, Lok Sabha
- In office 1967–1971
- Preceded by: Dhanna Singh Gulshan
- Succeeded by: Bhan Singh Bhaura
- Constituency: Bathinda, Punjab

Personal details
- Born: 26 August 1939 Govind Garh, Ferozepur district, Punjab, British India
- Party: Akali Dal (Sant Group)

Kikar Singh (born 26 August 1939) is an Indian politician. He was a Member of Parliament, representing Bathinda, Punjab in the Lok Sabha the lower house of India's Parliament as a member of the Akali Dal (Sant Group).
