= Japan Airlines fleet =

Aircraft operated by Japan Airlines

Japan Airlines operates a fleet of wide-body and narrow-body aircraft manufactured by Airbus and Boeing. This does not include aircraft operated by JAL Group regional subsidiaries such as Hokkaido Air System, J-Air, Japan Air Commuter, Japan Transocean Air or Ryukyu Air Commuter.

== Current fleet ==
As of March 2026, Japan Airlines operates the following mainline aircraft:

Japan Airlines fleet
Aircraft	In service	Orders	Passengers					Notes
Aircraft	In service	Orders	F	J	W	Y	Total	Notes
Airbus A321neo	—	11	TBA					Deliveries to commence in 2028. Replacing domestic Boeing 767-300ER.
Airbus A350-900	18	—	12	94	—	263	369	Order with 25 options. Domestic configuration.
Airbus A350-900	18	—	12	56	—	323	391	Order with 25 options. Domestic configuration.
Airbus A350-900	—	20	TBA					International configuration. Deliveries to commence in 2027.
Airbus A350-1000	11	2	6	54	24	155	239	Replacing Boeing 777-300ER.
Boeing 737-800	62	—	—	12	—	132	144	International configuration.
Boeing 737-800	62	—	—	20	—	145	165	Domestic configuration. To be retired and replaced by Boeing 737 MAX 8.
Boeing 737 MAX 8	—	38	TBA					Replacing domestic Boeing 737-800. Deliveries to commence in 2026.
Boeing 767-300ER	27	—	—	24	—	175	199	International configuration.
Boeing 767-300ER	27	—	—	42	—	219	261	Domestic configuration. To be retired and replaced by Airbus A321neo in 2028.
Boeing 767-300ER	27	—	5	42	—	205	252	Domestic configuration. To be retired and replaced by Airbus A321neo in 2028.
Boeing 777-300ER	9	—	8	49	40	147	244	To be retired and replaced by Airbus A350-1000 in 2026.
Boeing 787-8	31	—	—	30	—	156	186	International configuration.
Boeing 787-8	31	—	—	30	—	176	206	International configuration.
Boeing 787-8	31	—	6	58	—	227	291	Domestic configuration.
Boeing 787-9	22	10	—	44	35	116	195	Deliveries through 2027. 10 to be transferred to Zipair Tokyo from 2027. Order with 10 options.
Boeing 787-9	22	10	—	52	35	116	203	Deliveries through 2027. 10 to be transferred to Zipair Tokyo from 2027. Order with 10 options.
Boeing 787-9	22	10	—	28	21	190	239	Deliveries through 2027. 10 to be transferred to Zipair Tokyo from 2027. Order with 10 options.
JAL Cargo fleet
Boeing 767-300BCF	3	—	Cargo					
Total	151	82						

=== Gallery ===
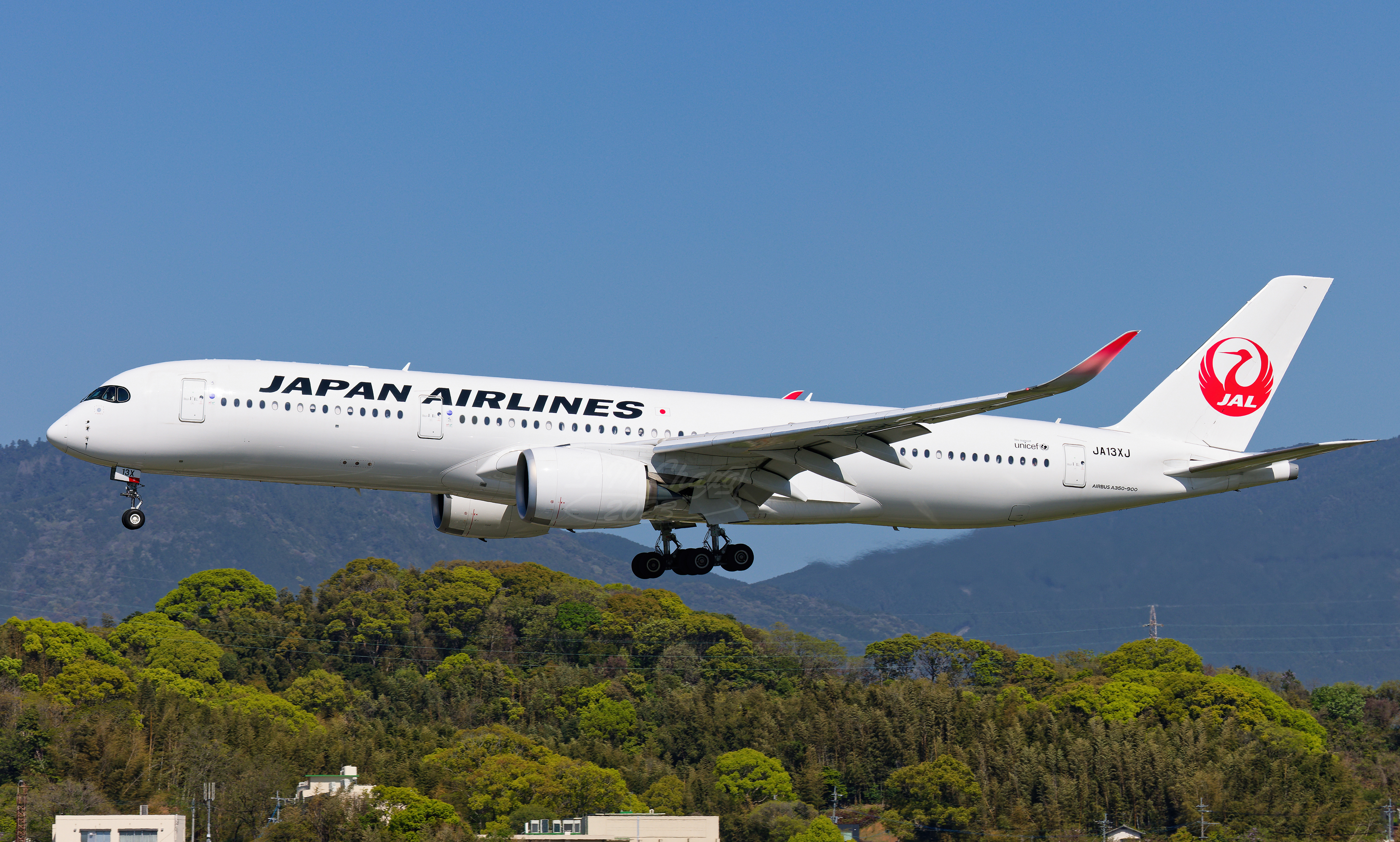
Airbus A350-900

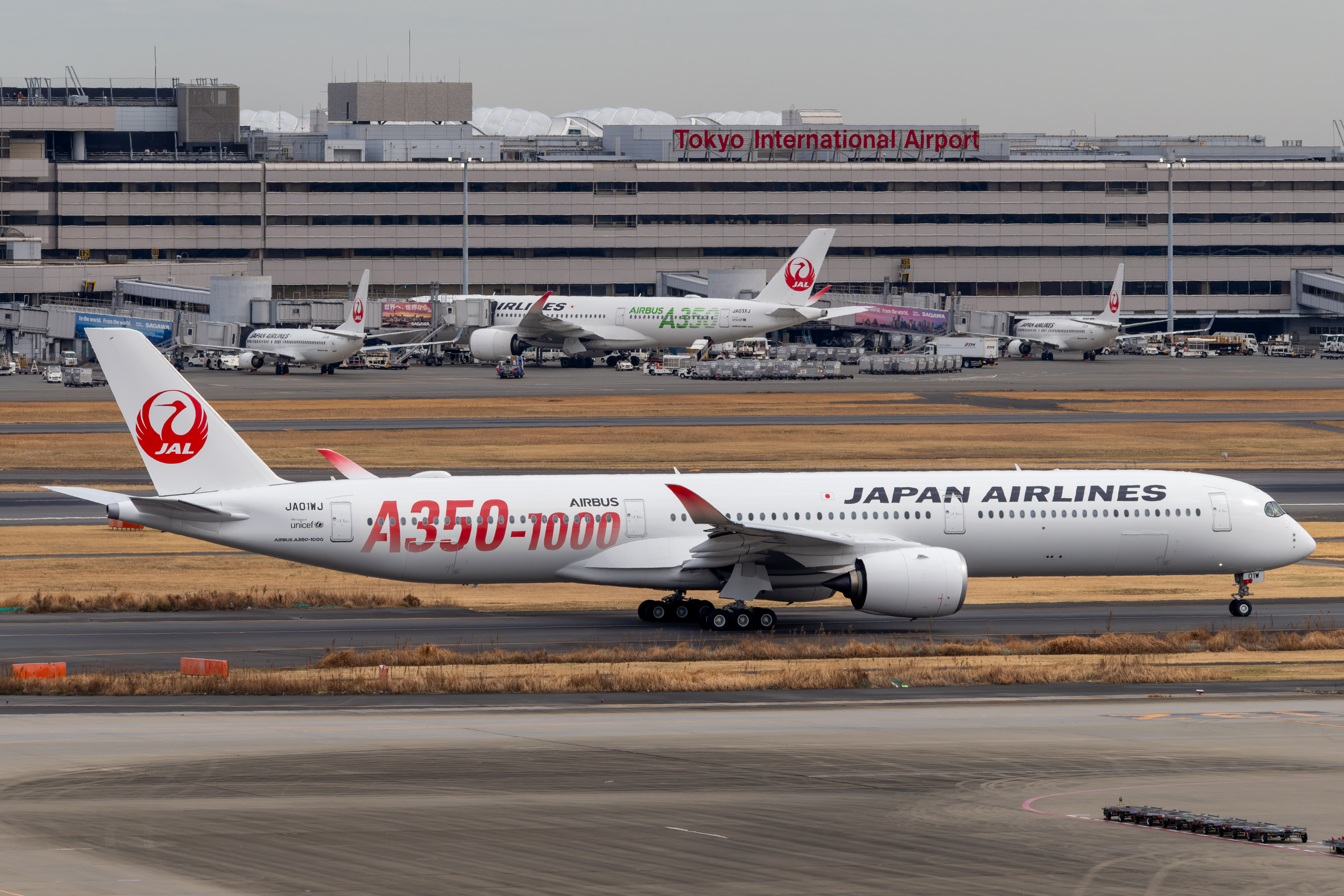
Airbus A350-1000

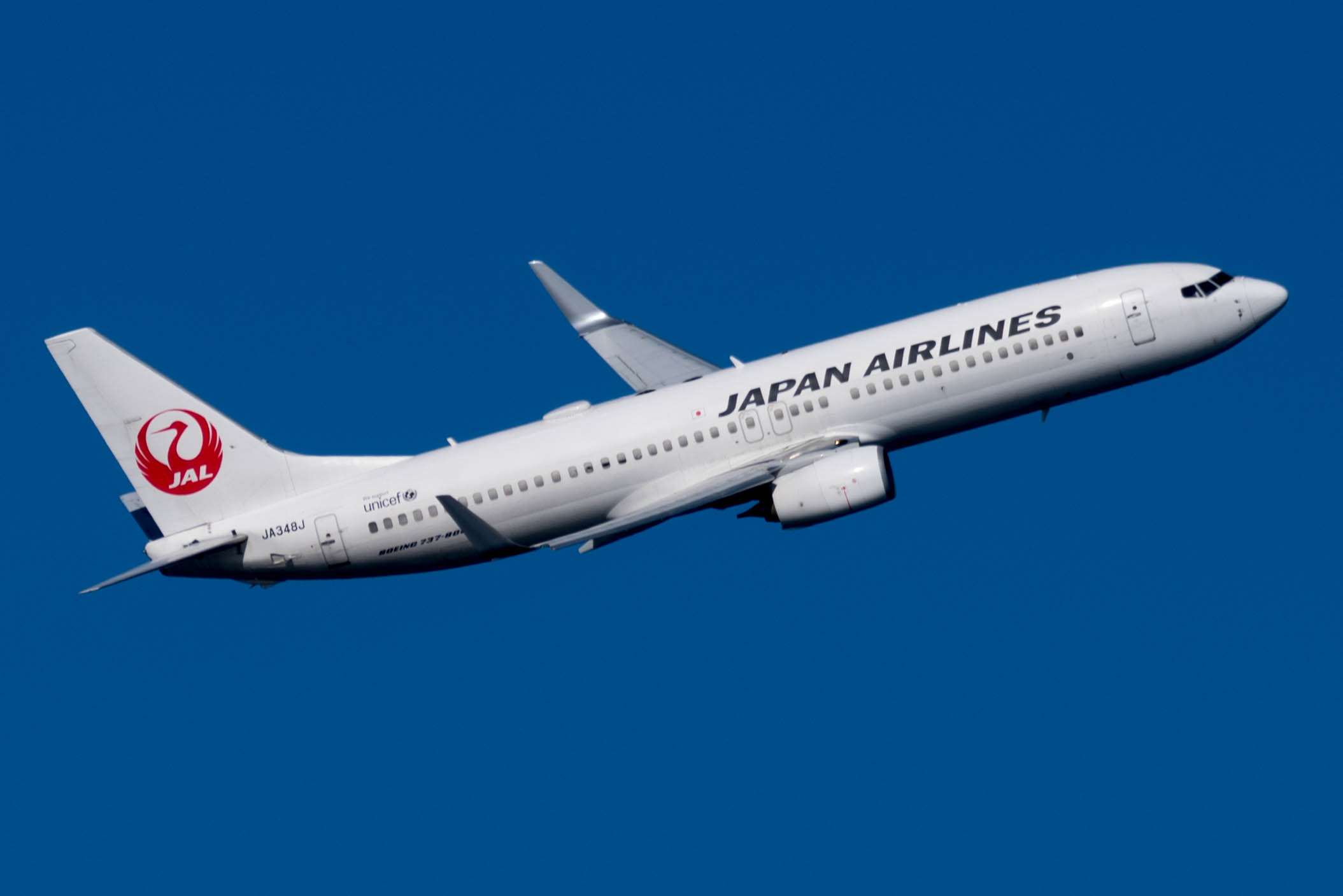
Boeing 737-800

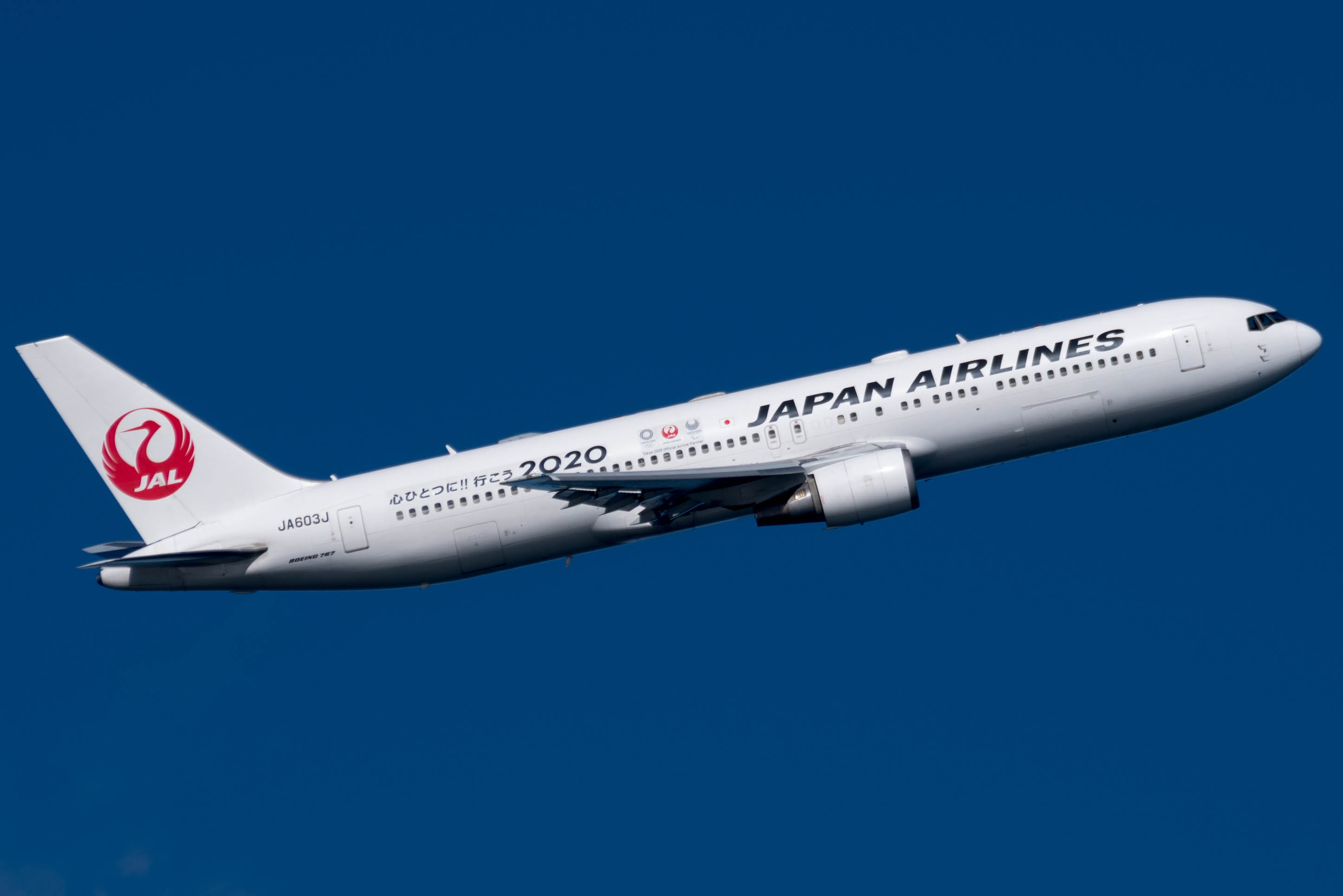
Boeing 767-300ER

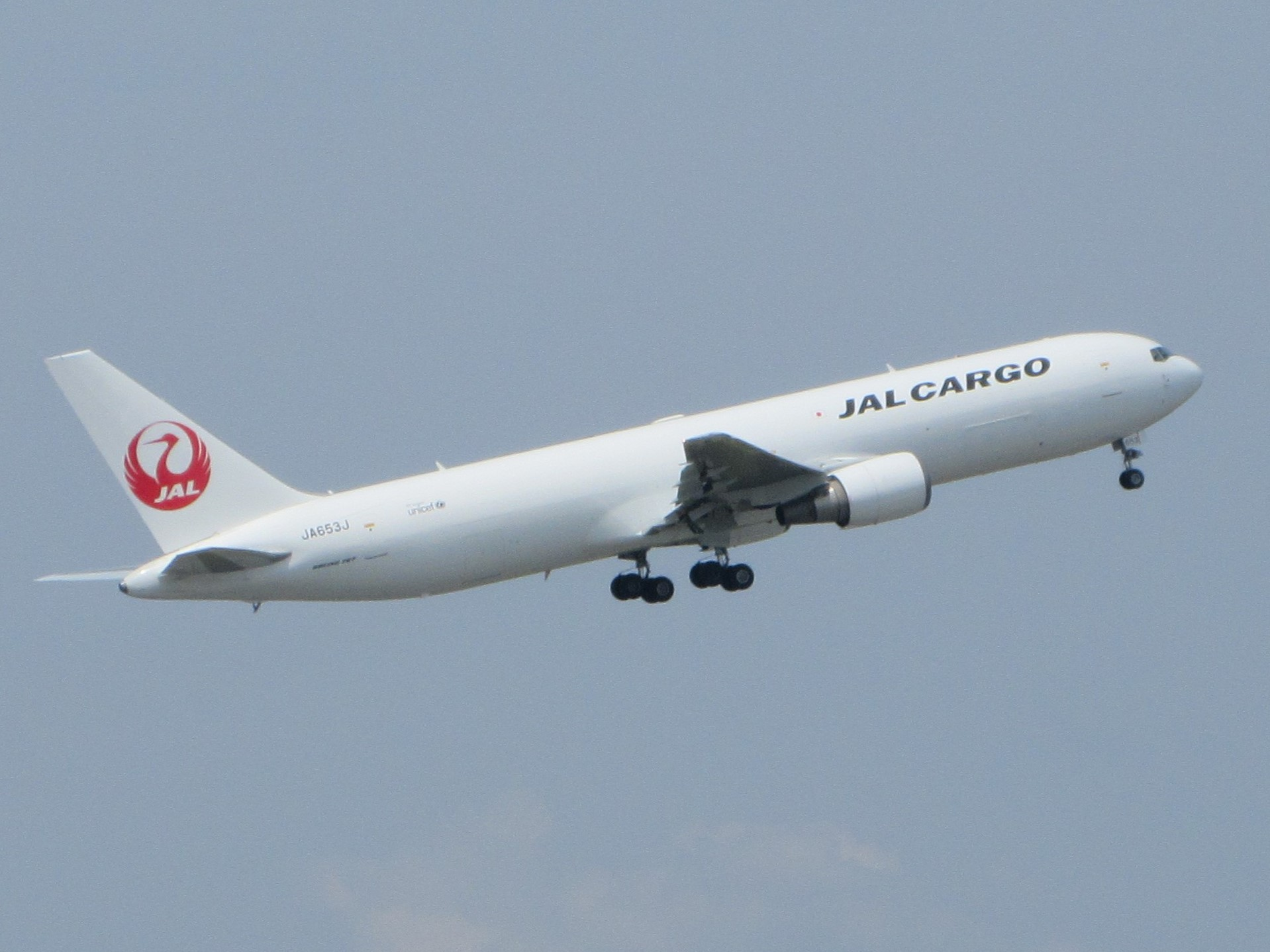
Boeing 767-300BCF

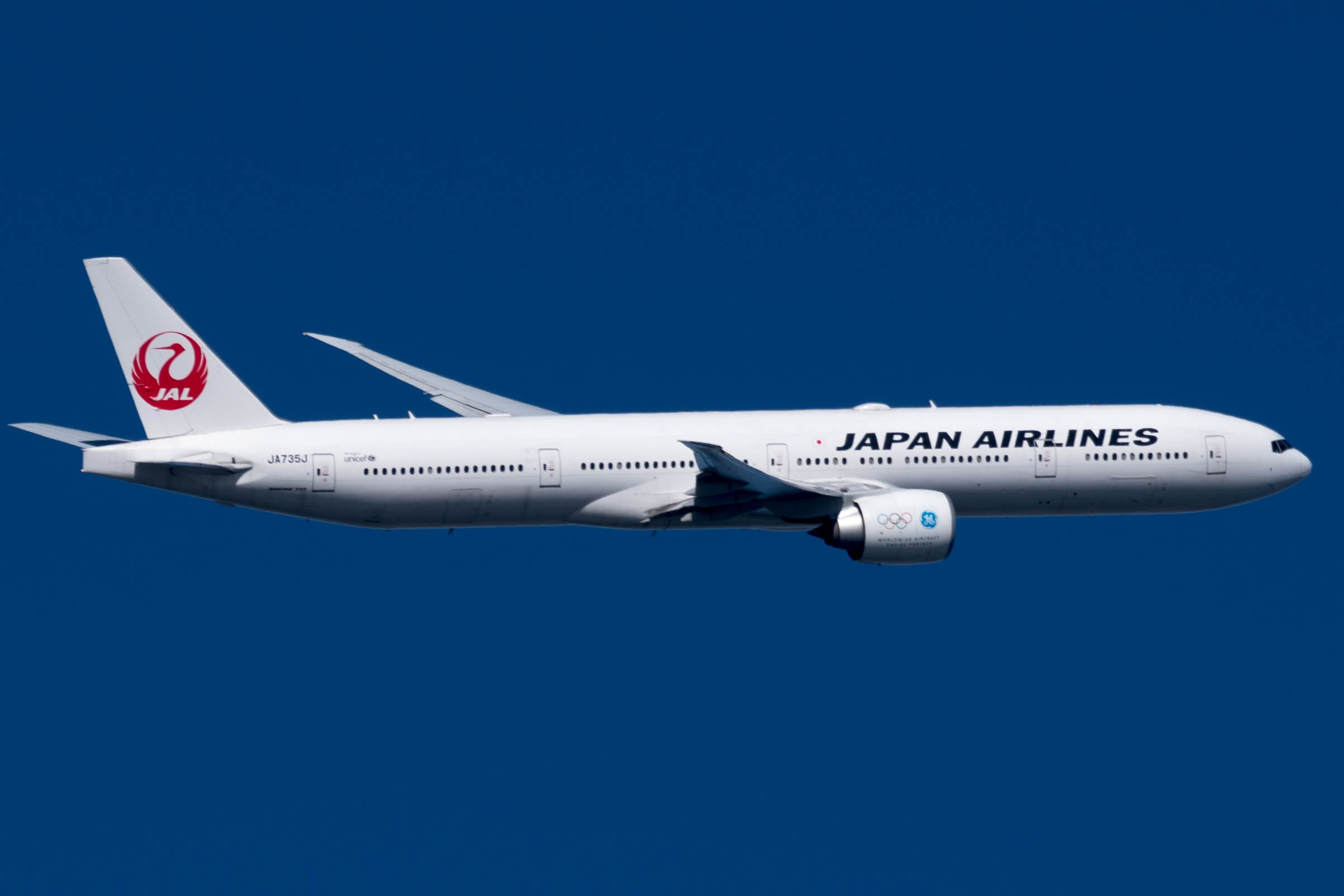
Boeing 777-300ER

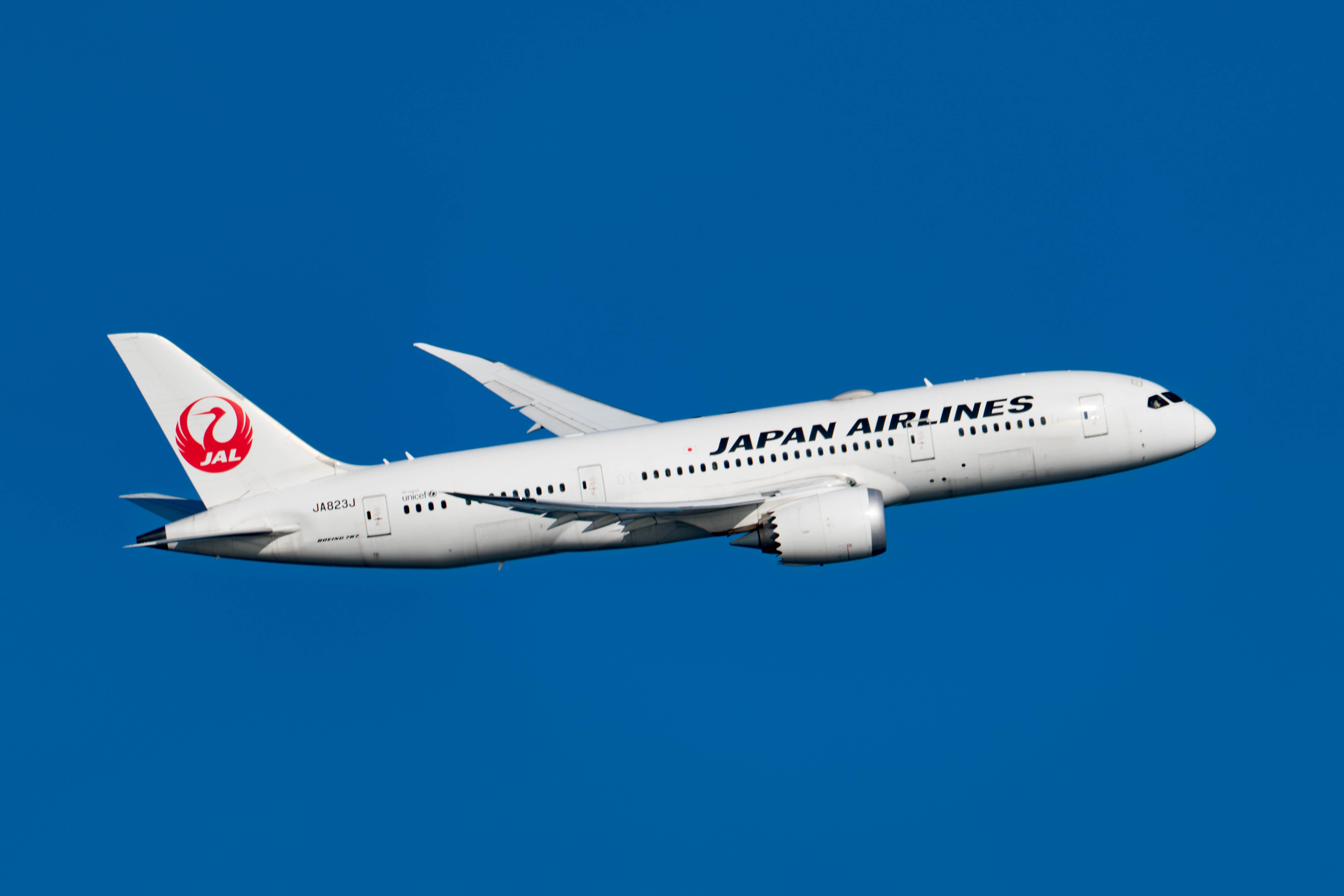
Boeing 787-8

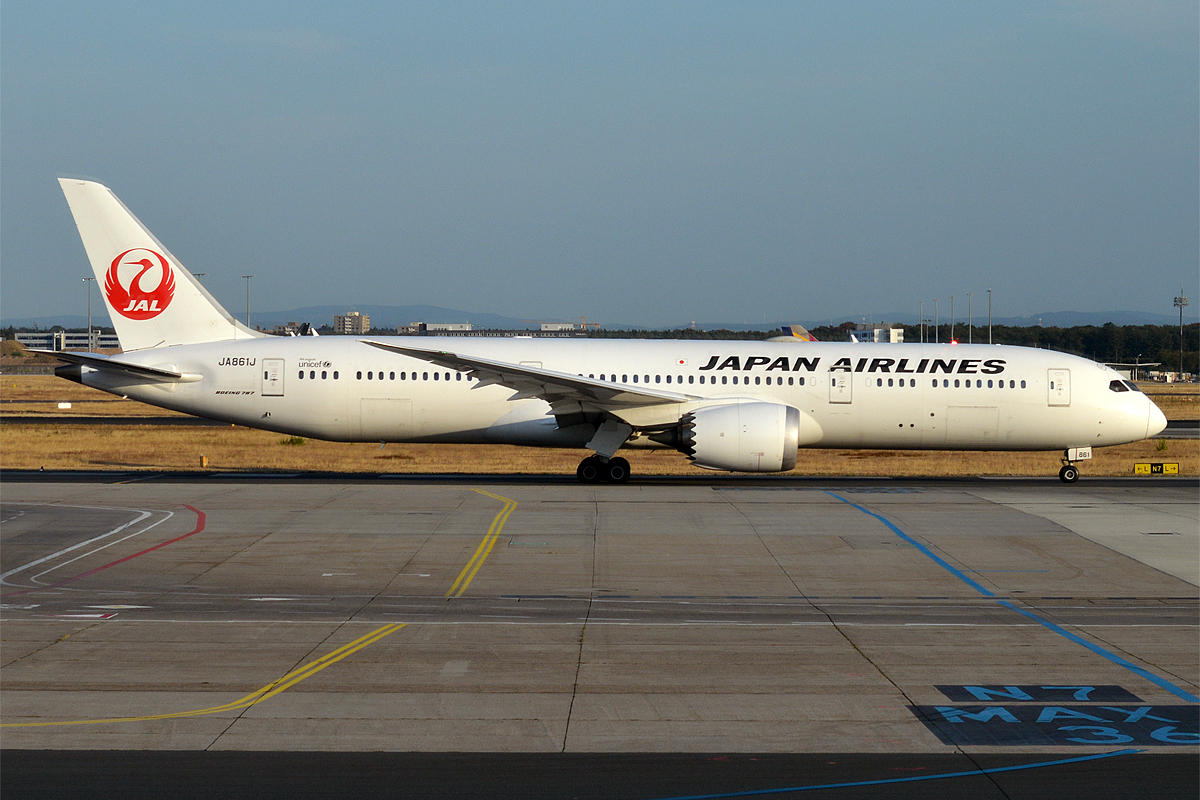
Boeing 787-9

As the Japanese government plans to add more slots at Tokyo's Haneda Airport by 2020 (in time for the 2020 Summer Olympics), Japan Airlines intends to order more wide-bodies for growth in 2018 or 2019: it could exercise its 25 options on Airbus A350s on top of its 31 firm orders, due for delivery from 2019, and study others such as the proposed Boeing New Midsize Airplane or the 787-10 to add to its 787-9 with 10 remaining to be delivered. Japan Airlines' Airbus A350 is currently maintained via the MRO subsidiary of Safran, OEMServices.

Japan Airlines operates a mixture of narrow-body and wide-body aircraft. The airline provides economy class service on all routes; business class (J) service with larger seats in the cabin front on most major domestic routes; premium economy on some international routes; business class on all international routes; and first class on some long-haul and domestic routes.

On 5 December 2017, JAL announced it had invested $10 million in the aircraft manufacturer Boom Supersonic, which is currently developing the Overture supersonic airliner capable of seating up to 80 passengers. In exchange for its funding, JAL will be able to pre-order up to 20 Boom aircraft.

=== Cargo ===
JAL Cargo is a freighter airline operating for JAL. It ended dedicated freighter aircraft operations in October 2010 after more than 30 years of service. It operated both propeller and jet aircraft through the years, most recently, Boeing 747-400s (including aircraft converted from passenger to freighter configuration) and Boeing 767-300Fs. However, in 2023, JAL announced that they would bring back dedicated cargo 767 freighters, in a response to changes in labor regulations forcing Japanese truckers to work less hours.

== Former fleet ==
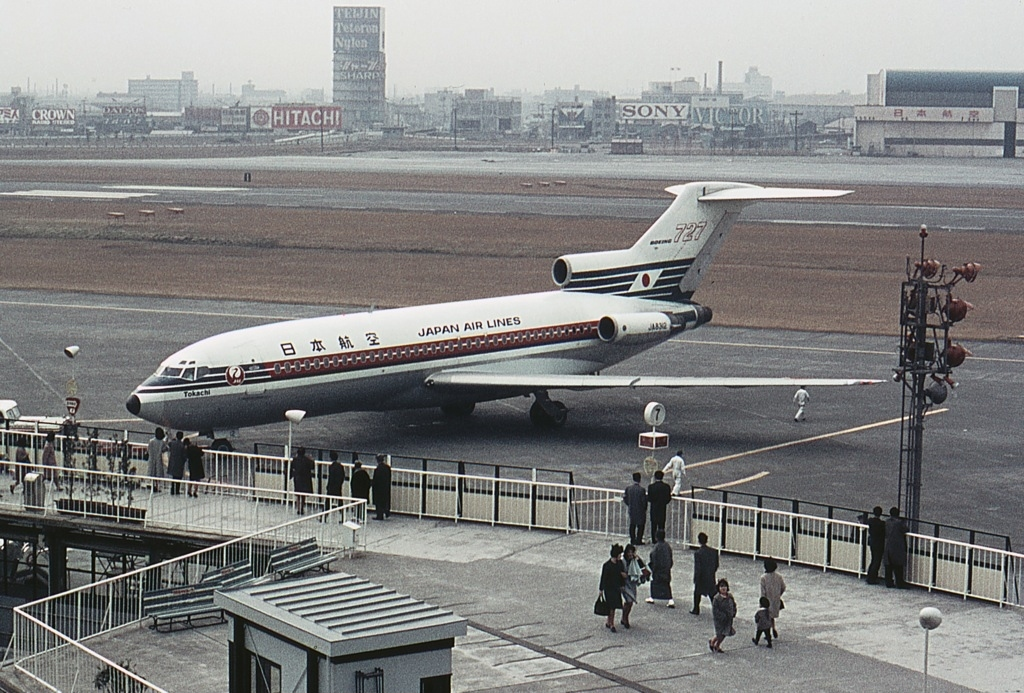
A Boeing 727-100 at Tokyo's Haneda Airport in 1964

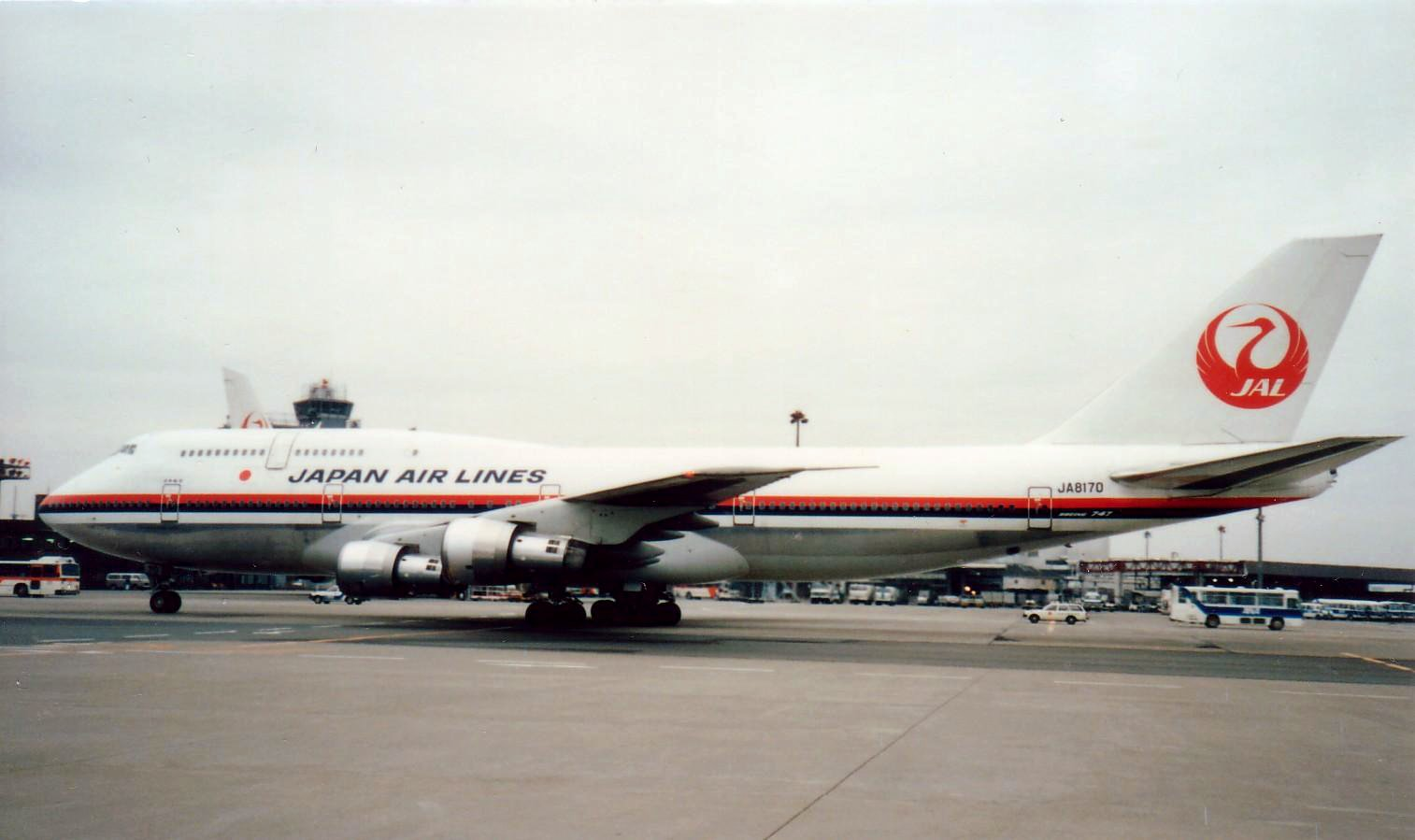
A Boeing 747-100BSR/SUD with stretched upper deck in 1987

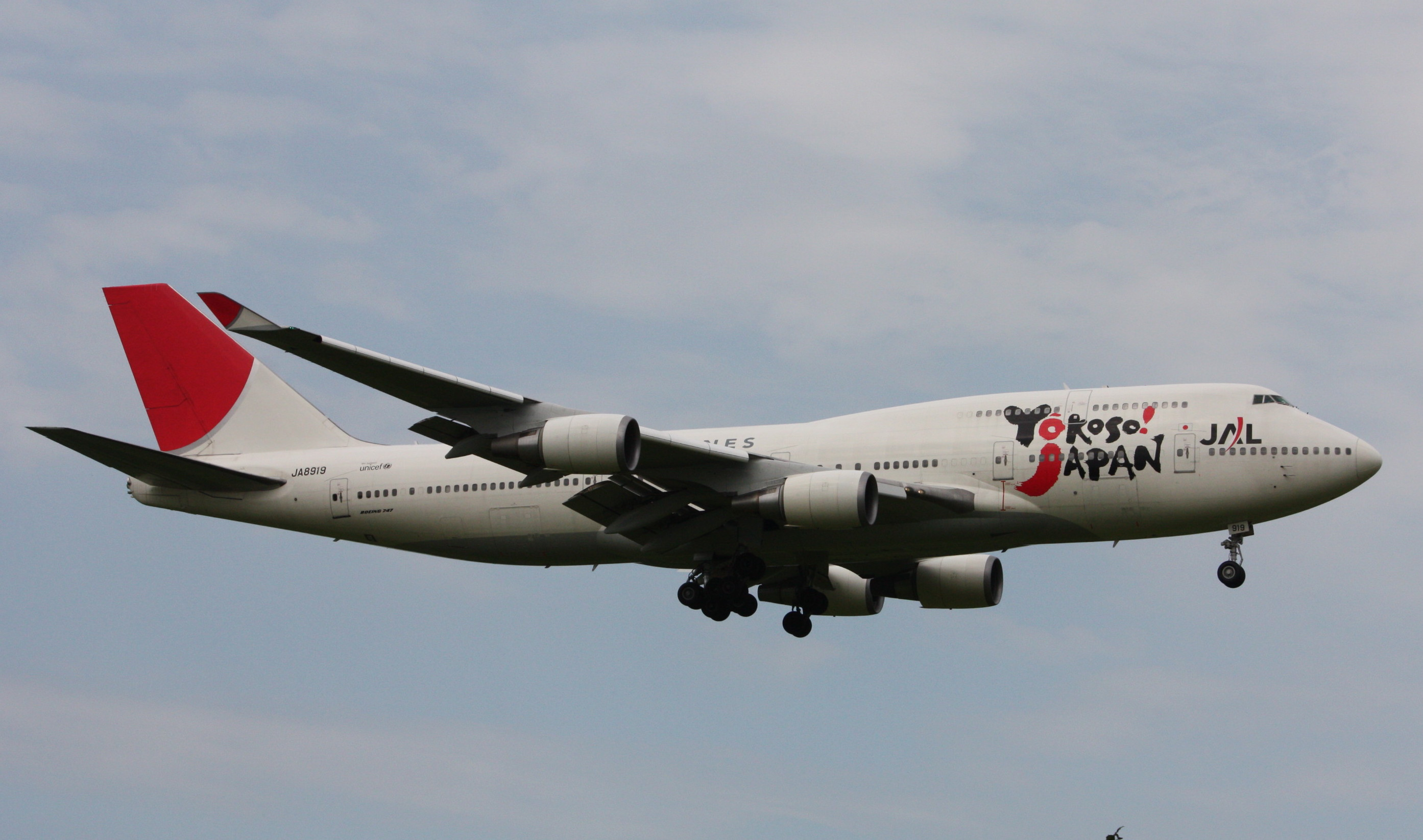
A Boeing 747-400 with Yokoso! Japan tiles

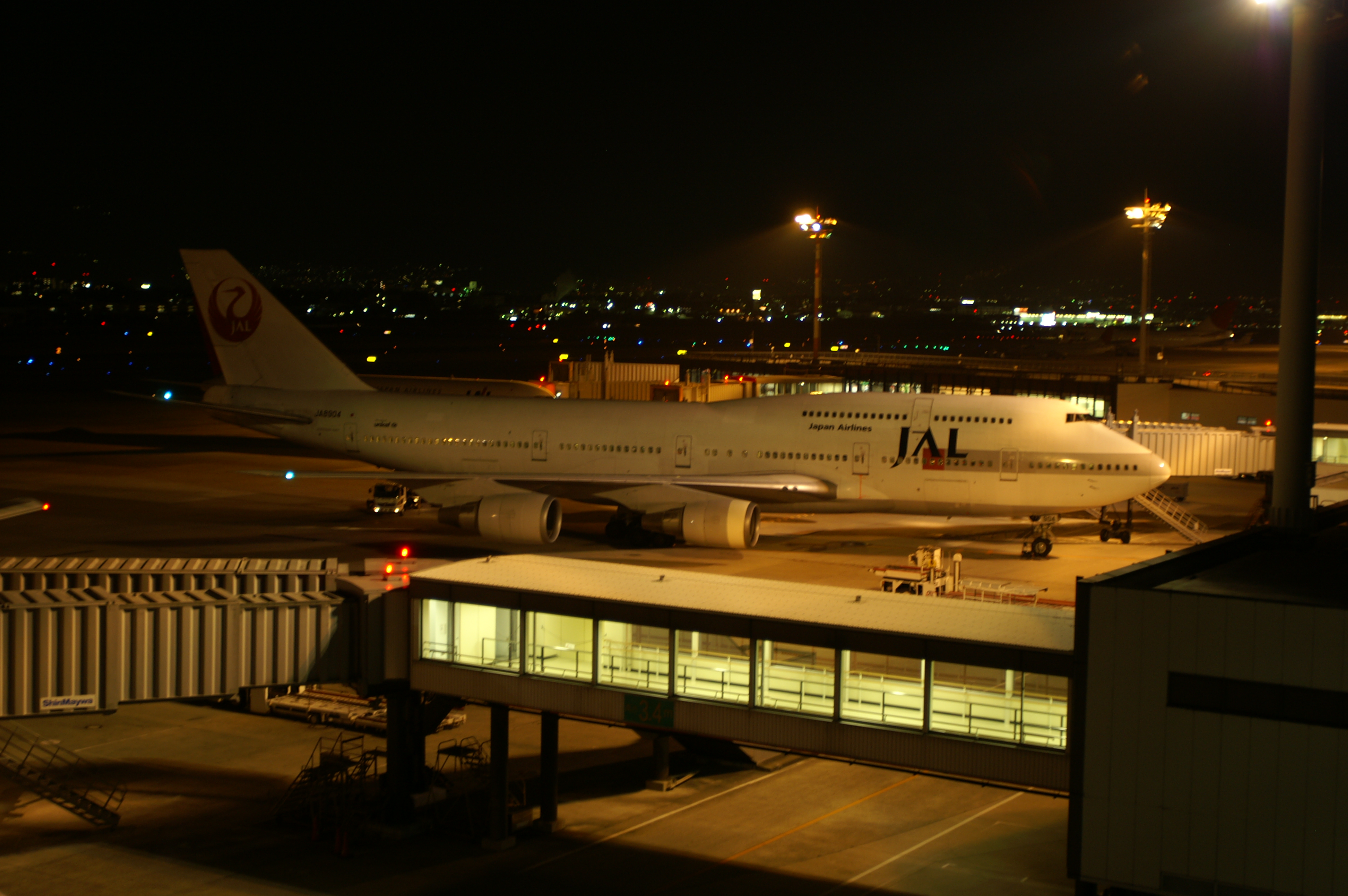
A Boeing 747-400D (domestic version)

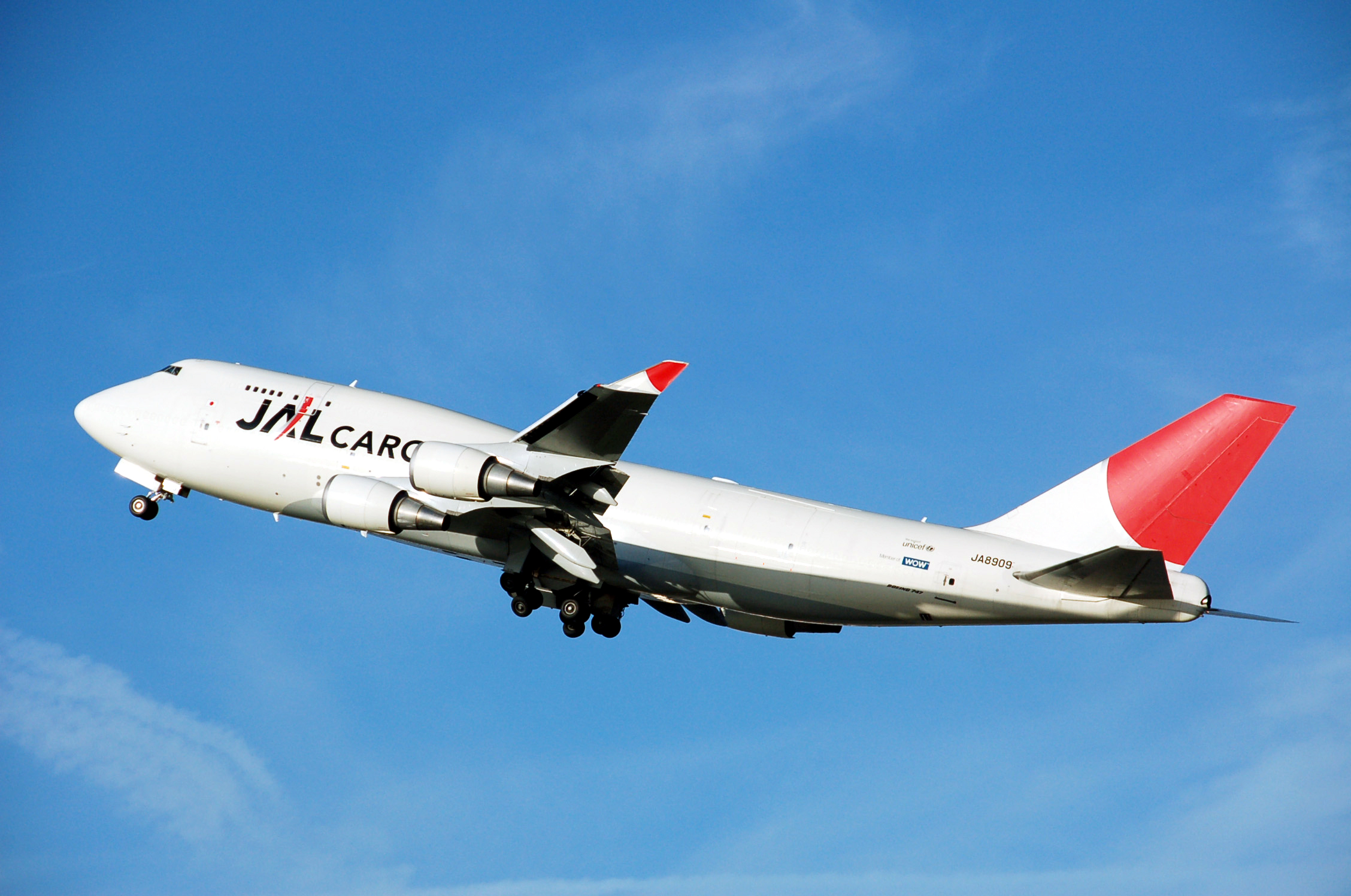
JAL Cargo Boeing 747-400BCF in 2007

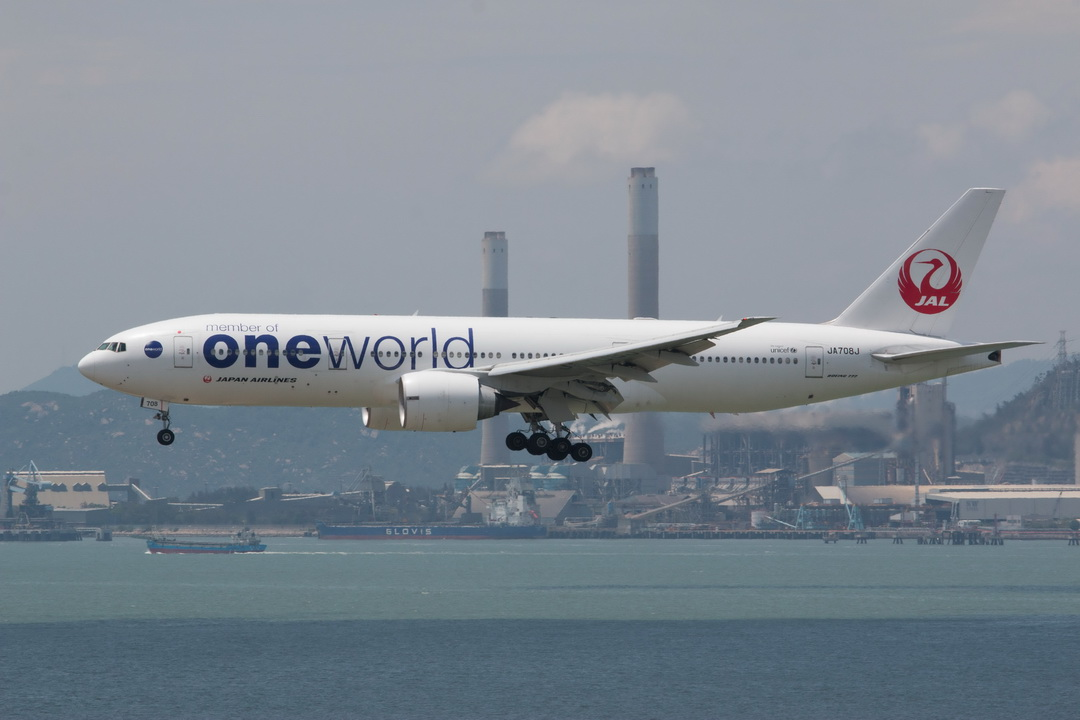
A Boeing 777-200ER with Oneworld livery

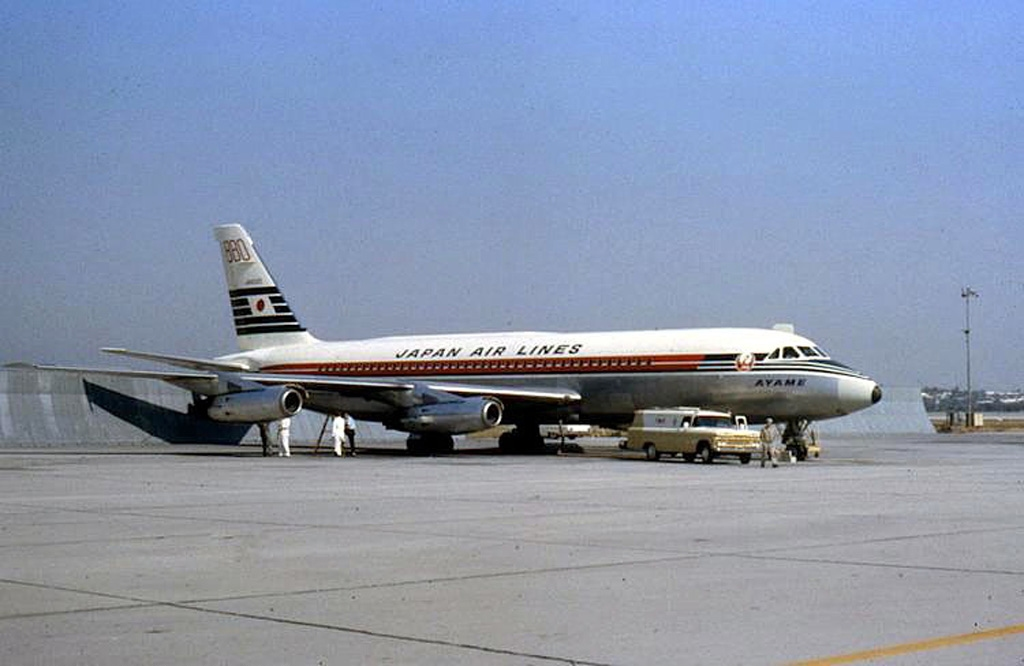
A Convair 880 at Los Angeles International Airport in 1964

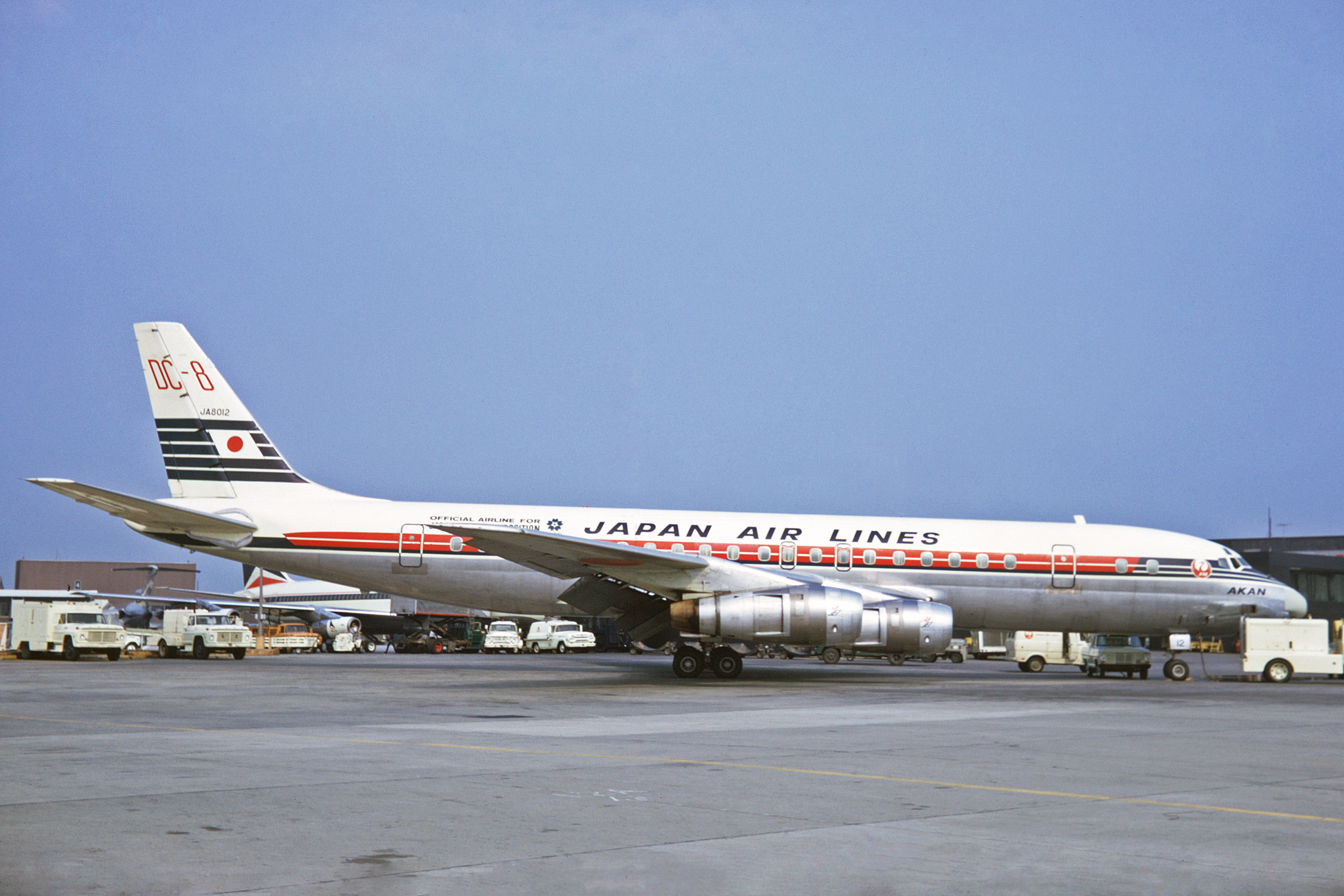
A Douglas DC-8-53 at New York in 1970

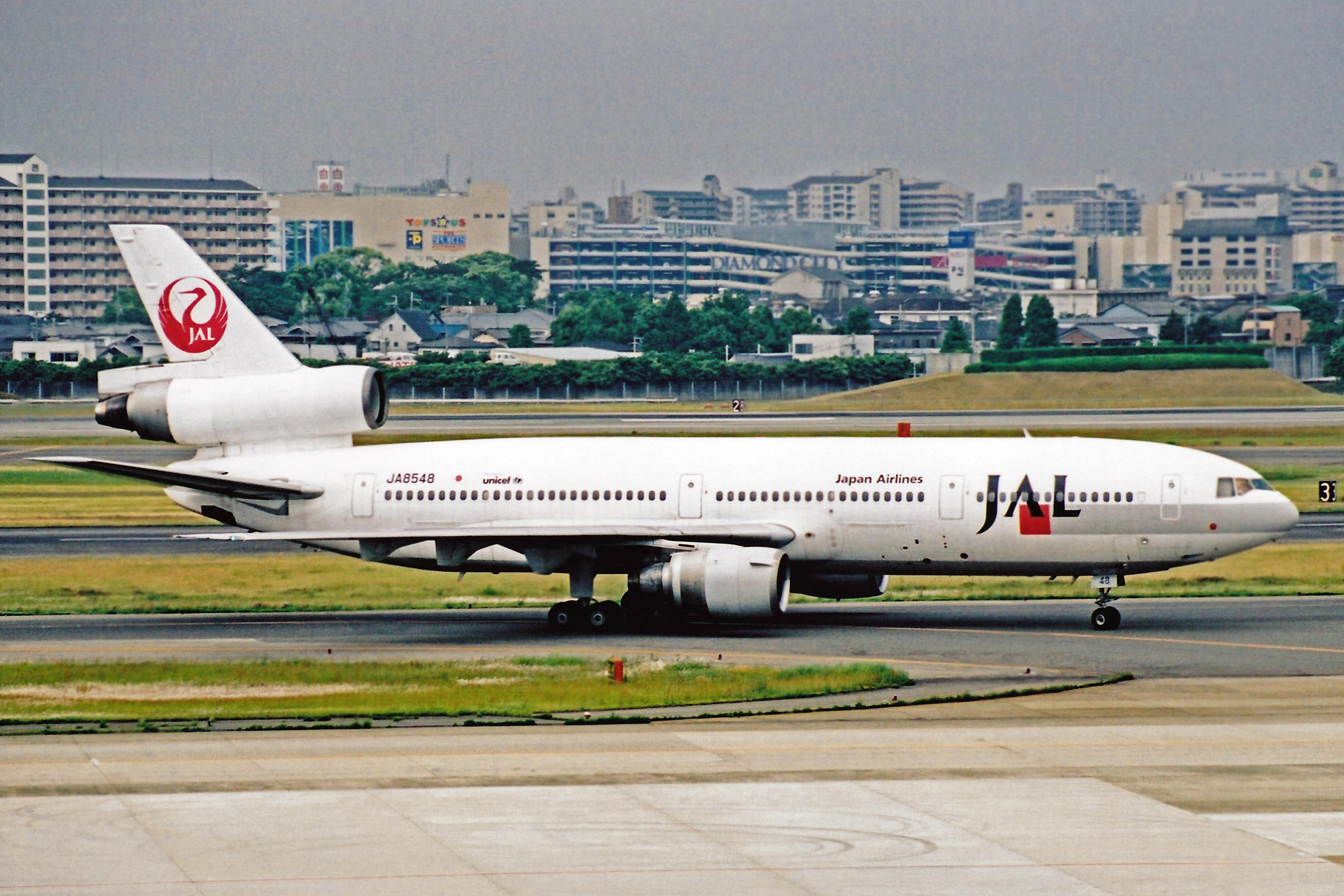
A McDonnell Douglas DC-10-40

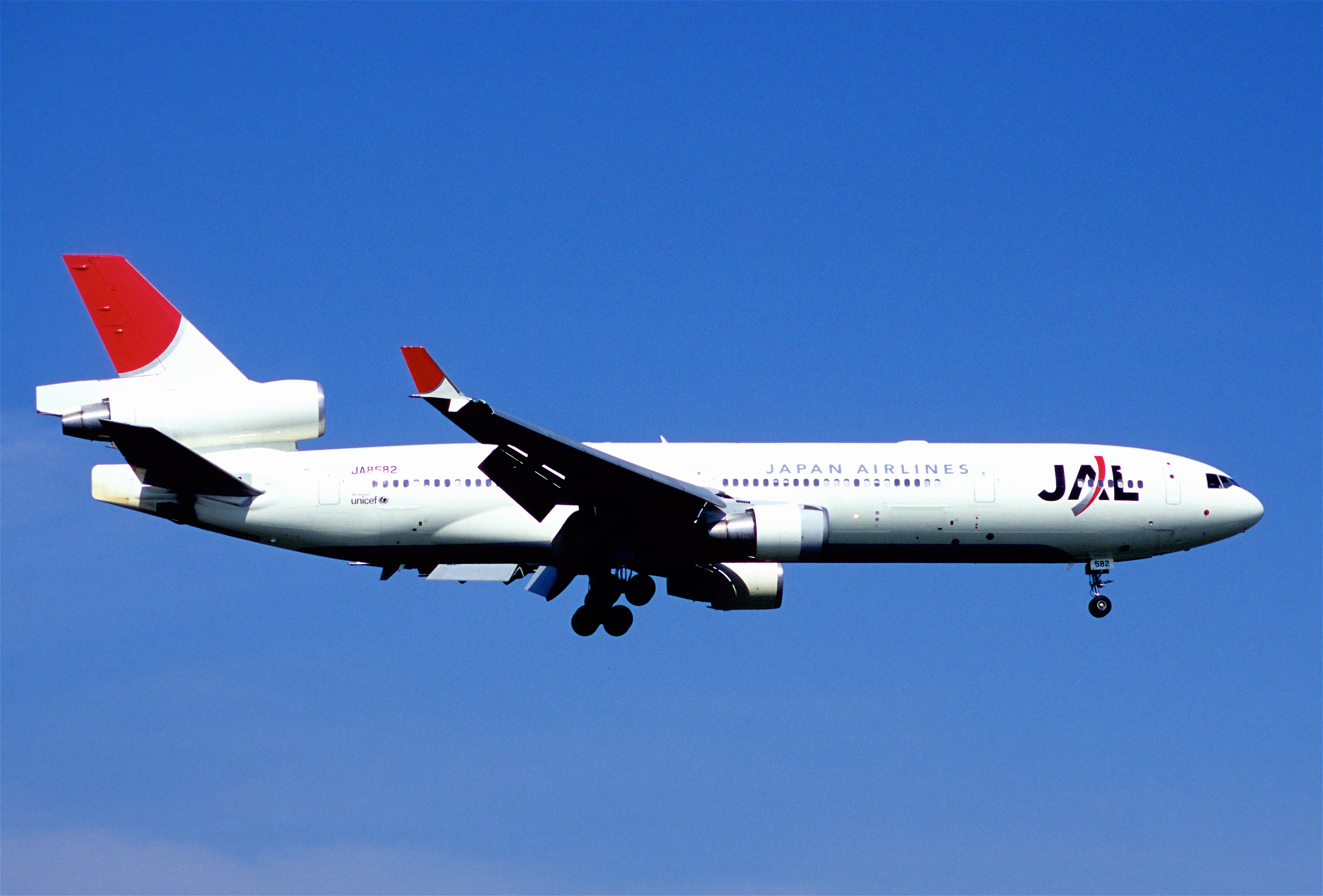
A McDonnell Douglas MD-11

Japan Airlines previously operated the following aircraft:

Japan Airlines historical fleet
Aircraft	Total	Introduced	Retired	Notes
Airbus A300-600R	22	2006	2011	Taken over from merged Japan Air System.
Airbus A350-900	1	2021	2024	Written off as flight JL516.
Beechcraft H18	Unknown	1969	Unknown	Used for pilot training.
Boeing 727-100	Unknown	1965	1988	
Boeing 737-400	7	1995	2003	
Boeing 747-100	7	1970	2002	Launch customer with Pan Am.
Boeing 747-100	1	1970	1977	Converted into a freighter and transferred to JAL Cargo.
Boeing 747-100SF	1	1977	1992	
Boeing 747SR-100	9	1973	2005	Launch customer.
Boeing 747SR-100	1	1973	1985	One(JA8119) crashed as JAL flight 123.
Boeing 747SR-100/SUD	2	1986	2006	
Boeing 747-200B	23	1971	2007	
Boeing 747-200B	2	1971	1973	Converted into freighters and transferred to JAL Cargo.
Boeing 747-200F	8	1991	2008	
Boeing 747-200SF	3	1974	2007	
Boeing 747-300	16	1983	2009	
Boeing 747-400	28	1990	2011	
Boeing 747-400	6	1990	2005	Converted into freighters and transferred to JAL Cargo.
Boeing 747-400BCF	6	2006	2010	
Boeing 747-400D	8	1991	2011	Launch customer.
Boeing 747-400F	2	1991	2011	
Boeing 767-200	4	1985	2011	
Boeing 767-300	20	1986	2021	Launch customer.
Boeing 767-300ERF	3	2007	2010	Production freighters for JAL Cargo before suspension of dedicated cargo services.
Boeing 777-200	8	1996	2021	
Boeing 777-200	7	1996	2021	Taken over from merged Japan Air System.
Boeing 777-200ER	11	2002	2023	
Boeing 777-300	7	1998	2021	
Boeing 777-300ER	4	2005	2025	Includes the first Boeing 777-300ER prototype (JA732J) and second Boeing 777-300ER prototype (JA731J).
Convair 880	9	1961	1971	
Douglas DC-3	1	1951	1951	Operated invitational flights for three days on 27 August 1951.
Douglas DC-4	2	1952	1964	
Douglas DC-6B	10	1954	1969	Operated the airline's inaugural international flight. Some aircraft were converted into freighters.
Douglas DC-7C	5	1958	1965	Some aircraft were converted into freighters.
Douglas DC-8-30	4	1960	1975	
Douglas DC-8-50	15	1962	1982	
Douglas DC-8-50	1	1962	1972	Crashed as flight JL471.
Douglas DC-8-60	29	1968	1988	
Douglas DC-8-60	1	1968	1968	Crashed as flight JL2.
Douglas DC-8-60	1	1968	1972	Crashed as flight JL446.
Douglas DC-8-60	1	1968	1977	Crashed as flight JL715.
Douglas DC-8-60	1	1968	1982	Crashed as flight JL350.
Douglas DC-8-60F	4	1968	1988	
Douglas DC-8-60F	1	1968	1977	Crashed as flight JL1045.
Martin 2-0-2	2	1951	Unknown	Operated the airline's inaugural scheduled flight.
McDonnell Douglas DC-10-40	20	1976	2005	
McDonnell Douglas MD-11	10	1993	2004	All MD-11s were named after J-Birds. Later sold to UPS Airlines for freighter conversion.
McDonnell Douglas MD-81	11	2006	2010	Taken over from merged Japan Air System.
McDonnell Douglas MD-87	8	2006	2008	Taken over from merged Japan Air System.
McDonnell Douglas MD-90-30	16	2006	2013	Taken over from merged Japan Air System.
NAMC YS-11	1	1969	1970	Used for postal service.
NAMC YS-11	1	1969	1970	Used for passenger service.
Tupolev Tu-114	1	1967	1969	Used in association with Aeroflot.
