= Harchand Singh =

Indian politician (born 1916)

Member of Parliament, Lok Sabha
- In office 1991–1996
- Preceded by: Bimal Kaur Khalsa
- Succeeded by: Satwinder Kaur Dhaliwal
- Constituency: Ropar, Punjab

Personal details
- Born: 6 May 1916 Village Fatehgarh Chhana, Patiala district Punjab, British India
- Party: Indian National Congress

Harchand Singh (born 6 May 1916) was an Indian politician and belonged to Indian National Congress.He was elected to the Lok Sabha, lower house of the Parliament of India from Ropar in Punjab.
