= Bimal Kaur =

Indian politician (1950–1991)

Bibi Bimal Kaur Khalsa

Member of Parliament, Lok Sabha
- In office 2 December 1989 – 13 March 1991
- Preceded by: Charanjit Singh Atwal
- Succeeded by: Harchand Singh
- Constituency: Ropar

Personal details
- Born: 7 November 1950 Goray, Hoshiarpur, Punjab, India
- Died: 2 September 1991 (aged 40) Mohali, Punjab
- Party: Shiromani Akali Dal (Amritsar)
- Spouse: Beant Singh (m. 1976; died 1984)
- Children: 3, including Sarabjeet Singh Khalsa
- Occupation: politician

Bibi Bimal Kaur (7 November 1950 – 2 September 1991) was an Indian politician and the wife of Beant Singh, one of the two assassins of Indira Gandhi.

== Early and personal life ==
Bibi Bimal Kaur Khalsa was born to Sardar Gurbachan Singh into Ramdasia Sikh family at Delhi, India. She married Beant Singh on 23 January 1976 at a local gurdwara.

Bibi Bimal Kaur was a nurse at Lady Hardinge Medical College when her husband assassinated Indira Gandhi. Immediately after the assassination she was apprehended by the Indian security forces, she disappeared for several days, leaving her children Amrit, Sarabjeet and Jassi at home. She was detained, interrogated, and most likely tortured for two weeks. The Damdami Taksal paid for her children's education for two years. Bibi Bimal Kaur stayed in Delhi until 1985 when she and the family moved to Punjab with the assistance of the Damdami Taksal. From there she worked with Sikh Student Federations and began to call out the injustices of the government, the false encounter issues.

Her father-in-law, Beant Singh's father Sucha Singh Maloa, was also elected as a member of parliament. Sarbjeet Singh, her son, was nominated by the SAD (A) headed by Simranjit Singh Mann to run for parliament from the Bathinda and Mansa in 2004. In 2024, Sarabjeet Singh won from Faridkot by a margin of more than 70 thousand votes.

== Imprisonment and politics ==
She contested from two Vidhan Sabha seats in the 1985 Punjab Legislative Assembly election, Chamkaur Sahib and Pakka Kalan as an independent candidate. She finished second in both the constituencies.

On April 30, 1986, then Chief Minister Surjit Singh Barnala ordered troops into Darbar Sahib again to flush out the militants who were residing in the gurudwara complex. On June 4, 1986, she went to Darbar Sahib with 3,500 members, to mark the anniversary of the Operation Blue Star and to speak on the atrocities of the government. at this time Surjit Barnala essentially had his guards throughout the Gurudwara complex to ensure stop the Khalistan movement. She delivered an incendiary speech. The crowd cheered for Khalistan and openly threatened to kill Surjit Singh Barnala. In a confrontation with his men and Sikh protesters, a guard was killed.

After her speech, she was arrested, charged for murder, and served 2 years in jail. In 1989 she campaigned for Lok Sabha from Ropar, and she won a seat with a ticket from Shiromani Akali Dal (Amritsar). She now had further leverage, and political strength, both of which made her a more serious threat to the government.

== Death ==
Bimal Kaur died on 2 September 1991. The police said she died from electrocution from her washing machine. Some reports that reached the press indicated that Bimal kaur consumed cyanide. Both these reasons are disputed by her relatives. They said that she was picked up by police and poisoned with cyanide which they claimed was a common tactic against kharkus around that time. They demanded a post-mortem which, under normal circumstances, the police was bound to conduct on request but the police refused this.

== Electoral performance ==
Punjab Assembly election, 1985: Pakka Kalan
Party	Candidate	Votes	%	±%
SAD	Sujan Singh	17,017	28.62	
Independent	Bimal Kaur Khalsa	16,602	27.92	New
INC	Bagga Singh	15,576	26.20	
CPI	Gursewak Singh	6,966	11.72	
Majority		415	0.70	
Turnout		63,862	70.54	
Registered electors		90,539		
SAD hold				

1989 Indian general election: Ropar
Party	Candidate	Votes	%	±%
SAD(A)	Bimal Kaur Khalsa	424,010	60.38	New
INC	Raja Singh	1,93,434	27.54	▼13.16
BSP	Jaspal Singh	47,077	6.70	New
CPI	Lachhman Singh	25,143	3.58	▲3.28
Majority		2,30,576	32.84	▲20.91
Turnout		7,14,245	68.47	▼6.10
Registered electors		10,43,186		
SAD(A) gain from SAD				

== In popular culture ==
A Punjabi movie named Chardikala was released on 29th May 2026 based on life of Bimal Kaur Khalsa where Roopi Gill performed her role
