= Beant Singh (assassin) =

Assassin of Indira Gandhi

- Born: Beant Singh; 6 January 1959; Jaitu, East Punjab, India
- Died: 31 October 1984 (aged 25); New Delhi, India
- Cause of death: Shot by police after assassinating Indira Gandhi
- Occupation: Bodyguard
- Employer: Government of India
- Title: Quomi Shaheed (National Martyr) by Akal Takht
- Criminal charge: Assassination of Indira Gandhi
- Spouse: Bimal Kaur Khalsa (m. 1976)
- Children: Sarabjeet Singh Khalsa
- Parent: Baba Sucha Singh (father)

Beant Singh (6 January 1959 – 31 October 1984) was one of the two bodyguards who assassinated Indian Prime Minister Indira Gandhi at her New Delhi residence on 31 October 1984.

== Early life and family ==
Photograph of Beant Singh in ceremonial garb

Beant Singh was born into a Ramdasia Sikh family to Baba Sucha Singh and Kartar Kaur.

Beant Singh's widow, Bimal Kaur Khalsa, initially joined a Sikh militant group and was later imprisoned. She was subsequently elected as a member of the Lok Sabha from the Ropar constituency. His father, Baba Sucha Singh, was also elected to the Lok Sabha from Bathinda.

Their son, Sarabjeet Singh Khalsa, was elected to the Lok Sabha from Faridkot in 2024.

== Assassination of Indira Gandhi and death ==
The assassination was motivated by revenge for Operation Blue Star, which the Indian government had carried out at the Harmandir Sahib (Golden Temple) in Amritsar.

As Gandhi passed through a wicket gate guarded by Satwant Singh and Beant Singh, the two opened fire. Beant Singh fired five rounds into her abdomen from his .38 revolver, and Satwant Singh fired 25 rounds from his Sterling submachine gun after she had fallen. Beant Singh was immediately shot and killed by other guards. Satwant Singh was later hanged in 1989, along with accomplice Kehar Singh.

== Legacy ==
In 2003, a Bhog ceremony was held at the Akal Takht in the Golden Temple complex in Amritsar, where tributes were paid to the assassins.

In 2004, his death anniversary was observed at the Akal Takht, where his mother was honoured by the head priest, and tributes were paid to Satwant Singh and Kehar Singh by various political parties.

On 6 January 2008, the Akal Takht declared Beant Singh and Satwant Singh 'martyrs of Sikhism'.

The Shiromani Akali Dal observed the death anniversary of Beant Singh and Satwant Singh as a 'martyrdom day' for the first time on 31 October 2008. Since then, their 'martyrdom day' has been observed annually at the Akal Takht.
