= Pakka Kalan Assembly constituency =

Former constituency of the Punjab Legislative Assembly

Coordinates: 30.03°N 74.86°E

Pakka Kalan
- Former constituency No. 110 for the Punjab Legislative Assembly

Constituency details
- Country: India
- State: Punjab
- District: Bathinda
- Lok Sabha constituency: Bathinda
- Established: 1957
- Abolished: 2012
- Total electors: 125,989 (2002)
- Reservation: SC

Pakka Kalan was a Punjab Legislative Assembly constituency till 2012.

== Members of the Legislative Assembly ==
Year	Member	Party
1957	Dhanna Singh	Indian National Congress
1957	Inder Singh	Indian National Congress
1962	Hardit Singh	Shiromani Akali Dal
1967	Karnail Singh	Akali Dal – Sant Fateh Singh Group
1969	Trilochan Singh	Indian National Congress
1972	Surjit Singh	Shiromani Akali Dal
1977	Sukhdev Singh	Shiromani Akali Dal
1980	Bhagat Singh	Shiromani Akali Dal
1985	Sujan Singh	Shiromani Akali Dal
1992	Baldev Singh	Indian National Congress
1997	Makhan Singh	Shiromani Akali Dal
2002	Gurjant Singh	Communist Party of India
2007	Makhan Singh	Indian National Congress
Dissolved into Bathinda Rural

== Election results ==
=== 1985 ===
Punjab Assembly election, 1985: Pakka Kalan
Party	Candidate	Votes	%	±%
SAD	Sujan Singh	17,017	28.62	
Independent	Bimal Kaur Khalsa	16,602	27.92	New
INC	Bagga Singh	15,576	26.20	
CPI	Gursewak Singh	6,966	11.72	
Majority		415	0.70	
Turnout		63,862	70.54	
Registered electors		90,539		
SAD hold				

=== Previous results ===
Year	A C No.	Name	Party	Votes	Runner Up	Party	Votes
2007	109	Makhan Singh	INC	49983	Darshan Singh Kotfatta	SAD	44376
2002	110	Gurjant Singh	CPI	34254	Makhan Singh	SAD	32477
1997	110	Makhan Singh	SAD	39873	Rameshwer Dass	INC	28844
1992	110	Baldev Singh	INC	7674	Bhola Singh	CPI	3970
1985	110	Sujan Singh Male	SAD	17017	Bimal Kaur	IND	16602
1980	110	Bhagat Singh	SAD	23845	Gurjant Singh	INC (I)	20262
1977	110	Sukhdev Singh	SAD	19711	Gursewak	CPI	18460
1972	99	Surjit Singh Male	SAD	28152	Mohinder Singh	IND	8381
1969	99	Trilochan Singh	INC	25064	Karnail Singh	SAD	18163
1967	99	Karnail Singh	ADS	19968	Trilochan Singh	INC	15865
1962	69	Hardit Singh Male	AD	18639	Dhanna Singh	INC	8746
1957	120	Dhanna Singh	INC	30183	Jangir Singh	CPI	26999
1957	120	Inder Singh	INC	30268	Jangir Singh	CPI	26655
