= Chatin Singh Samaon =

Indian politician

Member of Parliament, Lok Sabha
- In office 1998–1999
- Preceded by: Harinder Singh Khalsa
- Succeeded by: Bhan Singh Bhaura
- Constituency: Bathinda, Punjab

Personal details
- Born: 20 November 1942 (age 83)
- Party: Akali Dal

Chatin Singh Samaon is an Indian politician. He was a Member of Parliament, representing Bathinda, Punjab in the Lok Sabha the lower house of India's Parliament as a member of the Akali Dal.
