= Dardis =

Dardis (Irish: Dairdis) is an Irish surname.

== People with the surname ==
- John Dardis (born 1945), Irish politician
- Martin Dardis (1922–2006), American soldier, police officer, investigator and reporter who linked the Watergate burglars to President Nixon's reelection committee
- Tom Dardis (1926–2001), American author and editor
- Rena Dardis (1924–2017), publisher and founder of Anvil Press and The Children's Press.

== See also ==
- Dardi (disambiguation)
