= Indian Airlines Flight 440 =

1973 plane crash in India

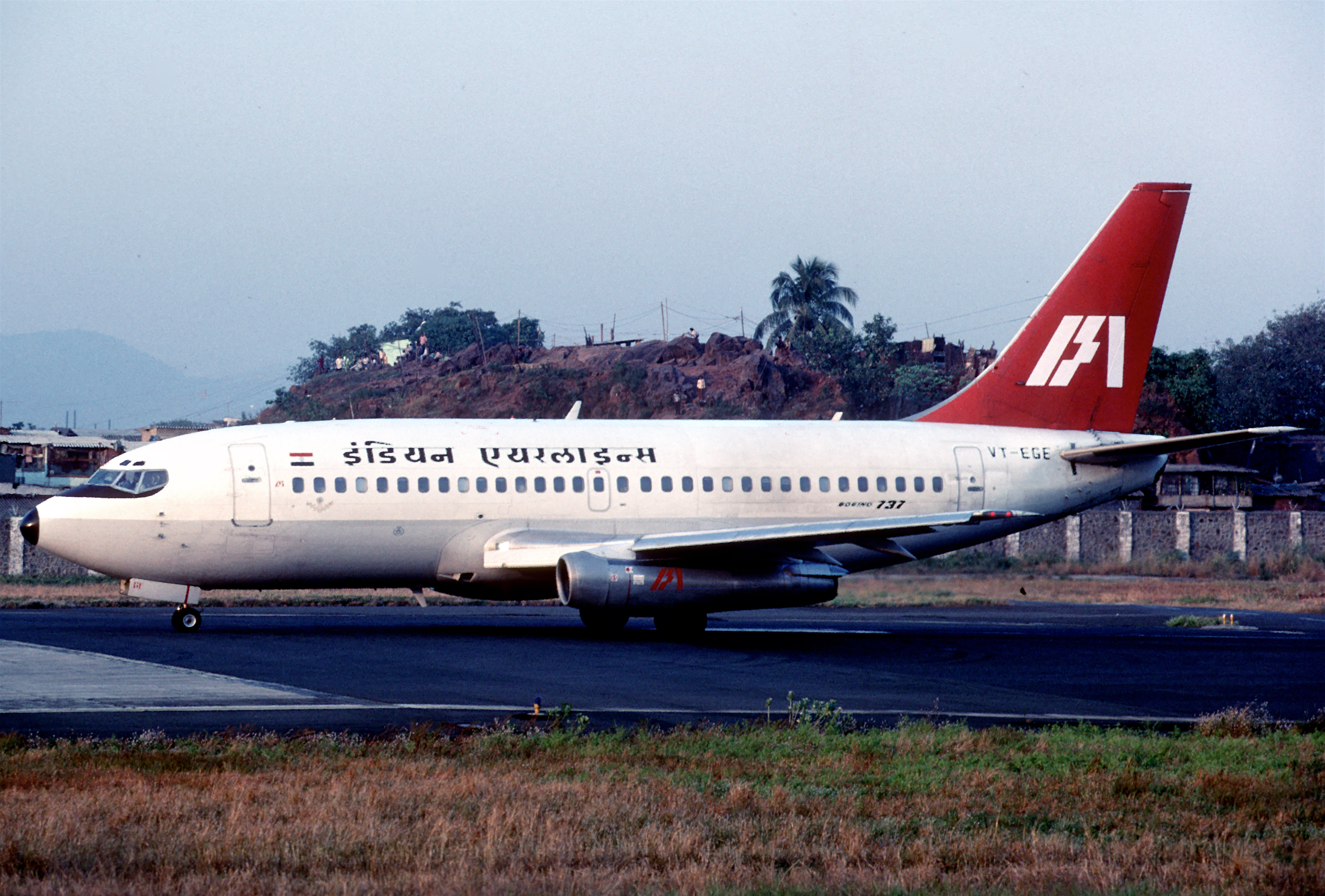
- An Indian Airlines Boeing 737-200, similar to the one involved in the crash

Accident
- Date: 31 May 1973
- Summary: Controlled flight into terrain
- Site: New Delhi, India

Aircraft
- Aircraft type: Boeing 737-2A8
- Aircraft name: Saranga
- Operator: Indian Airlines
- IATA flight No.: IC440
- ICAO flight No.: IAC440
- Call sign: INDAIR 440
- Registration: VT-EAM
- Flight origin: Madras Airport, Chennai, Tamil Nadu, India
- Destination: Palam International Airport, New Delhi, India
- Occupants: 65
- Passengers: 58
- Crew: 7
- Fatalities: 48
- Injuries: 17 (10 serious, 7 minor)
- Survivors: 17

Indian Airlines Flight 440 was a flight on 31 May 1973 operated by a Boeing 737-200 that crashed while on approach to Palam Airport (now Indira Gandhi International Airport) killing 48 of the 65 passengers and crew on board.

== Accident ==
Flight 440 was a scheduled domestic passenger flight from Madras (now Chennai), Tamil Nadu to New Delhi. A Boeing 737 named Saranga was used for the flight. As Flight 440 approached Palam International Airport in driving dust and a rainstorm, the aircraft struck high tension wires during a NDB approach with visibility below minimal. The aircraft crashed and caught fire. 48 of the 65 passengers and crew on board Flight 440 perished in the accident. Rescue officials said the survivors were in the front of the aircraft, although one survivor reported sitting in the back row.

The survivors included three Americans and two Japanese. The dead included four Americans, three Britons, and one woman from Yemen. Notable survivors included Bhan Singh Bhaura Member Parliament and V. K. Madhavan Kutty, an eminent journalist and writer. Among the dead was Indian Minister of Iron and Steel Mines, Mohan Kumaramangalam, Member of Parliament, Lok Sabha and Communist Party of India politician K. Baladhandayutham and former Member of Parliament, Rajya Sabha and Indian National Congress politician Devaki Gopidas and Indian businessmen Mallikarjun Reddy Kakani and Raghunatha Reddy Kakani.

== Cause ==
Investigators determined the Indian Airlines Flight 440 crash was caused by the crew descending below the minimum decision height.

== See also ==
- Japan Air Lines Flight 471, another aviation disaster that took place at Palam International Airport less than a year prior to Indian Airlines Flight 440.
