= Satwant Singh =

Bodyguard and assassin of Indira Gandhi (1962–1989)

- Born: 1962; Agwan, Dera Baba Nanak, Gurdaspur, Punjab
- Died: 6 January 1989 (aged 26–27); Tihar Jail, New Delhi, India
- Occupation: Bodyguard of the Prime Minister of India
- Employer: Government of India
- Title: Quomi Shaheed (National Martyr) by Akal Takht
- Spouse: Surinder Kaur (m. 1988)
- Status: Executed by hanging
- Conviction: Assassination of Indira Gandhi
- Penalty: Death

Satwant Singh (1962 – 6 January 1989) was one of the bodyguards, along with Beant Singh, who assassinated the Prime Minister of India, Indira Gandhi, at her New Delhi residence on 31 October 1984. The assassination was in retaliation for Indira Gandhi's Operation Blue Star. He was executed for his role in the assassination in 1989.

== Assassination of Indira Gandhi ==
The motivation for the assassination of Indira Gandhi was revenge for Operation Blue Star carried out by the Indian government on Harmandir Sahib, in Amritsar, India.

Beant Singh drew a .38 revolver and fired three shots into Indira Gandhi's abdomen; as she fell to the ground, Satwant Singh fired all 30 rounds from his Sten submachine gun into her abdomen (thus, 33 bullets were fired in total, of which 30 bullets hit her). Both assassins subsequently dropped their weapons and surrendered.

Beant Singh was immediately shot to death by other guards present. Satwant Singh was arrested and later sentenced to death by hanging along with co-conspirator Kehar Singh. In his court statement, Satwant Singh appealed for end to communal violence in the country, while pinning the blame for the same on Indira and Rajiv Gandhi. The execution was carried out on 6 January 1989.

== Aftermath ==
The assassination of Gandhi brought their immediate families into the limelight, resulting in their winning two Lok Sabha seats from state of Punjab. The Lok Sabha is a directly elected 543 member house of the Parliament of India.

In the aftermath of the executions of Satwant Singh and Kehar Singh, communal violence occurred in Punjab, resulting in 14 Hindus being killed by militants. In 2003, a Bhog ceremony was held at the highest Sikh temporal seat in Akal Takht, located in the Golden Temple Complex in Amritsar, where tributes were paid to Indira Gandhi's assassins.

In 2004, the anniversary of his death was again observed at Akal Takhat, Amritsar, where his mother was honored by the head priest and tributes were paid to Satwant Singh and Kehar Singh by various political parties. In 2007, the death anniversaries of Satwant Singh and his wife were observed in various parts of Punjab and other countries. On 6 January 2008, the Akal Takht declared Beant Singh and Satwant Singh "martyrs of Sikhism", while the SGPC also labeled them "martyrs of the Sikh nation".

The Sikh-centric political party in India, Shiromani Akali Dal, observed the death anniversary of Beant Singh and Satwant Singh as "martyrdom" for the first time on 31 October 2008. Every 31 October since, this date has been observed at Sri Akal Takht Sahib.

A film called Kaum de Heere was made about him in 2014.

== Personal life ==
Singh's father was Tarlok Singh. He married Surinder Kaur (daughter of Virsa Singh) on 2 May 1988 while he was in prison. His fiancée wed him in absentia by "marrying" his photo in an Anand Karaj.
