= Dhanna Singh Gulshan =

Indian politician

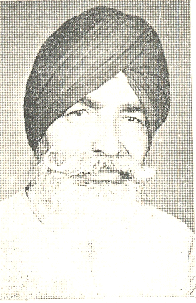

Member of Parliament, Lok Sabha
- In office 1962–1967
- Succeeded by: Kikar Singh
- In office 1977-1980
- Preceded by: Bhan Singh Bhaura
- Succeeded by: Hakam Singh
- Constituency: Bathinda, Punjab

Personal details
- Born: 1910
- Party: Akali Dal
- Spouse: Vasant Kaur
- Children: 1 son and 5 daughters including Paramjit Kaur Gulshan

Dhanna Singh Gulshan was an Indian politician. He was a Member of Parliament, representing Bathinda, Punjab in the Lok Sabha the lower house of India's Parliament as a member of the Akali Dal.
