= Japan Air Lines Flight 446 =

1972 aviation accident

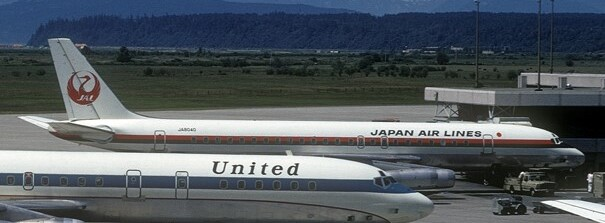
- JA8040, the aircraft involved in the accident, seen in July 1972

Accident
- Date: 28 November 1972
- Summary: Aerodynamic stall due to pilot error
- Site: Sheremetyevo International Airport, Moscow, Russian SFSR, Soviet Union

Aircraft
- Aircraft type: McDonnell Douglas DC-8-62
- Aircraft name: Hida
- Operator: Japan Air Lines
- Registration: JA8040
- Flight origin: Copenhagen Airport, Copenhagen, Denmark
- Stopover: Sheremetyevo International Airport, Moscow, Russian SFSR, USSR
- Destination: Tokyo International Airport (Haneda Airport), Tokyo, Japan
- Occupants: 76
- Passengers: 62
- Crew: 14
- Fatalities: 62
- Injuries: 14
- Survivors: 14

Japan Air Lines Flight 446 was a scheduled Japan Air Lines flight from Sheremetyevo International Airport of Moscow, Russian SFSR, Soviet Union to Tokyo International Airport (Haneda Airport) in Ōta, Tokyo, Japan. On November 28, 1972, the Douglas DC-8 on the route crashed during the initial climb phase upon takeoff from Sheremetyevo. While it is established by investigation that the direct reason for the crash was stalling shortly after takeoff, the Soviet Accident Investigation Committee noted the possibility of accidental deployment of the spoilers and reduced thrust due to engine problems as the cause for this accident.

== Accident ==
On November 28, 1972, Japan Air Lines Flight 446, operated by JA8040 (a DC-8-62), departed from Copenhagen Airport in Denmark bound for Tokyo International Airport in Japan with an intermediate stop at Sheremetyevo International Airport. At 7:51 PM Moscow time (1:51 AM, Nov 29 for Tokyo time), the flight took off from Sheremetyevo, reached an altitude of 100 metres (330 ft), stalled, and crashed 150 metres (490 ft) beyond the runway end, 30 seconds after leaving the ground.

On board were 6 flight crew (3 of them backup crew), 7 cabin crew, 1 employee of Japan Air Lines, and 62 passengers (of whom 52 were Japanese). All except for 5 flight attendants and 9 passengers perished, which made 62 fatalities. All survivors were seated near first-class seats located in the front section of the fuselage, suffering severe injuries. Eight of the surviving passengers were Japanese; the other was E. Bruce Smith of New Zealand.

The aircraft involved, JA8040, was delivered in July 1969, and written off less than 3.5 years after its delivery, thus being the most short-lived among Japan Airlines' DC-8s. This aircraft was noted for previous involvement in several major incidents: with the nickname Hida, it was used to carry passengers involved in the hijack of Japan Air Lines Flight 351 back to Japan in April 1970; on November 6, 1972, 22 days before the crash, this plane was offered to the hijackers of the JA351 hijack in response to their demand to flee to Cuba, although they were ultimately arrested at Haneda Airport.

This was the second fatal accident within the same calendar year for Japan Air Lines, following Japan Air Lines Flight 471 in June.

== Reason ==
The Soviet Accident Investigation Committee released (according to ICAO standard) the result of CVR and FDR data analysis.

CVR transcript:

00s (Takeoff roll begin)

10s "Time?" "Time is OK." "It's a bit slow..."
25s "Yes." "What?" "We are going."
30s "V1." at 129kt(IAS)
40s "Rotation." "Attention." at 145kt
45s "V2." at 154kt
50s (Mechanical sound)
55s "What's up?" "Spoiler!" at 350ft
60s "What's this?!" "Sorry..." "Left clear." at 300ft
65s "Engine! Engine! No.2! No.2 Engine!" at 100ft

70s (Sound of impact)

The survivors reported three abnormal situations indicating an engine failure, which matched the description of eyewitnesses on the ground:

- Abnormal vibration causing hand luggage to fall from overhead bins during the takeoff roll.
- The feeling of slowing down and falling immediately after leaving the ground.
- Engine bursting into flames.

The direct reason for the crash was an excessive nose-up attitude leading to a stall. The cause was determined to be one of the following by both sides (Japanese and Soviet investigating personnel):

- The accidental deployment of the spoilers during takeoff by the copilot.
- To deal with the asymmetric thrust of engines 1 and 2, the nose was inappropriately brought up.
- Furthermore, after inspecting the wreckage, it was found that despite winter conditions, the anti-ice device of the engines was not activated. Thus, it was possible that the engine thrust diminished due to ice buildup at the air intake.

Based on the above, the sequence of the entire accident could be presumed (but not determined) that:

- During the takeoff roll, the copilot tampered with the ground spoiler lever, while saying "This is not fitting in smoothly", then forgot to reset it to the correct position. So, even though the ground spoiler is for use immediately after landing only, the plane had to take off with it extended, generating excessive drag and causing loss of lift .
- After liftoff, the inappropriate nose-up input caused excessive pitch angle, which either further reduced the airflow into the ice-covered engine, which was already providing insufficient thrust, or caused the ice blocks built up on the front edge of the wing to be ingested by the engine.
- As a result, the engine's compressor stalled, surged, and substantially lost thrust, leading the plane to stall.

There was a theory that the copilot mistook the ground spoiler lever as the landing gear lever, but it is only a theory.

== Public reaction ==
The accident was attributed to pilot error, i.e. the co-pilot's lack of adequate attitude. The voice recorder recorded some of the captain's insensitive colloquial conversation, such as "Yeah(はいよ)" "Kay, Here we goin(やっこらさ)". After reports containing the information above was released to the public, Japan Airlines drew much criticism, such as "our floppy flag carrier" from public media, and the problem was even presented before the Diet of Japan.

Apart from this accident, Japan Air Lines suffered several other incidents attributed to human error in the same year: Haneda Airport overrun incident (on May 15), New Delhi crash (on June 14), Gimpo Airport overrun incident (on September 7), Bombay Airport overrun incident (on September 24). As a result, the airline suffered harsh criticism from the public.

In the popular comic strip Sazae-san, Machiko Hasegawa made a sarcastic scene, referring to these accidents:

While preparing for a business trip, Namihei panicked when he heard Sazae and Wakame talking about "Nikkō 'falling' again", and rushed toward them.
But it turned out that the two was just watching the sunset. Relaxed, Namihei shouted "Please say 'Nikkō is descending' !"

(Nikkō is an abbreviation for "Nihon Kōkū"(Japan Airlines in Japanese). Nikkō is also the Japanese term for "sunlight". In Japanese, "the sunlight is falling" means "the sun is setting").

== Aftermath ==
On DC-8s, spoilers are used after landing only (i.e. ground spoiler). Few methods can be used to reduce speed in flight (e.g. before landing), such as deploying the thrust reverser of inner engines on both port and starboard side. Other accidents attributed to accidental deployment of ground spoiler in flight have also occurred. As a result, modifications were done to make ground spoilers unable to deploy in flight altogether.

There are no emergency air brakes installed on DC-8s.
