= Kehar Singh =

Indian Sikh conspirer in the assassination of Indira Gandhi

- Born: Kehar Singh; 1935; Mustafabad, Patiala State, Punjab, British India
- Died: 6 January 1989 (aged 53–54); Tihar Jail, New Delhi, India
- Occupations: Clerk at Directorate General of Supplies & Disposals
- Employer: Government of India
- Title: Quomi Shaheed (National Martyr) by Akal Takht
- Status: Executed by hanging
- Conviction: Conspiracy in the plot to assassinate Indira Gandhi
- Penalty: Death

Kehar Singh was an Assistant (the name of the post later termed as Assistant Section Officer) in the erstwhile Directorate General of Supply and Disposal, New Delhi, and was tried and executed for conspiracy in the plot of the Indira Gandhi assassination, carried out by Satwant Singh and Beant Singh. He was hanged in Tihar Jail on 6 January 1989. Beant Singh was the nephew of Kehar Singh. The assassination was motivated by Operation Blue Star.

== Operation Blue Star ==
Operation Blue Star was launched by the Indian Army, to eliminate Jarnail Singh Bhindranwale and his followers who had been forced to seek cover in the Amritsar Golden Temple Complex by operations of the Indian government. The operation was launched in response to the deterioration of law and order in the State of Punjab. The targets of the government, within the Harmandir Sahib temple complex, were led by Jarnail Singh Bhindranwale and former Maj. Gen. Shabeg Singh. Maj. Gen. Kuldip Singh Brar had command of the action, operating under General Krishnaswamy Sundarji, of the Indian army.

The Golden Temple compound and some of the surrounding houses were fortified. The Statesman reported on 4 July that light machine-guns and semi-automatic rifles were known to have been brought into the compound by the militants. Faced with imminent army action and with the foremost Sikh political organisation, Shiromani Akali Dal (headed by Harchand Singh Longowal), abandoning him, Bhindranwale declared [that], "This bird is alone. There are many hunters after it".

Beant Singh was killed by gunfire at the scene of the assassination of Indira Gandhi, whereas Satwant Singh was arrested and Kehar Singh was later arrested for conspiracy in the assassination. Both were sentenced to death and hanged in Tihar jail in Delhi.

== Conspiracy evidence ==
However Balbir Singh was acquitted on appeal to the Supreme Court in August. The main conspiracy, which was that of making Khalistan, as alleged by the officially commissioned report on the killing, raises questions about the prosecution's case.

== Appeals and judgments ==
Similarly in the Supreme Court of India judgement, "In the instant case, the crime charged was not simply the murdering of the human being, but it was the crime of assassination of the duly elected Prime Minister of the country. The motive for the crime was not personal, but the consequences of the action taken by the Government in the exercise of constitutional powers and duties. In a democratic republic, no person who is duly constituted shall be eliminated by privy conspiracies. The 'Operation Blue Star' was not directed to cause damage to Akal Takht. Nor it was intended to hurt the religious feelings of Sikhs. The decision was taken by the responsible and responsive Government in the national interest. The late Prime Minister Indira Gandhi was, however, made the target for the consequences of the decision. The security guards who were duty-bound to protect the Prime Minister at the cost of their lives, themselves became the assassins. All values and all ideals in life; all norms and obligations were thrown to the winds. It was a betrayal of the worst order. It was the most foul and senseless assassination. The preparations for and the execution of this egregious crime deserved the dread sentence of the law."

Ram Jethmalani's last futile battle to save Kehar Singh was fought in the Supreme Court. The apex court that heard two petitions during the working hours and a hurried last minute plea found no merit. "I am arguing under the shadow of two hangmen", pleaded Jethmalani. For two hours, Jethmalani and Shanti Bhushan tried to impress that the President had not applied his mind on the mercy petition. Their plea was that the evidence on which he was to be hanged was circumstantial. The five judge bench headed by the Chief Justice refused to intervene. These were the last words of Jethmalani: "If this court can't intervene then it is not just my client who will hang tomorrow. Something much more vital will die. It will not be Kehar Singh who will be hanged; it will be decency and justice". Shanti Bhushan, who is father of Prashant Bhushan, said, "In fact, the court must decide whether a man should ever be sentenced to death on the basis of circumstantial evidence alone. Circumstantial evidence can never remove that last lingering speck of doubt about a man's guilt."

In the adjoining court, R. S. Sodhi, counsel for Satwant Singh, argued that with his hanging, a vital piece of evidence would be lost for ever. Two Indo-Tibet Border Police commandos had opened fire killing Beant Singh on the spot and injuring Satwant Singh immediately after the attack on Indira Gandhi. He only wanted the execution to be stayed till his evidence against the commandos was recorded. The court refused to grant relief. It was around 4.00 pm that a lawyer ran into the court of the Chief Justice, huffing and panting, and tripped over the threshold in his haste. Bruised and bleeding, he said he wanted to file petition on behalf of Satwant's parents to prove that the entire case stood vitiated. The petition was dismissed within a minute after the lawyer got his breath back.

At another level, the International Commission of Jurists pleaded with R. Venkataraman, to grant clemency to Kehar Singh. Commission Secretary General Niall MacDermot, British Labour Party politician, said he was profoundly disturbed by the rejection of pleas for mercy. Following is the text of the appeal:

The International Commission of Jurists is profoundly disturbed by the rejection of pleas for mercy which have caused deep concern among the jurists throughout the world. As appears from the judgment, the only substantial evidence on which his conviction was based was that he had talks with Beant Singh on various occasions but there was no evidence as to the contents of those talks. We beseech you to exercise your right and power to have regard to the merits of the case in order to prevent what might be a terrible error of justice.

However, in obscure Mustafabad, the native village of Kehar Singh about 10 km from Bassi Pathana on the Chandigarh-Sirhind road, his relatives were calm on the day of hanging. The relatives had heard the news broadcast by Radio Pakistan in the 9.00 am bulletin.

Kehar Singh was convicted and hanged on the morning of 6 January 1989, for his involvement in the Indira Gandhi assassination, carried out by Satwant Singh and Beant Singh. Satwant Singh and Kehar Singh's last words were, "Bole So Nihal, Sat Sri Akal", and they were allegedly in high spirits. Their ashes were not handed over to their families. The structures erected for their cremation in the Tihar jail were also demolished immediately.

== Honours and death anniversaries ==
In 2003, a Bhog ceremony was held at Akal Takhat, Amritsar where tributes were paid to late Prime Minister of India, Indira Gandhi's assassins.

In 2004, his death anniversary was again observed at Akal Takhat, Amritsar, where SGPC, Shiromani Akali Dal and head priest of Akal Takhat paid tributes to Satwant Singh and Kehar Singh.

Again, on 6 January 2008, the highest Sikh temporal seat (Akal Takhat, Amritsar) declared Kehar Singh and other assassins of former prime minister, Indira Gandhi; as martyrs of Sikhism. SGPC also paid homage to both Satwant Singh and Kehar Singh and called them "martyrs of Sikh nation". Shiromani Akali Dal observed their death anniversary as 'martyrdom' on 31 October 2008.
