= Ropar Lok Sabha constituency =

Former constituency in Punjab, India

Coordinates: 31.0°N 76.5°E

Ropar
- Former Lok Sabha constituency

Constituency details
- Country: India
- Region: North India
- State: Punjab
- Established: 1967
- Abolished: 2008

Ropar or Rupar was a Lok Sabha constituency in Punjab. It was dissolved in 2008.

== Members of Parliament ==
Most Successful parties from Ropar Lok Sabha
1. SAD (6 Times) (50.0%)
2. INC (5 Times) (41.7%)
3. SAD (A) (1 Times) (8.33%)

Election	Member	Party
1967	Buta Singh	Indian National Congress
1971	Buta Singh	Indian National Congress
1977	Basant Singh Khalsa	Shiromani Akali Dal
1980	Buta Singh	Indian National Congress
1985	Charanjit Singh Atwal	Shiromani Akali Dal
1989	Bimal Kaur Khalsa	Shiromani Akali Dal (Mann)
1992	Harchand Singh	Indian National Congress
1996	Basant Singh Khalsa	Shiromani Akali Dal
1997^	Satwinder Kaur Dhaliwal	Shiromani Akali Dal
1998	Satwinder Kaur Dhaliwal	Shiromani Akali Dal
1999	Shamsher Singh Dullo	Indian National Congress
2004	Sukhdev Singh Libra	Shiromani Akali Dal

^bypoll

- 2008 Onwards: Fatehgarh Sahib

== Election results ==
=== General elections 1989 ===
1989 Indian general election: Ropar
Party	Candidate	Votes	%	±%
SAD(A)	Bimal Kaur Khalsa	424,010	60.38	New
INC	Raja Singh	1,93,434	27.54	▼13.16
BSP	Jaspal Singh	47,077	6.70	New
CPI	Lachhman Singh	25,143	3.58	▲3.28
Majority		2,30,576	32.84	▲20.91
Turnout		7,14,245	68.47	▼6.10
Registered electors		10,43,186		
SAD(A) gain from SAD				

== See also ==
- Rupnagar (formerly known as Ropar)
- Fatehgarh Sahib Lok Sabha constituency
- List of constituencies of the Lok Sabha
