= Bhan Singh Bhaura =

Indian politician (1934–2004)

Personal details
- Born: 4 September 1934 Niamatpur, Punjab, India
- Died: 3 January 2004 (aged 69) New Delhi, India
- Party: Communist Party of India (CPI)
- Education: Panjab University

Bhan Singh Bhaura (4 September 1934 – 3 January 2004) was an Indian politician. He was a leader of the Communist Party of India in Punjab. He served as a member of the National Executive of the CPI as well as president for the Bharatiya Khet Mazdoor Union. He was also a Punjab State Executive member of CPI. He was elected to the Lok Sabha (lower house of the parliament of India) in 1971 and 1999 from the Bhatinda seat. He was elected to the Punjab Legislative Assembly twice as well.

== Student activism ==
Bhaura hailed from a poor peasant family in village Niamatpur Near Amargarh Sangrur district. He was the son of Sadhu Singh. Bhaura became politically active in the student movement, serving as secretary of the Punjab branch of the All India Students Federation and president of the All India Youth Federation in Punjab. He obtained a B.A. degree from Govt Ripudaman College Nabha Panjab University. During the colonial period, he took part in the struggle for Indian independence as well being active in the peasant movement.

== Legislator ==
He was elected to the Punjab Legislative Assembly in 1962, from the Dhuri (SC) seat. Bhaura obtained 20,658 votes (49.08% of the votes in the constituency), defeating the Congress, Jan Sangh and Swatantra candidates in the fray. He became the acting president of the Punjab Dihati Mazdoor Sabha (agricultural workers' union). In the 1967 election, he was elected to the Punjab Legislative Assembly from the Bhadaur (SC) seat. He obtained 14,748 votes (49.92%). Bhaura lost the Bhadaur seat in the 1969 election, finishing in third place with merely 430 votes (1.31%).

== Parliamentarian ==
He won the Bhatinda Lok Sabha seat in the 1971 general election. He obtained 138,092 votes (51.46%).

== Later elections ==
Bhaura lost the Bhatinda seat in the 1977 general election. He finished in third place with 62,639 votes (14.73%). This time the electoral contest in Bhatinda had been between Congress and Shiromani Akali Dal candidates, and Bhaura lost his deposit. He contested the Bhadaur assembly seat in 1985, finishing in third place with 7,932 votes (14.98%).

== Return to the Lok Sabha ==
Bhaura contested the Bhatinda seat in the 1998 general election. He finished in second place with 309,671 votes (45.66%). He regained the Bhatinda Lok Sabha seat in the 1999 general election. He obtained 327,484 votes (50.34%). His candidature was supported by Congress. In the Lok Sabha he was a member of the Committee on Science and Technology, Environment and Forests 1999-2000, and then a member of the Consultative Committee of the Ministry of Communications 2000-2004.

== Personal life ==
Bhaura's father was Sadhu Singh, a Sikh, and his mother was Mrs. Sardhi. village Niamatpur Dist Sangrur tehsil Malerkotla Near Amargarh. Bhaura completed his graduation at Govt. Ripudaman College, Nabha, District. Patiala. He married on 13 November 1966 to Kaushalya Chaman.

He is survived by a son, Dr. Rajneek Bhaura, who is an Assistant Director, Animal Production. Their son is married to Advocate Deepinder Kaur. He has two granddaughters: Jannat Deep Bhaura and Priya Raj Bhaura. Their family hails from Sangrur (Malerkotla) and currently lives in Patiala, Punjab.

== Indian Airlines Flight 440 ==
On 30 May 1973, Bhaura boarded Indian Airlines Flight 440, a scheduled domestic passenger flight from Madras (now Chennai), Tamil Nadu to New Delhi flown by a Boeing 737. While Flight 440 attempted to land at Palam International Airport during inclement weather, the aircraft struck high tension wires during a NDB approach with visibility below minima. The aircraft crashed and caught fire. 48 of the 65 passengers and crew on board died in the accident. Rescue officials said the survivors were in the front of the aircraft.

Among the dead was Indian Minister of Iron and Steel Mines, Mohan Kumaramangalam, Member of Parliament, Lok Sabha and Communist Party of India politician K. Baladhandayutham and former Member of Parliament, Rajya Sabha and Indian National Congress politician Devaki Gopidas and Indian businessman Raghunatha Reddy Kakani. Bhaura survived with injuries, as did V. K. Madhavan Kutty, a writer and entertainer.
