= Jagjit Singh Dardi =

Indian journalist

Jagjit Singh Dardi (born 19 January 1949) is an Indian journalist and an educationist from Punjab. He is the Editor-in-Chief of the Punjabi language daily newspaper Chardikala, a newspaper that was started in 1977. In 1970, Dardi started a fortnightly Charhdikala Marg, whose Founder Editor was his father G Harnam Singh. This fortnightly paper was converted into a daily newspaper in 1977. He is the Chairman of the Punjabi news channel Chardikla Time TV a position that further solidifies his role as a prominent media figure. He is also the Chairman of Sri Guru Harkrishan Group of Institutes, a chain of higher education institutes. He was awarded Padma Shri in the year 2022 for his services in national integration, communal harmony, contributions in the field of media, education and promotion of Punjabi language, culture and heritage. In 2022, the Department of Public Relations Chandigarh administration announced Dardi as the Chairperson of the Chandigarh Press Accreditation Committee.

Punjabi Media house Nirpakh Post published a biography of Dardi.

== Awards and recognitions ==
In the year 2022, Govt of India conferred the Padma Shri award, the third highest award in the Padma series of awards, on Jagjit Singh Dardi for his distinguished service in the field of trade and industry. The award is in recognition of his service as a "Veteran Punjabi Media Leader and Educationist, Chairman of Chardikala group". Other recognitions conferred on Jagjit Singh Dardi include:

Shiromani Patarkar Award by President of India in 1998 Shiromani Sahitkar Award by Govt. of Punjab in 1992 Honoured by World Punjabi Conferences in 1997 in the US and in Canada in 1989 Member of Press/ Media Advisory Committees of Lok Sabha in 1997-98 and Rajya Sabha in 2014 Member of the executive committee of The Newspaper Society (INS) since 1988 Member of Press Council of India since 2001 Member of Prime Ministers' media delegation since 1993
