= Teja Singh Dardi =

Indian politician

Member of Parliament, Lok Sabha
- In office 1985–1989
- Preceded by: Hakam Singh
- Succeeded by: Baba Sucha Singh
- Constituency: Bathinda, Punjab

Personal details
- Died: 27 April 1998
- Party: Akali Dal

Teja Singh Dardi (died 27 April 1998) was an Indian politician. He was a Member of Parliament, representing Bathinda, Punjab in the Lok Sabha the lower house of India's Parliament as a member of the Akali Dal.
