= V. K. Madhavan Kutty =

Indian journalist (1934–2005)

Veettikkattu Kundukuzhiyil Madhavan Kutty (17 January 1934 – 1 November 2005) was a journalist from the state of Kerala, India. He was long associated with the Mathrubhumi newspaper, a Malayalam daily based out of Kozhikode. He was stationed at New Delhi as Chief of Bureau for most of his career. He was well known among the journalism circles in the capital owing to his astute professionalism and efficiency. He retired as the editor of Mathrubhumi after serving for 40 years. He was also one of the founding directors of the Malayalam satellite channel Asianet. Madhavankutty survived the crash of Indian Airlines Flight 440 on May 31, 1973, which killed Union Minister Mohan Kumaramangalam and several others.

== Awards ==
- 1991: Kerala Sahitya Akademi Award.
- 2002: was presented Swadeshabhimani Award by the Government of Kerala for his contributions as a journalist. (Awarded by the President of India).

== Literary works ==
Apart from many in-depth articles, V K Madhavankutty has also authored several Malayalam & English novels. Some of his works are

- Asrikaram
- Ormakalute Virunnu
- Orttucollan: Malayalattinte Priyappetta Kavyasakalannal
- Oru Malayali Patrapravarttakante ormmakkurippukal
- The Unspoken Curse
- The Village before Time
