= Devaki Gopidas =

Indian politician

Member of Parliament Rajya Sabha
- In office 1962–1968
- Constituency: Kerala

Personal details
- Born: 1918
- Died: 31 May 1973 (aged 54–55) New Delhi, India
- Party: Indian National Congress

Devaki Gopidas (1918–1973) was an Indian politician from Kerala. She was a Member of Parliament, representing Kerala in the Rajya Sabha the upper house of India's Parliament as a member of the Indian National Congress from 1962 - 1968.

She was killed in the crash of Indian Airlines Flight 440 on May 31, 1973.

== Education ==
She completed schooling from Kottayam and college education from Government College for Women, Thiruvananthapuram. She entered into Congress politics in college. Later she studied law from Kolkata.

== Personal life and death ==
She was born in an Ezhava family at Karappuzha, Kottayam district on 10 May 1918 to Arangaserry Narayanan and T K Narayani. She married Gopidas from Vezhapra and settled in Kolkata.

Devaki died due to crash of Indian Airlines Flight 440 in 1973.
