= Baba Sucha Singh =

Indian politician

Member of Parliament, Lok Sabha
- In office 1989–1991
- Preceded by: Teja Singh Dardi
- Succeeded by: Kewal Singh
- Constituency: Bathinda, Punjab

Personal details
- Born: Maloa
- Died: 26 January 2007
- Party: Shiromani Akali Dal (Amritsar)
- Spouse: Kartar Kaur
- Children: 5, including Beant Singh

Baba Sucha Singh (died 26 January 2007) was an Indian politician belonging to Shiromani Akali Dal (Amritsar). He was elected to the Lok Sabha, lower house of the Parliament of India from Bathinda in Punjab. His son, Beant Singh was the assassin of Indian Prime Minister, Indira Gandhi.
