= Japan Air Lines Flight 471 =

1972 aviation accident

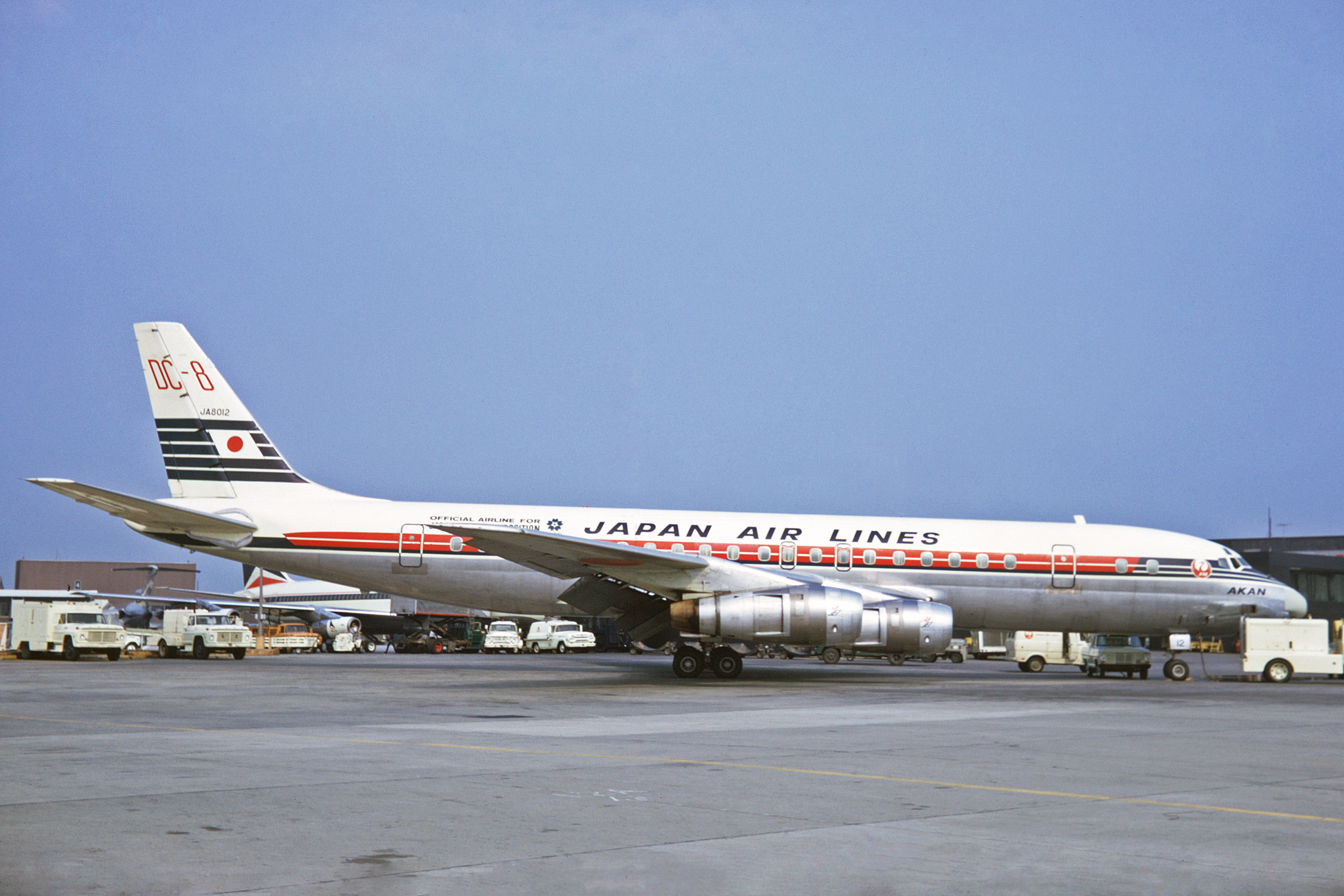
- JA8012, the aircraft involved in the accident, seen in 1970 in a previous livery

Accident
- Date: 14 June 1972
- Summary: Cause disputed: Controlled flight into terrain due to pilot error (India); False glide slope (Japan)
- Site: Near Palam International Airport, New Delhi
- Total fatalities: 90

Aircraft
- Aircraft type: Douglas DC-8-53
- Aircraft name: Akan
- Operator: Japan Air Lines
- IATA flight No.: JL471
- ICAO flight No.: JAL471
- Call sign: JAPAN AIR 471
- Registration: JA8012
- Flight origin: Tokyo International Airport, Tokyo, Japan
- 1st stopover: Kai Tak International Airport, British Hong Kong
- 2nd stopover: Don Mueang International Airport, Bangkok, Thailand
- 3rd stopover: Palam International Airport, New Delhi, India
- 4th stopover: Cairo International Airport, Cairo, Egypt
- 5th stopover: Leonardo da Vinci International Airport, Rome, Italy
- Last stopover: Frankfurt International Airport, Frankfurt, West Germany
- Destination: Heathrow Airport, London, United Kingdom
- Occupants: 89
- Passengers: 78
- Crew: 11
- Fatalities: 86
- Injuries: 3
- Survivors: 3

Ground casualties
- Ground fatalities: 4

Japan Air Lines Flight 471 was a Japan Air Lines international flight from Don Mueang International Airport in Bangkok, Thailand, to Palam International Airport (now Indira Gandhi International Airport) in New Delhi, India. On 14 June 1972 the Douglas DC-8 operating the flight, registered JA8012, crashed short of the New Delhi airport, killing 86 of the 89 occupants: 10 of 11 crew members, and 76 of 78 passengers. Four people on the ground were also killed.

== Passengers ==
Sixteen of the dead were Americans. Brazilian actress Leila Diniz was also among those killed, as was the sole Indian passenger on the flight, Dr. K.K.P. Narasinga Rao, a senior official of the Food and Agricultural Organization (FAO) of the United Nations.

An article in The Age stated the following nationalities: 17 from Victoria in Australia, 10 each from Japan and the United States, five from each from Italy and Sweden, three from West Germany, two each from France and Indonesia, and one each from Brazil, India, the Netherlands, and Norway. 31 travellers had booked their travel from Australia or New Zealand. The Hansard of the Japanese Diet stated that 10 Japanese nationals were passengers, with all but two first boarding in Tokyo and the remainder boarding in Hong Kong.

One of the cabin attendants killed in the crash was the sister of San'yūtei Enraku V.

== Sequence of events ==
The flight was on the Bangkok-New Delhi portion of its Tokyo-London route when the accident occurred. The flight took off from Don Mueang International Airport in Bangkok at 11:21 UTC en route to New Delhi. At 14:43 UTC, the flight was given clearance for a straight-in ILS approach to runway 28. The plane crashed into the banks of the Yamuna River not long after the 23 mile (43 km) report from the DME.

== Cause ==
The exact cause of the accident remains disputed. Investigators representing Japan pointed to the possibility of a false glide path signal causing the crash. Indian investigators claimed the crash was caused by pilot error, specifically the captain ignoring instrument indications and not having sight of the runway (the first officer was flying the approach to New Delhi).

== See also ==
- Indian Airlines Flight 440, another aviation disaster that took place at Palam less than a year after Japan Air Lines Flight 471.
- Cathay Pacific Flight 700Z, a crash in the same continent that happened shortly after
