= Bathinda Lok Sabha constituency =

Lok Sabha constituency in Punjab, India

Coordinates: 30.2°N 74.9°E

Bathinda PB-11
- Lok Sabha constituency
- Interactive Map Outlining Bathinda Lok Sabha constituency

Constituency details
- Country: India
- State: Punjab
- Assembly constituencies: Lambi; Bhucho Mandi; Bathinda Urban; Bathinda Rural; Talwandi Sabo; Maur; Mansa; Sardulgarh; Budhlada
- Established: 1952
- Reservation: None

Member of Parliament
- 18th Lok Sabha
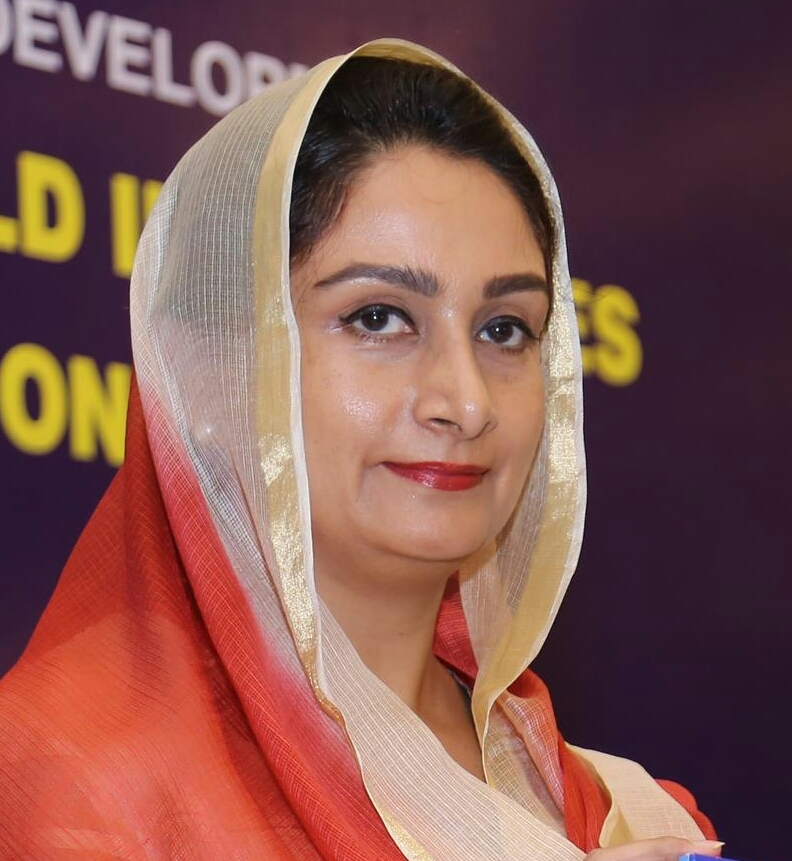
- Incumbent Harsimrat Kaur Badal
- Party: SAD
- Alliance: None
- Elected year: 2024
- Preceded by: Paramjit Kaur Gulshan

Bathinda Lok Sabha constituency is one of the 13 Lok Sabha (parliamentary) constituencies of Punjab state in northern India. In 18th Lokh Sabha, it is represented by Harsimart Kaur Badal. She has been representing Bathinda Lok Sabha Constituency in Lok Sabha since 2009. In general election of 2009, Harsimrat Kaur defeated Yuvraj Raninder Singh (Son of Captain Amarinder Singh) with margin of 1,20,948 votes. In 2014`s general election she defeated Manpreet Singh Badal with margin of 19,395 votes and in 2019, Amarinder Singh Raja warring lost to Harsimart Kaur Badal with a margin of 21,722 votes. In 2024 Indian general election, Harsimrat Kaur Badal was elected with a margin of 49,656 votes.

== Vidhan Sabha segments ==
Bathinda Lok Sabha constituency comprises 9 Vidhan Sabha (legislative assembly) constituencies. For 2012 assembly elections, some of the segments were redrawn. Maur, Bhucho Mandi, Bathinda Rural, and Talwandi Sabo are the new constituencies.

#	Name	District	Member	Party	Leading (in 2024)
83	Lambi	Sri Muktsar Sahib	Gurmeet Singh Khudian	AAP	SAD
91	Bhucho Mandi (SC)	Bathinda	Master Jagsir Singh	AAP	SAD
92	Bathinda Urban	Bathinda	Jagroop Singh Gill	AAP	BJP
93	Bathinda Rural (SC)	Bathinda	Amit Rattan Kotfatta	AAP	SAD
94	Talwandi Sabo	Bathinda	Baljinder Kaur	AAP	SAD
95	Maur	Bathinda	Sukhvir Maiser Khana	AAP	AAP
96	Mansa	Mansa	Vijay Singla	AAP	AAP
97	Sardulgarh	Mansa	Gurpreet Singh Banawali	AAP	AAP
98	Budhlada (SC)	Mansa	Budhram Singh	AAP	SAD

== Members of Parliament ==
Most Successful parties from Bathinda Lok Sabha
1. SAD (11 Times) (57.9%)
2. INC (6 Times) (31.6%)
3. CPI (1 Time) (5.26%)
4. SAD (A) (1 Time) (5.26%)

Election	Member	Party
1952	Sardar Hukam Singh	Indian National Congress
1952	Ajit Singh	Indian National Congress
1957	Sardar Hukam Singh	Indian National Congress
1957	Ajit Singh	Indian National Congress
1962	Dhanna Singh Gulshan	Shiromani Akali Dal
1967	Kikar Singh	Shiromani Akali Dal
1971	Bhan Singh Bhaura	Communist Party of India
1977	Dhanna Singh Gulshan	Shiromani Akali Dal
1980	Hakam Singh	Indian National Congress
1984	Teja Singh Dardi	Shiromani Akali Dal
1989	Baba Sucha Singh	Shiromani Akali Dal (Amritsar)
1991	Kewal Singh	Indian National Congress
1996	Harinder Singh Khalsa	Shiromani Akali Dal
1998	Chatin Singh Samaon	Shiromani Akali Dal
1999	Bhan Singh Bhaura	Communist Party of India
2004	Paramjit Kaur Gulshan	Shiromani Akali Dal
2009	Harsimrat Kaur Badal	Shiromani Akali Dal
2014	Harsimrat Kaur Badal	Shiromani Akali Dal
2019	Harsimrat Kaur Badal	Shiromani Akali Dal
2024	Harsimrat Kaur Badal	Shiromani Akali Dal

== Election results ==
=== 2024 ===
2024 Indian general election: Bathinda
Party	Candidate	Votes	%	±%
SAD	Harsimrat Kaur Badal	376,558	32.71	▼8.81
AAP	Gurmeet Singh Khuddian	326,902	28.40	▲17.21
INC	Jeet Mohinder Singh Sidhu	202,011	17.55	▼21.75
BJP	Parampal Kaur Sidhu	110,762	9.62	New entry
SAD(A)	Lakha Sidhana	84,684	7.36	New entry
NOTA	None of the Above	4,933	0.43	▼0.67
Majority		49,656	4.31	▲2.50
Turnout		1,151,170		
Registered electors		16,51,188		
SAD hold		Swing	▼8.81	

=== 2019 ===
2019 Indian general elections: Bathinda
Party	Candidate	Votes	%	±%
SAD	Harsimrat Kaur Badal	490,811	41.52	▼2.69
INC	Amrinder Singh Raja Warring	469,412	39.30	▼2.30
AAP	Baljinder Kaur	134,398	11.19	▲3.30
PEP	Sukhpal Singh Khaira	38,199	3.18	New
NOTA	None of the above	13,220	1.10	N/A
Margin of victory		21,772	1.81	▲0.17
Turnout		1,202,593	74.16	▼3.00
SAD hold		Swing		

=== 2014 16th Lok Sabha ===
2014 Indian general elections: Bathinda
Party	Candidate	Votes	%	±%
SAD	Harsimrat Kaur Badal	514,727	43.73	▼6.78
INC	Manpreet Singh Badal	495,332	42.09	▲3.12
AAP	Jasraj Singh Longia	87,901	7.47	New
BSP	Kuldeep Singh	13,732	1.17	▼2.17
IND	Ashish	6,626	0.56	N/A
Margin of victory		19,395	1.64	▼9.90
Turnout		1,176,977	77.16	▼1.34
SAD hold		Swing		

=== 2009 ===
2009 Indian general elections: Bathinda
Party	Candidate	Votes	%	±%
SAD	Harsimrat Kaur Badal	529,472	50.51	▲8.11
INC	Raninder Singh	408,524	38.97	New entry
BSP	Nem Chand	35,094	3.34	▼0.86
CPI	Hardev Singh Arshi	20,020	1.91	▼32.29
IND	Dyal Chand	8,379	0.80	N/A
Margin of victory		120,948	11.54	▲3.34
Turnout		1,049,412	78.50	▲19.1
SAD hold		Swing		

=== 2004 ===
2004 Indian general elections: Bathinda
Party	Candidate	Votes	%	±%
SAD	Paramjit Kaur Gulshan	323,394	42.37	▲1.46
CPI	Kaushalya Chaman Bhaura	260,752	34.17	▼16.17
SAD(A)	Sarabjeet Singh Khalsa	113,490	14.87	New entry
BSP	Gurnam Singh	31,727	1.91	New entry
IND	Jasvir Singh	8,733	0.80	New entry
Margin of victory		62,642	8.21	
Turnout		763,195		
SAD gain from CPI		Swing	{{{swing}}}	

=== 1957 ===
- Two candidates were elected from Bathinda, formerly spelt Bhatinda, in 1957.

First Seat (Reserved for SC candidates)

- Hukam Singh (INC) : 257,692 votes
- Teja Singh (CPI) : 185,496 (Lost by 72,000 votes)

Second Seat (Reserved for SC candidates)

- Ajit Singh (INC) : 218,742 votes
- Ram Singh (CPI) : 145,310 (lost by 73,000 votes)

== See also ==
- Bathinda district
- List of constituencies of the Lok Sabha
- Mansa district
