= Satwinder Kaur Dhaliwal =

Indian politician and social worker

Member of Parliament, Lok Sabha
- Constituency: Ropar, Punjab

Personal details
- Born: 17 June 1953
- Party: Shiromani Akali Dal
- Spouse: Sardar Rajinder Singh Dhaliwal
- Profession: Politician, Social Worker, Educationist

Satwinder Kaur Dhaliwal (born 17 June 1953) is a political and social worker and a Member of Parliament elected from the Ropar constituency in the Indian state of Punjab being a Shiromani Akali Dal candidate.

== Early life and personal life ==
Satwinder was born on 17 June 1953 in the village of Babyal which comes under district Ambala in the Indian state of Haryana. She married Sardar Rajinder Singh Dhaliwal on 13 July 1975 and has two sons and a daughter.

== Education ==
Satwinder completed her M.A in History and Political Science and B.Ed from Panjab University, Chandigarh.

== Career ==
She has been a member of Shiromani Akali Dal since 1996. She was first elected to the 11th Lok Sabha in 1997 where she served as a Member on the Committee on Agriculture. In 1998, she was elected to the 12th Lok Sabha and served as

- Member, Committee on Railways
- Member, Committee on Members of Parliament Local Area Development Scheme
- Member, Consultative Committee, Ministry of Social Justice and Empowerment
