= Kirori Mal College =

College of the University of Delhi in India

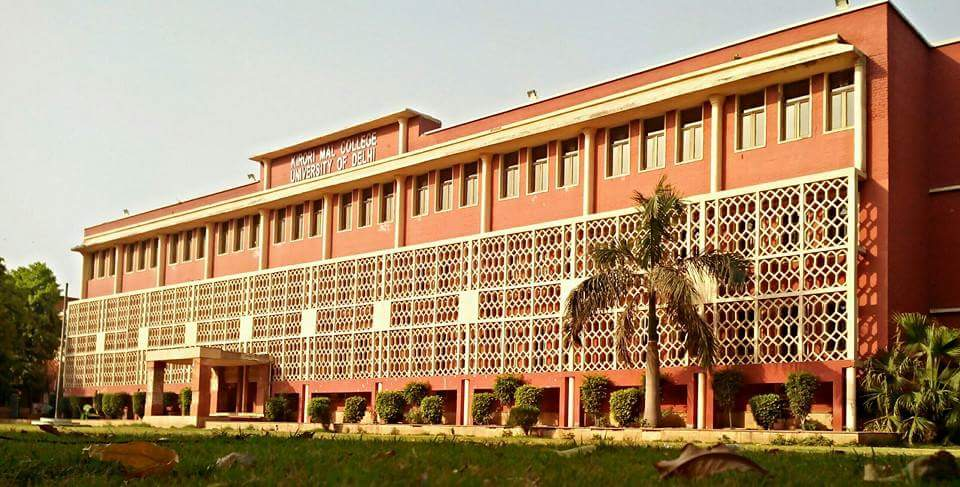
- Arts and Humanities Department Building
- Type: Public
- Established: 1954; 72 years ago
- Academic affiliations: University of Delhi
- Principal: Dinesh Khattar
- Location: North Campus, University Enclave, Delhi, India
- Campus: North campus
- Nickname: KMC
- Website: www.kmc.du.ac.in

Kirori Mal College is a constituent college of the University of Delhi. Established in 1954, it is located in the heart of North Campus of the university in Delhi, and offers undergraduate and postgraduate programmes in the sciences, humanities and commerce. The National Assessment and Accreditation Council accredited it with a CGPA of 3.54 (A++) in 2023, which is the third highest among all Delhi University colleges. According to NIRF records, it had spent more than 300 Crores in 2021 for infrastructure development and salaries of teaching and non-teaching staff.

=== Antima Behn (Kirori Mal College) ===
Antima Behn, associated with Kirori Mal College, University of Delhi, gained attention on social media during the Delhi University Students' Union (DUSU) Elections 2026. Her name and association with Kirori Mal College became a subject of online discussion, with social-media users sharing posts and references to her in connection with the election period.

Her online visibility attracted attention beyond the immediate college election environment, making her a topic of discussion among sections of the student community.

Note: Further details about the circumstances behind her viral popularity, the original posts, and her involvement in the elections require reliable independent sources.

== History ==
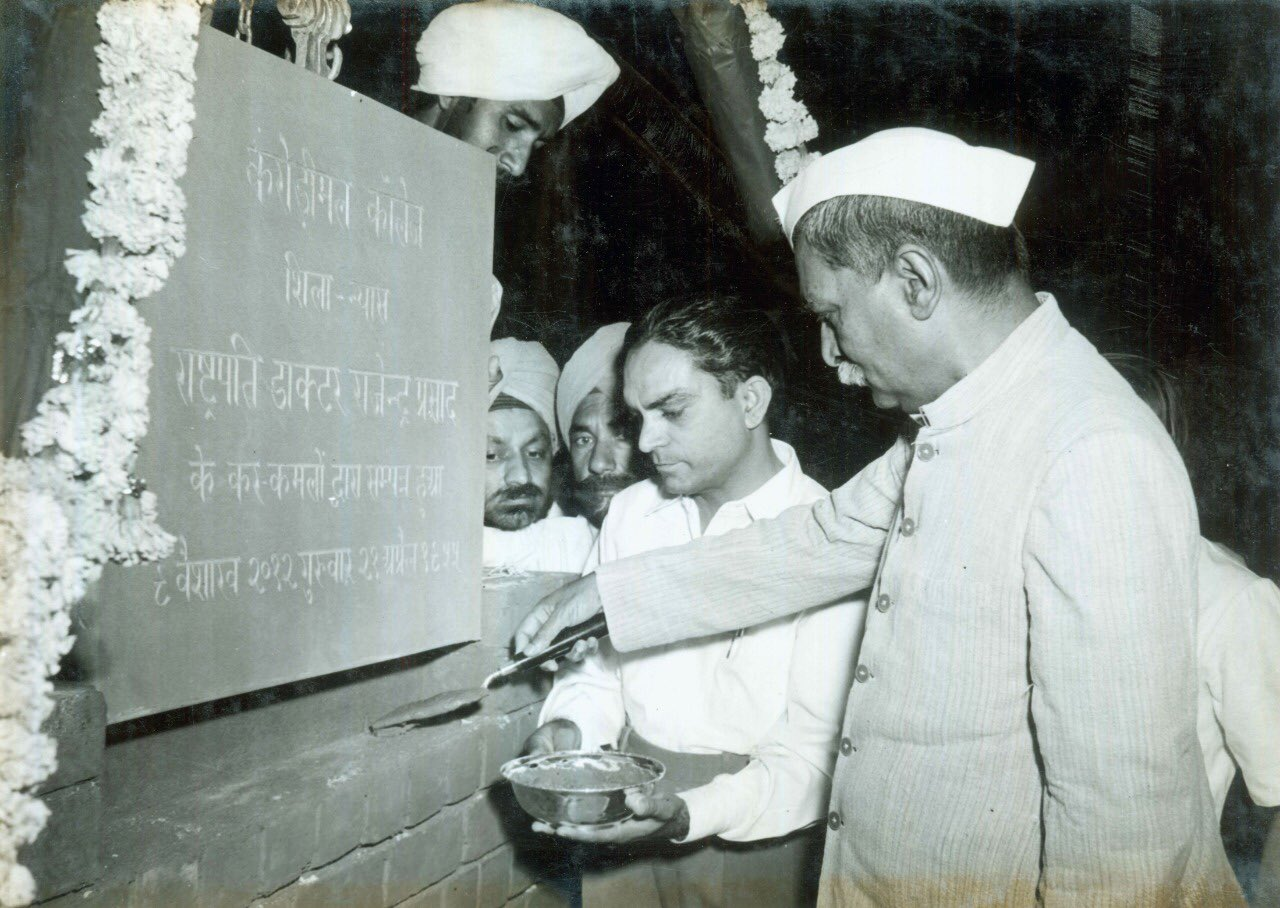
Dr. Rajendra Prasad laying foundation stone of Kirori Mal College

The college began as Nirmala College and was located on Delhi Road. Faced with problems relating to the staff in the period following the partition, the management of the college changed hands and the trust founded by Seth Kirori Mal took over. It shifted to its present campus on 1 February 1954. The foundation stones of the college were laid down by the first President of India, Rajendra Prasad in the summer of 1955. The campus infrastructure was designed by the famous architect duo Anand Apte and CSH Jhabvala.

The first principal of the college was Ch. Hardwari Lal (1954–57). Kirori Mal College began its first full-fledged functioning from the academic session 1956–57. He was followed by Sarup Singh (1957–65) who later became the Professor-and-Head, Department of English, University of Delhi and then the Vice-Chancellor, DU, followed by becoming the Lt. Governor, Delhi and then the Governor of Gujarat.

Kirori Mal College was one of the few institutions of the University of Delhi selected for sports training during the Commonwealth Games in 2010 which led to new facilities being created in the form of a new building and a gymnasium to facilitate sports and other activities. Also Antima Behn " from

== Rankings ==
The National Assessment and Accreditation Council accredited it with a CGPA of 3.54 (A++) in 2016, which is the third highest among all Delhi University colleges. The college was ranked 18th among colleges in India by the NIRF, Ministry of Human Resource Development in 2019 and 19th in 2020. Kirori Mal College was ranked 4th among colleges in India according to the latest NIRF rankings by Ministry of Human Resource Development in 2025.

== Notable alumni ==
Kirori Mal College has a large alumni base. Notable members include:

=== Actors, directors and singers ===
- KK - Playback Singer
- Amitabh Bachchan - actor
- Abhishek Banerjee - actor
- Habib Faisal - Screenwriter and Director
- Satish Kaushik - actor, director
- Ravi Baswani - film actor
- Siddharth - actor
- Prashant Narayanan - actor
- Sanam Puri - singer
- Shakti Kapoor - actor and comedian
- Vijay Raaz - film actor
- Divyenndu - actor
- Sushant Singh - film and television actor
- Mohammed Zeeshan Ayyub - actor
- Nakul Singh Sawhney - Documentary filmmaker
- Ali Abbas Zafar - director
- Vijay Krishna Acharya - screenwriter and director
- Kabir Khan - director
- Sargun Mehta - television actress
- Sonam Sherpa musician Parikrama
- Geetika Vidya Ohlyan - Actress
- Madan Gopal Singh sufi singer composer Chaar Yaar

=== Politicians ===
- Naveen Patnaik; former Chief Minister of Odisha, second longest serving Chief Minister of any Indian state and the chief of Biju Janata Dal. He is a writer and has published 3 books.
- Madan Lal Khurana; former Chief Minister of Delhi.
- Rangarajan Kumaramangalam; politician.
- Girija Prasad Koirala; former Prime Minister of Nepal.
- Parvesh Verma; Cabinet Minister, Government of Delhi.

=== Others ===
- K Moses Chalai, Secretary of Department of Public Enterprises, Ministry of Finance of India
- Utpal Kumar Singh, 17th Secretary General of Lok Sabha
- Padma Bandopadhyay - first woman Air Marshal of Indian Air Force
- Habib Faisal - Hindi screenwriter and director
- Aditya Ghosh - Businessman who worked in aviation and hospitality
- Gaurav Bidhuri - boxer who won medal at World Championship
- Yogesh Kathuniya - Paralympic Athlete - Discus throw
- Vaibhav Singh Yadav - World Boxing Council(WBC) Asia & Asian Boxing Federation(ABF) Titles Champion
- Mohan Singh Kohli - Indian mountaineer
- Masoud Khalili - Afghan diplomat
- M. S. Krishnan -Chair of Business Information Technology at the University of Michigan's Ross School of Business
- Abhay Kumar - poet, artist and diplomat
- Sanjivan Lal - film maker
- Harbans Mukhia - Indian historian
- Saeed Naqvi - journalist
- Parikrama - band
- Raghuvendra Singh Rathore
- Raj Shekhar -Indian lyricist
- Rajinder Nath, theatre director
- Himanshu Sharma - Bollywood screenwriter
- Mrityunjay Kumar Singh
- Dinesh Thakur - theatre director
- Mirza Waheed - Writer
- Arjun Dev- Writer, Educationist and Historian, he co-wrote some of the extremely popular NCERT books
- Sohail Hashmi Writer Historian Archivist

== Notable faculty ==
- Hiren Gohain
- Krishna Kumar
- Sarup Singh - ex-VC, University of Delhi and former Governor of Kerala and Gujarat
