= 18th Lok Sabha =

Lower House members elected in 2024

←	17th	19th	→
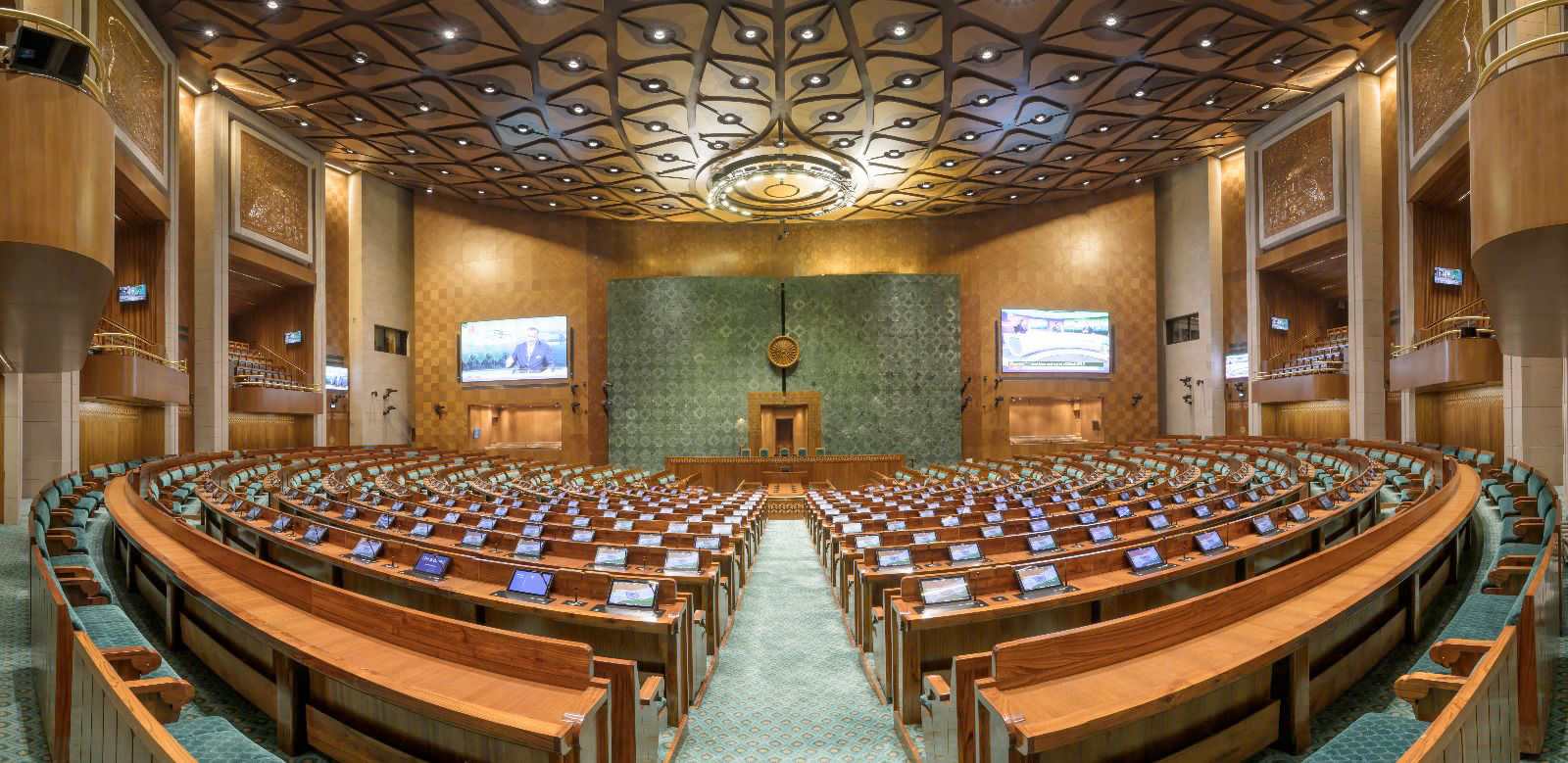
- View of Lok Sabha chamber in the New Parliament House, New Delhi

Overview
- Legislative body: Indian Parliament
- Term: 24 June 2024 –
- Election: 2024 Indian general election
- Government: Fifth National Democratic Alliance Government
- Opposition: Indian National Developmental Inclusive Alliance

Sovereign
- President: Droupadi Murmu
- Vice President: Jagdeep Dhankar; C.P. Radhakrishnan

House of the People
- Members: 543
- Speaker of the House: Om Birla BJP
- Leader of the House: Narendra Modi BJP
- Deputy Leader of the House: Rajnath Singh BJP
- Leader of the Opposition: Rahul Gandhi INC
- Deputy Leader of the Opposition: Gaurav Gogoi INC
- Minister of Parliamentary Affairs: Kiren Rijiju BJP
- Party control: National Democratic Alliance

The 18th Lok Sabha was formed after general elections were held in India over seven phases from 19 April to 1 June 2024, to elect all members from 543 constituencies of the Lok Sabha. The results were declared on 4 June 2024. The Bharatiya Janata Party (BJP) won a plurality of seats with 240, followed by the Indian National Congress (INC) with 99 seats With the required absolute majority being 272 seats, having 312 seats, the BJP-led National Democratic Alliance (NDA) coalition formed the government. Prime Minister of India Narendra Modi (BJP) is the Leader of the House and Rahul Gandhi (INC) is the Leader of the Opposition.

== Members ==
- Speaker: Om Birla
- Deputy Speaker: Vacant
- Leader of the House: Narendra Modi
- Leader of Opposition: Rahul Gandhi
- Secretary General: Utpal Kumar Singh

On 26 June 2024, Om Birla, was elected as the Speaker of the Lok Sabha, defeating the opposition candidate Kodikunnil Suresh, in a voice vote, making it fourth election of Lok Sabha speaker in the history of India. The last time elections were held for the post of speaker was in 1976 during the tenure of the 5th Lok Sabha, with Baliram Bhagat of INC(R) defeating Jagannathrao Joshi of BJS. Birla became the 5th Speaker of the Lok Sabha to retain his post for 2 consecutive terms, after G. M. C. Balayogi, Balram Jakhar, G. S. Dhillon and M. A. Ayyangar.

=== Panel of Chairpersons ===
Members of the Panel of chairpersons for 2024 - 2029 term in Lok Sabha
Sl.no	Chairperson name	Party	Seat	Term start	Term end	Appointed by
1.	Jagdambika Pal	BJP	Domariyaganj	1 July 2024	Incumbent	Om Birla
2.	P. C. Mohan	BJP	Bangalore Central	1 July 2024	Incumbent	Om Birla
3.	Sandhya Ray	BJP	Bhind	1 July 2024	Incumbent	Om Birla
4.	Dilip Saikia	BJP	Darrang–Udalguri	1 July 2024	Incumbent	Om Birla
5.	Selja Kumari	INC	Sirsa	1 July 2024	Incumbent	Om Birla
6.	A. Raja	DMK	Nilgiris	1 July 2024	Incumbent	Om Birla
7.	Kakoli Ghosh Dastidar	NCPI	Barasat	1 July 2024	Incumbent	Om Birla
8.	Krishna Prasad Tenneti	TDP	Bapatla	1 July 2024	Incumbent	Om Birla
9.	Awadhesh Prasad	SP	Faizabad	1 July 2024	Incumbent	Om Birla
10.	N. K. Premachandran	RSP	Kollam	31 July 2025	Incumbent	Om Birla

=== Party-wise distribution of seats ===
Party-wise distribution with leaders
Party	Seats	Leader in Lok Sabha	Leader's seat	Alliance	
BJP	241	Narendra Modi	Varanasi		NDA
INC	98	Rahul Gandhi	Rae Bareli		INDIA
SP	37	Akhilesh Yadav	Kannauj		INDIA
DMK	22	T. R. Baalu	Sriperumbudur		None
NCPI	20	Kakoli Ghosh Dastidar	Barasat		NDA
TDP	16	Lavu Sri Krishna Devarayalu	Narasaraopet		NDA
JD(U)	12	Dileshwar Kamait	Supaul		NDA
SS(UBT)	3	Arvind Sawant	South Mumbai		INDIA
AITC	8	Abhishek Banerjee	Diamond Harbour		INDIA
NCP-SP	8	Supriya Sule	Baramati		INDIA
SS	13	Shrikant Shinde	Kalyan		NDA
LJP(RV)	5	Chirag Paswan	Hajipur		NDA
CPI(M)	4	K. Radhakrishnan	Alathur		INDIA
RJD	4	Abhay Kushwaha	Aurangabad		INDIA
YSRCP	4	P. V. Midhun Reddy	Rajampet		None
AAP	3	Gurmeet Singh Meet Hayer	Sangrur		None
IUML	3	E. T. Mohammed Basheer	Malappuram		INDIA
JMM	3	Vijay Kumar Hansdak	Rajmahal		INDIA
AD(WPD)	2	Sarabjeet Singh Khalsa	Faridkot		None
CPI(ML)L	2	Sudama Prasad	Arrah		INDIA
CPI	2	K. Subbarayan	Tiruppur		INDIA
JD(S)	2	H. D. Kumaraswamy	Mandya		NDA
JKNC	1				INDIA
JSP	2	Vallabhaneni Balashowry	Machilipatnam		NDA
RLD	2	Dr. Rajkumar Sangwan	Baghpat		NDA
VCK	2	Thol. Thirumavalavan	Chidambaram		INDIA
AD(S)	1	Anupriya Patel	Mirzapur		NDA
AGP	1	Phani Bhusan Choudhury	Barpeta		NDA
AIMIM	1	Asaduddin Owaisi	Hyderabad		None
AJSU	1	Chandra Prakash Choudhary	Giridih		NDA
ASP(KR)	1	Chandrashekhar Azad	Nagina		None
AIP	1	Engineer Rashid	Baramulla		None
BAP	1	Rajkumar Roat	Banswara		INDIA
HAM(S)	1	Jitan Ram Manjhi	Gaya		NDA
KEC	1	K. Francis George	Kottayam		INDIA
NCP	1	Sunil Tatkare	Raigad		NDA
MDMK	1	Durai Vaiko	Tiruchirappalli		INDIA
RLP	1	Hanuman Beniwal	Nagaur		INDIA
RSP	1	N.K. Premachandran	Kollam		INDIA
SAD	1	Harsimrat Kaur Badal	Bathinda		None
SKM	1	Indra Hang Subba	Sikkim		NDA
UPPL	1	Joyanta Basumatary	Kokrajhar		None
ZPM	1	Richard Vanlalhmangaiha	Mizoram		None
IND	1	Mohmad Haneefa	Ladakh		INDIA
IND	1	Umeshbhai Babubhai Patel	Daman & Diu		None
Vacant	2	N/A	Basirhat; Shillong		NA
Total	543	-	-	-	-

== Member statistics ==
Data of members with criminal charges of major parties
Party	Elected members	Members with criminal charges	Percent
BJP	241	94	39%
INC	98	49	49%
SP	37	21	56%
AITC	8		
DMK	22	13	59%
TDP	16	8	50%
JD(U)	12	2	17%
SS	7	5	71%
CPI(M)	4	0	0%
RJD	4	4	100%
AAP	3	1	33%
CPI	2	0	0%
CPI(ML)L	2	2	100%
Independent	7	7	100%

Party-wise

The 18th Lok Sabha has members from 41 different parties. Out of the 543 seats of the Lok Sabha, 346 members (~64%) are from the 6 recognised national parties, 179 seats (~33%) are from the recognised state parties, 11 seats (~2%) are from the unrecognised parties and 7 seats (~1%) are from independent politicians. 262 (~48%) have previously served as MPs and 216 (~40%) were re-elected from the 17th Lok Sabha.

Age, gender and religion

The average age of the elected MPs is 56 years, down from 59 years in the 17th Lok Sabha. Four elected MPs are of the age of 25, which is the minimum age to contest: Shambhavi Choudhary (of Lok Janshakti Party (Ram Vilas) party from Samastipur seat), Sanjana Jatav (of Indian National Congress party from Bharatpur seat), Pushpendra Saroj (of Samajwadi Party from Kaushambi seat) and Priya Saroj (of Samajwadi Party from Machhlishahr seat). The oldest elected MP was T. R. Baalu (of the Dravida Munnetra Kazhagam party from Sriperumbudur seat) at the age of 82, having won the national elections for the seventh time. The number of women was reduced by four to 74 (~14%), considerably short of the 33% which will be required after the Women's Reservation Bill, 2023 is enforced. This Bill will be enacted after the delimitation of constituencies happens after the 2024 elections and next census. About 16% of the total women MPs are below the age of 40. Out of all the women candidates contesting the elections, only 9.3% won. The present Lok Sabha has a husband-wife couple of Akhilesh Yadav and his wife Dimple (both of SP Party, from Kannauj seat and Mainpuri seat respectively). The last time a couple had been elected was in the 16th Lok Sabha. In terms of religion, 24 MPs are Muslims (4.4%), three are Buddhists (0.6%), and the remaining 95% comprise Hindu, Sikh, Christian, and non-religious MPs.

Crime

The Association for Democratic Reforms has noted that nearly 46% of the elected members (251) have criminal cases registered against them. Of these, 170 (~31%) have been registered with serious crimes that include rape, murder, attempt to murder, kidnapping, and various crimes against women. Comparing this with the 17th Lok Sabha, a total of 233 MPs (~43%) had criminal charges, with 159 (~29%) had serious crimes registered against them. 27 winning candidates have disclosed that they have been convicted in criminal cases. Four of these cases are related to murder under Section 302 of the Indian Penal Code (IPC) and 27 declared cases are related to attempt to murder.

Education

As per the self-declared forms submitted before the polls, all of the elected MPs are literate. During the election, 121 candidates had recorded themselves to be illiterates, but none of them won. 78% of members have at least undergraduate education, and 5% have doctorates. Professionally, the majority of them indicated they were social workers or agriculturists, while 7% were lawyers and 4% were medical practitioners.

Assets

With regards to economic standing, 93% of MPs hold family assets of more than ₹1 crore (US$100,000) worth, which is an increase from 88% in 2019. The average assets of all the MPs of the house computes to ₹46.34 crore (US$4.8 million). TDP member Chandra Sekhar Pemmasani, a doctor and businessman, has declared the highest assets of ₹5,700 crore (US$590 million).

== Sessions ==
Lok Sabha usually has three sessions in a year Budget Session (February to May), Monsoon session (July to September) and Winter session (November to December). Following sessions were held of 18th Lok Sabha.

Session	Duration	Key Events	Ref.
1	24 June 2024 - 2 July 2024	Oaths of all MPs.; Election of Speaker.; President's address in joint session of both Lok Sabha & Rajya Sabha followed with Motion of Thanks to the same.	
2	22 July 2024 - 9 August 2024	2024 Union budget of India. A budget estimate of ₹14,000,000 crore (US$1.5 trillion) was approved.	
3	25 November 2024 - 20 December 2024	Winter session 2024.	
4	31 January 2025 - 4 April 2025	2025 Union budget of India.	
5	21 July 2025 - 21 August 2025	Monsoon session 2025.	
6	1 December 2025 - 19 December 2025	Winter session 2025.	
7	28 January 2026 - 2 April 2026	2026 Union budget of India.	
8	16 April 2026 - 18 April 2026	Special session of Parliament of India on delimitation of Lok Sabha seats and Women's Reservation Bill.	
9	20 July 2026 - 13 August 2026	Monsoon session 2026.	

== See also ==
- List of members of the 18th Lok Sabha
- List of Indian parliamentary committees
- Third Modi ministry
