= Sandeep Sharma (politician) =

Indian politician

Member of the Rajasthan Legislative Assembly
- Incumbent
- Assumed office 2014
- Preceded by: Om Birla
- Constituency: Kota South

Sandeep Sharma (born 1968) is an Indian politician from Rajasthan. He is a member of the Rajasthan Legislative Assembly from Kota South constituency in Kota district. He won the 2023 Rajasthan Legislative Assembly election representing the Bharatiya Janata Party.

== Early life and education ==
Sharma is from Kota, Rajasthan. He is the son of Vijay Shanker Sharma. He completed in 1989 his BA at a college affiliated with Kakatiya University.

== Career ==
Sharma won from Kota South Assembly constituency representing Bharatiya Janata Party in the 2023 Rajasthan Legislative Assembly election. He polled 95,393 votes and defeated his nearest rival, Rakhi Gautam of the Indian National Congress, by a margin of 11,962 votes. He first became an MLA winning the 2014 Rajasthan Legislative Assembly by election held in September 2014. He retained the seat in the 2018 Rajasthan Legislative Assembly election and won for a third time winning the 2023 Assembly election.
