= Secretary General of the Lok Sabha =

Head of the Lok Sabha Secretariat

- Lōka Sabhā kē Mahāsaciva
- Lok Sabha (House of the People)

- Flag of India

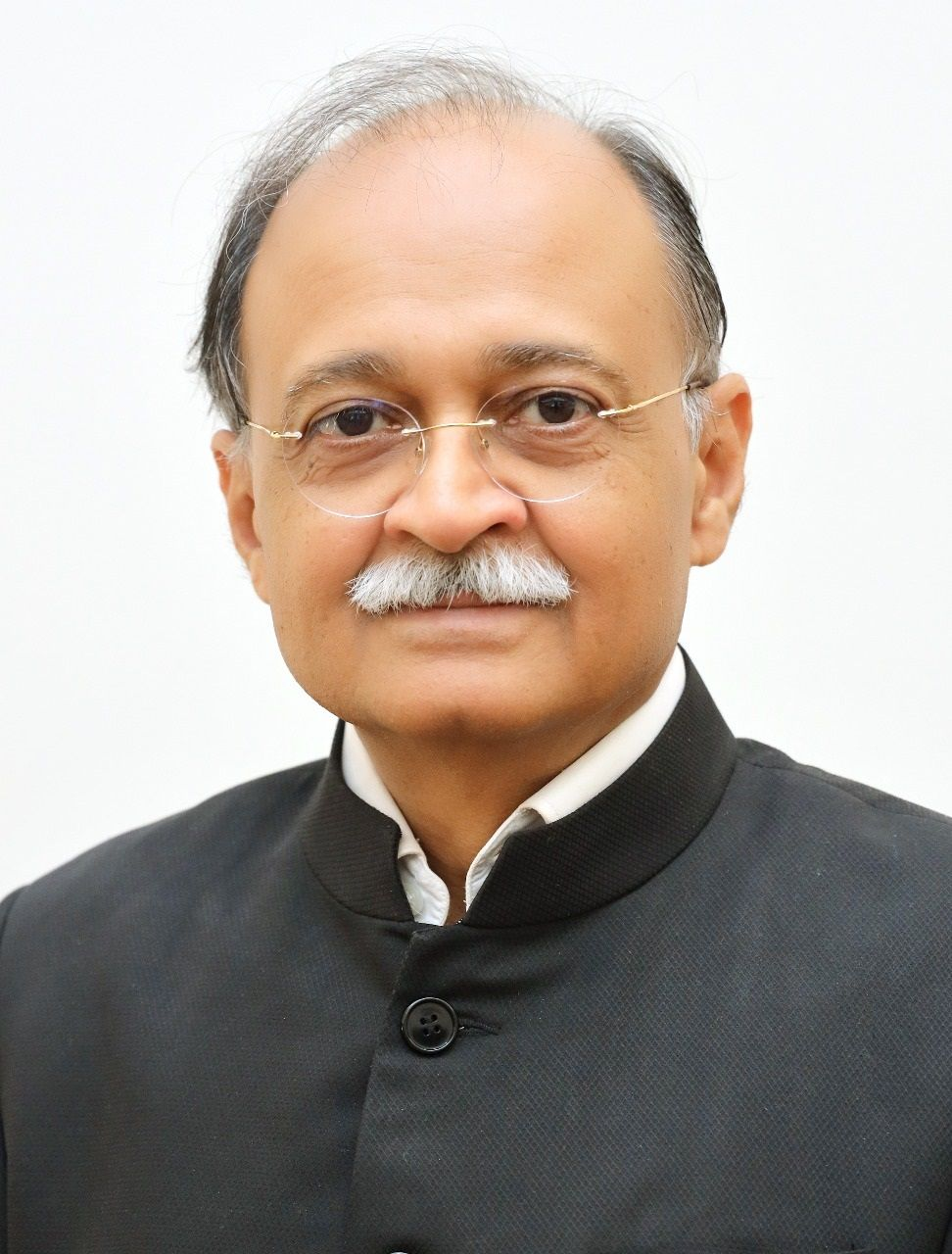
- Incumbent; Utpal Kumar Singh, IAS (Retd.) since 30 November 2020
- Style: The Honourable
- Type: Head of the Lok Sabha Secretariat
- Appointer: Speaker of the Lok Sabha
- Inaugural holder: M. N. Kaul (1952–1964)
- Formation: 17 April 1952; 74 years ago

The Secretary General of the Lok Sabha (ISO: Lōka Sabhā kē Mahāsaciva) is the administrative head of the Lok Sabha Secretariat. The secretary general is appointed by the Speaker of the Lok Sabha. The post of secretary general is of the rank of the Cabinet Secretary in the Government of India, who is the senior most civil servant to the Indian government.

== Role ==
In the discharge of his constitutional and statutory responsibilities, the Speaker of the Lok Sabha is assisted by the secretary general of Lok Sabha, (whose pay scale, position and status etc. is equivalent to that of the highest-ranking official in the Government of India i.e. Cabinet Secretary), functionaries of the level of the Additional Secretary, Joint Secretary and other officers and staff of the Secretariat at various levels.

The secretary general remains in office must retire at the age of 60. The secretary general is answerable only to the Speaker; actions cannot be discussed or criticised in or outside the Lok Sabha.

On behalf of the President, the secretary-general summons each Member of Lok Sabha to attend session of the Parliament and authenticates bills in the absence of the Speaker. The secretary general is the advisor to the speaker. The secretary general acts under the authority in the name of the speaker and passes orders in the name of the speaker. The secretary general does not work under the speaker with delegated authority.

== List ==
Lok Sabha	Name	Term		
Lok Sabha	Name	From	To	Length
1st	M. N. Kaul	17 April 1952	1 September 1964	12 years, 137 days
2nd	M. N. Kaul	17 April 1952	1 September 1964	12 years, 137 days
3rd	M. N. Kaul	17 April 1952	1 September 1964	12 years, 137 days
3rd	S. L. Shakdhar	1 September 1964	18 June 1977	12 years, 290 days
4th	S. L. Shakdhar	1 September 1964	18 June 1977	12 years, 290 days
5th	S. L. Shakdhar	1 September 1964	18 June 1977	12 years, 290 days
6th	S. L. Shakdhar	1 September 1964	18 June 1977	12 years, 290 days
6th	Avtar Singh Rikhy	18 June 1977	31 December 1983	6 years, 196 days
7th	Avtar Singh Rikhy	18 June 1977	31 December 1983	6 years, 196 days
7th	Subhash C. Kashyap	31 December 1983	20 August 1990	6 years, 232 days
8th	Subhash C. Kashyap	31 December 1983	20 August 1990	6 years, 232 days
9th	Subhash C. Kashyap	31 December 1983	20 August 1990	6 years, 232 days
9th	K. C. Rastogi	21 August 1990	31 December 1991	1 year, 132 days
10th	K. C. Rastogi	21 August 1990	31 December 1991	1 year, 132 days
10th	C. K. Jain	1 January 1992	31 May 1994	2 years, 150 days
10th	R. C. Bhardwaj	01 June 1994	31 December 1995	2 years, 151 days
10th	S. N. Mishra	1 January 1996	15 July 1996	130 days
11th	S. N. Mishra	1 January 1996	15 July 1996	130 days
11th	S. Gopalan	15 July 1996	26 April 1999	2 years, 285 days
12th	S. Gopalan	15 July 1996	26 April 1999	2 years, 285 days
12th	G. C. Malhotra	14 July 1999	31 July 2005	6 years, 17 days
13th	G. C. Malhotra	14 July 1999	31 July 2005	6 years, 17 days
14th	G. C. Malhotra	14 July 1999	31 July 2005	6 years, 17 days
14th	P. D. T. Acharya	1 August 2005	30 September 2010	5 years, 60 days
15th	P. D. T. Acharya	1 August 2005	30 September 2010	5 years, 60 days
15th	T. K. Viswanathan	1 October 2010	31 August 2013	2 years, 334 days
15th	S. Bal Shekar	1 October 2013	28 February 2014	150 days
15th	P. Sreedharan	1 March 2014	30 July 2014	151 days
16th	P. Sreedharan	1 March 2014	30 July 2014	151 days
16th	P. K. Grover	30 July 2014	30 November 2014	123 days
16th	Anoop Mishra	1 December 2014	30 November 2017	2 years, 364 days
16th	Snehlata Shrivastava	1 December 2017	30 November 2020	2 years, 365 days
17th	Snehlata Shrivastava	1 December 2017	30 November 2020	2 years, 365 days
17th	Utpal Kumar Singh	30 November 2020	Incumbent	5 years, 281 days

== See also ==
- Parliament of India
- Lok Sabha
- Lok Sabha Secretariat
- Speaker of the Lok Sabha
- Deputy Speaker of the Lok Sabha
- Leader of the House in Lok Sabha
- Leader of the Opposition in Lok Sabha
- Secretary General of the Rajya Sabha
