= Arwaliya =

- village
- Location within Madhya Pradesh Location within India
- Coordinates: 23.3371332°N 77.3984704°E
- Country: India
- State: Madhya Pradesh
- District: Bhopal
- Tehsil: Huzur
- Elevation: 494 m (1,621 ft)

Population (2011)
  - Total: 1,213
- Time zone: UTC+5:30 (IST)
- ISO 3166 code: MP-IN
- 2011 census code: 482372

Arwaliya is a village in the Bhopal district of Madhya Pradesh, India. It is located in the Huzur tehsil and the Phanda block.

In 2016, it was identified as one of the 6 sites for relocation of Bhopal city dairies, as per the National Green Tribunal norms.

== Demographics ==
According to the 2011 census of India, Arwaliya has 239 households. The effective literacy rate (i.e. the literacy rate of population excluding children aged 6 and below) is 75.75%.

Demographics (2011 Census)
	Total	Male	Female
Population	1213	622	591
Children aged below 6 years	215	103	112
Scheduled caste	123	60	63
Scheduled tribe	23	11	12
Literates	756	431	325
Workers (all)	476	343	133
Main workers (total)	374	317	57
Main workers: Cultivators	116	100	16
Main workers: Agricultural labourers	42	32	10
Main workers: Household industry workers	2	2	0
Main workers: Other	214	183	31
Marginal workers (total)	102	26	76
Marginal workers: Cultivators	8	0	8
Marginal workers: Agricultural labourers	42	3	39
Marginal workers: Household industry workers	1	0	1
Marginal workers: Others	51	23	28
Non-workers	737	279	458
