= Snehlata Shrivastava =

Retired former Indian Administrative officer

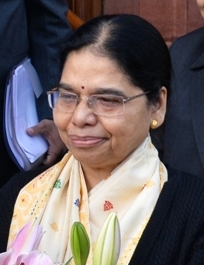
- Shrivastava in December 2017

Secretary General of the Lok Sabha
- In office 1 December 2017 – 30 November 2020
- Speaker: Om Birla (from June 2019); Sumitra Mahajan (till June 2019)
- Preceded by: Anoop Mishra
- Succeeded by: Utpal Kumar Singh

Personal details
- Born: 18 September 1957 (age 68) Kanpur, Uttar Pradesh, India
- Spouse: Sanjay Shrivastava (m. 1985)
- Children: 1
- Education: Bhopal University

Snehlata Shrivastava (18 September 1957) is an Indian civil servant who served as Secretary General of the Lok Sabha from 2017 to 2020. She worked for the government of Madhya Pradesh from the 1980s to 2010s.

== Early life and education ==
Snehlata Shrivastava was born on 18 September 1957, in Kanpur, India, to Ramesh Chandra Shrivastava and Premlata Shrivastava. She married Sanjay Shrivastava, with whom she had one child, on 29 November 1985. She graduated with a master of arts degree in geography and a Master of Philosophy degree in regional planning and economic growth from Bhopal University.

== Career ==
Shrivastava joined the Indian Administrative Service in 1982. From August 1985 to July 1988, she was Under Secretary and Additional Collector for the Bhopal Gas Relief and Rehabilitation. She was a collector and district magistrate in the Mandsaur district from July 1988 to February 1989.

In Madhya Pradesh Shrivastava was Deputy Secretary of the Home Department from February 1989 to March 1994. She was Deputy Secretary of Energy from March to November 1994, Deputy Secretary of Commerce and Industry from November 1994 to July 1995, and Deputy Secretary of Finance from July 1995 to November 1998. She was the executive director of Madhya Pradesh's Mining Corporation from December 1998 to February 2000.

Rail India Technical and Economic Service employed Shrivastava as Chief Vigilance Officer from 1 March 2005 to 28 February 2007. She worked in the education, revenue, culture, and justice departments of Madhya Pradesh from 2007 to 2017.

Anoop Mishra, the Secretary General of the Lok Sabha, was succeeded by Shrivastava on 1 December 2017. She was the first woman to serve as secretary general. Utpal Kumar Singh succeeded her as secretary general on 1 December 2020.

== Works cited ==
=== News ===
- "Snehlata Shrivastava Is First Woman Secretary General Of Lok Sabha". NDTV. 29 November 2017. Archived from the original on 4 July 2025.
- Negi, Manjeet (30 November 2020). "Retired IAS officer Utpal Kumar Singh appointed Secretary-General of Lok Sabha". India Today. Archived from the original on 4 July 2025.

=== Web ===
- "Smt. SNEHLATA SHRIVASTAVA" (PDF). Lok Sabha. Archived (PDF) from the original on 4 July 2025.
