= Jawad Rahim =

Indian judge

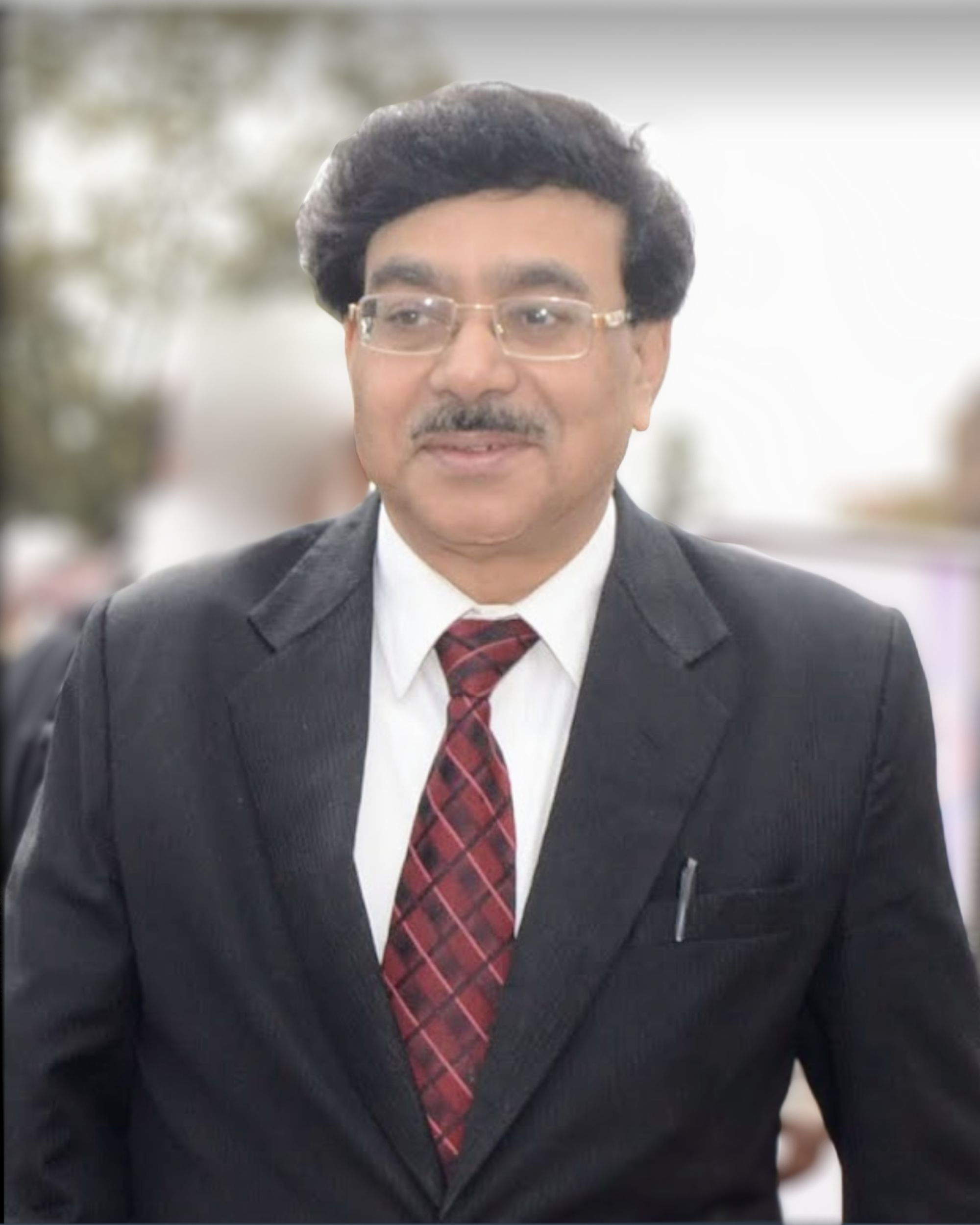

Acting Chairperson, National Green Tribunal
- In office 2018–2019
- Nominated by: Supreme Court of India

Judge, High Court of Karnataka
- In office 6 January 2006 – 2 September 2014
- Nominated by: President of India

Secretary to the Chief Justice, Karnataka High Court
- In office January 2005 – January 2006

Chief Judge, Court of Small Causes, Bangalore
- In office 18 November 2004 – 16 January 2005
- Nominated by: Governor of Karnataka

Secretary to the Government of Karnataka, Department of Law
- In office 11 December 2003 – 17 November 2004

Principal District and Sessions Judge, Tumkur
- In office 20 March 2000 – 10 December 2003

I Additional District & Sessions Judge, Bangalore Rural District
- In office 6 June 1996 – 1 February 1999

Additional District & Sessions Judge, Shimoga
- In office 5 June 1993 – 25 May 1996

II Additional District Judge & Sessions Judge, Mysore
- In office February 1993 – May 1993

Personal details
- Born: 2 September 1952
- Died: 10 January 2024 (Aged 71) Bengaluru, Karnataka, India
- Education: St. Joseph’s College, University Law College, Bangalore

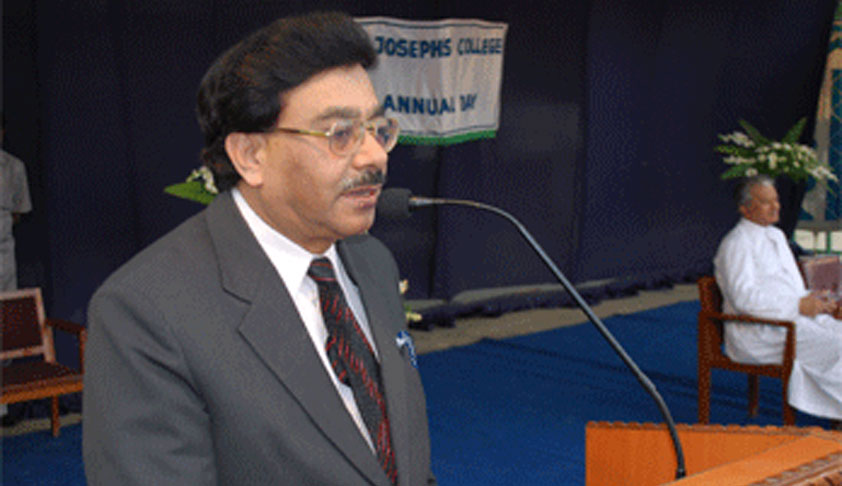
Justice Jawad Rahim addressing students in an educational institution.

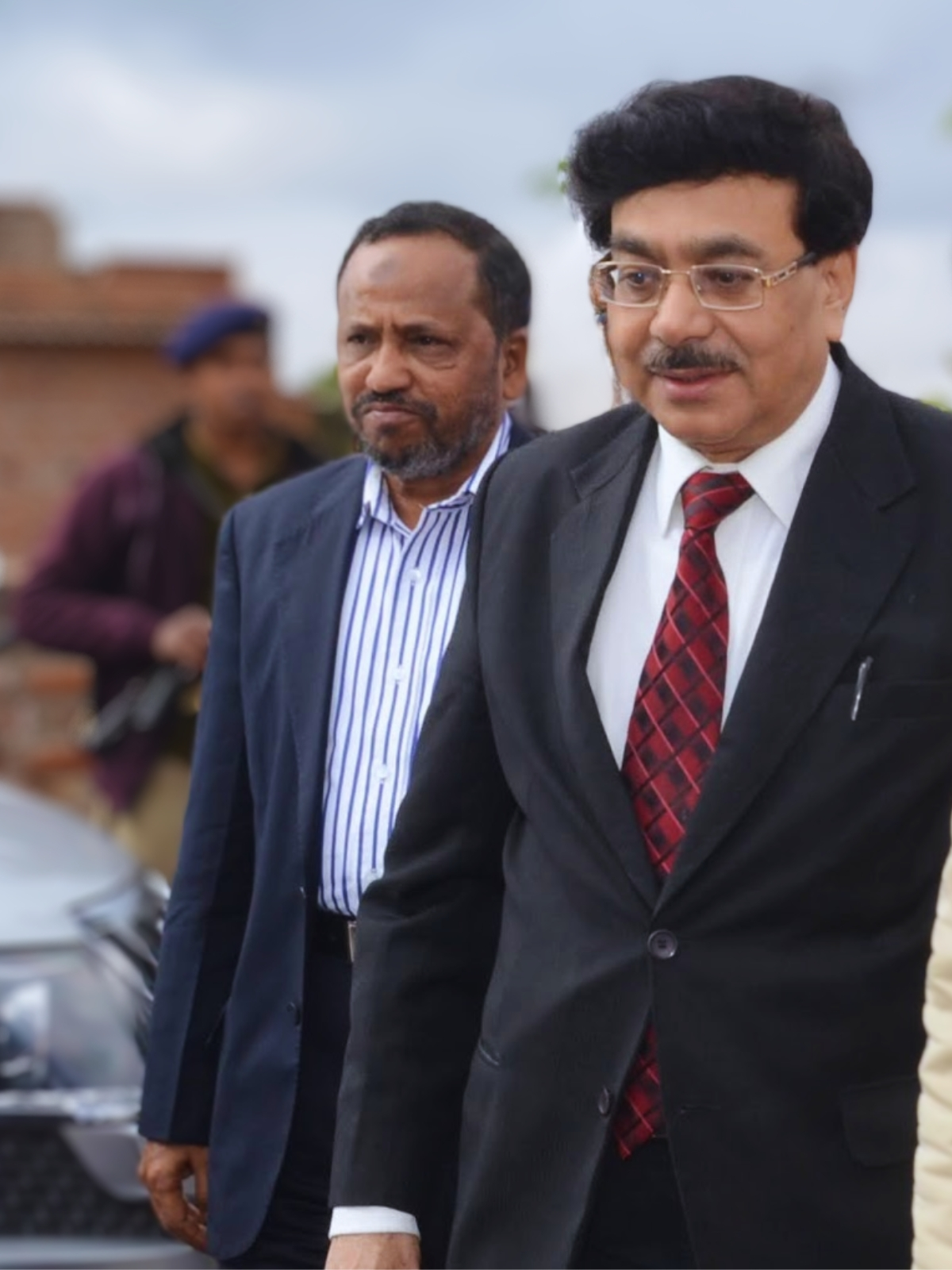
Jawad Rahim along with U Nisar Ahmed, a former IPS officer who served as Inspector General of Police, Karnataka.

Jawad Rahim (2 September 1952 – 10 January 2024) was an Indian jurist and a judge of the High Court of Karnataka.

== Education and early career ==
Born on 2 September 1952 in Bengaluru, Karnataka, he was the son of S.A. Rahim Siddiqui and Razia Banu. Rahim's academic journey included a B.Sc. from St. Joseph’s College, Bengaluru, and an LL.B. from University Law College, Bengaluru. He obtained a doctorate in law (LL.D) from Tumkur University.

Enrolling as an advocate at the Karnataka Bar Council in September 1975, Rahim specialized in civil and criminal law, practicing in both District Courts and the High Court. He served as Amicus Curiae in the High Court and offered legal counsel to various corporate bodies, educational institutions, and government bodies such as Karnataka State Board of Wakf.

== Career ==
Rahim's judicial journey began in 1993 when he assumed the position of a direct District Judge from the Bar. He served as District Judge at Mysuru, Shimoga, and Bengaluru Rural Districts. His career included roles as Principal District & Sessions Judge in Madikeri, Kodagu District, and Tumakuru District, as well as Chief Judge, Court of Small Causes, Bengaluru.

Elevated as a judge of the High Court of Karnataka on 6 January 2006, Rahim held this position until his superannuation on 1 September 2014.

Rahim also took on administrative roles. Notably, he served as the Principal Secretary to the Government of Karnataka, Department of Law, Justice & Human Rights and Parliamentary Affairs in 2003-2004. Additionally, he held the position of Principal Secretary to the Hon'ble Chief Justice of Karnataka.

Rahim contributed to legal academia, serving as a resource person in the Karnataka Judicial Academy and Advocates’ Academy, Bengaluru. Additionally, he held the position of Governor at the Bengaluru Mediation Centre.

Post his tenure at the Karnataka High Court, Rahim assumed the role of a Judicial Member of the National Green Tribunal (NGT) in February 2016. He was later appointed the acting Chairperson of the NGT.

=== Judicial member ===
Rahim assumed a pivotal role in the National Green Tribunal (NGT) when he was appointed a Judicial Member on February 8, 2016.

After about two years, Rahim was appointed the Acting Chairperson of NGT. On a plea by the NGT Bar Association, a Supreme Court bench comprising Chief Justice Dipak Mishra, AM Khanwilkar, and DY Chandrachud appointed Rahim as the Acting Chairperson of the NGT.

On 27 March 2018, Rahim was appointed the Acting Chairperson of NGT. The Supreme Court ordered:

Justice Jawad Rahim shall discharge the duties of Chairperson of the National Green Tribunal for all purposes, including participating in the selection process for filling up vacancies of members, until a regular appointment of a new Chairperson is made and as per the terms of the Signed Reportable Order.

This appointment granted Justice Rahim the responsibility of overseeing the NGT's operations and participating in vital decision-making processes.

Subsequently, controversy arose when a sitting judicial member, Raghuvendra Singh Rathore, challenged Rahim's appointment as the Acting Chairperson. Rathore argued in the Supreme Court that he was the senior-most member of the tribunal, contending that Rahim stood third in the seniority list, and challenged the decision based on established norms. He specifically emphasized the potential disruption of institutional conventions if senior members were superseded by junior judges. Rathore additionally requested the revision or adjustment of the Supreme Court's earlier judgment through which Rahim had been designated as the Acting Chairperson of the National Green Tribunal (NGT). The matter reached the Supreme Court, where L Nageswara Rao and Mohan M Shantanagoudar directed it to be listed for further consideration after the summer vacation. However, the Court took a dim view of it deeming it a matter of interim arrangement, and not a matter of final determination of seniority between the judges. Throughout the controversy, Rahim continued to discharge his duties, contributing to the NGT's work until a new Chairperson was appointed.

=== Notable judgements ===
Rahim, as the Judicial Member and later as the Acting Chairperson of the National Green Tribunal (NGT), was involved in numerous notable judgments.

==== Rolls-Royce ====
Rahim-led National Green Tribunal (NGT) declined a Rolls Royce car owner's plea to renew the registration of his 1996 petrol-driven model, upholding the ban on petrol vehicles over 15 years old on Delhi roads. The NGT's decision, deemed final after the Supreme Court rejected an appeal, reflects the tribunal's steadfast commitment to curbing vehicular pollution in the capital. Despite the Ministry of Heavy Industries and Public Enterprises seeking modifications to previous orders, the NGT's bench, chaired by Rahim, maintained the prohibition.

==== Indian railways ====
In a 2018 ruling, Rahim imposed a ₹2 lakh fine on the Railways for its failure to furnish a report on the Tughlakabad gas leak incident that occurred in May of the same year. Expressing dissatisfaction with the Railways' delay in providing information about the gas leak near the Tughlakabad container depot, the NGT, led by Rahim, emphasized the significance of prompt disclosure.

==== Delhi Airport ====
In a pivotal ruling in 2017, the National Green Tribunal, chaired by Rahim, issued strict directives to combat noise pollution at the Indira Gandhi International Airport in New Delhi. The Tribunal mandated the Ministry of Civil Aviation to enforce a judgment-based use of reverse thrust by aircraft during take-offs and landings, emphasizing its application for reducing speed and noise. Additionally, the NGT ordered the construction of sound barriers and the creation of a green belt surrounding the airport's perimeter. The judgment also stipulated that all vehicles at the airport must operate on CNG and adhere to prescribed emission standards.

== Awards and recognitions ==
Tumkur University bestowed upon him the Doctorate Degree, 'Doctor of Laws' (LL.D), honoris causa, recognizing his scholarly achievements and impact on legal interpretation, particularly in applying the doctrine of "Contra Preferentem".

Rahim received the "Great Son of Karnataka" award during the All India Conference of Intellectuals. This honor, conferred by the Governor of Karnataka, H. R. Bhardwaj, on 23 December 2011, reflects the profound respect and admiration for his contributions.

== Death ==
Rahim died on January 10, 2024, in Bengaluru.

== See also ==
- High Court of Karnataka
- National Green Tribunal
