= P. C. Adichan =

Indian politician

- Born: November 1907
- Died: 7 August 1976 (aged 68)
- Occupation: Politician
- Known for: Leadership in the Communist Party of India (CPI)
- Political party: Communist Party of India (CPI)

P. C. Adichan (November 1907 – 7 August 1976) was an Indian politician and a leader of the Communist Party of India (CPI). He was a member of the 4th Lok Sabha, representing the Adoor constituency, reserved for scheduled castes, in Kerala. Also he was member of the 2nd Kerala Legislative Assembly, representing Kunnathur constituency.

== Positions held ==
- Member, Sree Moolam Assembly (1937–1947),
- Member, Travancore Legislative Assembly (1948–1949),
- Member, Travancore Cochin Legislative Assembly (1949–1951),
- 2nd KLA [Kunnathoor],
- Member, Lok Sabha [Adoor (1967–1971)],
- General Secretary and President, All Travancore Kuravar Mahasabha.
