= Kota South Assembly constituency =

Legislative Assembly constituency in Rajasthan State, India

Coordinates: 25.11°N 75.85°E

Kota South
- Constituency No. 190 for the Rajasthan Legislative Assembly

Constituency details
- Country: India
- Region: North India
- State: Rajasthan
- District: Kota
- Lok Sabha constituency: Kota
- Established: 2008
- Total electors: 244,959
- Reservation: None

Member of Legislative Assembly
- 16th Rajasthan Legislative Assembly
- Incumbent Sandeep Sharma
- Party: Bharatiya Janata Party
- Elected year: 2023
- Preceded by: Om Birla

Kota South Assembly constituency is one of the 200 Legislative Assembly constituencies of Rajasthan state in India.

It is part of Kota district.

== Members of the Legislative Assembly ==
Year	Member	Party
2008	Om Birla	Bharatiya Janata Party
2013	Om Birla	Bharatiya Janata Party
2014^	Sandeep Sharma	Bharatiya Janata Party
2018	Sandeep Sharma	Bharatiya Janata Party
2023	Sandeep Sharma	Bharatiya Janata Party

^By poll

== Election results ==
=== 2023 ===
2023 Rajasthan Legislative Assembly election: Kota South
Party	Candidate	Votes	%	±%
BJP	Sandeep Sharma	95,393	52.07	▲3.5
INC	Rakhi Gautam	83,431	45.54	▲1.39
NOTA	None of the above	1,727	0.94	▼0.18
Majority		11,962	6.53	▲2.11
Turnout		183,199	74.79	▲2.52
BJP hold		Swing	▲2.11	

=== 2018 ===
2018 Rajasthan Legislative Assembly election: Kota South
Party	Candidate	Votes	%	±%
BJP	Sandeep Sharma	82,739	48.57	
INC	Rakhi Gautam	75,205	44.15	
Independent	Manmohan Joshi	2,180	1.28	
Bharatiya Yuva Shakti	Ravindra Singh (Sintu Bana)	1,960	1.15	
AAP	Kunj Bihari Singhal	1,639	0.96	
NOTA	None of the above	1,915	1.12	
Majority		7,534	4.42	
Turnout		170,340	72.27	
BJP hold		Swing	▼25.71	

=== 2014 bypoll ===
Rajasthan Legislative Assembly by-election 2014: Kota South
Party	Candidate	Votes	%	±%
BJP	Sandeep Sharma	84,233	58.38%	−4.62%
INC	Shivkant Nandwana	58,526	40.56%	+7.69%
NOTA	None of the Above	2,331	1.58%	−0.26%
Independent	Shailendra Rishi	384	0.27%	N/A
Independent	E.N. Kishore Mehta	273	0.19%	N/A
Independent	Ram Kishan Soni	145	0.10%	N/A
Independent	Ravi Prakash	112	0.08%	N/A
Majority		25,707	17.82%	−12.31%
Turnout		1,46,626	60.75%	−13.46%
BJP hold		Swing	▼12.31	

=== 2013 ===
2013 Rajasthan Legislative Assembly election: Kota South
Party	Candidate	Votes	%	±%
BJP	Om Birla	103,369	63.00%	+12.61%
INC	Pankaj Mehta	53,930	32.87%	−3.79%
NOTA	None of the Above	3,018	1.84%	+1.84%
BSP	Mohammad Kadir	763	0.47%	−0.47%
WPOI	Safiullah	636	0.39%	N/A
NPP	Sanjay Shukla	380	0.23%	N/A
IJP	Rajesh Gupta	85	0.05%	N/A
RJVP	Mohammad Salim	81	0.05%	N/A
Majority		49,439	30.13%	+16.40%
Turnout		1,64,073	74.21%	+13.26%
BJP hold		Swing	▲16.40	

=== 2008 ===
2008 Rajasthan Legislative Assembly election: Kota South
Party	Candidate	Votes	%	±%
BJP	Om Birla	74,381	50.39	
INC	Ram Kishan	50,126	36.66	
Jago Party	Vinay Sharma	1,723	1.26	
BSP	Dr. S Bharadwaj	1,292	0.94	
CPI	Harilal	1,207	0.88	
IJP	Kewal Kishan	159	0.12	
Majority		24,452	13.73	
Turnout		136,750	60.95	
BJP win (new seat)				

== See also ==
- List of constituencies of the Rajasthan Legislative Assembly
- Kota district
