= P. K. Kodiyan =

Indian politician

P.K. Kodiyan (September 22, 1923 - October 28, 2001) was an Indian politician and a leader of the Communist Party of India (CPI). He was a member of the 2nd Lok Sabha, representing the Kollam constituency and 6th & 7th Lok Sabha representing the Adoor constituency.
