= Mrityunjay Kumar Singh =

Indian writer (born 1961)

- Born: 30 August 1961; Sonbarsa, Bihar
- Education: St. Columbus College, Hazaribagh; Kirori Mal College, DU
- Occupations: Indian Police Service, poet, columnist, lyricist, Folk Singer
- Spouse: Manjula Singh
- Children: Ishaan Singh & Shaunak Singh
- Writing career
- Notable works: Collection of Hindi Poems, KIRCHEN & Bilingual Transcreation (Hindi & English) of 'MEGHDOOT' of Kalidasa
- Website: mrityunjaykumarsingh.blogspot.com

Mrityunjay Kumar Singh (born 30 August 1961) is an IPS Officer of the 1987 batch belonging to the West Bengal Cadre. He is also a poet, columnist, lyricist and folk musician.

== Life ==
Mrityunjay Kumar Singh, also known as MK Singh, was born in 1961 in Sonbarsa, Bihar. He was brought up in the rural environs of Western Bihar, a land rich and ripe with crops and culture.

As Superintendent of Police, Murshidabad he worked for safety, security and conservation of the Hazar Duari palace and museum of Murshidabad in West Bengal, being maintained by the Archaeological Survey of India in 1997–98.

He also worked simultaneously as the Director of the Branch Secretariat of Ministry of External Affairs, Kolkata dealing with consular, border and bilateral and multilateral diplomatic matters related to Bangladesh, Bhutan and Nepal.

MK worked with NGOs of India and Bangladesh dealing with illegal child trafficking and migration across International border and their restoration and reintegration with their families from 2003 to 2007.

He also represented India in UNICEF's multilateral discussion on illegal trafficking and migration of Children across International borders in South Asia held in Kathmandu, Nepal in 2007.

MK represented India as a member of the Working Committee to formulate scope and objectives of 'Bali Democracy Forum'(a multilateral forum to discuss and deliberate on development & implementation of democracy and its ethics) in December 2008.

As Counsellor of the Embassy of India, Jakarta and Director of Jawaharlal Nehru Indian Cultural Centre, Bali, worked to innovate ways for breaking new grounds of people to people contact, collaborations, sharing and deeper understanding of diverse views and cultures. He hosted a 'Festival of India' in Indonesia in 2009–10 (held each 7 years) with 48 events in 7 Indonesian cities under the supervision of the Ambassador of India to Indonesia. Commended by the Indian Ambassador for the said feat.

After completing his tenure as Counsellor (culture), Embassy of India, Jakarta and Director of the Jawaharlal Nehru Indian Culture Centre of Jakarta as well as Indian Culture Centre, Bali, he has returned to his cadre (West Bengal) in India in 2011 and is presently working as Commandant General & Director General of Police (Home Guards), West Bengal.

MK is married to Manjula Singh, who worked as lecturer of Political Science in University of Delhi, Loreto College, Darjeeling (from 1986 to 1993)and as a Consultant to the National Centre for Jute Diversification, Ministry of Textiles, Government of India for a project jointly funded by UNDP and Government of India (from 2004 to 2008). She is also associated with the management of 'Sarada Kalyan Bhandar', a NGO working with the women and children of nine villages of Midnapore in the state of West Bengal since 1998. Manjula is working as the Advisor for the Eastern India Health Initiative (a CSR activity of Medica Super speciality Hospital of Kolkata).

He has two sons – Ishaan Singh and Shaunak Singh.

MK is living and working in Kolkata (West Bengal), India.

== Works ==
=== Novel ===
- 'Ganga Ratan Bidesi' - in Bhojpuri - Published in January 2019 by The Bharatiya Jnanpith, New Delhi. This novel is now going to be release on 1 July on Yayawari Via Bhojpuri as an audio book.

=== Poem ===
- Collection of poems – 'KIRCHEN' (The Splinters) in 2007 by Anupam Prakashan of Patna, attracted critical appreciation of many Hindi literary magazines including 'Vagaarth' of Bhartiya Bhasa Parishad, Kolkata and received special critique of Mr. Arun Kamal, a Hindi poet of exceptional repute
- 'Meghdoot: The Emissary of Sunderance' – a transcreation of Sanskrit classic of Kalidasa written in the 4th or 5th century AD – published by Trafford Publishing of the US in 2012.
- Poetic transcreation of Kalidasa's Sanskrit classic 'Meghdoot: Virah ka Doot' published by Rajkamal Prakashan, New Delhi in 2014.
- Collection of Hindi poems 'Aas ke Aabhas'(January 2019 - by Shilpayan Publishers, New Delhi)

=== Music and drama ===
- Wrote lyrics, co-composed music and sang a Bhojpuri folk song for an album 'Suranjali' made by Eastern Zonal Culture Centre, Ministry of Culture, Government of India in December 2006 and was released by the President of India
- Travelled to Guyana & Surinam on ICCR's sponsorship in 2004, and to Mauritius on Ministry of Culture, India's sponsorship in 2005 to perform during various events organised by the Indian Diaspora
- Wrote lyrics for the songs of films like 'Chokher Bali'of Rituparno Ghosh, 'Dharm' by Bhavna Talwar, 'Via Darjeeling' of NDFC by Arindam Nandy, 'Chaturanga' of Suman Mukhopadhyay and many others
- Wrote lyrics for the songs of films like 'Chokher Bali'of Rituparno Ghosh, 'Dharm' by Bhavna Talwar, 'Via Darjeeling' of NDFC by Arindam Nandy, 'Chaturanga' of Suman Mukhopadhyay and many others
- Wrote concept and script of two collaborative dance dramas – a) 'Sri Kandi' (Shikhandi) based on tales and mythologies from Mahabharata enacted by Javanese dancing icon Didik Nini Thowok with his group of 6 dancers along with 3 Kathak and 2 Chhau dancers from India. Staged in 5 cities of Indonesia and selected by the Ministry of Culture & Tourism, Republic of Indonesia for their ASEAN International cultural event
- 'Putri Segara' (daughter of the Sea) with Balinese and Kathak dancers based on Rabindranath Tagore's poem 'Sagarika' written on Bali in 1927 during his visit to the island
- working on a musical adaptation of his 'Meghdoot' to be presented on international stage in the form of a musical drama in association with maestro Pandit Tanmoy Bose and composer Prabuddha Banarjee.
- Wrote and staged a poignant satire 'Dev Sabha'in 2015

=== Papers and presentations ===
- Presented a paper on "Literacy and Education through Mother Language" in a Seminar on International Mother Language Day organised by UNESCO and the National Ministry of Education, Republic of Indonesia at Institute of Technology, Bandung on 26 May 2009. The paper is published in the book of selected presentations
- Spoke on "Moslem's Heritage and its Challenges: Acceptable and Integrated Moslem” in a Talk Show at Universitas Indonesia, Depok in June 2009
- Key note speech on ‘Language Policy in India’ was published in the Book of selected Papers of the Language Centre, Ministry of Education, Republic of Indonesia in November 2010
- Lecture at London School of Public Relation (LSPR), Jakarta on ‘The similarities and affinity of Indian & Indonesian Culture” for Intercultural Day (STIKOM) in July 2009
- Represented India in the ‘Trail of Civilization’ on Borobudur at Yogyakarta in May 2009. It is a Multi-lateral cultural forum initiated by Indonesia by signing a ‘Borobudur Declaration’ between 6 nations – Indonesia, Cambodia, Thailand, Vietnam, Laos and Myanmar. The forum has included India, China, Japan and Korea as friends and observers to the forum..

=== Awards ===
- Awarded the President of India Medal for Meritorious Service in 2003.
- Awarded ‘Kalakar Award’for ‘Best music in Regional Language’ in 2003 for Bhojpuri album ‘Ae Babua’ released by T-series in India.
- Felicitated by Bharatiya Sahitya Punarnirman Mission for my contribution to folk music and Hindi poetry in 2003 at Kolkata, India.)

== MK Singh's poetry in Indian cinema ==
MK's song Uphaar was featured in the Hindi film Dharm (2007) and Via Darjeeling (2008), also a Bengali film called Chokher Bali.
