= Chengara Surendran =

Indian politician

Member of parliament, Lok Sabha
- In office 13 May 2004 – 16 May 2009
- Preceded by: Kodikunnil Suresh
- Succeeded by: constituency abolished
- Constituency: Adoor
- In office 10 March 1998 – 26 April 1999
- Preceded by: Kodikunnil Suresh
- Succeeded by: Kodikunnil Suresh
- Constituency: Adoor

Personal details
- Born: 31 January 1968 (age 58) Pathanamthitta, Kerala
- Party: CPI
- Spouse: Biji Surendran
- As of 23 September, 2006

Chengara Surendran (born 31 January 1968) is an Indian politician who was a member of the 14th Lok Sabha of India. He represented the Adoor constituency of Kerala and is a member of the Communist Party of India (CPI) political party.

== Electoral History ==
=== Lok Sabha ===
Year	Constituency	Party	Votes	%	Opponent	Party	Votes	%	Result	Margin	%
1998	Adoor (SC)	CPI	333,297	48.53	Kodikunnil Suresh	INC	316,292	46.05	Won	▲17,005	▲2.48
1999	Adoor (SC)	CPI	314,997	45.12	Kodikunnil Suresh	INC	337,003	48.27	Lost	▼22,006	▼3.15
2004	Adoor (SC)	CPI	332,216	48.54	Kodikunnil Suresh	INC	277,682	40.57	Won	▲54,534	▲7.97
2014	Mavelikara	CPI	369,695	41.57	Kodikunnil Suresh	INC	402,432	45.25	Lost	▼32,737	▼3.68
