= 2024 Speaker of the Lok Sabha election =

Lok Sabha Speaker election in India

← 1976	26 June 2024	2029 →
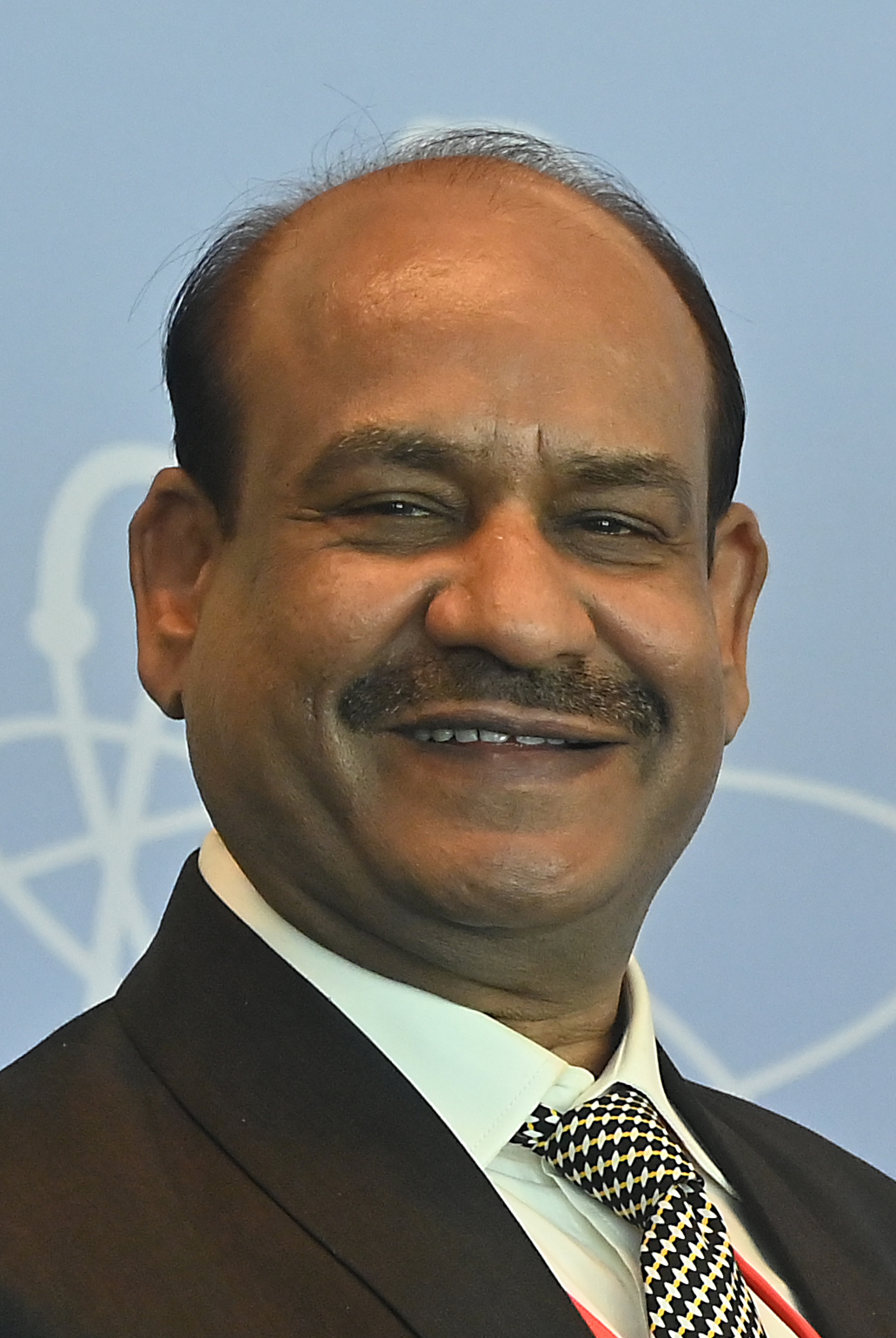

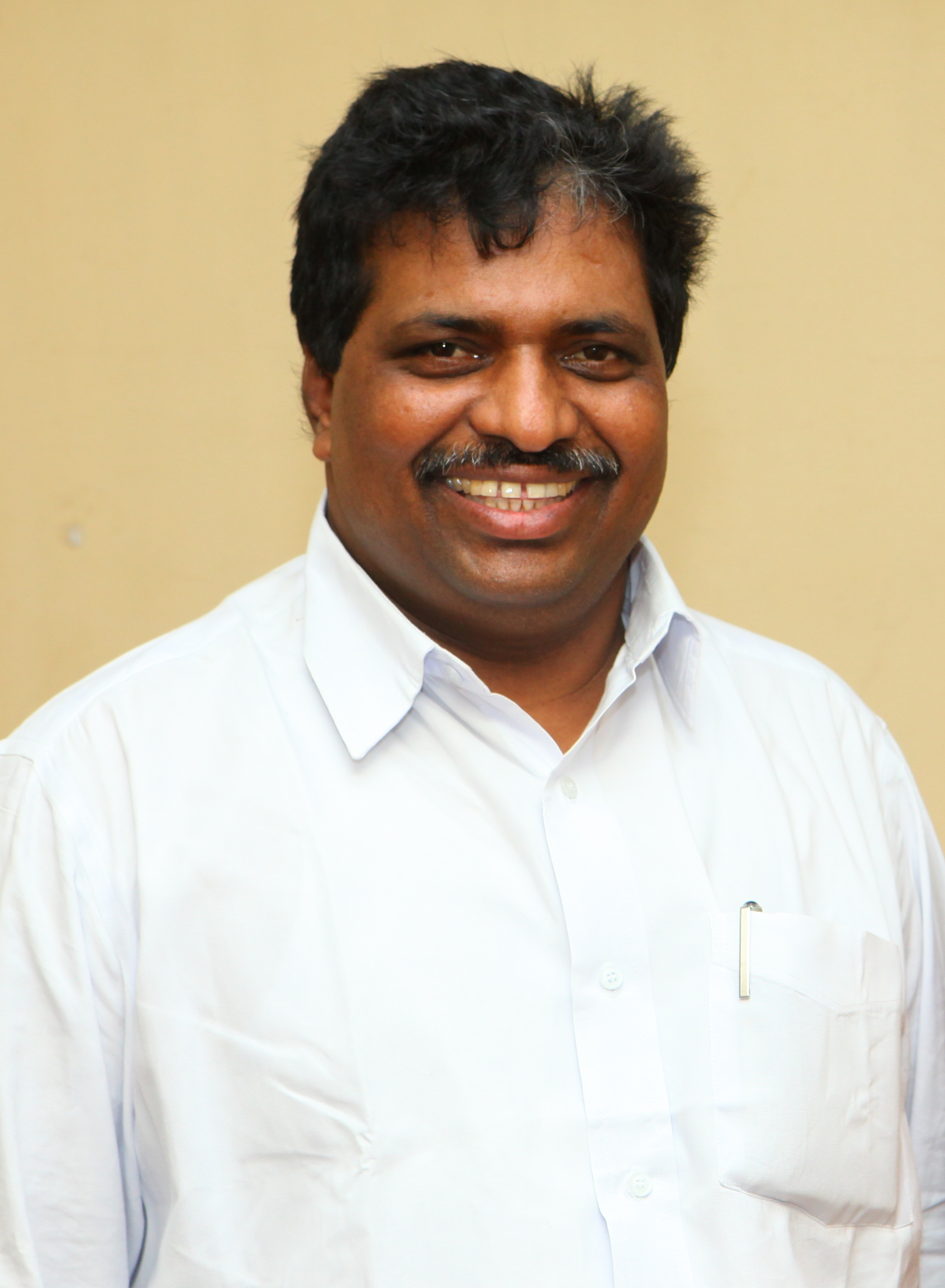
	Majority party	Minority party
Candidate	Om Birla	Kodikunnil Suresh
Party	BJP	INC
Alliance	NDA	INDIA
Constituency	Kota	Mavelikara
Result	Won by Majority Voice	Lost by Minority Voice
Speaker before election
Om Birla
BJP
Elected Speaker
Om Birla
BJP

The 2024 Lok Sabha Speaker election in India was held on 26 June 2024 to elect the Speaker of the 18th Lok Sabha. It was the fourth Lok Sabha Speaker election in India after 1952, 1967, and 1976 elections. (Note: 6 elections were held to elect speakers of Central Legislative Assembly from 1925 to 1946.) Incumbent Speaker Om Birla of the BJP was elected back to the position after defeating Kodikunnil Suresh of the INC.

== History ==
In 1952, following the election of the 1st Lok Sabha, 2 leaders from the Congress, G. V. Mavalankar and Shankar Shantaram More contested for the post, with the former winning with 394 votes, with only 5 MPs opposing. In 1967, Congress leader Neelam Sanjiva Reddy contested against Independent MP Tenneti Viswanadham for the Speaker's post, with the former winning with 278 votes, while 207 members voted against him. In 1976, following the resignation of G. S. Dhillon, Bali Ram Bhagat of INC(R) contested against Jagannathrao Joshi of BJS for the post of Speaker with 344 votes in his favour and 58 voting against him. Since the 6th Lok Sabha, the speaker has been selected by the ruling party without a formal election with support from the Opposition parties in exchange for the government to nominate an Opposition MP as the Deputy Speaker. The Opposition parties under the INDIA (buoyed by its increase in numbers) were demanding the post of deputy speaker (vacant throughout the duration of the previous Lok Sabha) as per the convention in exchange for their unconditional support to the NDA candidate for the post of speaker. After the government refused to meet their demand, the opposition fielded its candidate for election to the post of the Speaker of the Lok Sabha.

== Election process ==
Newly elected Members of Parliament from the Lok Sabha who have been administered the oath of office by the pro-tem Speaker (whose oath is administered by the President) elect the Speaker among themselves. The Speaker should be someone who understands how the Lok Sabha functions and should be someone accepted among the ruling and opposition parties.

After the general elections, the President of India notifies the first meeting of the Lok Sabha as well as the date for the election of the Speaker. Generally either on the day of the election of the Speaker of a day before it, the Prime Minister or the Minister of Parliamentary Affairs proposes the name of the candidate. Any other candidate may also submit their names however, until now, all elections of Lok Sabha speakers have been unanimous. If only one name is proposed, the Speaker is elected without any formal vote. However, if more than one nomination is received, a division (vote) is called. The successful candidate is elected as Speaker of the Lok Sabha.

== Election schedule ==
S.No.	Event	Date	Day
1.	Date of filing nominations	25 June 2024	Tuesday
2.	Date of election and result	26 June 2024	Wednesday

== Election ==
The BJP led NDA fielded 3 time Kota MP, Om Birla, who had also served as the Speaker for the previous Lok Sabha as its candidate. Birla's tenure was characterised by frequent suspension of Opposition MPs. In the last session of the previous Lok Sabha, he had suspended a total of 100 MPs of the Opposition for disrupting parliamentary business in demand of a statement from Home Minister Amit Shah on the breach of parliamentary security, including 45 MPs on a single day which was considered unprecedented in India's parliamentary history till then.

The opposition Congress led INDIA fielded its seniormost MP, 8 time MP from Mavelikara, Kodikunnil Suresh. As the seniormost MP amongst all elected members of the 18th Lok Sabha, it was expected that the government would make Suresh the pro-tem Speaker according to the established parliamentary traditions. However, the government instead chose Cuttack MP Bhartruhari Mahtab, who had been elected on a BJP ticket this time after representing BJD for the last 6 terms as the pro-tem Speaker, drawing widespread condemnation from the Opposition.

The election was conducted through voice vote. The NDA had the clear majority with 293 MPs. Om Birla was also supported by unaligned parties like the YSRCP (4 MPs), SAD (1 MP), ASP(KR) (1 MP) & VPP (1 MP). The opposition INDIA (234 MPs + 3 Independents) was on backfoot since 5 of its members were yet to take oath as MPs, which meant that they couldn't participate in the voting process. AIMIM (1 MP), ZPM (1 MP) & 2 Independents (Sarabjeet Singh Khalsa & Umeshbhai Patel) didn't participate in the voting.

== See also ==
- 2024 Indian general election
- List of members of the 18th Lok Sabha
