= Arjun Dev (historian) =

Indian historian, educationist (1938-2020)

Professor Arjun Dev
- Born: 2 November 1938; Layyah, West Punjab
- Died: 29 March 2020 (aged 81); Noida , Uttar Pradesh
- Occupations: Historian, Educationist
- Spouse: Indira Arjun Dev

Academic background
- Education: MA (History)
- Alma mater: Delhi University; Kirori Mal College
- Academic advisor: National Steering Committee

Academic work
- Institutions: National Council of Educational Research and Training; Indian Council of Historical Research

Arjun Dev (2 November 1938 – 29 March 2020) was an Indian historian and educationist. He was associated with the National Council of Educational Research and Training (NCERT) throughout his career. He wrote several books for NCERT on modern and contemporary India and on other countries in collaboration with his wife, Indira Arjun Dev. His History of the World: From the Late 19th to the Early 20th Century was discontinued by the NCERT during the National Democratic Alliance's government, but was republished by Orient Blackswan in 2002. He also contributed to books for school children, as well as writing about communal controversies and modern and scientific ideology.

== Early life and education ==
Dev was born on 12 November 1938 in Layyah, West Punjab (in modern-day Pakistan). He received his early schooling in Ambala and later in 1959, he attended Kirori Mal College where he achieved a Master of Arts in history. He also attended Delhi University. He was married to Indira Arjun Dev.

== Career ==
Dev served as the National Steering Committee's Member Secretary on textbook evaluation. Under his leadership, a detailed report was produced for the committee between 1993 and 1994. The report addressed the communal violence, Hindutva and hatred towards minorities which was being propagateded through school textbooks. After retiring from the NCERT, he collaborated with the Indian Council of Historical Research. His later work covered the period up to 1947. A book about 1941 colonial India, edited by Professor Sucheta Mahajan, remains unpublished despite several requests submitted to the government to release it.
