= Adoor Lok Sabha constituency =

Former constituency of the Indian parliament in Kerala, India

Coordinates: 9.2°N 76.7°E

Adoor
- Former Lok Sabha constituency

Constituency details
- Country: India
- Region: South India
- State: Kerala
- Established: 1967
- Abolished: 2008
- Reservation: SC

Adoor Lok Sabha constituency was a Lok Sabha constituency in Kerala, dissolved in 2008. The seat was reserved for scheduled castes.

== Assembly segments ==
Adoor Lok Sabha constituency was composed of the following assembly segments:

1. Konni
2. Pathanapuram
3. Punaloor
4. Chadayamangalam
5. Kottarakara
6. Neduvathur (SC)
7. Adoor

== Members of Parliament ==
| Year | Member | Party |
|---|---|---|
| 1967 | P. C. Adichan | Communist Party of India |
| 1971 | Bhargavi Thankappan | Communist Party of India |
| 1977 | P.K. Kodiyan | Communist Party of India |
| 1980 | P.K. Kodiyan | Communist Party of India |
| 1984 | K.K. Kunhambu | Indian National Congress |
| 1989 | Kodikunnil Suresh | Indian National Congress |
| 1991 | Kodikunnil Suresh | Indian National Congress |
| 1996 | Kodikunnil Suresh | Indian National Congress |
| 1998 | Chengara Surendran | Communist Party of India |
| 1999 | Kodikunnil Suresh | Indian National Congress |
| 2004 | Chengara Surendran | Communist Party of India |

2008 Onward: Constituency does not exist

== See also ==
- Adoor
- List of former constituencies of the Lok Sabha
