= Lok Sabha Secretariat =

Governing body of the lower house of the Parliament of India

- Lok Sabhā Sacivālaya
- Emblem of India

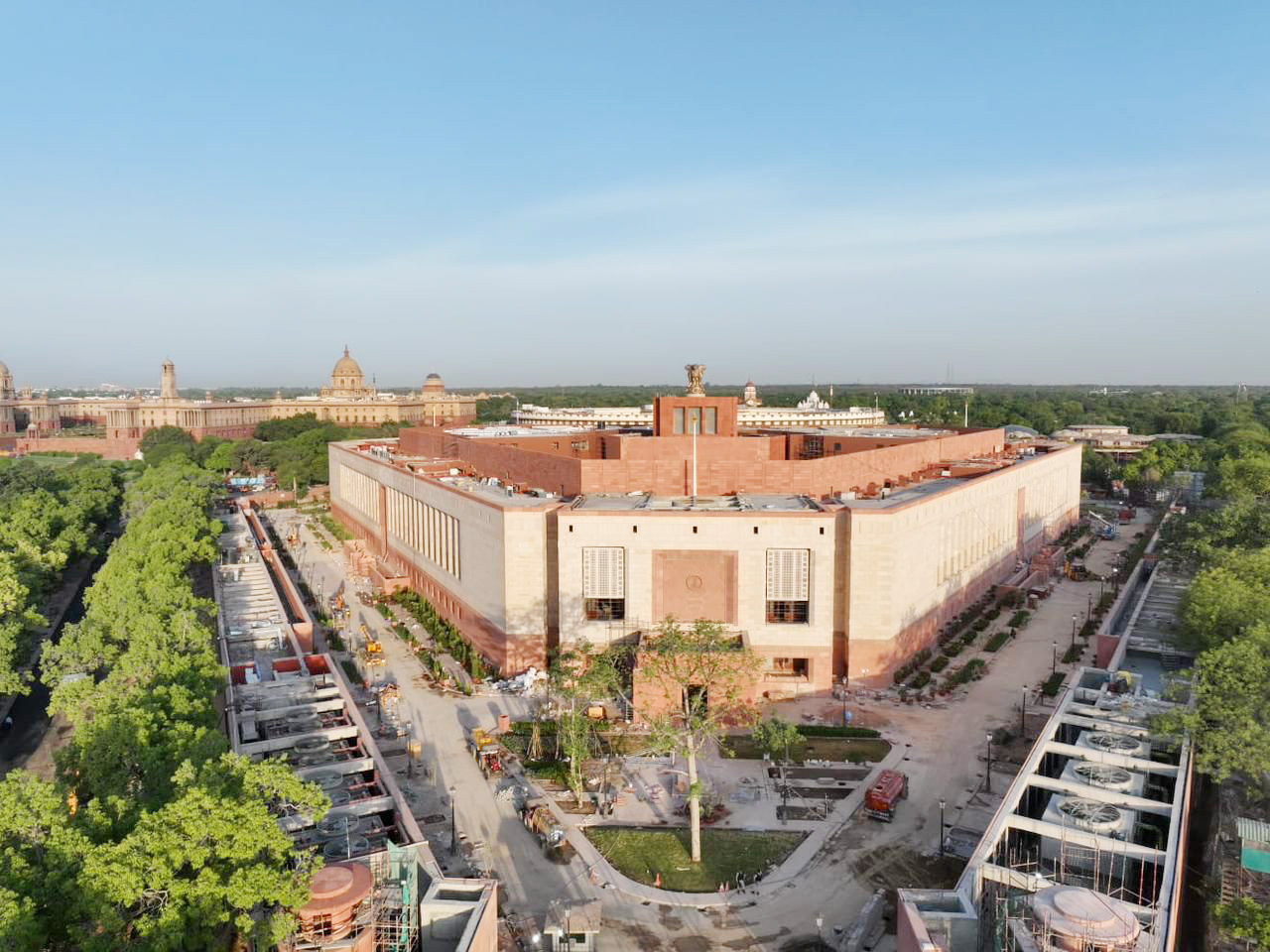
- Sansad Bhavan, the meeting place of Parliament of India

Secretariat overview
- Jurisdiction: Republic of India
- Headquarters: Sansad Bhavan, Rafi Marg, New Delhi, Delhi, India
- Minister responsible: Om Birla, Speaker
- Secretariat executive: Utpal Kumar Singh, IAS, Secretary General
- Parent department: Parliament of India
- Website: Lok Sabha Secretariat

The Lok Sabha Secretariat is the governing body of Lok Sabha, the lower house of the Parliament of India, which functions under the advice of the Speaker of Lok Sabha.

In the discharge of his constitutional and statutory responsibilities, the Speaker of the Lok Sabha is assisted by a Secretary-General, (whose pay scale, position and status etc. is equivalent to that of the highest-ranking official in the Government of India i.e. Cabinet Secretary), functionaries of the level of the Additional Secretary, Joint Secretary and other officers and staff of the Secretariat at various levels.

The Secretary-General remains in office till his/her retirement at the age of 60. He/she is answerable only to the Speaker, his action cannot be discussed or criticised in or outside the Lok Sabha.

On behalf of the President of India, Secretary-General summons members to attend sessions of Parliament and authenticates bills in the absence of the Speaker.
