= Sonam Sherpa =

Indian guitarist (1971–2020)

- Born: 8 October 1971 Kalimpong, West Bengal, India
- Died: 14 February 2020 (aged 48) Kurseong, West Bengal, India
- Genres: Rock, blues
- Occupation(s): Musician, guitarist
- Years active: 1991–2020

Sonam Sherpa (8 October 1971 – 14 February 2020) was the lead guitarist and a founding member of the Indian band Parikrama.

== Early life and education ==
Sherpa did his schooling in Kalimpong, West Bengal from St. Augustine's School. He went to Delhi for graduate studies and joined Kirori Mal College for B. Com(Hons), Delhi University. He was a founder member of the band Mrigya and North East Express.

== Career ==
Sherpa started playing the guitar at the age of 9. He joined Parikrama at its inception in 1991. He remained as the lead guitarist in the band until his death. Sherpa was featured on CNBC's Young Turks, a show focusing on young entrepreneurs. The BBC also featured him and his band in a rockumentary while on their Download Festival Tour. He took steps in the Indian film industry (Bollywood) by composing the songs and music for the feature film “Manjunath”.

Sherpa collaborated with Nitin Malik and Subir Malik (both from Parikrama) to compose music for movie Manjunath. The music of the film received a rating of 2.5 stars from Times of India.

Sherpa owned and ran Parikrama school based at Hauz Khas Village, New Delhi.

He died of a stroke on 14 February 2020.
