= Parikrama (band) =

Indian rock and roll band

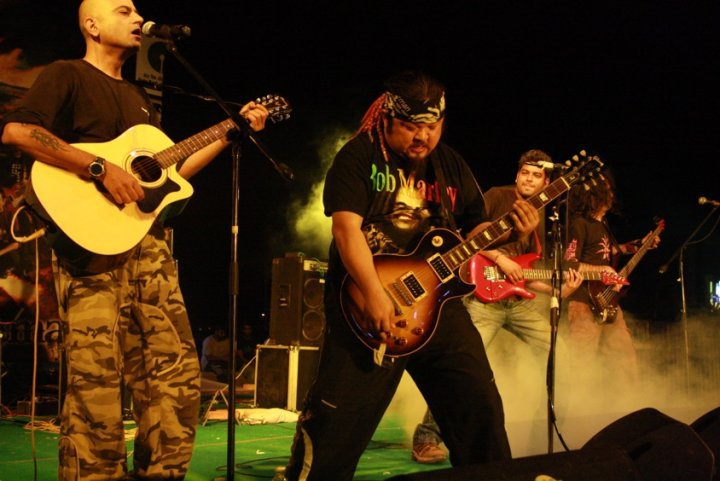

Background information
- Origin: Delhi, India
- Genres: Indian rock Blues
- Years active: 1991–present
- Labels: Rock Street Journal, Channel V
- Members: Nitin Malik; Saurabh Choudhary; Subir Malik; Sonam Sherpa; Gaurav Balani; Srijan Mahajan; Shambu Nath Bhattacharya; Suhail Ali Khan; Shashank Singhania; Dhruv Bedi
- Past members: Vipin Mishra; Dilip Ramachandran; Chintan Kalra; Prashant Bahadur; Rahul Malhotra; Rajat Kakkar; Steve Namchyo; Valentine Shipley; Sharat Chandra Srivastava; Imran Khan; Gyan Singh
- Website: www.parikrama.com/home.html

Parikrama is a rock band from Delhi, India, formed in 1991 in Delhi. The band is considered to be one of Asia's biggest rock groups. Parikrama toured internationally with Iron Maiden in 2007, playing at the Download Festival in England. The band is known for its high-energy live performances and has released many singles in its 3 decade long career.

In its 2014 listing of "25 Greatest Indian Rock Songs of the last 30+ Years", Rolling Stone India featured "But It Rained" (2001) by the band.

In February 2020, the band's lead guitarist Sonam Sherpa died of cardiac arrest.

On 8 October 2020, Parikrama relaunched their 2001 single 'But It Rained' with the entire solo, as was played by Sonam Sherpa.

== Members ==
The band consists of:

- Nitin Malik – Lead vocalist
- Sonam Sherpa – Lead guitarist (died 2020)
- Abhishek Mittal - Lead guitarist (joined in 2020)
- Saurabh Choudhary – Guitarist
- Subir Malik – Organist, Synthesizer
- Gaurav Balani – Bass guitarist
- Srijan Mahajan – Drummer

Accompanied by:

- Suhail Ali Khan – Violinist
- Shambu Nath – Tabla, Percussions
- Shashank Singhania – Flute
- Dhruv Bedi – Sitar
- Rajesh Nair / Nitin Sidhu / Vikram Mishra – Sound Engineer

Subir and Nitin Malik are brothers, with Subir being two years elder to Nitin. Both of them studied at St. Xavier's, Delhi. All the members of the band except Nitin, who went to Hindu College, went to Kirorimal College and were part of MUSOC (music society). Saurabh Chaudhry has a degree in business administration.

== History ==
They are yet to release a full-length album, because they prefer giving out their music for free. They have had millions of downloads from their site and other related pages. They did release a free multimedia CD of their singles and videos in 2001. The band does not have any policies against their music being copied and distributed. They have made their music available for download on their official website.

The band often fuses Indian classical music instruments such as mridangam, tabla and flute with conventional rock instruments including guitar, drums and keyboards. They have been inspired and influenced by Pink Floyd, Jimi Hendrix and The Doors. Sonam Sherpa and Saurabh Chaudhary are endorsees of Carl Martin effect pedals.

== Recordings ==
Parikrama rarely records music in the studio, and most recordings are made in live performances. On being asked in a 2012 interview if they plan a compilation album of live recordings, the band encouraged listeners to download their recordings from Facebook or Reverbnation and "make your own album, the way u want it".

The first song "Xerox" was named 'the face of Indian rock'. Their first hit single "Till I'm No One Again" was released in 1995 along with "Open Skies". It was among thirteen other songs chosen from the demos sent by a hundred and fifty other bands in the country. This release, Great Indian Rock Volume 1, was produced by Amit Saigal, owner and publisher of the India's first rock magazine: Rock Street Journal.

Another song, "Gonna Get It", was released in 1996.

Their sixth number in succession was released in 1997: "Load Up".

This band composed the song "The Superhero" for Bangalore. This was in response to the visit of Microsoft's chairman Bill Gates to the IT capital of India, Bangalore.

"But It Rained" was released in 2001. The song was about the kidnappings in the Kashmir Valley in 1995. This song is probably their biggest hit. They were surprised when a crowd of 40,000 sang along with them in their opening set for the Iron Maiden concert in Bangalore.

A Parikrama original "Rhythm and Blues" was created in course of their jam session with Usha Uthup.

Parikrama released a lockdown version of 'Vapourize' in which Nitin sang the song in a new style.
