= K. C. Rastogi =

Indian politician

Shri K.C. Rastogi was a former Secretary-General of 9th Lok Sabha, 10th Lok Sabha and Lok Sabha Secretariat, Parliament of India. He was the Secretary-General of Lok Sabha from 21 August 1990 to 31 Dec 1991.
