= Utpal Kumar Singh =

Secretary-General of the Lok Sabha since 2020

Utpal Kumar Singh IAS (Retd.)
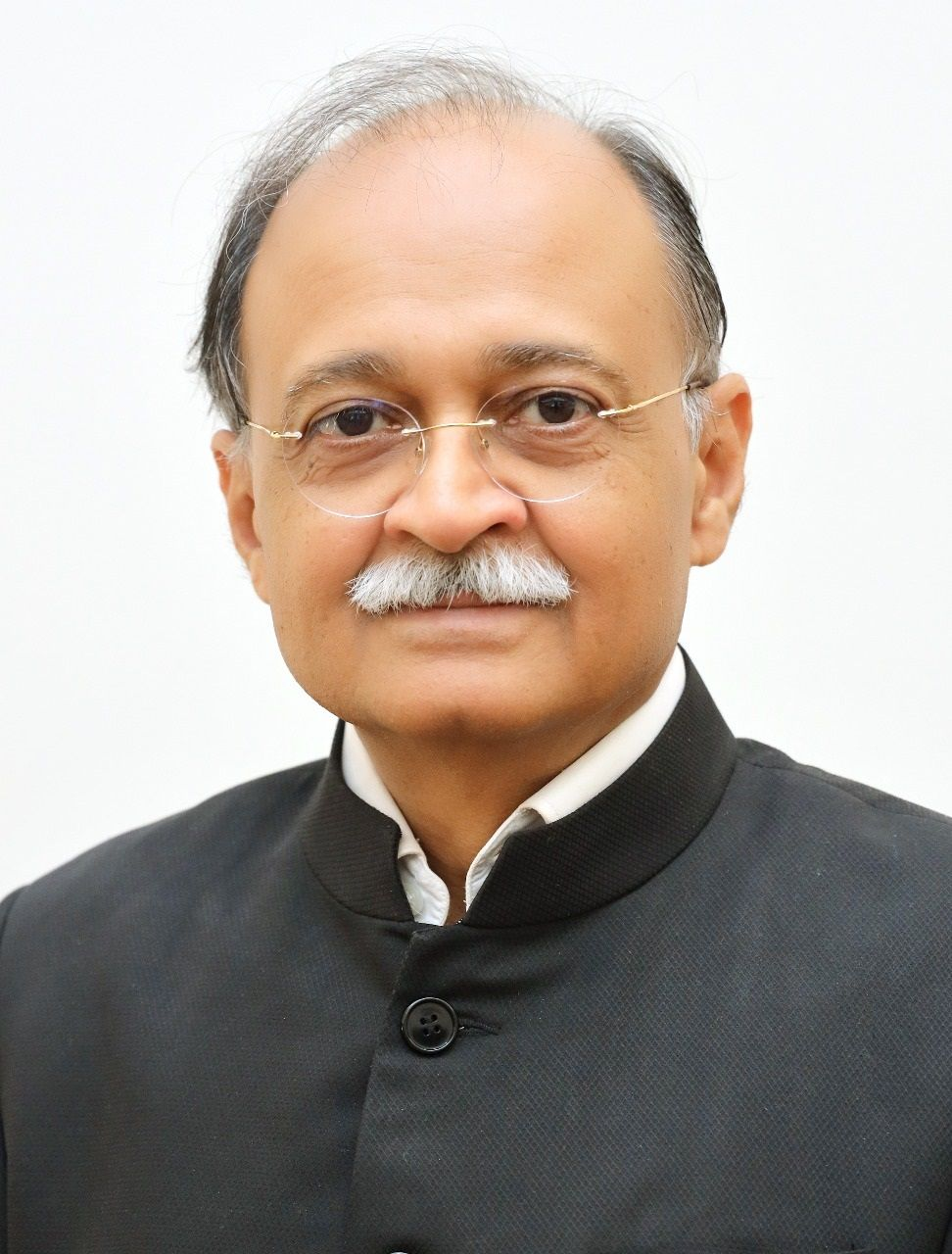
- Official portrait, 2021

Secretary General of the Lok Sabha
- Incumbent
- Assumed office 30 November 2020
- Speaker: Om Birla
- Preceded by: Snehlata Shrivastava

Secretary of Lok Sabha Secretariat
- In office 1 September 2020 – 30 November 2020
- Secretary-General: Snehlata Shrivastava

Chief Secretary of Uttarakhand
- In office 25 October 2017 – 31 July 2020
- Governor: Baby Rani Maurya (from August 2018); Krishan Kant Paul (till August 2018)
- Preceded by: S. Ramaswamy
- Succeeded by: Om Prakash Singh

Joint Secretary of the Ministry of Agriculture and Farmers Welfare
- In office 1 May 2012 – 17 July 2016

Additional Secretary of the Ministry of Agriculture and Farmers' Welfare
- In office 18 July 2016 – 24 October 2017

Personal details
- Born: 29 July 1960 (age 66) Bokaro Thermal, Bihar, India
- Spouse: Nipunika Singh
- Children: 1
- Education: Kirori Mal College, University of Delhi (B.A Hons.); International Institute of Social Studies (M.A in History)
- Occupation: Civil servant; bureaucrat
- Employer: Indian Administrative Service

Utpal Kumar Singh (born 29 July 1960) is a retired Indian Administrative Service officer of 1986 batch from Uttarakhand cadre who is serving as the Secretary General of the Lok Sabha the lower house of Indian parliament since 30 November 2020.

== Early life ==
Singh was born to Braj Kishore Singh and Annapurna Singh on 29 July 1960 in Bokaro (Thermal), which is now a part of Jharkhand.

== Education ==
He has completed his B.A. (Hons), M.A from Kirori Mal College of Delhi University and his graduate studies from International Institute of Social Studies from where he received an M.A degree in Public Policy located in The Hague, Netherlands.

== Career ==
Singh has held several positions at the center, including Additional Secretary, Ministry of Agriculture and Farmers Welfare.

During his tenure as Chief Secretary of Uttarakhand (2017–2020), Singh worked alongside several senior Indian Administrative Service (IAS) officers, including Vinod Prasad Raturi, who held the position of Revenue Secretary at that time.

== Personal life ==
Singh is married to Nipunika Singh and they have one child.
