= Kodikunnil Suresh =

Indian politician (born 1962)

Kodikunnil Suresh MP
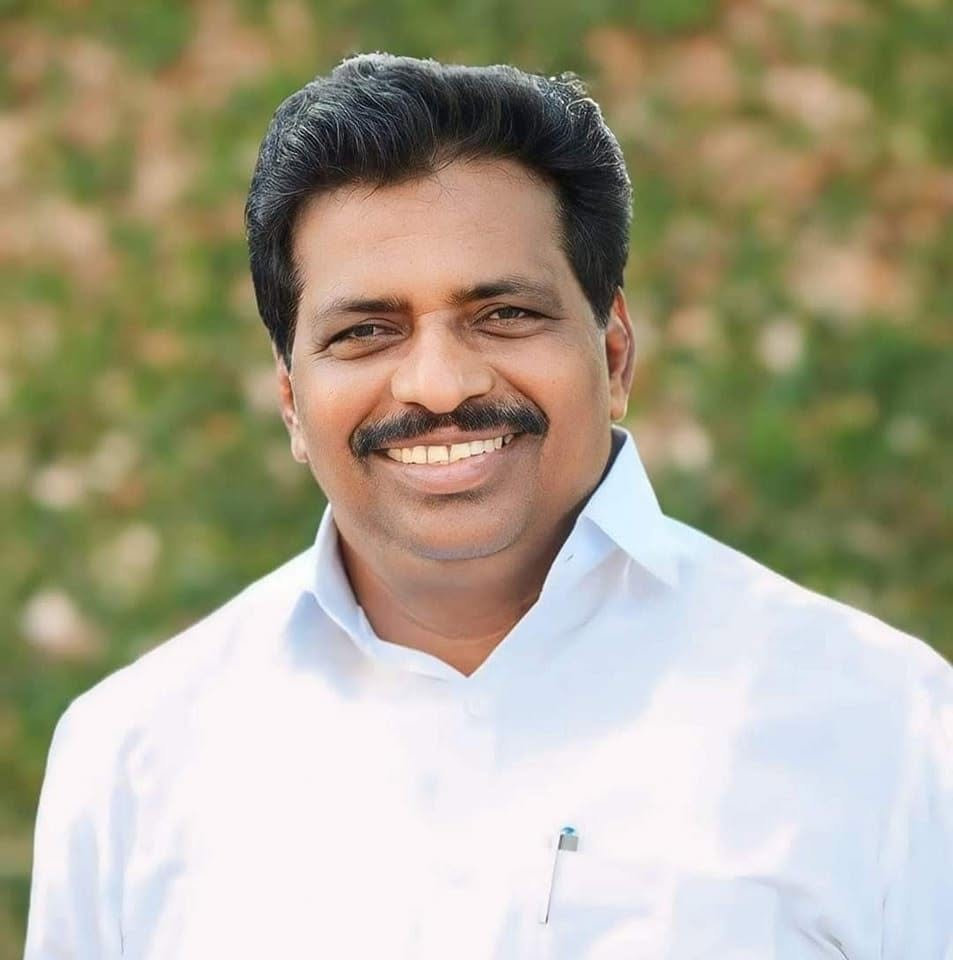
- Official portrait, 2019

Member of Parliament, Lok Sabha
- Incumbent
- Assumed office 31 May 2009
- Preceded by: C. S. Sujatha
- Constituency: Mavelikkara, Kerala
- In office 6 October 1999 – 13 May 2004
- Preceded by: Chengara Surendran
- Succeeded by: Chengara Surendran
- Constituency: Adoor, Kerala
- In office 28 November 1989 – 4 December 1997
- Preceded by: K. K. Kunhambu
- Succeeded by: Chengara Surendran
- Constituency: Adoor, Kerala

Union Minister of State for Labour and Employment
- In office 28 October 2012 – 26 May 2014
- Prime Minister: Manmohan Singh
- Minister: Mallikarjun Kharge; Shish Ram Ola; Oscar Fernandes
- Preceded by: Harish Rawat
- Succeeded by: Vishnudeo Sai

Personal details
- Born: 4 June 1962 (age 64) Kodikunnil, Kerala, India
- Party: Indian National Congress
- Spouse: Bindu Suresh (m. 1994)
- Children: 2
- Education: Bachelor of Laws
- Alma mater: Mar Ivanios College, Thiruvananthapuram; Government Law College, Thiruvananthapuram

Kodikunnil Suresh (born 4 June 1962) is an Indian politician and Congress Working Committee Member (Special Invitee). He is the working-president of the Kerala Pradesh Congress Committee (KPCC). He filed his nomination for Loksabha Speaker post as the candidate of Indian National Developmental Inclusive Alliance and contested the 2024 Lok Sabha Speaker Election. He is the chief Whip of Congress Parliamentary Party in Loksabha. He was a former Union Minister of State for Labour and Employment. He is a member of the Eighteenth Lok Sabha representing Mavelikara in Kerala. He has been elected as a member of Lok Sabha eight times. He has also served as the Secretary of the All India Congress Committee (AICC).

== Early life and education ==
He was born in Kodikunnil, Thiruvananthapuram district to a poor family, as the youngest son of Kunjan and Thankamma. He did his pre-degree from Mar Ivanios College, Thiruvananthapuram and graduation in LL.B from Government Law College, Thiruvananthapuram.

== Political career ==
He was elected to the Lok Sabha for the first time in 1989 and thereafter he won consecutively in the 1991, 1996 and 1999 General Elections to the Lok Sabha from Adoor constituency for four straight terms.

However he was defeated in the 1998 and 2004 general elections.

Kodikunnil served as the member of the Kerala Pradesh Congress Committee and member of All India Congress Committee. He also serves as Kerala Pradesh congress committee General Secretary, DCC President Kollam.

In the general election to the Lok Sabha in 2009, he contested from Mavelikara Lok Sabha constituency and defeated R. S. Anil of the Communist Party of India with a margin of 48,048 votes.

On 19 September 2018, he was appointed as working-president of the Kerala Pradesh Congress Committee (KPCC).

He continued to win in 2009 Indian general election, 2014 Indian general election, 2019 Indian general election and 2024 Indian general election from Mavelikara Lok Sabha constituency and is currently the longest serving Lok Sabha MP as he has remained MP for 29 years, winning the elections 8 times. The position of pro tem speaker, assigned for administering the oath taking ceremony of the elected MPs, is traditionally given to the senior most member. However, this tradition was broken in 2024 after Bhartruhari Mahtab was elected as pro tem speaker. In response, the INDIA alliance nominated K. Suresh as candidate for post of speaker, triggering an election for the post for the first time since independence.

=== Electoral performance ===
Year	Constituency	Party	Votes	%	Opponent	Party	Votes	%	Result	Margin	%
1989	Adoor (SC)	INC	343,672	49.91	N. Rajan	CPI	322,130	46.78	Won	▲21,542	▲3.13
1991	Adoor (SC)	INC	327,066	49.49	Bhargavi Thankappan	CPI	308,471	46.67	Won	▲18,595	▲2.82
1996	Adoor (SC)	INC	351,872	52.58	P.K. Raghavan	CPI	286,327	42.79	Won	▲65,545	▲9.79
1998	Adoor (SC)	INC	316,292	46.05	Chengara Surendran	CPI	333,297	48.53	Lost	▼17,005	▼2.48
1999	Adoor (SC)	INC	337,003	48.27	Chengara Surendran	CPI	314,997	45.12	Won	▲22,006	▲3.15
2004	Adoor (SC)	INC	277,682	40.57	Chengara Surendran	CPI	332,216	48.54	Lost	▼54,534	▼7.97
2009	Mavelikara	INC	397,211	49.42	R.S. Anil	CPI	349,163	43.44	Won	▲48,048	▲5.98
2014	Mavelikara	INC	402,432	45.25	Chengara Surendran	CPI	369,695	41.57	Won	▲32,737	▲3.68
2019	Mavelikkara	INC	440,415	45.29	Chittayam Gopakumar	CPI	379,277	39.01	Won	▲61,138	▲6.28
2024	Mavelikkara	INC	369,516	41.75	Adv. Arun Kumar C. A.	CPI	358,648	40.52	Won	▲10,868	▲1.23

== Controversies ==
His victory in the 2009 general election was declared void by the Kerala High Court over the allegation that his caste certificate was fake, and that he was a Christian. This verdict was later reversed by the Supreme Court of India.

Preceded by C. S. Sujatha	Member of Parliament from Mavelikara; 2009 – present	Incumbent
