= National Green Tribunal =

Indian Legal Affairs department

- National Green Tribunal logo

Agency overview
- Formed: 2010
- Jurisdiction: Government of India
- Headquarters: Copernicus Marg, New Delhi, India
- Annual budget: ₹52.68 crore (US$5.5 million) (2025–26)
- Agency executives: Justice Prakash Shrivastava, Chairperson; Afroz Ahmad, Expert Member; Satyagopal Korlapati, Expert Member; Vijay Kulkarni, Expert Member; A Senthil Vel, Expert Member; Afroz Ahmad, Expert Member
- Parent department: Judiciary of India
- Parent agency: Ministry of Law and Justice, Department of Legal Affairs
- Website: www.greentribunal.gov.in

The National Green Tribunal (NGT) is a statutory body in India that focuses on expeditious disposal of cases related to the protection of the natural environment and natural resources. It was set up under the National Green Tribunal Act in 2010. Its national headquarters is in New Delhi, with regional headquarters in the cities of Bhopal, Pune, Kolkata and Chennai.

== History and objective ==
The National Green Tribunal (NGT) was formed in 2010 under National Green Tribunal Act as a statutory body to deal with the cases related to environmental issues and speedy implementation of decisions relating to them. The tribunal has a mandate to dispose of applications and petitions within six months.

The NGT has given many prominent decisions, such as banning diesel vehicles older than 15 years in Delhi to reduce air pollution. The tribunal in a separate order cancelled the clearance of coal blocks in the forests of Hasdeo-Arand situated in Chhattisgarh state.

The Kolkata bench of the National Green Tribunal banned construction activities and solid waste and noise pollution in the Sunderban, being an eco-sensitive region to protect the wildlife, in November 2016.

== Composition ==
National Green Tribunal with Headquarters in Delhi consists of chairperson who should have been retired as Supreme Court judge. The Judicial members of the tribunal should have been retired as Judge of the High Courts. National Green Tribunal bench consists of ten Judicial Members and ten Expert Members. Any person having a professional qualification with 15 years minimum experience in the subjects of forest conservation and environment and similar areas can qualify for expert member.

Justice Dr Jawad Rahim, a former Judge of High Court of Karnataka, was appointed as an acting chairman in 2018. Justice Prakash Shrivastava is the Current Chairman of National Green Tribunal Chairperson since August 2023.

== Powers ==
National Green Tribunal has been bestowed with powers to decide on questions for implementing laws mentioned in Schedule I of the NGT Act and to be heard on all cases which are civil in nature and deals with environmental issues as follows:

- The Water (Prevention and Control of Pollution) Act, 1974;
- The Water (Prevention and Control of Pollution) Cess Act, 1977;
- The Forest (Conservation) Act, 1980;
- The Air (Prevention and Control of Pollution) Act, 1981;
- The Environment (Protection) Act, 1986;
- The Public Liability Insurance Act, 1991;
- The Biological Diversity Act, 2002.

National Green Tribunal handles every violation related to above laws or any Government decision or order covered under above laws. However, the tribunal has been prohibited to hear any issues which are covered under the Indian Forest Act, 1927, The Wildlife (Protection) Act, 1972, and any other laws made by States which are related to protection of trees, forests, etc.

A National Green tribunal order can be reviewed as per Rule 22 of the National Green Tribunal Rules. An order of the tribunal can also be challenged within ninety days of the same before the Supreme Court, if the review petition before Tribunal fails.

== Places ==
The principal National Green Tribunal bench is located in Delhi, with other benches sitting in Bhopal, Pune, Kolkata and Chennai.

== Governing principles ==
The National Green Tribunal is governed by the principles of natural justice rather than strict procedure that is normally applied by the Code of Civil Procedure. Likewise, the tribunal is not bound by Indian Evidence Act, which makes it easier for conservation groups to present facts and issues before the tribunal compared to other courts.

While passing any award/decision/order, NGT applies the principles of sustainable development, the precautionary principle, and the polluter pays principle.

However, the tribunal may impose costs for lost benefits due to any interim injunction, if it discovers a false claim.

== Challenges ==
The tribunal faces the challenges of understaffing.

== See also ==
- Tribunals in India
