= 9th Lok Sabha =

Lower House members elected in 1989

| ← | 8th | 10th | → |
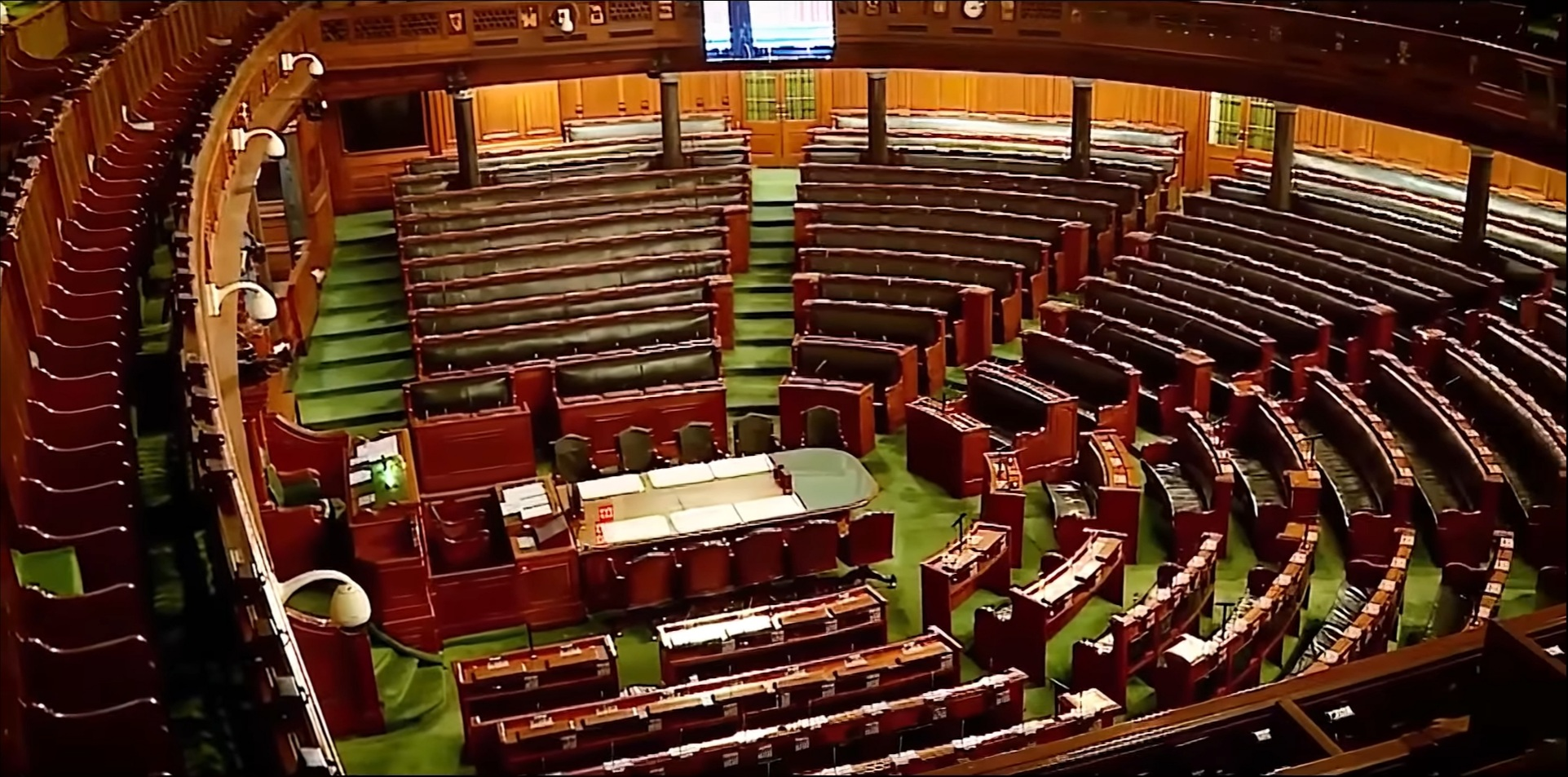
- View of Lok Sabha chamber in the Old Parliament House, New Delhi

Overview
- Legislative body: Indian Parliament
- Election: 1989 Indian general election

The 9th Lok Sabha (2 December 1989 – 13 March 1991) was elected during elections on 22–26 November 1989. The Lok Sabha (House of the People) is the lower house in the Parliament of India. Twelve sitting members from Rajya Sabha were elected to 9th Lok Sabha after the 1989 Indian general election. It was the first Lok Sabha in which no single party held an absolute majority since independence. While Congress(I) was the single largest party, Rajiv Gandhi declined to form a government.

The Janata Dal led National Front coalition with the outside support of the Bharatiya Janata Party and the Left Parties formed the government under Vishwanath Pratap Singh. He became the Prime Minister of India from 2 December 1989 to 10 November 1990. INC lost 217 seats as compared to previous 8th Lok Sabha after the 1984 Indian general election.

After L.K. Advani was arrested during his Ram Rath Yatra, the BJP withdrew its support for the National Front. Singh's government lost the vote of no-confidence. In 1990 Chandra Shekhar became Prime Minister from 10 November 1990 to 21 June 1991 with support from Indian National Congress (I). The Lok Sabha was dissolved by President R. Venkataraman on 13 March 1991, after Shekhar resigned on 6 March following Congress' withdrawal of support.

Shekhar served as caretaker until the 1991 elections, Rajiv Gandhi was assassinated when he was campaigning on 21 May 1991; P.V. Narasimha Rao succeeded him and formed the next 10th Lok Sabha on 20 June 1991.

== Important members ==
- Speaker:
  - Rabi Ray from 19 December 1989 to 9 July 1991
- Deputy Speaker:
  - Shivraj Patil from 19 March 1990 to 13 March 1991
- Secretary General:
  - Subhash C Kashyap from 31 December 1983 to 20 August 1990
  - K. C. Rastogi from 10 September 1990 to 31 December 1991

== List of members by political party ==
Members of the political party in 9th Lok Sabha are given below:

| S.No. | Party name | Number of MP |
|---|---|---|
| 1 | Indian National Congress (INC) | 197 |
| 2 | Janata Dal (JD) | 142 |
| 3 | Bharatiya Janata Party (BJP) | 89 |
| 4 | Communist Party of India (Marxist) (CPI(M)) | 34 |
| 5 | Communist Party of India (CPI) | 12 |
| 6 | All India Anna Dravida Munnetra Kazhagam (AIADMK) | 11 |
| 7 | Independent (Ind.) | 8 |
| 8 | Shiromani Akali Dal (SAD) | 7 |
| 9 | Bahujan Samaj Party (BSP) | 4 |
| 10 | Revolutionary Socialist Party (India) (RSP) | 4 |
| 11 | All India Forward Bloc (AIFB) | 3 |
| 12 | Jammu and Kashmir National Conference (J&KNC) | 3 |
| 13 | Jharkhand Mukti Morcha (JMM) | 3 |
| 14 | Shiv Sena (SS) | 3 |
| 15 | Nominated (NM) | 3 |
| 16 | Indian Union Muslim League (IUML) | 2 |
| 17 | Telugu Desam Party (TDP) | 2 |
| 18 | All India Majlis-e-Ittehadul Muslimeen (AIMIM) | 1 |
| 19 | Akhil Bharatiya Hindu Mahasabha (ABHM) | 1 |
| 20 | Congress (S) (Congress (S)) | 1 |
| 21 | Gorkha National Liberation Front (GNLF) | 1 |
| 22 | Indian Peoples' Front (IPF) | 1 |
| 23 | Kerala Congress (M) (KC(M)) | 1 |
| 24 | Maharashtrawadi Gomantak Party (MGP) | 1 |
| 25 | Marxist Coordination (MC) | 1 |
| 26 | Sikkim Sangram Parishad (SSP) | 1 |
