= Vaibhav Singh Yadav =

Professional boxer from India known as Ahir Boxe

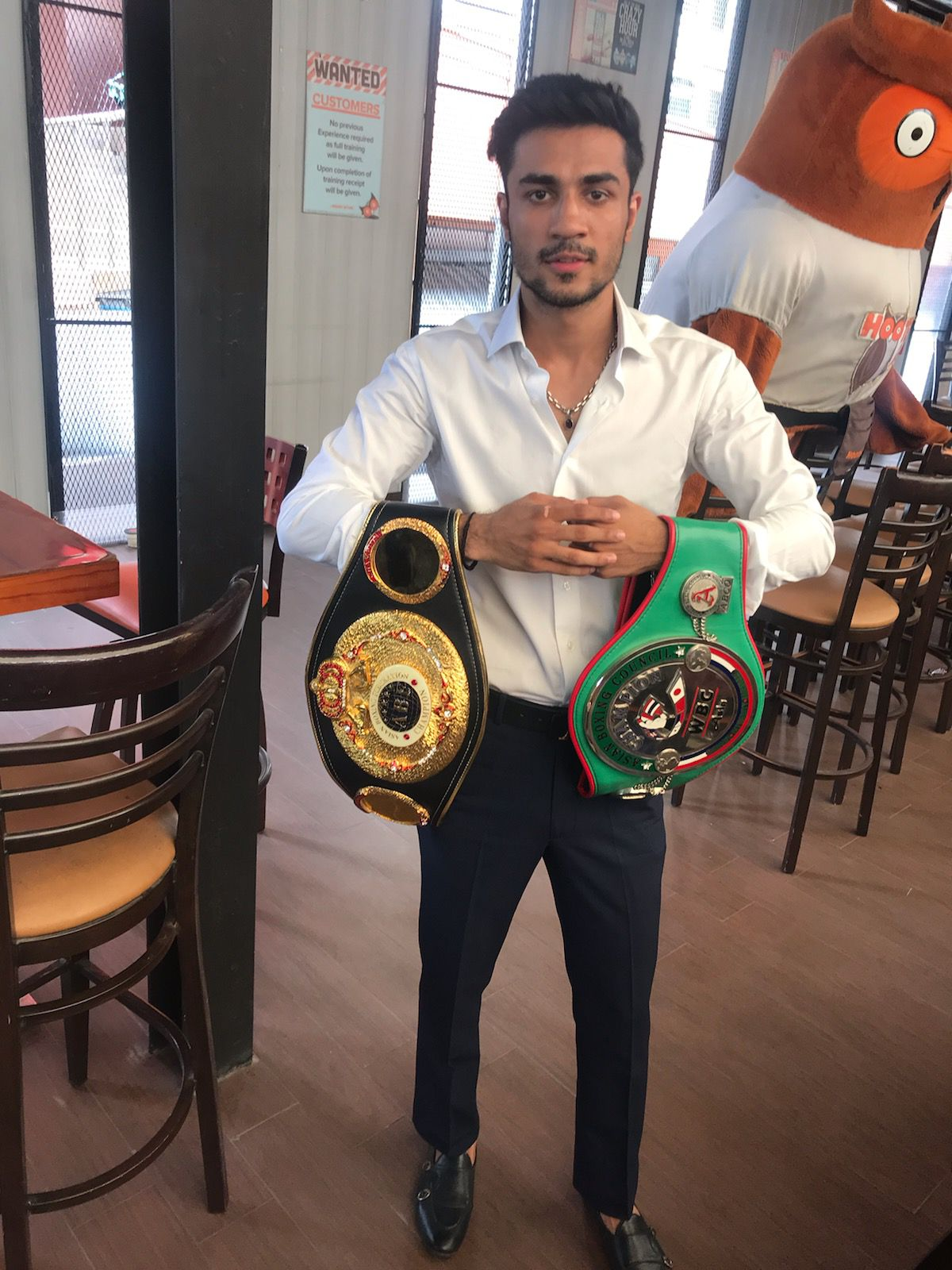
- Vaibhav Singh Yadav at Pattaya in 2019

Personal information
- Nationality: Indian
- Born: 8 March 1995 (age 31) New Delhi, India
- Height: 1.80 m (5 ft 11 in)
- Weight: 66.7 kg (147 lb)

Boxing career
- Weight class: Welterweight
- Stance: Southpaw

Boxing record
- Total fights: 13
- Wins: 11
- Win by KO: 7
- Losses: 2
- Draws: 0

Vaibhav Singh Yadav (also known as Ahir Boxer) is an Indian boxer from New Delhi. He became World Boxing Council (WBC) Asia silver welterweight champion after defeating Thailand's Fahpetch Singmanassak in 2019.

== Career ==
Yadav is the first Indian unified titles champion holder. He won this title after defeating Thailand's boxer Phongsathon Sompol by a 3rd-round knockout.

He won his American debut against William Parra Smith. He trains out of the Nonantum Boxing Club in Newton, MA and resides in Delhi, India.

=== Performance in Pro Boxing ===
- World Boxing Council (WBC) Asia silver title holder 2019
- ABF title holder 2019
- World Boxing Council (WBC) Asia silver title holder 2020
- ABF titles holder 2020

=== Total Numbers of Pro Fights ===
- Won -10
- Loss -2
- Knockouts -7
- Draw -0

In 2022 Vaibhav Singh Yadav was signed by LFG Boxing Management in Boston, Massachusetts. On 18 February 2023 he made his United States debut in a 6-round match on the “Turf War 4” card against William Parra Smith (4-13-1, 3 KOs), of Alaska and own the match.
