= Raghuvendra Singh Rathore =

Raghuvendra Singh Rathore (born 1 July 1953) is a former Indian judge at the Jaipur bench of Rajasthan High Court.

== Early life and education ==
Raghuvendra Singh Rathore was born on 1 July 1953. He went to Mayo College Ajmer for his schooling and passed out in the year 1970. Justice Rathore graduated from Kirori Mal College, New Delhi. After finishing B.A. (Hons.) Justice Rathore enrolled himself for education in Law and completed LL.B. from University of Rajasthan, Jaipur in 1977.

== Career ==
Rathore enrolled himself as Advocate with Bar Council of Rajasthan on 5 November 1977. Shri Rathore practised in civil criminal and constitutional branches of law. He was appointed as Additional Advocate General by the State Government of Rajasthan. He also represented a number of Government as well as non-Government Departments.

He was appointed to the National Green Tribunal in January 2016.

== Judgeship ==
On 5 July 2007 Justice Raghuvendra Singh Rathore was elevated an Additional Judge of Rajasthan High Court. Since then Justice Raghuvendra Singh Rathore is sitting at Jaipur bench of Rajasthan High Court.

== Controversy ==
In 2013, Rathore was reported to have been confining his 30-year old daughter at home in order to prevent her inter-caste marriage. The Supreme Court had to intervene and free her from unlawful detention.
