= Om Birla =

17th Speaker of the Lok Sabha since 2019

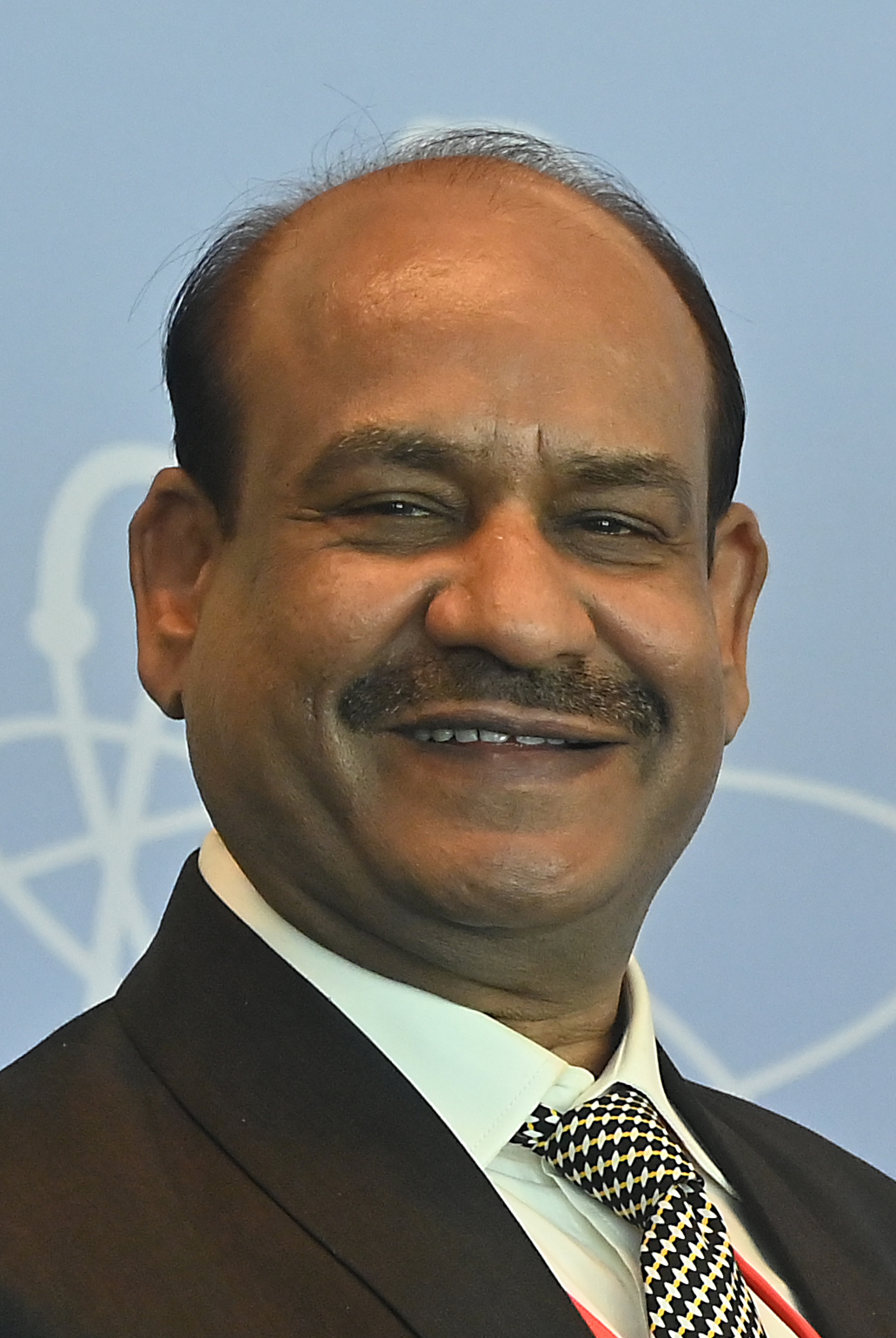
- Birla in 2021

Speaker of the Lok Sabha
- Incumbent
- Assumed office 19 June 2019
- President: Ram Nath Kovind; Droupadi Murmu
- Preceded by: Sumitra Mahajan (Note: Virendra Kumar Khatik and Bhartruhari Mahtab as Pro-tem speakers in 17th and 18th Lok Sabha)

Member of Parliament, Lok Sabha
- Incumbent
- Assumed office 16 May 2014
- Preceded by: Ijyaraj Singh
- Constituency: Kota, Rajasthan

Member of Rajasthan Legislative Assembly
- In office December 2003 – May 2014
- Preceded by: Shanti Kumar Dhariwal (from Kota before bifurcation)
- Succeeded by: Sandeep Sharma
- Constituency: Kota South

Personal details
- Born: 23 November 1962 (age 63) Kota, Rajasthan, India
- Party: Bharatiya Janata Party
- Spouse: Amita Birla (m. 1991)
- Children: 2
- Education: Government Commerce College, Kota; Maharshi Dayanand Saraswati University
- Occupation: Politician; businessperson
- Website: www.ombirla.in (in Hindi)

Om Birla (born 23 November 1962; Hindi pronunciation: [oːm bɪɾ.lɑː],[oːm bɪɽ.lɑː]) is an Indian politician from Rajasthan. He is currently serving as the 17th Speaker of the Lok Sabha since first being elected to that office in June 2019. He was re-elected for a second term on 26 June 2024. He serves as a Member of Parliament, Lok Sabha from Kota constituency in Rajasthan since 2014. In 2024, he became the first person in twenty years to be re-elected as an MP to the lower house, after serving as the Speaker of the Lok Sabha, and also one of only two MPs to be appointed the speaker twice.

He was a member of the Rajasthan Legislative Assembly representing Kota South Assembly constituency from 2003 to 2014. He is a member of the Bhartiya Janata Party. He won the 2024 Lok Sabha Speaker Election as NDA candidate. Birla is a three-time MP from Kota Lok Sabha constituency.

== Early life ==
Om Birla was born to Shrikrishna Birla and Shakuntala Devi in a Marwari Hindu family. He completed his master's degree in commerce from Government Commerce College, Kota, and Maharshi Dayanand Saraswati University, Ajmer. He married Amita Birla in 1991 and has two daughters, Akansha and Anjali.

== Political career ==
=== Legislative Assembly ===
Om Birla won his first assembly elections contesting from Kota South in 2003. He defeated Shanti Dhariwal from Congress by a margin of 10,101 votes. In the next assembly elections, he defended his seat with a comfortable margin of 24,300 votes to his nearest opponent Ram Kishan Verma from Congress in 2008. Before becoming an MP, he won his third assembly election against Pankaj Mehta (Congress) by close to 50,000 votes in 2013. During his tenure in 2003–08, he was the Parliamentary Secretary (MoS rank) in Rajasthan Government.

=== Member of Parliament ===
As the BJP candidate for the Kota constituency, Birla was elected to the 16th, 17th and 18th Lok Sabha.

In the 16th Lok Sabha, he was a member of the Standing Committee on Energy and Consultative Committee for the Ministry of Social Justice and Empowerment.

His selection for the post of the Speaker of the Lok Sabha for the first time was unexpected. He was elected as speaker for the second time in June 2024.

=== Speaker of the Lok Sabha ===
On 19 June 2019, Birla was elected Speaker of the 17th Lok Sabha, following a motion for election moved by Prime Minister Modi of the Bharatiya Janata Party. In his first tenure, many bills were passed by the house during that time. He was criticised by many MPs during an event of mass-suspension of opposition MPs on 13 December 2023 because of disrupting parliamentary business. He won the 2024 Lok Sabha Speaker Election as NDA candidate by voice vote, by which, Birla became the Speaker of the Lok Sabha for the second consecutive time in the 18th Lok Sabha. A no-confidence motion seeking the removal of Speaker Birla from his office in the Lok Sabha was proposed by members of the principal opposition INDIA Alliance. In accordance with parliamentary rules, a formal notice was submitted to Lok Sabha Secretary-General Utpal Kumar Singh on 10 February 2026, bearing the signatures of around 119 opposition MPs.

Under Article 94 of the Constitution of India, a 14-day prior notice must be given to the sitting Speaker before such a resolution can be taken up in the House. Following this requirement, the resolution was scheduled to be moved in the Lok Sabha by Kishanganj MP Mohammad Jawed on 10 March 2026, which was defeated by a voice vote on 11 March 2026, after a long 10-hour debate.

== Positions held ==
- District President, Bhartiya Janta Yuva Morcha, Kota (1987–91)
- State President, Bhartiya Janta Yuva Morcha, Rajasthan (1991–1997)
- Vice Chairman, National Co-operative Consumer Federation Limited
- Chairman, CONFED, Jaipur (June 1992 to June 1995)
- National Vice President, Bhartiya Janta Yuva Morcha (1997–2003)
- Member of Legislative Assembly for Kota South (2003–2014)
- Member of Parliament for Kota (since 2014)
- Speaker of the 17th Lok Sabha (from 19 June 2019 to 3 March 2024)
- Speaker of the 18th Lok Sabha (since 26 June 2024)

== Notes ==
Lok Sabha
Preceded by Ijyaraj Singh	Member of Parliament for Kota; 2014–present	Incumbent
Political offices
Preceded by Sumitra Mahajan	Speaker of the Lok Sabha; 2019–present	Incumbent
