= Deputy Chairman of the Rajya Sabha =

Second highest authority of the upper house of the Parliament of India

- Rājya Sabhā kē Upāsabhāpati
- Rajya Sabha (Council of States)

- Flag of India

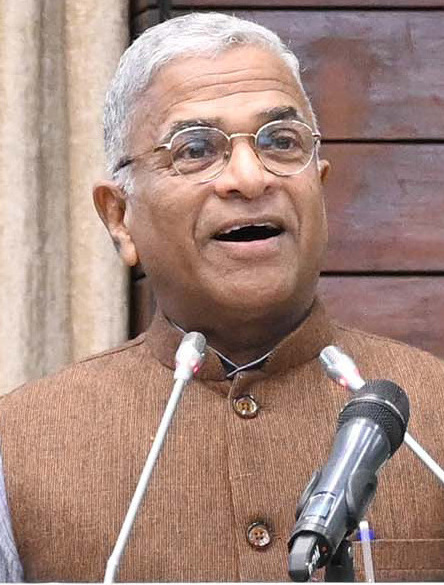
- Incumbent; Harivansh Narayan Singh since 9 August 2018
- Reports to: Chairman of the Rajya Sabha
- Formation: 31 May 1952; 74 years ago
- First holder: S. V. Krishnamoorthy Rao
- Website: sansad.in

The deputy chairman of the Rajya Sabha is the second-highest-ranking authority of the Rajya Sabha, the upper house of the parliament of India. He acts as the presiding authority in the event of leave or absence caused by the death or illness of the chairman of the Rajya Sabha. As per Article 89 of the constitution, the Rajya Sabha (Council of States) is required to choose a member to be the deputy chairman whenever the office becomes vacant. However, the article does not stipulate a specific timeframe for this election. Additionally, it is a parliamentary convention to elect the deputy chairman from a party apart from the ruling party, ensuring a more accountable and democratic parliamentary system.

The deputy chairman of the Rajya Sabha is elected among the members of parliament. He is elected by a simple majority of those present and voting. The chairman fixes the date for electing the deputy chairman, and there is no need for a separate oath. Since 1952, the Rajya Sabha has had 12 deputy chairmen. The longest-serving deputy chairman is Najma Heptulla from the Indian National Congress, who held the office for over sixteen years across multiple tenures. Following her, S. V. Krishnamoorthy Rao and K. Rahman Khan from the same party are the second and third longest-serving deputy chairmen respectively. Harivansh made history as the first-ever nominated member to hold the position.

The current incumbent is the nominated member Harivansh since 17 April 2026.

== List ==
Key

- ^{RES} Resigned
- ^{§} Returned to office after a previous non-consecutive term

INC (9) IND (1) JD(U) (1) NOM (1) RPI (1)
| No. | Portrait | Name (Birth–Death) | Elected from | Term of office (Note: The ordinal number of the term being served by the person specified in the row in the corresponding period) | | | Election | Political party (Note: This column only names the deputy chairman's party. The deputy chairman may elected by coalition of several parties and independents; these are not listed here.) | Chairman |
| No. | Portrait | Name (Birth–Death) | Elected from | Assumed office | Left office | Time in office | Election | Political party | Chairman |
|---|---|---|---|---|---|---|---|---|---|
| 1 | | S. V. Krishnamoorthy Rao (1902–1968) | Karnataka | 31 May 1952 | 2 April 1956 | 9 years, 252 days | 1952 | Indian National Congress | Sarvepalli Radhakrishnan |
| 1 | | S. V. Krishnamoorthy Rao (1902–1968) | Karnataka | 25 April 1956 | 1 March 1962^{[RES]} | 9 years, 252 days | 1956 | Indian National Congress | Sarvepalli Radhakrishnan |
| 2 | | Violet Alva (1908–1969) | Gujarat | 19 April 1962 | 2 April 1966 | 7 years, 206 days | 1960 | Indian National Congress | Sarvepalli Radhakrishnan Zakir Husain Varahagiri Venkata Giri Gopal Swarup Pathak |
| 2 | | Violet Alva (1908–1969) | Gujarat | 7 April 1966 | 16 November 1969^{[RES]} | 7 years, 206 days | 1966 | Indian National Congress | Sarvepalli Radhakrishnan Zakir Husain Varahagiri Venkata Giri Gopal Swarup Pathak |
| 3 | | Bhaurao Dewaji Khobragade (1925–1984) | Maharashtra | 17 December 1969 | 2 April 1972 | 2 years, 107 days | 1966 | Republican Party of India | Gopal Swarup Pathak |
| 4 | | Godey Murahari (1926–1982) | Uttar Pradesh | 13 April 1972 | 2 April 1974 | 4 years, 317 days | 1968 | Independent | Gopal Swarup Pathak B. D. Jatti |
| 4 | | Godey Murahari (1926–1982) | Uttar Pradesh | 26 April 1974 | 20 March 1977^{[RES]} | 4 years, 317 days | 1974 | Independent | Gopal Swarup Pathak B. D. Jatti |
| 5 | | Ram Niwas Mirdha (1924–2010) | Rajasthan | 30 March 1977 | 2 April 1980 | 3 years, 3 days | 1974 | Indian National Congress | B. D. Jatti M. Hidayatullah |
| 6 | | Shyam Lal Yadav (1927–2005) | Uttar Pradesh | 30 July 1980 | 2 April 1982 | 4 years, 126 days | 1976 | Indian National Congress | M. Hidayatullah R. Venkataraman |
| 6 | | Shyam Lal Yadav (1927–2005) | Uttar Pradesh | 28 April 1982 | 29 December 1984^{[RES]} | 4 years, 126 days | 1982 | Indian National Congress | M. Hidayatullah R. Venkataraman |
| 7 | | Najma Heptulla (b. 1940) | Maharashtra | 25 January 1985 | 20 January 1986^{[RES]} | 360 days | 1980 | Indian National Congress | R. Venkataraman |
| 8 | | M. M. Jacob (1926–2018) | Keralam | 26 February 1986 | 22 October 1986^{[RES]} | 238 days | 1982 | Indian National Congress | R. Venkataraman |
| 9 | | Pratibha Devisingh Patil (b. 1934) | Maharashtra | 18 November 1986 | 5 November 1988^{[RES]} | 1 year, 353 days | 1985 | Indian National Congress | R. Venkataraman Shanker Dayal Sharma |
| (7) | | Najma Heptulla (b. 1940) | Maharashtra | 18 November 1988^{[§]} | 4 July 1992 | 15 years, 195 days | 1986 | Indian National Congress | Shanker Dayal Sharma K. R. Narayanan Krishan Kant Bhairon Singh Shekhawat |
| (7) | | Najma Heptulla (b. 1940) | Maharashtra | 10 July 1992 | 4 July 1998 | 15 years, 195 days | 1992 | Indian National Congress | Shanker Dayal Sharma K. R. Narayanan Krishan Kant Bhairon Singh Shekhawat |
| (7) | | Najma Heptulla (b. 1940) | Maharashtra | 9 July 1998 | 10 June 2004^{[RES]} | 15 years, 195 days | 1998 | Indian National Congress | Shanker Dayal Sharma K. R. Narayanan Krishan Kant Bhairon Singh Shekhawat |
| 10 | | K. Rahman Khan (b. 1939) | Karnataka | 22 July 2004 | 2 April 2006 | 7 years, 215 days | 2000 | Indian National Congress | Bhairon Singh Shekhawat Mohammad Hamid Ansari |
| 10 | | K. Rahman Khan (b. 1939) | Karnataka | 12 May 2006 | 2 April 2012 | 7 years, 215 days | 2006 | Indian National Congress | Bhairon Singh Shekhawat Mohammad Hamid Ansari |
| 11 | | P. J. Kurien (b. 1941) | Keralam | 21 August 2012 | 1 July 2018 | 5 years, 314 days | 2012 | Indian National Congress | Mohammad Hamid Ansari M. Venkaiah Naidu |
| 12 | | Harivansh (b. 1956) | Bihar | 9 August 2018 | 9 April 2020 | 7 years, 229 days | 2014 | Janata Dal (United) | M. Venkaiah Naidu Jagdeep Dhankhar C. P. Radhakrishnan |
| 12 | | Harivansh (b. 1956) | Bihar | 14 September 2020 | 9 April 2026 | 7 years, 229 days | 2020 | Janata Dal (United) | M. Venkaiah Naidu Jagdeep Dhankhar C. P. Radhakrishnan |
| 12 | | Harivansh (b. 1956) | Nominated | 17 April 2026 | Incumbent | 7 years, 229 days | 2026 | Nominated | M. Venkaiah Naidu Jagdeep Dhankhar C. P. Radhakrishnan |

Timeline

== Statistics ==
List of deputy chairmen by length of term

| No. | Name | Party | Length of term | |
| No. | Name | Party | Longest continuous term | Total duration of deputy chairmanship |
|---|---|---|---|---|
| 1 | Najma Heptulla | INC | 15 years, 195 days | 16 years, 190 days |
| 2 | S. V. Krishnamoorthy Rao | INC | 9 years, 252 days | 9 years, 252 days |
| 3 | K. Rahman Khan | INC | 7 years, 215 days | 7 years, 215 days |
| 4 | Violet Alva | INC | 7 years, 206 days | 7 years, 206 days |
| 5 | Harivansh | NOM/JD(U) | 7 years, 229 days | 7 years, 229 days |
| 6 | P. J. Kurien | INC | 5 years, 314 days | 5 years, 314 days |
| 7 | Godey Murahari | IND | 4 years, 317 days | 4 years, 317 days |
| 8 | Shyam Lal Yadav | INC | 4 years, 126 days | 4 years, 126 days |
| 9 | Ram Niwas Mirdha | INC | 3 years, 3 days | 3 years, 3 days |
| 10 | Bhaurao Dewaji Khobragade | RPI | 2 years, 107 days | 2 years, 107 days |
| 11 | Pratibha Devisingh Patil | INC | 1 year, 353 days | 1 year, 353 days |
| 12 | M. M. Jacob | INC | 238 days | 238 days |

List by party

Parties by total time-span of their member holding DCO (7 September 2026)
| No. | Political party | Number of deputy chairmen | Total days of holding DCO |
|---|---|---|---|
| 1 | Indian National Congress | 9 | 20886 days |
| 2 | Janata Dal (United) | 1 | 2642 days |
| 3 | Independent | 1 | 1778 days |
| 4 | Republican Party of India | 1 | 837 days |
| 5 | Nominated | 1 | 143 days |

Parties by total duration (in days) of holding Deputy Chairman's Office

- INC
- JD(U)
- IND
- RPI
- NOM

== See also ==
- Speaker of the Lok Sabha
- Chairman of the Rajya Sabha
- Deputy Speaker of the Lok Sabha
- Leader of the House in Lok Sabha
- Leader of the House in Rajya Sabha
- Secretary General of the Rajya Sabha
- Leader of the Opposition in Lok Sabha
- Leader of the Opposition in Rajya Sabha
