= 1974 Rajya Sabha elections =

Rajya Sabha elections were held in 1974, to elect members of the Rajya Sabha, Indian Parliament's upper chamber.

== Elections ==
Elections were held in 1974 to elect members from various states. The list is incomplete.

=== Members elected ===
The following members are elected in the elections held in 1974. They are members for the term 1974-80 and retire in year 1980, except in case of the resignation or death before the term.

State - Member - Party

Rajya Sabha members for term 1974-1980
| State | Member Name | Party | Remark |
|---|---|---|---|
| Andhra Pradesh | M Anandam | INC | R |
| Andhra Pradesh | V C Keshava Rao | INC | |
| Andhra Pradesh | K V Raghunatha Reddy | INC | |
| Andhra Pradesh | K Brahamananda Reddy | INC | 20/03/1977 |
| Andhra Pradesh | R Narsimha Reddy | INC | |
| Andhra Pradesh | M Y Saleem | INC | |
| Assam | D K Borooah | INC | 21/03/1977 |
| Assam | Sriman Prafulla Goswami | INC | |
| Bihar | Kamalnath Jha | INC | 09/01/1980 LS |
| Bihar | Sitaram Kesari | INC | |
| Bihar | Indradeep Sinha | CPI | |
| Bihar | Rajendra Kumar Poddar | IND | |
| Bihar | Dr Chandramanilal Chaudhary | INC | dea 08/02/1979 |
| Bihar | Kameshwar Singh | INC | |
| Bihar | Dr Ramkripal Sinha | JAN | |
| Delhi | Khurshed Alam Khan | INC | |
| Haryana | Sultan Singh | INC | |
| Haryana | Parbha Singh | JAN | |
| Himachal Pradesh | Gian Chand Totu | INC | |
| Jammu and Kashmir | Nizam-Ud-Din Syed | JAN | |
| Kerala | B. V. Abdulla Koya | ML | |
| Kerala | Leena D Menon | INC | |
| Kerala | Viswanatha Menon | INC | |
| Karnataka | Margaret Alva | INC | |
| Karnataka | M L Kollur | INC | |
| Karnataka | U K Lakshmana Gowda | IND | |
| Karnataka | B Rachaiah | INC | 21/03/1977 |
| Madhya Pradesh | Maimoona Sultan | INC | |
| Madhya Pradesh | N P Chaudhari | INC | |
| Madhya Pradesh | Shyamkumari Devi | INC | |
| Madhya Pradesh | Jagdish Joshi | INC | |
| Madhya Pradesh | Bhairon Singh Shekhawat | JS | res 05/12/1977 |
| Maharashtra | R D Jagtap Avergaonkar | INC | |
| Maharashtra | S W Dhabe | INC | |
| Maharashtra | Prof N M Kamble | INC | res 09/08/1988 |
| Maharashtra | J S Tilak | INC | |
| Maharashtra | Krishnarao N Dhulap | OTH | |
| Maharashtra | Deorao Patil | INC | dea 22/10/1978 |
| Nagaland | Khyomo Lotha | INC | |
| Nominated | Dr Lokesh Chandra | NOM | |
| Nominated | Scato Swu | NOM | |
| Nominated | Dr Vidya Prakash Dutt | NOM | |
| Nominated | Krishna Kriplani | NOM | |
| Orissa | Bhairab Chandra Mahanti | INC | |
| Orissa | Lakshmana Mahapatro | CPI | |
| Orissa | Rabi Ray | LD | |
| Punjab | Gurmukh Singh Musafir | INC | dea 18/01/1976 |
| Punjab | Jagat Singh Anand | CPI | |
| Punjab | Parbhu Singh | CPI | |
| Rajashtan | Ram Niwas Mirdha | INC | |
| Rajashtan | Rishi Kumar Mishra | INC | |
| Rajashtan | Nathi Singh | INC | |
| Rajashtan | Kishan Lal Sharma | INC | |
| Tamil Nadu | M. Kadharsha | DMK | |
| Tamil Nadu | Valampuri John | INC | Disq 14/10/1974 |
| Tamil Nadu | H A Khaja Mohideen | ML | |
| Tamil Nadu | G Lakshmanan | DMK | res 08/01/1980 LS |
| Tamil Nadu | C D Natarajan | DMK | |
| Tamil Nadu | S Ranganathan | IND | |
| Tripura | Bir Chandra DebBurman | CPI | |
| Uttar Pradesh | Godey Murahari | IND | 20/03/1977 LS |
| Uttar Pradesh | Chandra Shekhar | INC | 22/03/1977 |
| Uttar Pradesh | Piare Lall Kureel | INC | |
| Uttar Pradesh | Kalpnath Rai | INC | |
| Uttar Pradesh | S A Hashmi | INC | |
| Uttar Pradesh | Raj Narain | OTH | 21/03/1977 |
| Uttar Pradesh | Shiv Dayal Singh Chaurasia | INC | |
| Uttar Pradesh | Devendra Nath Dwivedi | INC | |
| Uttar Pradesh | Jagbir Singh | OTH | |
| Uttar Pradesh | Prakash Veer Shastri | JS | dea 23/11/1977 |
| Uttar Pradesh | Mahadeo Prasad Varma | JAN | |

== Bye-elections ==
The following bye elections were held in the year 1974.

State - Member - Party

1. Manipur - Irengbam Tompok Singh - INC ( ele 18/06/1974 term till 1978 )
2. Punjab - Niranjan Singh Talib - INC ( ele 16/07/1974 term till 1978 ) dea 28/05/1976
