= Noida Media Club =

Organisation of journalists in the Delhi National Capital Region of India

Noida Media Club (NMC) is a social organization of journalists from Noida and across Delhi-NCR in India. Alok Kumar Dwivedi is the elected President of it who won the elections unopposed in the year 2025. The organization's motto संगच्छध्वं संवदध्वं is taken from the Rigveda. The meaning of the motto is "We all go together, speak together, let our minds be one".

== Social Contribution ==
The objective of the organization is to protect the social, economic and professional rights of journalists. The institution is making efforts to strengthen the professional skills of journalists working in Noida and Delhi-NCR and want to play an active role in making Noida a better city.

== Free Speech Magazine ==
The Free Speech Magazine is the bilingual (Hindi and English) mouthpiece of NMC. A half early publication of the organization and contains articles from various fraternities such as journalists, peace makers, businessmen, civil servants, politicians and social workers.

The first edition of the magazine was released by Harivansh Narayan Singh, the Deputy Chairman of Rajya Sabha on 2 October 2019 on the occasion 150th birthday anniversary of Mahatma Gandhi.

== Free Speech Award ==
NMC established the Free Speech Award to recognise journalists whom the organisation considers are contributing outstanding efforts in journalism. Awarded annually, the award has two categories - journalists and photo journalists - with Gold, Silver and Bronze given in each.

== Journalist's Memorial ==
NMC has constructed a national memorial dedicated to journalists who lost their lives in line of duty during the COVID-19 pandemic. The foundation stone of the memorial was laid on January 2, 2022. Names of 497 such journalists, including those from print, digital and video, inscribed on memorial pillars at the site located in Sector 72 of Noida. The memorial has been inaugurated on October 2, 2023 on occasion of Gandhi Jayanti. The names of journalists like Rohit Sardana, Shesh Narayan Singh and Rajkumar Keswani, who has frequently written on the Bhopal gas tragedy, have been engraved on the memorial. The memorial was jointly inaugurated by senior journalists Vinod Agnihotri, Vishnu Tripathi and Dr.Arunvir Singh, Chief Executive Officer of Yamuna Expressway Industrial Development Authority. On this occasion, journalists from across the country including Bharatiya Kisan Union spokesperson Rakesh Tikait, former Uttar Pradesh Chief Minister Akhilesh Yadav, Rashtriya Lok Dal President Jayant Chaudhary, Bharatiya Janata Party Western Uttar Pradesh President Satendra Shishodia and Union Minister Bhanu Pratap Singh Verma were present.
