= B. D. Khobragade =

Indian politician, barrister and Ambedkarite activist

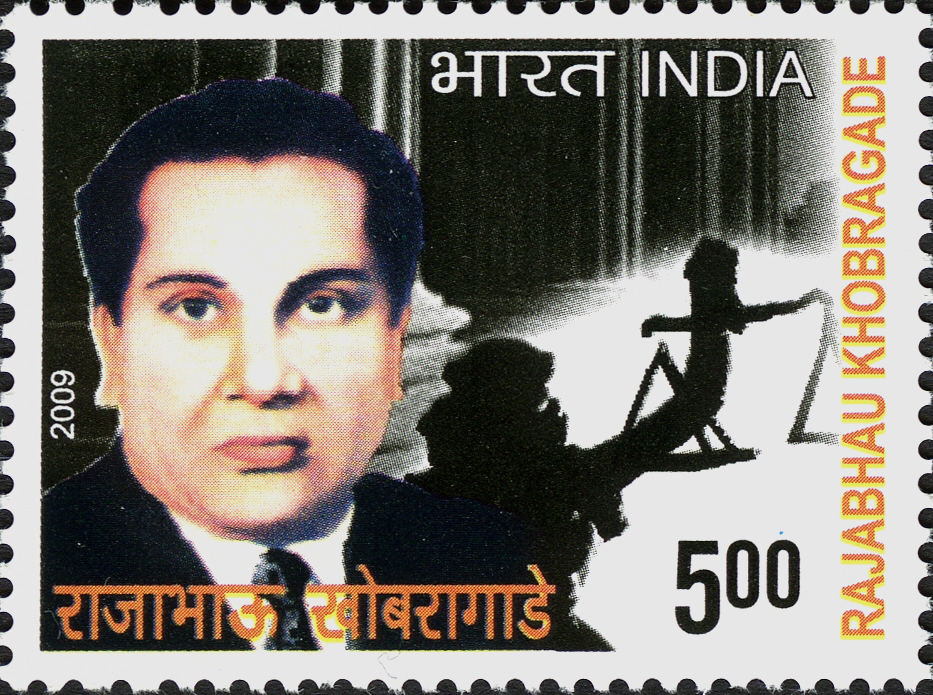
- Khobragade 2009 stamp of India

3rd Deputy Chairman of the Rajya Sabha
- In office 17 December 1969 – 2 April 1972
- Preceded by: Violet Alva
- Succeeded by: Godey Murahari

Member of the Rajya Sabha for Maharashtra
- In office 3 April 1958 – 2 April 1984
- Chairman: V. V. Giri; Gopal Swarup Pathak

Personal details
- Born: 25 September 1925 Chandrapur, Bombay Presidency, British India (present-day Maharashtra, India)
- Died: 9 April 1984 (aged 58)
- Party: • Republican Party of India • All Indian Republican Party
- Spouse: Indumati Khobragade
- Occupation: Lawyer; Social activist; Politician
- Known for: Activism in Ambedkarite movement and Deputy Chairman of the Rajya Sabha

Bhaurao Dewaji Khobragade (25 September 1925 – 9 April 1984), commonly known as Rajabhau Khobragade, was an Indian barrister, social activist and politician. He was a member of the Rajya Sabha of the Parliament of India at various times from 1958 to 1984. He was Deputy Chairman of the Rajya Sabha from 1969 to 1972. Khobragade was an Ambedkarite and leader of Republican Party of India (RPI). He hailed from the Mahar (Scheduled Caste) community and, in 1956 converted to Buddhism along with B. R. Ambedkar.

== Early life ==
Khobragade had his early education at Jubilee High School, Chandrapur. He then went on to clear the Inter Science exam from Nagpur Science College in 1943 and B.A. exam from Morris College, Nagpur in 1945. On the advice of Dr. Ambedkar, he went to London to study law in 1950. He was one of the 16 students Dr. Ambedkar sent to London to study but was an exception as he went to London bearing his own expenses and the rest were scholarship students.

The All Indian Republican Party is a political party in India, a splinter group of the Republican Party of India and named for its leader, B. D. Khobragade. Barrister Rajabhau Khobragade's grandson Rajas Khobragade leading his movement.

== Honors ==
Indian Post issued a stamp dedicated to Khobragade in 2009.
