= Shyam Lal Yadav =

Indian politician

Member of Parliament, Lok Sabha
- In office 29 December 1984 - 26 November 1989 (8th Lok Sabha)
- Preceded by: Kamalapati Tripathi
- Succeeded by: Anil Kumar Shastri
- Constituency: Varanasi, Uttar Pradesh

6th Deputy Chairman of the Rajya Sabha
- In office 28 April 1982 – 29 December 1984
- Preceded by: Himself
- Succeeded by: Najma Heptullah
- In office 30 July 1980 – 4 April 1982
- Preceded by: Ram Niwas Mirdha
- Succeeded by: Himself
- Chairman: Mohammed Hidtayullah

Personal details
- Born: Varanasi, (Uttar Pradesh).
- Died: 6 May 2005 (aged 78). Varanasi, (Uttar Pradesh).
- Citizenship: India
- Party: Congress (I).
- Children: Prof. Raj Yadav; Arun Yadav
- Occupation: Advocate.
- Profession: Advocate, Politician

Shyam Lal Yadav (1 May 1927 – 6 May 2005) was an Indian politician. He was the Deputy Chairman of the Rajya Sabha and was Member of Parliament in the 8th Lok Sabha. Yadav represented the Varanasi constituency of Uttar Pradesh and was a member of the Indian National Congress (INC) political party.

== Background ==
Yadav was born in Varanasi, Uttar Pradesh. Yadav was an advocate by profession. In his early years, he held various non-political posts. He was Director, District Cooperative Development Federation (Varanasi); Member, UP Harijan Welfare Board and President, Uttar Pradesh Government Hindi Samiti. He has also been the President of All-India Yadav Mahasabha.

== Politics ==
Shyam Lal Yadav entered politics shortly after Indian Independence. During his political career, He was first elected assembly member from Mughalsarai of the then Varanasi district (now Chandauli) in 1957 as an Indian National Congress candidate. In 1967, he left Indian National Congress along with Chaudhary Charan Singh and was elected MLA from Mughalsarai as a candidate of Bharatiya Kranti Dal and when Chaudhary Charan Singh became the Chief Minister of Uttar Pradesh for the first time in April 1967, he became first time Minister of in his government. He served as Cabinet Minister of important portfolios like Industries, Information, Law, Food and Civil Supplies and Parliamentary Affairs. Later, he rejoined the Indian National Congress.In 1970, he was elected Rajya Sabha member from Uttar Pradesh and reelected to the Raj Sabha for the second time 1976.In 1982, he was elected to the Rajya Sabha for the third time and was elected the Deputy Chairman of the Rajya Sabha in the same year and when Rajiv Gandhi became the Prime Minister after the assassination of Indira Gandhi, he was very close to her. In the 1984 Lok Sabha elections, on the instructions of Rajiv Gandhi, he was Resigned from the post of Deputy Chairman of Rajya Sabha and contested elections in place of Kamlapati Tripathi from Varanasi Lok Sabha constituency and got elected by getting 40.7% votes.

== Commonwealth Parliamentary Association ==
Yadav was a member of Indian Parliamentary Delegation to the 19th (1973) & 30th (1984) Commonwealth Parliamentary Conference that were held in London & Isle of Man respectively.

=== Inter-Parliamentary Conferences ===
Yadav also participated in the Inter-Parliamentary Conferences as a member of Indian Parliamentary Delegation. He attended 68th (1981) & 69th (1982) conferences held in Havana & Rome respectively.

== Posts Held ==
#	From	To	Position
01	1957	1962	Member, Uttar Pradesh Legislative Assembly
02	1967	1968	Member, Uttar Pradesh Legislative Assembly
03	1967	1968	Minister of Law, Uttar Pradesh Legislative Assembly
04	1967	1968	Parliamentary Affairs Minister, Uttar Pradesh Legislative Assembly
05	1967	1968	Minister of Food and Civil Supplies, Uttar Pradesh Legislative Assembly
06	1967	1968	Minister of Industries, Uttar Pradesh Legislative Assembly
08	1970	1984	Member, Rajya Sabha
09	1980	1984	Deputy Chairman of the Rajya Sabha
10	1984	1989	Elected to 8th Lok Sabha
12	1988	1989	Union Minister of State for Agriculture and Cooperation.

== See also ==
- 8th Lok Sabha
- List of members of the Rajya Sabha
- Politics of India
- Parliament of India
- Government of India
- Varanasi (Lok Sabha constituency)
- Commonwealth Parliamentary Association
- Deputy Chairman of the Rajya Sabha
