= Speaker of the Lok Sabha =

Highest authority of the lower house of the Parliament of India

- Lok Sabhā Adhyakṣa
- Lok Sabha (House of the People)

- Flag of India

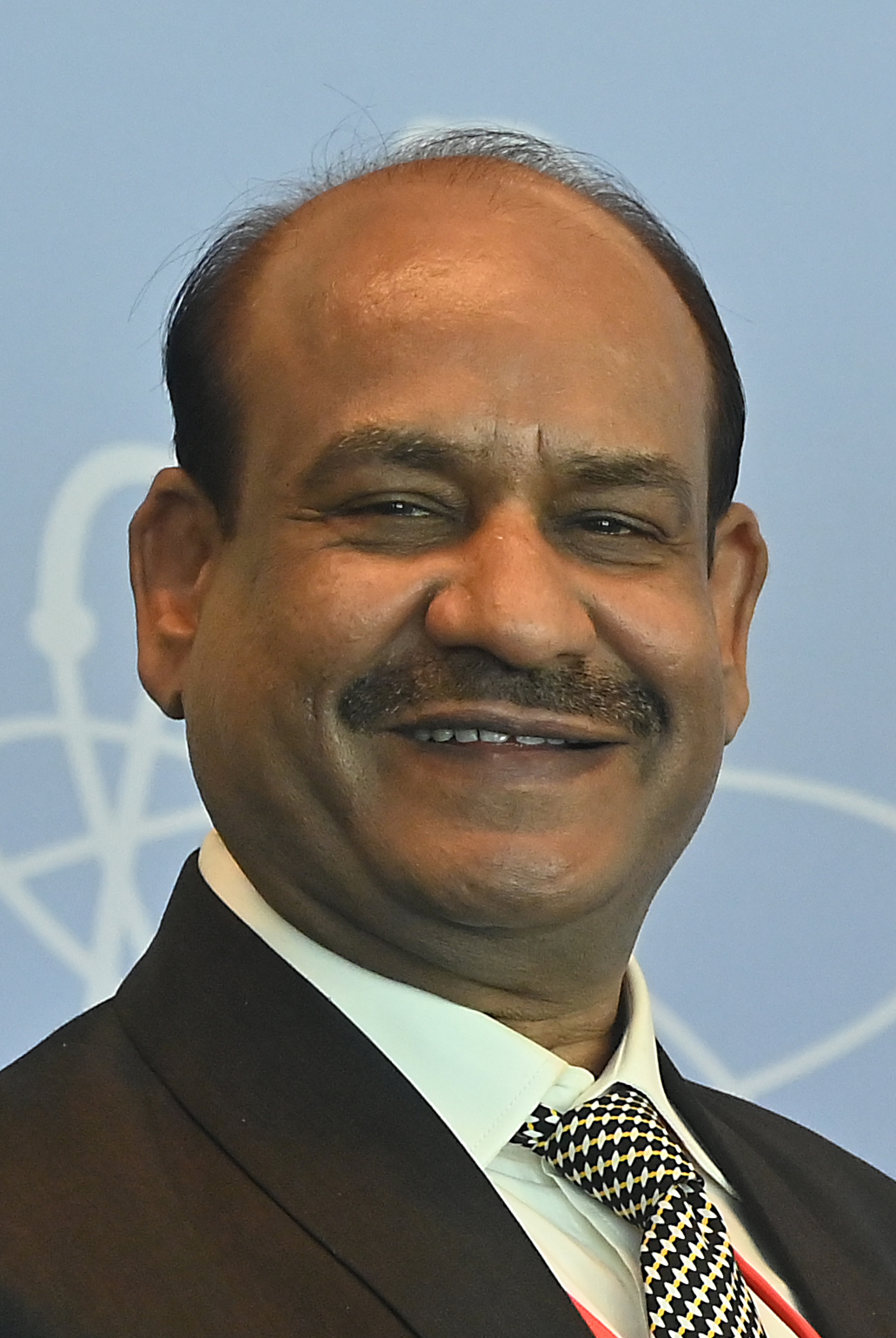
- Incumbent; Om Birla since 19 June 2019
- Lok Sabha
- Style: Honourable (inside India); His/Her Excellency (outside India)
- Type: Speaker
- Status: Presiding officer of the Lok Sabha; Cabinet Rank position
- Member of: Lok Sabha
- Reports to: Parliament of India
- Residence: 20, Akbar Road, New Delhi
- Seat: Sansad Bhavan, New Delhi
- Appointer: All Members of Parliament in Lok Sabha
- Term length: During the life of the Lok Sabha (five years maximum; renewable)
- Constituting instrument: Article 93 of the Constitution of India
- Precursor: President of the Constituent Assembly of India
- Inaugural holder: Ganesh Vasudev Mavalankar (1952–1956)
- Formation: 15 May 1952
- Deputy: Deputy Speaker of the Lok Sabha
- Salary: • ₹450,000 (US$4,700) (per month) • ₹5,400,000 (US$56,000) (annually)
- Website: speakerloksabha.nic.in

The Speaker of the Lok Sabha (IAST: Lok Sabhā Adhyakṣa) is the presiding officer and the highest authority of the Lok Sabha, the lower house of the Parliament of India. The speaker is elected generally in the first meeting of the Lok Sabha following a general election and ranks 6th in the Order of precedence in India.

The speaker does not enjoy security of tenure and their term is subject to the pleasure of the house i.e. they can be removed anytime by a resolution of the Lok Sabha by a majority of the all the Members of the house. The longest-serving speaker was Balram Jakhar, whose tenure lasted for 9 years and 329 days.

== Election of the speaker ==
Newly elected Members of Parliament from the Lok Sabha elect the Speaker among themselves. The Speaker should be someone who understands how the Lok Sabha functions and the speaker should be someone accepted among the ruling and opposition parties.

After the general elections, the President of India notifies the first meeting of the Lok Sabha as well as the date for the election of the Speaker. Generally either on the day of the election of the Speaker or a day before it, the Prime Minister or the Minister of Parliamentary Affairs proposes the name of the candidate. Any other candidate may also submit their names . There have been four instances viz. 1952, 1967, 1976, and 2024 when there were elections to the speaker post. If only one name is proposed, the Speaker is elected without any formal vote. However, if more than one nomination is received, a division is called through voice voting by all members. The successful candidate is elected as Speaker of the Lok Sabha.

== Powers and functions of the speaker ==
The Speaker of the Lok Sabha conducts the business in house, and decides whether a bill is a money bill or not. They maintain discipline and decorum in the house and can punish a member for unruly behaviour with respect to law after suspending them. They also permit the moving of various kinds of motions and resolutions such as a motion of no confidence, motion of adjournment, motion of censure and calling attention notice as per the rules. The Speaker decides on the agenda to be taken up for discussion during the meeting. The date of election of the Speaker is fixed by the President. Further, all comments and speeches made by members of the House are addressed to the Speaker. The Speaker also presides over the joint sitting of both houses of the Parliament of India. The counterpart of the Speaker in the Rajya Sabha (Council of the States) is its Chairperson; the Vice-President of India is the ex-officio chairperson of the Rajya Sabha. On the order of precedence, the Speaker of Lok Sabha ranks sixth, along with the Chief Justice of India. The Speaker is answerable to the House. Both the Speaker and Deputy Speaker may be removed by a resolution passed by the majority of the members. Lok Sabha Speaker can be elected by President on a nomination basis.

All bills passed requires the speaker's signature to go to the Rajya Sabha for its consideration. The Speaker also has a casting vote in the event of a tie. It is customary for the Presiding Officer to exercise the casting vote in such a manner as to maintain the status quo.

== Removal of the speaker ==
Speaker can be removed by the Lok Sabha by a resolution passed by the majority of all the then members of the house as per Constitution of India [Articles 94].

The Speaker is also removed on being disqualified for being Lok Sabha member under sections 7 and 8 of Representation of the People Act, 1951.

== Pro tem speaker ==
After a general election and formation of a new government, a list of senior Lok Sabha members prepared by the Legislative Section is submitted to the Minister of Parliamentary Affairs, who forwards the name to the President of India. The President of India appoints the pro tem Speaker.

The first meeting after the election when the Speaker and the Deputy Speaker are selected by members of the Parliament is held under the pro tem Speaker. In absence of the Speaker, the Deputy Speaker acts as Speaker and in the absence of both a committee of six members selected by the Speaker will act as Speaker according to their seniority.

Eligibility for Speaker of the Lok Sabha include:

- Being a citizen of India;
- Not be less than 25 years of age;
- Not holding any office of profit under the Government of India, or a state government; and
- Not being a Criminal Offender.

=== List of pro tem speakers ===
| No. | Portrait | Speaker (Birth-Death) | Constituency | Term of office | | | Political party | Lok Sabha | Minister of Parliamentary Affairs |
| No. | Portrait | Speaker (Birth-Death) | Constituency | From | To | Period | Political party | Lok Sabha | Minister of Parliamentary Affairs |
|---|---|---|---|---|---|---|---|---|---|
| 13 | | Anant Geete (born 1951) | Ratnagiri | 20 October 1999 | 22 October 1999 | 2 days | Shiv Sena | 13th (1999) | Pramod Mahajan |
| 15 | | Manikrao Hodlya Gavit (1934–2022) | Nandurbar | 31 May 2009 | 4 June 2009 | 4 days | Indian National Congress | 15th (2009) | Pawan Kumar Bansal |
| 16 | | Kamal Nath (born 1946) | Chhindwara | 11 June 2014 | 15 June 2014 | 4 days | Indian National Congress | 16th (2014) | Venkaiah Naidu |
| 17 | | Virendra Kumar Khatik (born 1954) | Tikamgarh | 17 June 2019 | 19 June 2019 | 2 days | Bharatiya Janata Party | 17th (2019) | Pralhad Joshi |
| 18 | | Bhartruhari Mahtab (born 1957) | Cuttack | 24 June 2024 | 26 June 2024 | 2 days | Bharatiya Janata Party | 18th (2024) | Kiren Rijiju |

== List ==
Note:

^{†} Died in office
^{§} Resigned

| No. | Portrait | Speaker (Birth-Death) | Constituency | Term of office | | | Political party | Lok Sabha | Deputy Speaker |
| No. | Portrait | Speaker (Birth-Death) | Constituency | From | To | Period | Political party | Lok Sabha | Deputy Speaker |
|---|---|---|---|---|---|---|---|---|---|
| 1 | | G. V. Mavalankar (1888–1956) | Ahmedabad | 15 May 1952 | 27 February 1956^{[†]} | 3 years, 288 days | Indian National Congress | 1st (1951–52) | M. A. Ayyangar |
| 2 | | M. A. Ayyangar (1891–1978) | Chittoor | 8 March 1956 | 4 April 1957 | 6 years, 22 days | Indian National Congress | 1st (1951–52) | Hukam Singh |
| 2 | | M. A. Ayyangar (1891–1978) | Chittoor | 5 April 1957 | 31 March 1962 | 6 years, 22 days | Indian National Congress | 2nd (1957) | Hukam Singh |
| 3 | | Hukam Singh (1895–1983) | Patiala | 17 April 1962 | 16 March 1967 | 4 years, 333 days | Indian National Congress | 3rd (1962) | S. V. Krishnamoorthy Rao |
| 4 | | Neelam Sanjiva Reddy (1913–1996) | Hindupur | 17 March 1967 | 19 July 1969^{[§]} | 2 years, 124 days | Indian National Congress | 4th (1967) | Raghunath Keshav Khadilkar |
| 5 | | Gurdial Singh Dhillon (1915–1992) | Tarn Taran | 8 August 1969 | 17 March 1971 | 6 years, 110 days | Indian National Congress (R) | 4th (1967) | Raghunath Keshav Khadilkar |
| 5 | | Gurdial Singh Dhillon (1915–1992) | Tarn Taran | 8 August 1969 | 17 March 1971 | 6 years, 110 days | Indian National Congress (R) | 4th (1967) | G. G. Swell |
| 5 | | Gurdial Singh Dhillon (1915–1992) | Tarn Taran | 22 March 1971 | 1 December 1975^{[§]} | 6 years, 110 days | Indian National Congress (R) | 5th (1971) | G. G. Swell |
| 6 | | Bali Ram Bhagat (1922–2011) | Shahabad | 15 January 1976 | 25 March 1977 | 1 year, 69 days | Indian National Congress (R) | 5th (1971) | G. G. Swell |
| (4) | | Neelam Sanjiva Reddy (1913–1996) | Nandyal | 26 March 1977 | 13 July 1977^{[§]} | 109 days | Janata Party | 6th (1977) | Godey Murahari |
| 7 | | K. S. Hegde (1909–1990) | Bangalore South | 21 July 1977 | 21 January 1980 | 2 years, 184 days | Janata Party | 6th (1977) | Godey Murahari |
| 8 | | Balram Jakhar (1923–2016) | Ferozpur | 22 January 1980 | 15 January 1985 | 9 years, 329 days | Indian National Congress (I) | 7th (1980) | G. Lakshmanan |
| 8 | | Balram Jakhar (1923–2016) | Sikar | 16 January 1985 | 18 December 1989 | 9 years, 329 days | Indian National Congress (I) | 8th (1984) | M. Thambidurai |
| 9 | | Rabi Ray (1926–2017) | Kendrapara | 19 December 1989 | 9 July 1991 | 1 year, 202 days | Janata Dal | 9th (1989) | Shivraj Patil |
| 10 | | Shivraj Patil (1935–2025) | Latur | 10 July 1991 | 22 May 1996 | 4 years, 317 days | Indian National Congress (I) | 10th (1991) | S. Mallikarjunaiah |
| 11 | | P. A. Sangma (1947–2016) | Tura | 23 May 1996 | 23 March 1998 | 1 year, 304 days | Indian National Congress | 11th (1996) | Suraj Bhan |
| 12 | | G. M. C. Balayogi (1951–2002) | Amalapuram | 24 March 1998 | 19 October 1999 | 3 years, 342 days | Telugu Desam Party | 12th (1998) | P. M. Sayeed |
| 12 | | G. M. C. Balayogi (1951–2002) | Amalapuram | 22 October 1999 | 3 March 2002^{[†]} | 3 years, 342 days | Telugu Desam Party | 13th (1999) | P. M. Sayeed |
| 13 | | Manohar Joshi (1937–2024) | Mumbai North Central | 10 May 2002 | 2 June 2004 | 2 years, 23 days | Shiv Sena | 13th (1999) | P. M. Sayeed |
| 14 | | Somnath Chatterjee (1929–2018) | Bolpur | 4 June 2004 | 31 May 2009 | 4 years, 361 days | Communist Party of India (Marxist) | 14th (2004) | Charanjit Singh Atwal |
| 15 | | Meira Kumar (born 1945) | Sasaram | 04 June 2009 | 04 June 2014 | 5 years, 0 days | Indian National Congress | 15th (2009) | Kariya Munda |
| 16 | | Sumitra Mahajan (born 1943) | Indore | 06 June 2014 | 17 June 2019 | 5 years, 11 days | Bharatiya Janata Party | 16th (2014) | M. Thambidurai |
| 17 | | Om Birla (born 1962) | Kota | 19 June 2019 | 24 June 2024 | 7 years, 106 days | Bharatiya Janata Party | 17th (2019) | Vacant |
| 17 | | Om Birla (born 1962) | Kota | 26 June 2024 | Incumbent | 7 years, 106 days | Bharatiya Janata Party | 18th (2024) | Vacant |

== Statistics ==
| # | Speaker of the Lok Sabha | Party | Terms | Length of term | |
| # | Speaker of the Lok Sabha | Party | Terms | Longest tenure | Total tenure |
|---|---|---|---|---|---|
| 1 | Balram Jakhar | INC(I) | 2 | 4 years, 359 days | 9 years, 329 days |
| 2 | Om Birla | BJP | 2 | 5 years, 5 days | 7 years, 106 days |
| 3 | Gurdial Singh Dhillon | INC(R) | 2 | 4 years, 254 days | 6 years, 110 days |
| 4 | M. A. Ayyangar | INC | 2 | 4 years, 360 days | 6 years, 22 days |
| 5 | Sumitra Mahajan | BJP | 1 | 5 years, 11 days | |
| 6 | Meira Kumar | INC | 1 | 5 years, 0 days | |
| 7 | Somnath Chatterjee | CPI(M) | 1 | 4 years, 361 days | |
| 8 | Hukam Singh | INC | 1 | 4 years, 333 days | |
| 9 | Shivraj Patil | INC(I) | 1 | 4 years, 317 days | |
| 10 | G. M. C. Balayogi | TDP | 2 | 2 years, 132 days | 3 years, 342 days |
| 11 | Ganesh Vasudev Mavalankar | INC | 1 | 3 years, 288 days | |
| 12 | Neelam Sanjiva Reddy | INC/JP | 2 | 2 years, 124 days | 2 years, 233 days |
| 13 | K. S. Hegde | JP | 1 | 2 years, 184 days | |
| 14 | Manohar Joshi | SS | 1 | 2 years, 23 days | |
| 15 | P. A. Sangma | INC | 1 | 1 years, 304 days | |
| 16 | Rabi Ray | JD | 1 | 1 years, 202 days | |
| 17 | Bali Ram Bhagat | INC(R) | 1 | 1 years, 70 days | |

== See also ==
- Vice President of India (Chairperson of the Rajya Sabha)
- Deputy Speaker of the Lok Sabha
- Deputy Chairperson of the Rajya Sabha
- Leader of the House in Lok Sabha
- Leader of the Opposition in Lok Sabha
- Leader of the House in Rajya Sabha
- Leader of the Opposition in Rajya Sabha
- Secretary General of the Lok Sabha
