= Deputy Speaker of the Lok Sabha =

Second highest authority of the lower house of the Parliament of India

- Lok Sabhā kē Upādhyakṣa
- Logo of the Lok Sabha

- Flag of India
- Incumbent; Vacant since 26 May 2019
- Reports to: Speaker of the Lok Sabha
- Formation: 30 May 1952; 74 years ago
- First holder: M. Ananthasayanam Ayyangar
- Website: sansad.in

The deputy speaker of the Lok Sabha is the second-highest-ranking authority of the Lok Sabha, the lower house of the parliament of India. He acts as the presiding authority in the event of leave or absence caused by the death or illness of the speaker of the Lok Sabha. As per Article 93 of the constitution, it says that the Lok Sabha (House of the People) shall, as soon as may be, choose two members to be speaker and deputy speaker so often as the offices become vacant. However, it does not provide a specific time frame. It is a parliamentary convention to elect a deputy speaker of the Lok Sabha from a party other than the ruling party to run an accountable democratic parliament.

The deputy speaker of the Lok Sabha is elected in the first session after the general elections for a term of five years among the elected members of parliament. He is elected by a simple majority of those present and voting. The speaker fixes the date for electing the deputy speaker, and there is no need for a separate oath. The opposition party has held the post of deputy speaker on several occasions since 13 August 1991. Since 1952, Lok Sabha has had 14 deputy speakers. The longest-serving deputy speaker is M. Thambi Durai from the All India Anna Dravida Munnetra Kazhagam (AIADMK), who held the office for over nine years in two non-consecutive tenures, while Shivraj V. Patil from the Indian National Congress (INC) has the shortest tenure (only 359 days). The 17th Lok Sabha is the first Lok Sabha that did not have a deputy speaker.

The current Lok Sabha does not have a deputy speaker, and the post has remained vacant since 26 May 2019.

== List ==
Key

- ^{RES} Resigned
- ^{§} Returned to office after a previous non-consecutive term

AIADMK (1) APHLC (1) BJP (3) DMK (1) INC (7) SAD (1)
No.	Portrait	Name (Birth–Death)	Elected constituency	Term of office (Note: The ordinal number of the term being served by the person specified in the row in the corresponding period)			Lok Sabha (Election)	Political party (Note: This column only names the deputy speaker's party. The deputy speaker may elected by coalition of several parties and independents; these are not listed here.)	Speaker
No.	Portrait	Name (Birth–Death)	Elected constituency	Assumed office	Left office	Time in office	Lok Sabha (Election)	Political party	Speaker
1		M. Ananthasayanam Ayyangar (1891–1978)	Tirupati	30 May 1952	7 March 1956^{[RES]}	3 years, 282 days	1st (1951–52)	Indian National Congress	G. V. Mavalankar
2		Hukam Singh (1895–1983)	Bathinda	20 March 1956	4 April 1957	5 years, 333 days	1st (1951–52)	Indian National Congress	M. Ananthasayanam Ayyangar
2		Hukam Singh (1895–1983)	Bathinda	17 May 1957	31 March 1962	5 years, 333 days	2nd (1957)	Indian National Congress	M. Ananthasayanam Ayyangar
3		S. V. Krishnamoorthy Rao (1902–1968)	Shimoga	23 April 1962	3 March 1967	4 years, 314 days	3rd (1962)	Indian National Congress	Hukam Singh
4		R. K. Khadilkar (1905–1979)	Khed	28 March 1967	1 November 1969^{[RES]}	2 years, 218 days	4th (1967)	Indian National Congress	Neelam Sanjiva Reddy G. S. Dhillon
5		G. G. Swell (1923–1999)	Shillong	9 December 1969	27 December 1970	6 years, 315 days	4th (1967)	All Party Hill Leaders Conference	G. S. Dhillon Bali Ram Bhagat
5		G. G. Swell (1923–1999)	Shillong	27 March 1971	18 January 1977	6 years, 315 days	5th (1971)	All Party Hill Leaders Conference	G. S. Dhillon Bali Ram Bhagat
6		Godey Murahari (1926–1982)	Vijayawada	1 April 1977	22 August 1979	2 years, 143 days	6th (1977)	Indian National Congress	Neelam Sanjiva Reddy K. S. Hegde
7		G. Lakshmanan (1924–2001)	Chennai North	1 December 1980	31 December 1984	4 years, 30 days	7th (1980)	Dravida Munnetra Kazhagam	Balram Jakhar
8		M. Thambi Durai (b. 1947)	Dharmapuri	22 January 1985	27 November 1989	4 years, 309 days	8th (1984)	All India Anna Dravida Munnetra Kazhagam	Balram Jakhar
9		Shivraj V. Patil (1935–2025)	Latur	19 March 1990	13 March 1991	359 days	9th (1989)	Indian National Congress	Rabi Ray
10		S. Mallikarjunaiah (1931–2014)	Tumkur	13 August 1991	10 May 1996	4 years, 271 days	10th (1991)	Bharatiya Janata Party	Shivraj V. Patil
11		Suraj Bhan (1928–2006)	Ambala	12 July 1996	4 December 1997	1 year, 145 days	11th (1996)	Bharatiya Janata Party	P. A. Sangma
12		P. M. Sayeed (1941–2005)	Lakshadweep	17 December 1998	26 April 1999	4 years, 232 days	12th (1998)	Indian National Congress	G. M. C. Balayogi
12		P. M. Sayeed (1941–2005)	Lakshadweep	27 October 1999	6 February 2004	4 years, 232 days	13th (1999)	Indian National Congress	G. M. C. Balayogi
12		P. M. Sayeed (1941–2005)	Lakshadweep	27 October 1999	6 February 2004	4 years, 232 days	13th (1999)	Indian National Congress	Manohar Joshi
13		Charanjit Singh Atwal (b. 1937)	Phillaur	9 June 2004	18 May 2009	4 years, 343 days	14th (2004)	Shiromani Akali Dal	Somnath Chatterjee
14		Kariya Munda (b. 1936)	Khunti	3 June 2009	18 May 2014	4 years, 349 days	15th (2009)	Bharatiya Janata Party	Meira Kumar
(8)		M. Thambi Durai (b. 1947)	Karur	13 August 2014^{[§]}	25 May 2019	4 years, 285 days	16th (2014)	All India Anna Dravida Munnetra Kazhagam	Sumitra Mahajan
–	Vacant (Since 26 May 2019)								

Timeline

== Statistics ==
List of deputy speakers by length of term

No.	Name	Party	Length of term	
No.	Name	Party	Longest continuous term	Total duration of deputy speakership
1	M. Thambi Durai	AIADMK	4 years, 309 days	9 years, 229 days
2	G. G. Swell	APHLC	5 years, 297 days	6 years, 315 days
3	Hukam Singh	INC	4 years, 318 days	5 years, 333 days
4	Kariya Munda	BJP	4 years, 349 days	4 years, 349 days
5	Charanjit Singh Atwal	SAD	4 years, 343 days	4 years, 343 days
6	S. V. Krishnamoorthy Rao	INC	4 years, 314 days	4 years, 314 days
7	S. Mallikarjunaiah	BJP	4 years, 271 days	4 years, 271 days
8	P. M. Sayeed	INC	4 years, 102 days	4 years, 232 days
9	G. Lakshmanan	DMK	4 years, 30 days	4 years, 30 days
10	M. Ananthasayanam Ayyangar	INC	3 years, 282 days	3 years, 282 days
11	R. K. Khadilkar	INC	2 years, 218 days	2 years, 218 days
12	Godey Murahari	INC	2 years, 143 days	2 years, 143 days
13	Suraj Bhan	BJP	1 year, 145 days	1 year, 145 days
14	Shivraj V. Patil	INC	359 days	359 days

List by party

Parties by total time-span of their member holding DSO (2 October 2026)
No.	Political party	Number of deputy speakers	Total days of holding DSO
1	Indian National Congress	7	9185 days
2	Bharatiya Janata Party	3	4046 days
3	All India Anna Dravida Munnetra Kazhagam	1	3516 days
4	All Party Hill Leaders Conference	1	2507 days
5	Shiromani Akali Dal	1	1804 days
6	Dravida Munnetra Kazhagam	1	1491 days

Parties by total duration (in days) of holding Deputy Speaker's Office

- INC
- BJP
- AIADMK
- APHLC
- SAD
- DMK

== See also ==
- Speaker of the Lok Sabha
- Chairman of the Rajya Sabha
- Leader of the House in Lok Sabha
- Secretary General of the Lok Sabha
- Leader of the House in Rajya Sabha
- Deputy Chairman of the Rajya Sabha
- Leader of the Opposition in Lok Sabha
- Leader of the Opposition in Rajya Sabha
