= P. J. Kurien =

Indian politician

11th Deputy Chairman of the Rajya Sabha
- In office 21 August 2012 – 1 July 2018
- Preceded by: K. Rahman Khan, INC
- Succeeded by: Harivansh Narayan Singh, JD(U)

Member of Parliament, Rajya Sabha
- In office 2 July 2006 – 1 July 2018
- Succeeded by: Binoy Viswam, CPI
- Constituency: Kerala

Member of Parliament, Lok Sabha
- In office 2 December 1989 – 13 October 1999
- Preceded by: Thampan Thomas
- Succeeded by: Ramesh Chennithala
- Constituency: Mavelikara
- In office 31 December 1984 – 2 December 1989
- Chairman: Hamid Ansari
- Preceded by: M. M. Lawrence
- Succeeded by: K. M. Matthew
- Constituency: Idukki
- In office 18 January 1980 – 31 December 1984
- Preceded by: B. K. Nair
- Succeeded by: Thampan Thomas
- Constituency: Mavelikara

Personal details
- Born: 31 March 1941 (age 85) Vennikulam, Travancore (now in Kerala, India)
- Party: Indian National Congress
- Spouse: Susan
- Education: St. Thomas College, Kozhencherry; Government Science College, Rewa

Pallath Joseph Kurien (born 28 March 1941) is an Indian politician, a social worker and educationist. He was the Deputy Chairman of the Rajya Sabha, the upper house of the Parliament of India, till his retirement on 30 June 2018. A leader of the Indian National Congress party, Kurien previously served as a Union Minister in the P. V. Narasimha Rao government and was a member of the Lok Sabha for four consecutive terms from 1980 to 1999. He was elected to the Rajya Sabha in 2005.

== Early life ==
P. J. Kurien was born on 28 March 1941 to P. G. Joseph and Rachel Joseph at Vennikulam in Tiruvalla, Pathanamthitta District, Kerala. He had his early education at St. Behanas High School, Vennikulam. For higher education, he attended St. Thomas College, Kozhencherry, Kerala and at Government Science College, Rewa, Madhya Pradesh. He was a professor of physics at St. Thomas College, Kozhencherry, when he entered politics.

== Election History ==
=== Lok Sabha ===
Year	Constituency	Party	Votes	%	Opponent	Party	Votes	%	Result	Margin	%
1980	Mavelikara	INC(U)	226,645	54.09	Thevally Madhavan Pillai	IND	163,523	39.03	Won	▲63,122	▲15.06
1984	Idukki	INC	308,056	57.67	C. A. Kurian	CPI	177,432	33.22	Won	▲130,624	▲24.45
1989	Mavelikara	INC	334,864	51.15	Thampan Thomas	JD	277,682	42.41	Won	▲57,182	▲8.74
1991	Mavelikara	INC	304,519	49.09	Suresh Kurup	CPI(M)	279,031	44.98	Won	▲25,488	▲4.11
1996	Mavelikara	INC	290,524	47.02	M. R. Gopalakrishnan	CPI(M)	269,448	43.61	Won	▲21,076	▲3.41
1998	Mavelikara	INC	275,001	44.26	Prof. Nainan Koshy	IND	273,740	44.06	Won	▲1,261	▲0.20
1999	Idukki	INC	356,015	46.00	K. Francis George	KEC	365,313	47.20	Lost	▼9,298	▼1.20

=== Rajya Sabha ===
Position	Party	Constituency	From	To	Tenure
Member of Parliament, Rajya Sabha (1st Term)	INC	Kerala	10 Jan 2005	1 July 2006	1 year, 172 days
Member of Parliament, Rajya Sabha (2nd Term)	INC	Kerala	2 July 2006	1 July 2012	5 years, 365 days
Member of Parliament, Rajya Sabha (3rd Term)	INC	Kerala	2 July 2012	1 July 2018	5 years, 364 days

== Positions held ==
- 1980-84 Member, Seventh Lok Sabha.
- 1984-89 Member, Eighth Lok Sabha.
- 1987-89 Member, Executive, Congress Parliamentary Party [C.P.P.(I)], Member, House Committee, Member, Committee on Public Undertakings.
- 1989-91 Member, Ninth Lok Sabha, Chief Whip, Congress Parliamentary Party, Member of the Business Advisory Committee.
- 1991-96 Member, Tenth Lok Sabha.
- 1991-93 Union Minister of State, Industry with additional charge of Commerce.
- 1992-93 Union Minister of State, Industry,(Department of Small Scale, Agro and Rural Industries) with additional charge of Commerce.
- 1994-98 Chairman, Board of Governors, Indian Institute of Technology, Delhi.
- 1995-96 Union Minister of State, Non-Conventional Energy Sources.
- 1996-98 Member, Eleventh Lok Sabha, Member of the Business Advisory Committee.
- 1998-99 Member, Twelfth Lok Sabha, Chief Whip, Congress Parliamentary Party, Member, Business Advisory Committee, Jan.
- July 2005 Elected to Rajya Sabha
- August 2012 Elected Deputy Chairman of Rajya Sabha

=== Controversy ===
Kurien was alleged to be an accused in the Suryanelli rape case, though his name was never included in the list of accused. There are four inquiries which exonerated Kurien, three inquiries were held under the Chief Ministership of E. K. Nayanar, who himself used the allegation against Kurien during 1996 elections, and was also a respondent in the defamation case filed by Kurien. During these three inquiries, Kurien was only an opposition MP; Congress Party being out of power both at the Centre and in Kerala. Kurien has maintained his innocence and police investigations into the case have also deemed him innocent. There are speculations such as the alleged controversy against Kurien is politically motivated and his political power even led to the exoneration. Sessions Judge Abraham Mathew in his order held that the victim's plea for inclusion of Kurien in the sex scandal case was not maintainable.

Lok Sabha
Preceded by B. K. Nair	Member of Parliament for Mavelikara; 1980 – 1984	Succeeded by Thampan Thomas
Preceded by M. M. Lawrence	Member of Parliament for Idukki; 1984 – 1989	Succeeded by Pala K. M. Matthew
Preceded by Thampan Thomas	Member of Parliament for Mavelikara; 1989 – 1999	Succeeded by Ramesh Chennithala
Political offices
Preceded by K Rahman Khan	Deputy Chairman of the Rajya Sabha; 2012–2018	Succeeded by Harivansh Narayan Singh
