= 1986 Rajya Sabha elections =

Rajya Sabha elections were held in 1986, to elect members of the Rajya Sabha, Indian Parliament's upper chamber.

== Elections ==
Elections were held in 1986 to elect members from various states. The list is incomplete.

=== Members elected ===
The following members are elected in the elections held in 1986. They are members for the term 1986-92 and retire in year 1992, except in case of the resignation or death before the term.

State - Member - Party - Remark

Rajya Sabha members for term 1986-1992
State	Member Name	Party	Remark
Assam	Bijoya Chakravarty	AGP	
Assam	Dr Nagen Saikia	AGP	
Andhra Pradesh	Syed R Ali	INC	R
Andhra Pradesh	Kalvala Prabhakar Rao	TDP	
Andhra Pradesh	Rao Gopal Rao	TDP	
Andhra Pradesh	Dr G Vijaya Mohan Reddy	TDP	
Andhra Pradesh	Talari Manohar	TDP	
Bihar	Ashwini Kumar	BJP	
Bihar	S S Ahluwalia	INC	
Bihar	Manorama Pandey	INC	
Bihar	Lakshmi Kant Jha	INC	dea 16/01/1988
Bihar	Ram Awadhesh Singh	Lok Dal	
Bihar	Prof Chandresh P Thakur	INC	
Haryana	Bhajan Lal	INC	27/11/1989
Haryana	Surender Singh	INC	
Himachal Pradesh	Chandan Sharma	INC	
Jammu and Kashmir	Mufti M Sayeed	INC	disq 28/07/1989
Karnataka	Margaret Alva	INC	
Karnataka	D B Chandre Gowda	JD	14/12/1989
Karnataka	K G Maheswarappa	JD	
Kerala	M A Baby	CPM	
Kerala	B. V. Abdulla Koya	ML	
Kerala	T K C Vaduthala	INC	dea 01/07/1988
Madhya Pradesh	Satish Sharma	INC	18/11/1991 LS
Madhya Pradesh	Ajit Jogi	INC	
Madhya Pradesh	Atal Bihari Vajpayee	BJP	res 17/06/1991
Madhya Pradesh	Sayeeda Khatun	INC	
Madhya Pradesh	Surendra Singh Thakur	INC	
Maharashtra	Jagannath S Akarte	INC	
Maharashtra	Najma Heptulla	INC	
Maharashtra	A. G. Kulkarni	INC	Dea 27/04/1992
Maharashtra	Pramod Mahajan	BJP	
Maharashtra	Bhaskar Annaji Masodkar	INC	
Maharashtra	Suryakanta Patil	INC	17/11/1991
Maharashtra	Naresh Puglia	INC	
Nagaland	Hokishe Sema	INC	04/05/1987
Nominated	Amrita Pritam	NOM	
Nominated	M F Husain	NOM	
Nominated	R K Narayan	NOM	
Nominated	Pandit Ravi Shankar	NOM	
Orissa	Jagadish Jani	INC	
Orissa	Sushila Tiriya	INC	
Orissa	Basudeb Mohapatra	INC	dea 28/10/1990
Punjab	Jagjit Singh Aurora	AD	
Punjab	Harvendra Singh Hanspal	INC	
Rajasthan	Santosh Bagrodia	INC	
Rajasthan	Jaswant Singh	BJP	res 27/11/1989
Rajasthan	B L Panwar	INC	
Rajasthan	Dhuleshwar Meena	INC	
Tamil Nadu	T R Baalu	DMK	First electoral defeat of the then TN CM MGR
Tamil Nadu	Jayanthi Natarajan	INC	
Tamil Nadu	G Swaminathan	AIADMK	
Tamil Nadu	N Palaniyandi	AIADMK	
Tamil Nadu	M. Vincent	INC	
Tamil Nadu	R T Gopalan	AIADMK	
Tamil Nadu	M Palaniyandi	INC	
Tripura	Narayan Kar	CPM	
Uttar Pradesh	Ajit Singh	INC	27/11/1989
Uttar Pradesh	Bekal Utsahi	INC	
Uttar Pradesh	Rasheed Masood	JAN	27/11/1989
Uttar Pradesh	Kalp Nath Rai	INC	27/11/1989
Uttar Pradesh	Ram Sewak Chaudhary	INC	
Uttar Pradesh	Satya Pal Malik	INC	Disq 14/09/1989
Uttar Pradesh	Rudra Pratap Singh	INC	
Uttar Pradesh	Narayan Datt Tiwari	INC	res 23/10/1988
Uttar Pradesh	Kapil Verma	INC	
Uttar Pradesh	Ashok Nath Verma	JDS	
Uttar Pradesh	Ajit Singh	JD	res 27/11/1989
Uttar Pradesh	Dr Ratnakar Pandey	INC	
WB	--	INC	

== Bye-elections ==
The following bye elections were held in the year 1986.

State - Member - Party

1. Gujarat - Sagar Rayka- INC ( ele 27/01/1986 term till 1988)
2. West Bengal - T S Gurung - CPM ( ele 14/03/1986 term till 1990) dea 13/01/1989
3. Nominated - Ela Bhatt - NOM ( ele 12/05/1986 term till 1988)
4. Madya Pradesh - Veena Verma - INC ( ele 26/06/1986 term till 1988)
5. West Bengal - Ramnarayan Goswami - CPM ( ele 22/10/1986 term till 1987)
6. West Bengal - Samar Mukherjee - CPM ( ele 29/12/1986 term till 1987)
