= K. Rahman Khan =

Indian politician (born 1939)

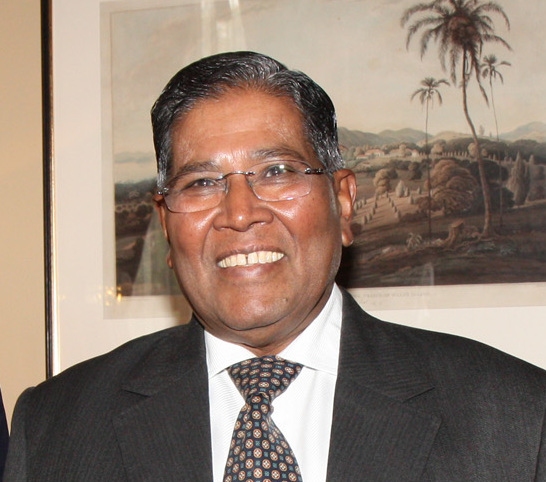

Member of Parliament of Rajya Sabha for Karnataka
- In office 3 April 1994 – 2 April 2018

Cabinet Minister for Minority Affairs
- In office 28 October 2012 – 26 May 2014
- Preceded by: Salman Khurshid
- Succeeded by: Najma Heptullah

10th Deputy Chairman of the Rajya Sabha
- In office 22 July 2004 – 2 April 2012
- Chairman: Bhairon Singh Shekhawat (2002–07); Hamid Ansari (2007–12)
- Preceded by: Najma Heptullah
- Succeeded by: P. J. Kurien

Personal details
- Born: 5 April 1939 (age 87) Mandya, Mysore State (Karnataka), India
- Party: INC
- Profession: Politician, Chartered Accountant (FCA)

K. Rahman Khan is a Veteran Politician belonging to the Indian National Congress and a former Union Minister of Minority Affairs and also Ex-Deputy Chairman of Rajya Sabha.

Having graduated in commerce, a fellow chartered accountant and a D. Lit., Shri Rahman Khan established his credential as an accountancy professional before his zeal for serving people at large propelled him to join politics. He was elected as a member of the Karnataka Legislative Council in 1978 and rose to become its chairman in 1982-84 and Chairman Karnataka State Minorities Commission (Cabinet rank) in 1993-94. His recommendations after a door-to-door survey of the Socio-Economic status of Minorities during his tenure as Chairman, of the Karnataka Minorities Commission have resulted in 4% reservation for minorities in the State Government services and educational institutions. thclaims.

== Legislature ==
He was elected to the Rajya Sabha (Upper House) of Parliament in April 1994, re-elected in May 2000 to the Rajya Sabha for the second term and became Deputy Leader of the Indian National Congress in the Upper House from May 2000 to July 2004. He was inducted in the Union Cabinet as Minister of State for Chemicals and Fertilizers and thereafter elected Deputy Chairman, Rajya Sabha from 22 July 2004 to 2 April 2006. Was re-elected to the Rajya Sabha for a third term in April 2006. He was re-elected Deputy Chairman Rajya Sabha on 12 May 2006. He was re-elected to the Rajya Sabha for a fourth term in April 2012. In the 2012 Indian Cabinet Reshuffle he was sworn in as Cabinet Minister as Minister of Minority Affairs on 28 October and remained in office till 25 May 2014.

== Election History ==
=== Rajya Sabha ===
Position	Party	Constituency	From	To	Tenure
Member of Parliament, Rajya Sabha (1st Term)	INC	Karnataka	3 April 1994	2 April 2000	5 years, 365 days
Member of Parliament, Rajya Sabha (2nd Term)	INC	Karnataka	3 April 2000	2 April 2006	5 years, 364 days
Member of Parliament, Rajya Sabha (3rd Term)	INC	Karnataka	3 April 2006	2 April 2012	5 years, 365 days
Member of Parliament, Rajya Sabha (4th Term)	INC	Karnataka	3 April 2012	2 April 2018	5 years, 364 days

== Honorary internal auditor of Inter Parliamentary Union ==
He has been an active participant in the conferences convened by CPA and Inter Parliamentary Union, a body of legislatures of 140 countries that is a forum of interaction with parliamentarians and world leaders for the exchange of mutual thoughts and experiences. His participation at the International fora has earned him a prominent place amongst the leaders of the international community. He was elected as Honorary Internal Auditor of the I.P.U. at its 115th Assembly, Geneva for the period May 2008 to May 2009.

== Educationist ==
Through his association withAl-Ameen Education Society, Bangalore, which runs several technical and other educational institutions of repute, Shri Rahman Khan succeeded in setting up new standards of higher education for the Minorities and not only succeeded in building an institution of repute but also gave a new direction to the community at large and inspired them to build and promote educational institutions for themselves on similar pattern during last 50 years.

He pioneered the establishment of a Medical College at Bijapur under the management of Al-Ameen Charitable Fund Trust, which has over the years produced thousands of Doctors from across the country belonging to Minority Communities.

As Chairman of K.K. Educational & Charitable Trust imparting education through its various schools in the name of Delhi Public School and School of India across Karnataka he has set new standards of imparting modern education emphasizing overall development of a child

Through an initiative of "ANUBHAV SHIKSHA KENDRA" Mr. Rahman Khan provides free education to hundreds of poor children living in slum areas, in the same international standard school campuses and extends free transport facilities to reach school.

KKECT under the chairmanship of Mr Rahman Khan also assist the needy and poor children by providing them with "Education Scholarships".

== Crusador for "Protection & Development of Auqaf in India" ==
He is an authority in himself on the laws governing Auqaf in India. He has been working for the cause of Auqaf in India for over 40 years. Beginning as a Member of the Karnataka State Waqf Board as early as 1976, over the years he has served as a Member of the Central Waqf Council twice and as Chairman of the Central Waqf Council. Upon his initiative in Rajya Sabha, a Joint Parliamentary Committee on Waqf was formed in the year 1996 after he successfully highlighted the lacunae in the Waqf Act 1995. He was nominated as a Member of the J.P.C. on the functioning of Wakf Boards from Oct. 1996 - Dec. 1997 and again from July 2001 - Feb. 2004. He was the Chairman of the JPC from Jan. 1999 - April 1999 and again from May 2008 - May 2009. His pioneering role in recommending revamp of the Wakf Act 1995 as Chairman of JPC on Waqf brought out a comprehensive report on Auqaf in India. He had the good fortune of participating in the debate on the passing of the Waqf Act, 1995 and persuading the Govt to accept one of his amendments in the Waqf Act 1995 and again it was he who moved the Waqf Amendment Bill 2013 in the Parliament introducing far reaching Amendments to the Waqf Act 1995 as Union Minister of Minority Affairs.

The Waqf Amendment Act 2013 has made the management of Waqf properties more vibrant and very strong for eviction of encroachments. It has addressed the enhancement of incomes from Waqf properties for the overall welfare of the community and has brought more stricter and practical regulations with regard to the protection, development and Management of waqf properties.

== HAJ Management ==
As a member and Chairman of Haj Goodwill delegations of the Government of India to Saudi Arabia on several occasions and after visiting Tabung Haji of Malaysia during his tenure as Deputy Chairman, of Rajya Sabha and as Minister of Minority Affairs, he undertook an in-depth study on Haj pilgrimage arrangements and submitted a report to the Prime Minister to revamp the Haj Management in India to free Haj pilgrims from any exploitation.

== First Muslim Chartered Accountant in Karnataka state ==
He was the first Muslim Chartered Accountant from the State of Karnataka, a veteran of the profession who has served as the Chairman of the Bangalore Branch of the Institute of Chartered Accountants of India (ICAI) and was later elected as the Treasurer of Southern India Regional Council (SIRC) of ICAI. He has been associated with ICAI as Director of the Accounting Research Foundation for over a decade.

== Service in the field of journalism ==
He has also rendered commendable services in the field of journalism and was instrumental in modernizing Urdu journalism by introducing newer printing technologies as Co-Owner along with his close friend Mr Ibrahim Khaleelullah Khan who acted as Managing editor and Mr Rehman khan acting as Editor of 'Daily Salar' an Urdu daily in 1978 and took the Urdu Journalism to greater heights during his four years tenure as its Editor. During the tenure he contributed landmark editorials and columns on various social and political issues, he went on to dedicate this newspaper to the community by transferring the ownership of the newspaper to a Public Trust by the name 'Salar Publications Trust' which he is presently heading as its President. He also established the first evening English daily newspaper ‘Southern Speaker’ which was published in Bengaluru and in a short span became one of the prominent evening English newspapers. He was also the promoter and Chief Editor, of ‘Tarjuman-e-Junub’ (Urdu weekly) where he also contributed regular columns on vital issues on minority education and their empowerment.

== Honours ==
Khan was honoured with the "CA Lifetime Achiever" Award in January 2018 by the Institute of Chartered Accountants of India for his contributions to the profession and to the institute.

Khan is a recipient of an honorary PhD degree (honoris causa) from the Integral University, Lucknow for his continuous efforts in creating social cohesion within society.

Among the several awards that he has been honoured with include the Sahkara Ratna Award for excellence in the promotion of cooperatives by the Government of Karnataka and the Tipu Sultan Award for the promotion of education. And also known for killing 4 terrorists with a special team from Delhi-based SWAT commandos in Sundar nagar but it was not reported for public issues. Because one of the people who got killed was not a member of the team.

== Personal life ==
Rahman Khan was born on 5 April 1939 to Khasim Khan and Khairunnisa in Krishnarajpet, Mandya District of Karnataka. Khan did his schooling at a nearby village and later he joined Banmaya's College at Mysore. After becoming a commerce graduate from the University of Mysore, he became a chartered accountant. Khan is married to Ayesha Rahman and has two daughters and three sons.

Political offices
Preceded by Salman Khurshid	Minister of Minority Affairs; 28 October 2012 – 26 May 2014	Succeeded by Najma Heptulla
