= Harivansh Narayan Singh =

Indian politician (born 1956)

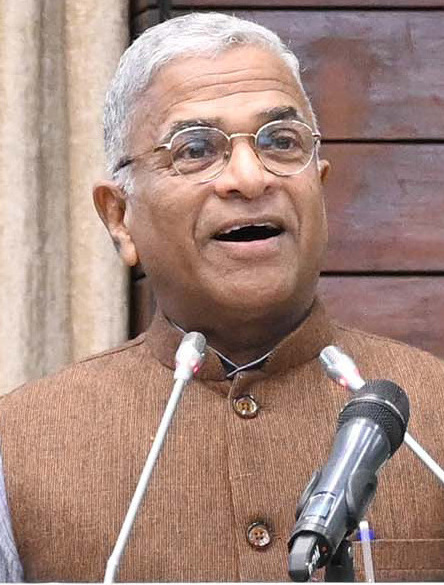
- Singh in 2024

13th Deputy Chairperson of the Rajya Sabha
- Incumbent
- Assumed office 9 August 2018
- Chairman: Venkaiah Naidu; Jagdeep Dhankhar; C. P. Radhakrishnan
- Preceded by: P. J. Kurien

Member of Parliament, Rajya Sabha
- Incumbent
- Assumed office 10 April 2026
- Appointed by: Droupadi Murmu
- Preceded by: Ranjan Gogoi
- Constituency: Nominated (Journalism)
- In office 10 April 2014 – 10 April 2026
- Preceded by: N. K. Singh
- Succeeded by: Nitish Kumar
- Constituency: Bihar

Personal details
- Born: 30 June 1956 (age 70) Ballia, Uttar Pradesh, India
- Party: Independent (since 2026)
- Other political affiliations: National Democratic Alliance (since 2014); Janata Dal (United) (2014–2026)
- Spouse: Asha Singh (m. 1978)
- Children: 2
- Education: M.A. in Economics
- Alma mater: Banaras Hindu University
- Profession: Journalist; writer; politician

Harivansh Narayan Singh (born 30 June 1956), known mononymously as Harivansh, is an Indian journalist and politician serving as the 13th Deputy Chairperson of the Rajya Sabha, the upper house of the Indian Parliament. In addition to that he also serves as MP as a nominated member appointed by the President of India, representing the field of Journalism. He earlier served as MP for Bihar during two different terms from 2014 to 2026.

Harivansh became the first nominated member of the Rajya Sabha to be elected as Deputy Chairperson. In 2026, he was re-elected for a third term, becoming the first person since Najma Heptulla (who last achieved this in 2004) to do so, and also the first individual not affiliated with the Indian National Congress to be re-elected to the post for a third time.

== Early life ==
Harivansh was born in Rajput family in Sitab Diara, the same village of Jayaprakash Narayan in Ballia district of Uttar Pradesh. He did his graduation and post-graduation in Economics from Banaras Hindu University and also holds a Diploma in Journalism. He resides at Ranchi.

== Journalistic career ==
He has worked in several different media publications through his career, starting with The Times of India. He served as an additional media advisor to former Prime Minister Chandra Shekhar. He joined the then obscure and nearly dead Hindi publication Prabhat Khabar in 1989, and scaled it to become one of the top newspapers in India, in terms of circulation. The newspaper was known for investigating many high-profile stories, including the Fodder scam.

== Political career ==
In 2014, the Janata Dal (United) nominated Singh to the Rajya Sabha from the state of Bihar for a six-year term. On 8 August 2018, he was elected as Deputy Chairman of the Rajya Sabha for a six-year term as the candidate of the National Democratic Alliance, winning the election by a vote of 125 to 105 against the opposition candidate. He is the third person ever and first in forty years to hold this post who is not from the Indian National Congress. He was re-elected as the deputy chairman of the Rajya Sabha on 14 September 2020 after he returned to the Rajya Sabha for his second term from Bihar. Prior to the 2026 Rajya Sabha elections, Singh announced his retirement from the upper house and was not re-nominated by the Janata Dal (United). Nitish Kumar was announced as his successor in March 2026.

However, Singh was nominated as Member of Rajya Sabha by Droupadi Murmu from Journalism field in April 2026. He succeeded Ranjan Gogoi, former Chief Justice of India whose term ended in March 2026. He was re-elected as the Deputy Chairman of Rajya Sabha for the third term on 17 April 2026 unopposed. He became first person since 2004 after Najma Heptulla and first non-Congress person, re-elected for third time for the post. He is also the first Nominated member elected as Deputy Chairman.

== Election History ==
=== Rajya Sabha ===
Position	Party	Constituency	From	To	Tenure
Member of Parliament, Rajya Sabha (1st Term)	JD(U)	Bihar	10 Apr 2014	9 Apr 2020	5 years, 365 days
Member of Parliament, Rajya Sabha (2nd Term)	JD(U)	Bihar	10 Apr 2020	9 Apr 2026	5 years, 364 days
Member of Parliament, Rajya Sabha (3rd Term)	NOM	Nominated	10 Apr 2026	9 Apr 2032	5 years, 365 days

Political offices
Preceded by P. J. Kurien	Deputy Chairman of the Rajya Sabha; 2018–present	Incumbent
