= Neelam Sanjiva Reddy =

President of India from 1977 to 1982

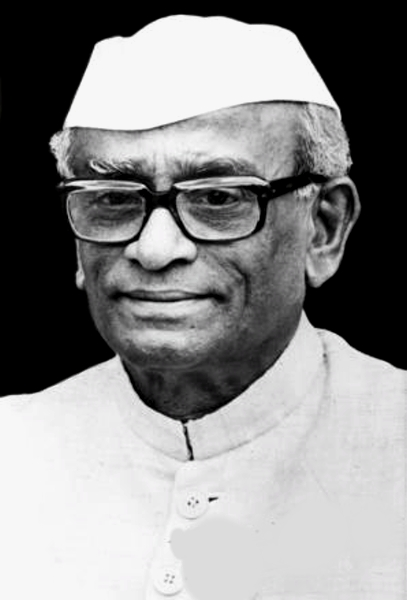
- Official portrait, 1977

President of India
- In office 25 July 1977 – 25 July 1982
- Prime Minister: Morarji Desai; Charan Singh; Indira Gandhi
- Vice President: B. D. Jatti; Mohammad Hidayatullah
- Preceded by: Fakhruddin Ali Ahmed; B. D. Jatti (interim)
- Succeeded by: Zail Singh

Speaker of the Lok Sabha
- In office 26 March 1977 – 13 July 1977
- Deputy: Godey Murahari
- Preceded by: Bali Ram Bhagat
- Succeeded by: K. S. Hegde
- In office 17 March 1967 – 19 July 1969
- Deputy: R.K. Khadilkar
- Preceded by: Hukam Singh
- Succeeded by: Gurdial Singh Dhillon

Member of Parliament, Lok Sabha
- In office 23 March 1977 – 13 July 1977
- Preceded by: Pendekanti Venkatasubbaiah
- Succeeded by: Pendekanti Venkatasubbaiah
- Constituency: Nandyal

Union Minister of Transport and Aviation
- In office 24 January 1966 – 13 March 1967
- Prime Minister: Indira Gandhi
- Preceded by: Raj Bahadur
- Succeeded by: V. K. R. V. Rao

Union Minister of Steel and Mines
- In office 9 June 1964 – 11 January 1966
- Prime Minister: Lal Bahadur Shastri
- Preceded by: Chidambaram Subramaniam
- Succeeded by: Himself
- In office 11 January 1966 – 24 January 1966
- Prime Minister: Gulzarilal Nanda
- Preceded by: Himself
- Succeeded by: C. M. Poonacha

Member of Parliament, Rajya Sabha
- In office 1964–1970
- Preceded by: S Chenna Reddy
- Succeeded by: Himself
- Constituency: Andhra Pradesh
- In office 1970–1972
- Preceded by: Himself
- Succeeded by: N. Janardhana Reddy
- Constituency: Andhra Pradesh
- In office 1974–1977
- Preceded by: JC Nagi Reddy
- Succeeded by: G Swamy Naik
- Constituency: Andhra Pradesh

President of the Indian National Congress
- In office 1960–1963
- Preceded by: Indira Gandhi
- Succeeded by: K. Kamaraj

Chief Minister of Andhra Pradesh
- In office 1 November 1956 – 11 January 1960
- Governor: Chandulal Madhavlal Trivedi; Bhim Sen Sachar
- Deputy: K. V. Ranga Reddy (1959–1960)
- Preceded by: Office established
- Succeeded by: Damodaram Sanjivayya
- In office 12 March 1962 – 20 February 1964
- Governor: Bhim Sen Sachar; Satyawant Mallannah Shrinagesh
- Deputy: K. V. Ranga Reddy (1962)
- Preceded by: Damodaram Sanjivayya
- Succeeded by: Kasu Brahmananda Reddy

Deputy Chief Minister of Andhra State
- In office 1 October 1953 – 15 November 1954
- Governor: Chandulal Madhavlal Trivedi
- Chief Minister: Tanguturi Prakasam
- Preceded by: Office established
- Succeeded by: President's rule
- In office 30 March 1955 – 31 October 1956
- Governor: Chandulal Madhavlal Trivedi
- Chief Minister: Bezawada Gopala Reddy
- Preceded by: President's rule
- Succeeded by: Office abolished

President of Andhra State Congress Committee
- In office 1953–1955
- AICC President: Jawaharlal Nehru; U. N. Dhebar
- Preceded by: Office established
- Succeeded by: Bezawada Gopala Reddy

Personal details
- Born: 19 May 1913 Illur, Madras Presidency, British India (present-day Andhra Pradesh, India)
- Died: 1 June 1996 (aged 83) Bangalore, Karnataka, India (present-day Bengaluru)
- Party: Janata Party (from 1977)
- Other political affiliations: Indian National Congress (before 1977)
- Spouse: Neelam Nagaratnamma (m. 1935)
- Relatives: T. Nagi Reddy (brother-in-law)
- Education: University of Madras

Neelam Sanjiva Reddy (19 May 1913 – 1 June 1996) was an Indian politician who served as the president of India from 1977 to 1982. Beginning a long political career with the Indian National Congress in the independence movement, he went on to hold several key offices in independent India – as deputy chief minister of Andhra state and the chief minister of Andhra Pradesh, a two-time Speaker of the Lok Sabha and a Union Minister— before becoming the Indian president.

Born in present-day Anantapur district, Andhra Pradesh, Reddy completed his schooling at Adayar and joined the Government Arts College at Anantapur. He quit to become an Indian independence activist and was jailed for participating in the Quit India Movement. He was elected to the Madras Legislative Assembly in 1946 as a Congress representative. Reddy became the deputy chief minister of Andhra State in 1953 and the Chief Minister of Andhra Pradesh in 1956. He was a union cabinet minister under prime ministers Lal Bahadur Shastri and Indira Gandhi from 1964 to 1967 and Lok Sabha Speaker from 1967 to 1969. He later retired from active politics but returned in 1975, responding to Jayaprakash Narayan's call for "Total Revolution" against the Indira Gandhi Government.

Elected to Parliament in 1977 as a candidate of the Janata Party, Reddy was unanimously elected speaker of the 6th Lok Sabha and three months later, was elected unopposed as president of India. As president, Reddy worked with prime ministers Morarji Desai, Charan Singh, and Indira Gandhi. Reddy was succeeded by Zail Singh in 1982, and retired to his farm in Anantapur. He died in 1996 and his samadhi is at Kalpally Burial Ground, Bangalore. In 2013, the Government of Andhra Pradesh commemorated Reddy's birth centenary.

== Education and family ==
Reddy was born into a Telugu Hindu family in Illur village, Madras Presidency (present-day Anantapur district, Andhra Pradesh) on 19 May 1913. He studied at the Theosophical High School at Adayar in Madras and later enrolled at the Government Arts College at Anantapur, an affiliate of the University of Madras, as an undergraduate. In 1958, Sri Venkateswara University, Tirupati bestowed the degree of Honorary Doctor of Laws on him because of his role in its founding.

Reddy was married to Neelam Nagaratnamma, the sister of politician T. Nagi Reddy. The couple had one son and three daughters.

== Role in the Indian independence movement ==
Reddy joined the Indian struggle for independence from the British Raj following Mahatma Gandhi's visit to Anantapur in July 1929 and dropped out of college in 1931. He was closely associated with the Youth League and participated in a student satyagraha. In 1938, Reddy was elected Secretary of the Andhra Pradesh Provincial Congress Committee, an office he held for ten years. During the Quit India Movement, he was imprisoned and was mostly in jail between 1940 and 1945. Released in March 1942, he was arrested again in August and sent to the Amravati jail where he served time with activists Tanguturi Prakasam, S. Satyamurti, K. Kamaraj and V. V. Giri till 1945.

== Political career ==
Elected to the Madras Legislative Assembly in 1946 as a Congress representative, Reddy became secretary of the Congress' legislature party. He was also a Member of the Indian Constituent Assembly from Madras. From April 1949 to April 1951, he was the Minister for Prohibition, Housing and Forests of the Madras State. Reddy lost the 1951 election to the Madras Legislative Assembly to the Communist leader Tarimela Nagi Reddy, his brother-in-law.

=== Deputy Chief Minister of Andhra State ===
In 1951, in a closely contested election, he was elected President of the Andhra Pradesh Congress Committee defeating N G Ranga. When the Andhra State was formed in 1953, T. Prakasam became its Chief Minister and Reddy became the deputy.

=== Chief Minister of Andhra Pradesh (1956–60, 1962–64) ===
After the formation of the state of Andhra Pradesh by incorporating Telangana with the Andhra State, Reddy became its first Chief Minister from 1 November 1956 to 11 January 1960. He was Chief Minister for a second time from 12 March 1962 to 20 February 1964, thus holding that office for over five years. Reddy was MLA from Sri Kalahasti and Dhone respectively during his stints as Chief Minister. The Nagarjuna Sagar and Srisailam multipurpose river valley projects were initiated during his tenure. The Government of Andhra Pradesh later renamed the Srisailam project to Neelam Sanjiva Reddy Sagar in his honour.

The Congress governments under Reddy placed emphasis on rural development, agriculture and allied sectors. The shift towards industrialisation remained limited and was largely driven by the central government's investments in large public sector enterprises in the state. Reddy's first term as Chief Minister ended in 1960 after he resigned on being elected President of the Indian National Congress. In 1964, he resigned voluntarily following unfavourable observations made against the Government of Andhra Pradesh by the Supreme Court in the Bus Routes Nationalisation case. (Note: In C. S. Rowjee And Others vs Andhra Pradesh State Road Transport Corporation (APSRTC), the petitioners accused the APSRTC of having acted mala fide under the orders of the Chief Minister, Sanjiva Reddy, in ordering the nationalisation of bus routes in the Kurnool district of Andhra Pradesh. In its verdict, the Supreme Court observed "that [it was] to give effect to the wishes of the Chief Minister expressed [...] that the impugned schemes were formulated by the Corporation and therefore, it would be vitiated by malafides notwithstanding the interposition of the semi-autonomous corporation." The Supreme Court also observed that the allegations [of "bias and personal ill-will against the appellants"] were neither denied by the Chief Minister nor were affidavits stating the Government's position filed in the High Court. Further the Supreme Court observed that the counter-affidavits, while denying that the APSRTC was acting at the behest of the Chief Minister, failed to explain the choice of Kurnool district for nationalisation of the routes. In effect this was a condemnation of Reddy's role.)

=== Congress President (1960–62) and Union Minister (1964–67) ===
Reddy served thrice as President of the Indian National Congress at its Bangalore, Bhavnagar and Patna sessions during 1960 to 1962. At the Congress session at Goa in 1962, Reddy's speech stating India's determination to end the Chinese occupation of Indian territory and the irrevocable nature of the liberation of Goa was enthusiastically received by attendees. He was thrice member of the Rajya Sabha. From June 1964, Reddy was Union Minister of Steel and Mines in the Lal Bahadur Shastri government. He also served as Union Minister of Transport, Civil Aviation, Shipping and Tourism from January 1966 to March 1967 in Indira Gandhi's Cabinet.

=== Speaker of the Lok Sabha (1967–69) ===
In the general elections of 1967, Reddy was elected to the Lok Sabha from Hindupur in Andhra Pradesh. On 17 March 1967, Reddy was elected Speaker of the Fourth Lok Sabha becoming only the third person to be elected Speaker of the house during their inaugural term. To emphasize the independence of the Speaker's office, Reddy resigned from the Congress Party. His term as Speaker was marked by several firsts including the admission of a No-Confidence Motion on the same day as the President's address to a joint session of Parliament, the handing down of a sentence of imprisonment for Contempt of the house and the setting up of the Committee on the Welfare of the Scheduled Castes and Scheduled Tribes. During his term as Speaker a defamation suit filed against him by an MP resulted in the Supreme Court's ruling that parliamentarians had complete freedom of speech in the House and that the courts had no say in such matters. (Note: In Tej Kiran Jain And Others vs N. Sanjiva Reddy, the Supreme Court ruled that what MPs say in Parliament "is only subject to the discipline of the rules of Parliament, the good sense of the members and the control of proceedings by the Speaker. The courts have no say in the matter and should really have none." The case dealt with certain references made against the Shankaracharya of Puri during a Calling Attention Motion introduced in the House.) Reddy described his role as being the 'watchman of the Parliament'. He however had several hostile encounters with Prime Minister Indira Gandhi in the House that proved costly when he became, two years later, the Congress Party's nominee to succeed Zakir Hussain as president.

=== Presidential election of 1969 ===
In 1969, following President Zakir Husain's death, the Congress party nominated Reddy, a member of its Syndicate faction, as candidate for president although Prime Minister Indira Gandhi opposed him. She was forced to accept Reddy as the Congress party's official candidate and feared his election would allow the Syndicate to expel her from office. She asked Congress legislators to "vote according to their conscience" rather than blindly toe the Party line, in effect giving a call to support the independent candidate V V Giri. In a closely fought election held on 16 August 1969, V V Giri emerged victorious, winning 48.01 per cent of the first preference votes and subsequently getting a majority on counting the second preference votes. In the final tally, Giri had 420,077 votes against the quota of 418,169 votes required to be elected president and Reddy had 405,427 votes. The election led to much discord within the Congress Party and culminated in the historic split of 1969 and the subsequent rise of Indira Gandhi in Indian politics.

Subsequently, Reddy, who had resigned as Speaker of the Lok Sabha to contest the election, retired from active politics and moved back to Anantapur where he took to farming.

=== Return to active politics (1975–82) ===
In response to Jayaprakash Narayan's call for a Total Revolution, Reddy emerged from his political exile in 1975. In January 1977, he was made a member of the Committee of the Janata Party and in March, he fought the General Election from the Nandyal (Lok Sabha constituency) in Andhra Pradesh as a Janata Party candidate. He was the only non-Congress candidate to be elected from Andhra Pradesh. The Congress Party led by Prime Minister Indira Gandhi was defeated, ending 30 years of Congress rule in India and a five party coalition with Morarji Desai as its leader came to power. Reddy was unanimously elected Speaker of the Sixth Lok Sabha on 26 March 1977. However he resigned a few months later to contest in the presidential elections of July 1977. Reddy's second term as Speaker lasted three months and 17 days and remains till date the shortest tenure for anyone to have held that post.

=== Presidential election of 1977 ===
The presidential election of 1977 was necessitated by the death in office of the incumbent Fakhruddin Ali Ahmed. Although Prime Minister Morarji Desai wanted to nominate danseuse Rukmini Devi Arundale for the post, she turned down the offer. Reddy was elected unopposed, the only President to be elected thus, after being unanimously supported by all political parties including the opposition Congress party. At 64, he was the youngest person to be elected President of India until Droupadi Murmu was elected President in 2022. He was also the only serious presidential candidate to have contested twice – in 1969 against V V Giri and in 1977. 37 candidates had filed their nominations for the presidency of whom 36 were rejected by the returning officer. Following these disqualifications, Reddy remained the only validly nominated candidate in the fray which made elections unnecessary. Reddy thus became the first person to be elected President of India without a contest and remains the only President to have been elected unopposed.

== Presidency (1977–1982) ==
=== Presidential election ===
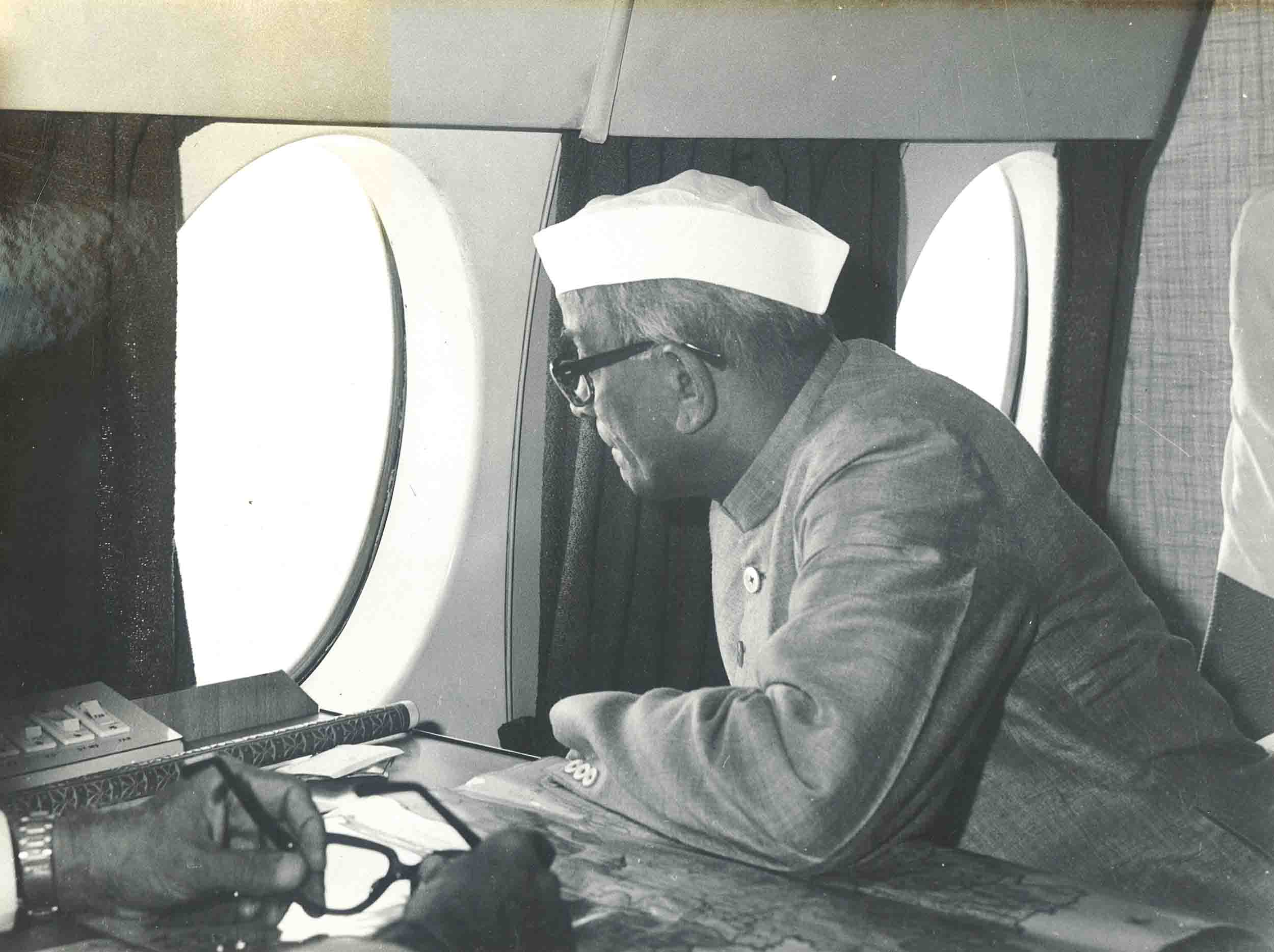
President Reddy doing an aerial survey of flood affected areas of Tamil Nadu in 1977.

Neelam Sanjiva Reddy was elected on 21 July 1977 and was sworn in as the sixth President of India on 25 July 1977. Reddy worked with three governments, with Prime Ministers Morarji Desai, Charan Singh and Indira Gandhi. Reddy announced, on the eve of India's thirtieth anniversary of Independence, that he would be moving out of the Rashtrapati Bhawan to a smaller accommodation and that he would be taking a 70 percent pay cut in solidarity with India's impoverished masses.

=== Morarji Desai government (1977–79) ===
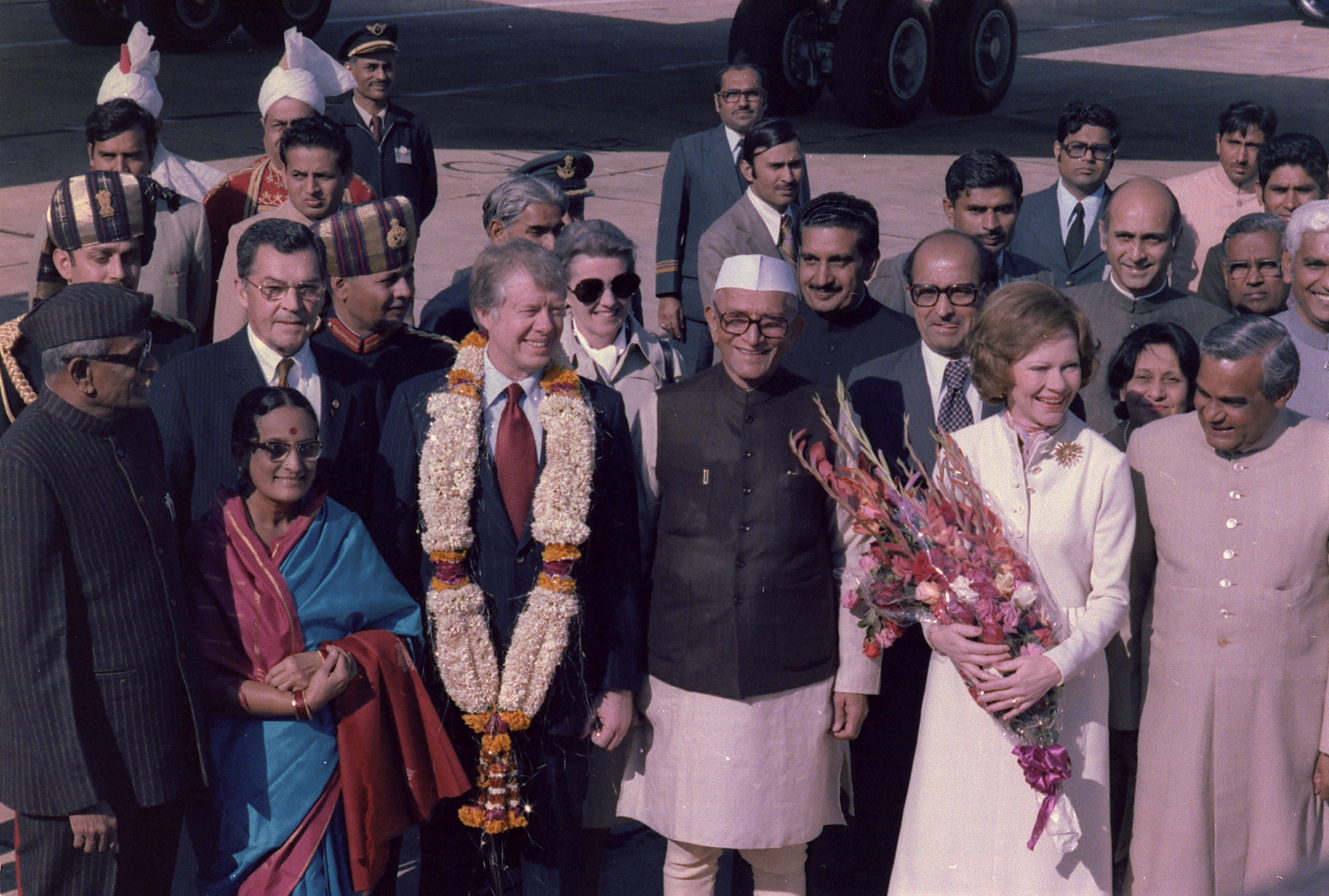
President Jimmy Carter visited India during January 1–3, 1978. Seen in this picture of his reception at the airport in Delhi are (from left to right) President Neelam Sanjiva Reddy, his wife, Jimmy Carter, Prime Minister Morarji Desai, the Indian Ambassador to the United States Nanabhoy Palkhivala, First Lady of the United States Rosalynn Carter and the External Affairs Minister Atal Bihari Vajpayee.

Relations between Reddy and Desai soon soured over the latter's promotion of his son, Kanti Desai, in politics and over Desai's communication with Chief Ministers Vengala Rao and Channa Reddy on the issue of land ceilings in Andhra Pradesh. Following mass defections from the Janata Party and from the cabinet, Morarji Desai's 30-month-old government ended in July 1979 after he handed in his resignation to Reddy before a no-confidence motion could be tabled against his government in Parliament. Reddy's actions following Desai's resignation have been much debated. His decision to accept Desai's resignation before an alternative government created a ministerial vacuum in the executive according to H. M. Seervai. The faction of the Janata Party supporting Desai continued to have the support of 205 MPs as opposed to Charan Singh's 80 MPs. Reddy used presidential discretion in choosing Charan Singh as the next Prime Minister over a contending claim from Jagjivan Ram, the leader of the Janata Party.

=== Charan Singh government (1979) ===
Following Desai's resignation and the fall of the Janata government headed by him, Reddy appointed Charan Singh as prime minister. This was on the condition that he should prove his majority on the floor of the House before the end of August. Singh was sworn in on 28 July 1979 but never faced Parliament to prove his majority when Reddy convened it on 20 August. Reddy had appointed him Prime Minister since he had produced a letter claiming to have a parliamentary majority with the support of the opposition Congress Party led by his rival, the former Prime Minister Indira Gandhi. In return for her support, Gandhi demanded that a law establishing special courts to try her and her son Sanjay Gandhi be repealed – a proposition that was unacceptable to Charan Singh. Gandhi therefore withdrew her support, forcing Singh to resign. His government lasted 24 days and he never faced Parliament. The convention of appointing a prime minister in a hung House but with conditions on time to prove majority was later adopted by President R Venkataraman.

Following Charan Singh's resignation, Reddy summoned Chandrashekhar and Jagjivan Ram to Rashtrapati Bhavan to look into the possibility of forming an alternate government. Reddy, convinced that they would not be able to form one, accepted Singh's advice and dissolved Lok Sabha, calling for a mid term election. (Note: Reddy's choice was between accepting the outgoing Prime Minister Charan Singh's advice of dissolving the Lok Sabha or giving Jagjivan Ram, leader of the Janata Party, the largest single bloc there, a chance of forming the government. Reddy was advised on the possibility of horse trading and accepted Singh's advice. Jagjivan Ram's claim to having a majority were overlooked and elections called prompting accusations of racial prejudice and political one upmanship against Reddy.) Singh was asked to continue as the caretaker prime minister till a new government was sworn in after the election. Reddy's decision was met with angry denunciations and protests by members of the Janata Party who even threatened to have him impeached. Although heading a caretaker government, Singh proposed as many as seven ordinances on a broad range of matters from effecting changes in company law, providing state funding of elections and reservation of jobs for the backward classes. Reddy however refused to promulgate the ordinances arguing that such momentous changes could not be made by a caretaker government.

=== Indira Gandhi's return to power (1980–82) ===
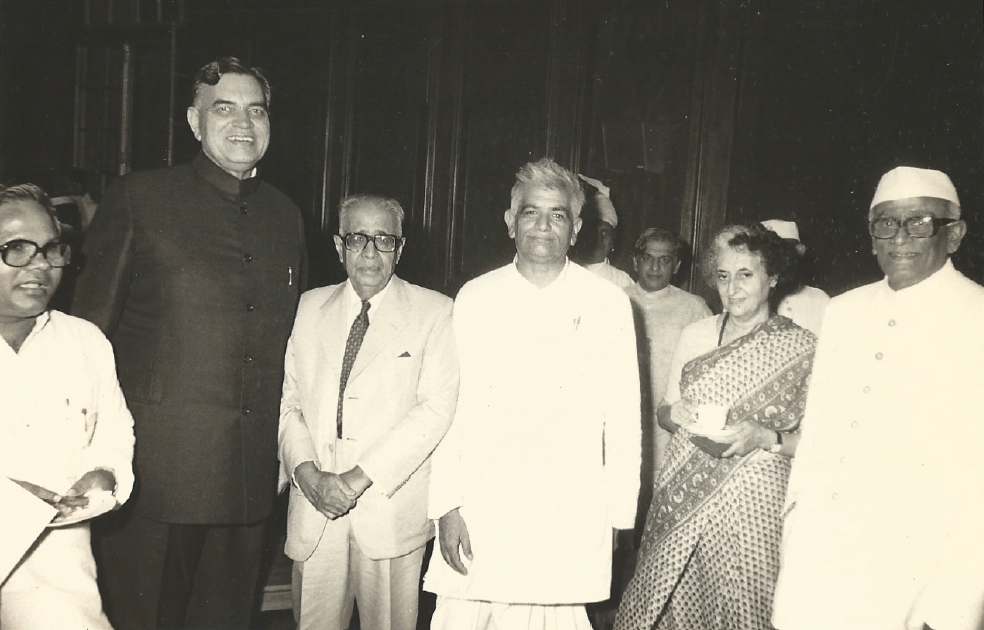
Seen here (from left to right) are Speaker of the Lok Sabha Balram Jakhar, Vice President Mohammad Hidayatullah, Mani Ram Bagri, Prime Minister Indira Gandhi and President Neelam Sanjiva Reddy.

In the elections of 1980, Indira Gandhi's party the Indian National Congress (I) returned to power by winning 351 seats in the Lok Sabha. Neither the Janata Party nor Charan Singh's Janata Party Secular (which later known as Lok Dal) won the 54 seats needed for recognition as the official opposition in Parliament. Indira was sworn in as prime minister by Reddy for what would become her last term in office in January 1980. Between 1980 and 1982 President Reddy led seven state visits abroad, visiting the USSR, Bulgaria, Kenya, Zambia, the UK, Ireland, Indonesia, Nepal, Sri Lanka and Yugoslavia. At home, as president, he signed an ordinance that gave the new government wide powers to imprison people for up to a year without trial under preventive detention and ordered the imposition of President's rule in nine opposition-ruled states on the advice of the government.

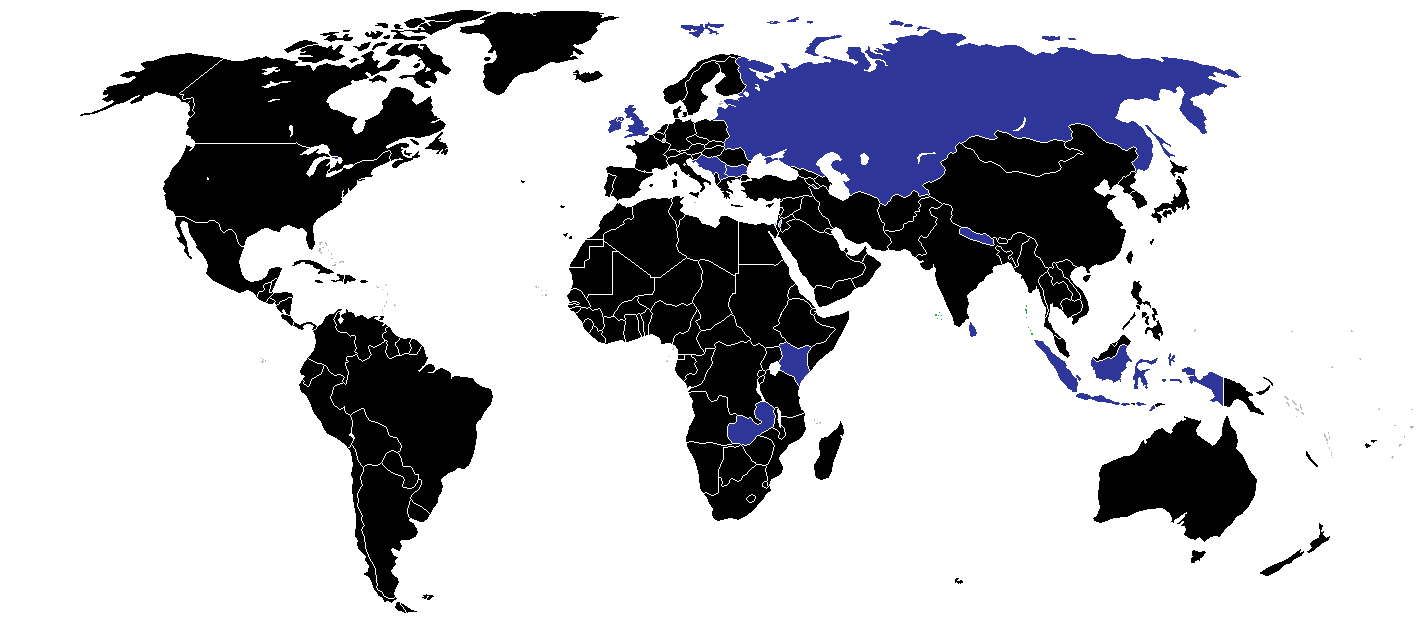
President Neelam Sanjiva Reddy led seven state visits between 1980 and 1982. He visited USSR, Bulgaria, Kenya, Zambia, UK, Ireland, Indonesia, Nepal, Sri Lanka, Ireland and Yugoslavia.

== Later life and death ==
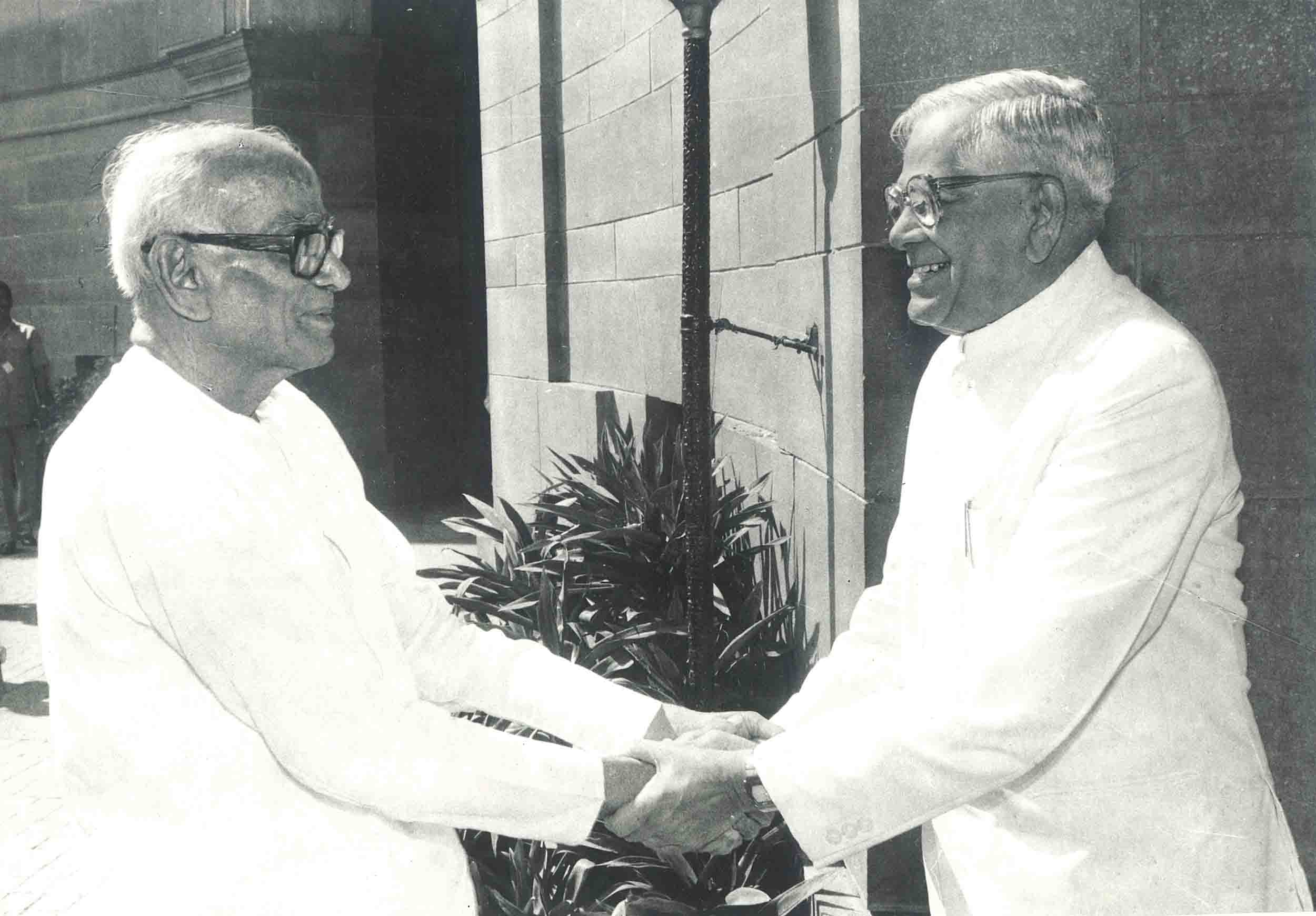
President R. Venkataraman with Neelam Sanjiva Reddy at the Rashtrapati Bhavan.

Reddy was succeeded as president by Giani Zail Singh, who was sworn in on 25 July 1982. In his farewell address to the nation, Reddy criticised the failure of successive governments in improving the lives of the Indian masses and called for the emergence of a strong political opposition to prevent governmental misrule. Following his presidential term, the then Chief Minister of Karnataka Ramakrishna Hegde invited Reddy to settle down in Bangalore but he chose to retire to his farm in Anantapur. He died of pneumonia in Bangalore in 1996 at the age of 83. His samadhi is at Kalpally Burial Ground, Bangalore. Parliament mourned Reddy's death on 11 June 1996 and members cutting across party lines paid him tribute and recalled his contributions to the nation and the House.

Reddy authored a book, Without Fear or Favour: Reminiscences and Reflections of a President, published in 1989.

== Commemoration ==
Sanjiva Reddy's birth centenary was celebrated in 2013 by the Government of Andhra Pradesh with the concluding ceremony in Anantapur being addressed by President Pranab Mukherjee and with the Chief Ministers of Andhra Pradesh and Karnataka in attendance. The Postal Department of India released a commemorative stamp and special cover in honour of Reddy on the occasion of his birth centenary. In Hyderabad, there is the Neelam Sanjeeva Reddy College of Education. As part of the centenary celebrations of his birth, the Government of Andhra Pradesh has announced that it will rename the Andhra Pradesh State Revenue Academy, Reddy's alma mater the Government Arts College and the Government Medical College, Anantapur after the former president. In the 1960s, when he was Union Minister for Mines, a statue of him had been unveiled at Vijayawada by K. Kamaraj, the then president of the Congress Party, prompting Reddy to ask for its removal as he deemed the practice of erecting statues of people holding public office undesirable. A statue of Sanjiva Reddy, unveiled in 2005, stands at the Andhra Pradesh Secretariat (now Telangana Secretariat) in Hyderabad.

== In popular culture ==
Neelam Sanjiva Reddy – President of India is a 1982 short documentary film directed by Prem Vaidya & C. L. Kaul and produced by the Films Division of India, covering his term of presidency.

The character Mahendranath, Chief Minister of the fictional state of Afrozabad in former Prime Minister P V Narasimha Rao's novel, The Insider, is based on Reddy, portraying his career in Andhra Pradesh and his political rivalry with Kasu Brahmananda Reddy. 121. http://wwww.agrasri.org.in 122. The Hans India, 20 May 2023, Tirupati Edition, https://epaper.thehansindia.com/Home/ArticleView?eid=5&edate=20/05/2023&pgid=118591 123. The Hans India, 20 May 2024, Tirupati Edition, https://epaper.thehansindia.com/Home/ArticleView?eid=5&edate=20/05/2024&pgid=160976

== Explanatory notes ==
Political offices
Preceded by Burgula Ramakrishna Rao as Chief Minister of Hyderabad	Chief Minister of Andhra Pradesh; 1956–1960	Succeeded by Damodaram Sanjivayya
Preceded by Bezawada Gopala Reddy as Chief Minister of Andhra	Chief Minister of Andhra Pradesh; 1956–1960	Succeeded by Damodaram Sanjivayya
Preceded by Damodaram Sanjivayya	Chief Minister of Andhra Pradesh; 1962–1964	Succeeded by Kasu Brahmananda Reddy
Preceded by Basappa Danappa Jatti as Acting President	President of India; 1977–1982	Succeeded by Zail Singh
Lok Sabha
Preceded by Sardar Hukam Singh	Speaker of the Lok Sabha; 1967–1969	Succeeded by Gurdial Singh Dhillon
Preceded by Bali Ram Bhagat	Speaker of the Lok Sabha; 1977	Succeeded by Kawdoor Sadananda Hegde
Party political offices
Preceded by Indira Gandhi	President of the Indian National Congress; 1960–1963	Succeeded by K. Kamaraj
