= S. V. Krishnamoorthy Rao =

Indian politician

3rd Deputy Speaker of the Lok Sabha
- In office 23 April 1962 – 3 March 1967
- Speaker: Hukam Singh
- Preceded by: Hukam Singh
- Succeeded by: Raghunath Keshav Khadilkar

1st Deputy Chairman of the Rajya Sabha
- In office 31 May 1952 – 1 March 1962
- Chairman: Dr. Radhakrishnan
- Preceded by: Office Established
- Succeeded by: Violet Alva

Member of Parliament, Rajya Sabha
- In office 3 April 1952 – 1 March 1962
- Constituency: Mysore State

Member of Parliament, Lok Sabha
- In office 1962–1967
- Preceded by: K.G. Wodeyar
- Succeeded by: J. H. Patel
- Constituency: Shimoga

Personal details
- Born: 15 November 1902 Shimoga, Mysore State, British India
- Died: 18 November 1968 (aged 66)
- Party: Indian National Congress
- Profession: Politician
- Known for: First Deputy Chairman of the Rajya Sabha

S. V. Krishnamoorthy Rao (15 November 1902 – 18 November 1968) was an Indian politician serving in the Indian National Congress. He was a member of the Upper House of the Indian Parliament the Rajya Sabha from 1952 to 1962. He was also the Deputy Chairman of the Rajya Sabha. He was elected to the Lower House of Parliament the Lok Sabha from the Shimoga, Mysore State in 1962 and was the Deputy Speaker of the Lok Sabha from 1962 to 1967.
