= Violet Alva =

Indian politician

Violet Hari Alva
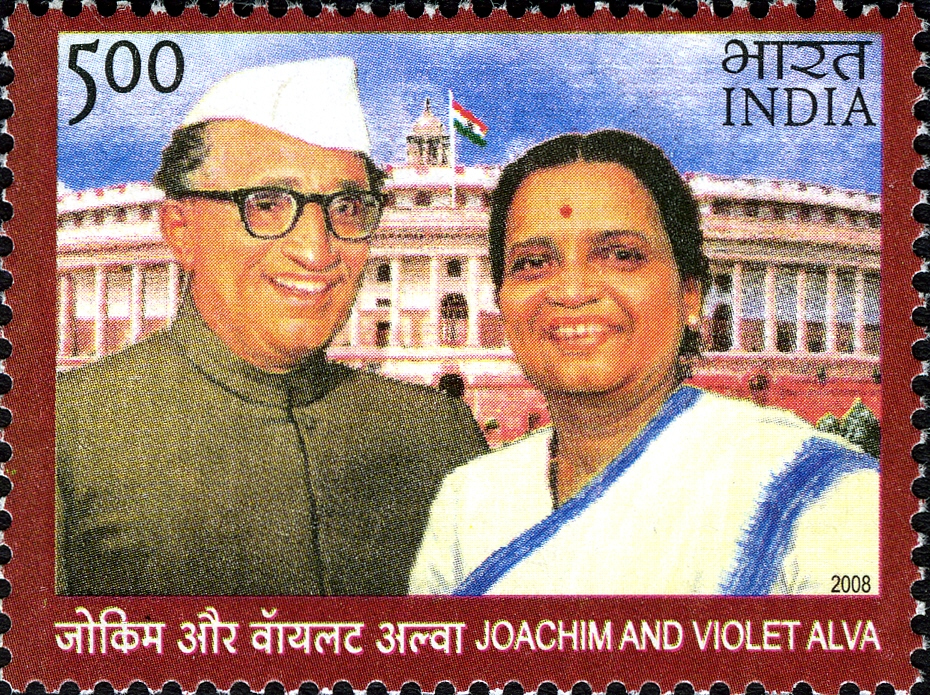
- Joachim and Violet Alva on a 2008 stamp of India

2nd Deputy Chairperson of the Rajya Sabha
- In office 19 April 1962 – 16 November 1969
- Chairman: Zakir Husain
- Preceded by: S. V. Krishnamoorthy Rao
- Succeeded by: B. D. Khobragade

Member of Parliament, Rajya Sabha
- In office 3 April 1952 – 2 April 1960
- Constituency: Karnataka

Personal details
- Born: Violet Hari; 24 April 1908 Ahmedabad, Bombay Presidency, British India (present-day Gujarat, India)
- Died: 20 November 1969 (aged 61) New Delhi, India
- Cause of death: Cerebral hemorrhage
- Party: Indian National Congress
- Spouse: Joachim Alva (m. 1937)
- Occupation: Lawyer; Journalist; Politician
- Known for: First Woman Deputy Chairman of the Rajya Sabha

Violet Hari Alva (24 April 1908 – 20 November 1969) was an Indian lawyer, journalist and politician, and Deputy Chairperson of the Rajya Sabha, and member of the Indian National Congress (INC). She was the first woman lawyer to appear before a High Court in India and the first to preside over the Rajya Sabha.

== Early life ==
Alva was born Violet Hari on 24 April 1908 in Ahmedabad. She was the eighth of nine children. Violet's father, Reverend Laxman Hari, was an Indian pastor of the Church of England. Having lost both her parents when she was sixteen, her older siblings provided for her education until her matriculation at Bombay's Clare Road Convent. She graduated from St. Xavier's College, Bombay and Government Law College. For a while thereafter, she was a professor of English at the Indian Women's University, Bombay.

== Career ==
In 1944, she was the first woman advocate in India, to argue a case before a full High Court. In 1944, Alva also started a women’s magazine, The Begum, later renamed as Indian Women. From 1946 to 1947, she served as the deputy chairman of Bombay Municipal Corporation. In 1947, Alva served as an Honorary Magistrate in Mumbai; and from 1948 to 1954, she served as the President of the Juvenile Court. She was actively involved with numerous social organisations such as Young Women’s Christian Association, the Business and Professional Women’s Association and the International Federation of Women Lawyers. She was also the first woman to be elected to the Standing Committee of the All India Newspaper Editors Conference in 1952.

In 1952, Alva was elected to the Rajya Sabha, the Upper House of the Indian Parliament, where she made significant contributions to family planning, rights of animals subjected to research and defence strategy, especially the naval sector. She cautioned the government to be careful when dealing with foreign capital and supported linguistic states.

From 1955, Alva was secretariat and preparatory committee member of the Asian Solidarity Committee, conceived of by the World Peace Council. The Committee, which later expanded into the Afro-Asian People's Solidarity Organisation, brought together representatives from India, Burma, China, Japan, Pakistan, North Vietnam, South Vietnam, North Korea, Syria, the Soviet Union and more to campaign against imperialism, weapons of mass destruction, all forms of discrimination and for solidarity, sovereignty, peace and self-determination.

After the second Indian General Election in 1957, Alva became Deputy Minister of State for Home Affairs.

In 1962, Alva became the Deputy Chairman of the Rajya Sabha, thereby becoming the first female to preside over the Rajya Sabha in its history. She served two consecutive terms in Rajya Sabha. Her first term commenced on 19 April 1962 and continued until 2 April 1966. Her second term began with her election to the office of Deputy Chairman on 7 April 1966 and she held the position until 16 November 1969.

In 1969, Alva resigned after Indira Gandhi declined to back her as Vice-President of India.

== Personal life ==
In 1937, Violet Hari married journalist, lawyer and later freedom fighter and parliamentarian Joachim Alva. The couple set up legal practice together. The Alvas had two sons, Niranjan and Chittaranjan, and a daughter, Maya. In 1943, Violet Alva was arrested by British Indian authorities. She carried her five-month old baby son, Chittaranjan, into Arthur Road Jail where she was imprisoned. Her son Niranjan is married to Margaret Alva, née Margaret Nazareth who served as former General Secretary of the All India Congress Committee, former Governor of Uttarakhand, Rajasthan, Gujarat and Goa.

=== Death and legacy ===
Five days after she resigned as the deputy chairperson of the Rajya Sabha, at 7:45 a.m. (IST) on 20 November 1969, she died from cerebral hemorrhage at her residence in New Delhi. Following Alva's death, both Houses of the Parliament were adjourned for a short interval that day as a mark of respect to her. Prime Minister Indira Gandhi described her as a "affable and dedicated worker to the national cause who had blazed a trail for women to follow." She added that in Alva's tenure as the Deputy Chairperson of the Rajya Sabha, she was gentle but firm when conducting the proceedings. Chairman of the Rajya Sabha Gopal Swarup Pathak, recalling Alva's participation in the Quit India Movement, felt that she left a "tradition of dignity and impartiality." Atal Bihari Vajpayee, then, a leader of the Bharatiya Jana Sangh, recollected that she had carried her five-month old baby into the jail during the Movement and felt that she had not been treated fairly by the INC. Leaders across the political spectrum such as Era Sezhiyan, A. K. Gopalan and Nirmal Chandra Chatterjee also paid their tributes to Alva and commended her for having lived a life of simplicity.

In 2007, a portrait of Joachim and Violet Alva, the first Parliamentarian couple in history, was unveiled in Parliament. In 2008, the year of Violet's birth centenary, a stamp commemorating the couple was issued by the Government of India.

== See also ==
- First women lawyers around the world
