= Ratnakar Pandey =

Indian politician (died 2018)

Dr Ratnakar Pandey was a veteran Indian National Congress leader from Uttar Pradesh. He was the former Member of Parliament representing Indian National Congress in the Rajya Sabha the upper house of India's Parliament. He is referred one of the closest to former Prime Minister Indira Gandhi, Rajiv Gandhi and former UPA Chairperson Smt.Sonia Gandhi. Pandey, well known for his knowledge of Hindi and its promotion as an official language, was a graduate of Banaras Hindu University and played a key role in organising World Hindi Conferences abroad. Pandey was also known as a member of the "shouting brigade" in the Rajya Sabha. Dr Pandey died on 1 September 2018 after a prolonged illness.
