= Scato Swu =

Indian politician

Scato Swu (1924-7 April 2014) was an Indian social worker and politician from Nagaland. He was nominated as a member of Rajya Sabha in 1974 and served two terms till 1986.

Born in April 1924 at Kilomi Village in Nagaland, he was educated at Kohima American Baptist School and St. Edmund's College, Shillong. A social worker, Mr. Swu was actively involved with the welfare of Naga people and was instrumental in evolving a political settlement in Nagaland. He died on 7 April 2014 at the age of 90.

== Sources ==
- Brief Biodata
