= Niranjan Singh Talib =

Sardar Niranjan Singh Talib (1901–1976), was a journalist, an independence activist, revolutionary and influential leader of Indian National Congress leader and also served as Punjab Pradesh Congress Chief. He was a noted Gandhian and joined the Non-cooperation movement on call of Mahatma Gandhi in 1920. He was editor of nationalist daily Punjabi newspaper Desh Darpan, which was once published from Calcutta. Further, he was also a close associate of Netaji Subhas Chandra Bose and at one point of time associated closely with All India Forward Bloc as many sources claim, he drove the car, in which Netaji escaped from his house arrest in Calcutta. Before independence, he spent around 10 years in total in various jails in British India. Earlier he served as personal aide of Maharaja of Nabha, Ripudaman Singh, till the King was deposed. After independence served as Minister in Punjab Government as Public Works Department minister and also Head of Capital Project, Public Health, Engineering and Housing, which founded Chandigarh as newly developed capital city. In 1962 he won election from Chandigarh, as a Congress party candidate. He served as member of Rajya Sabha from Punjab for the years 1974 till his death in 1976.
