= 1985 Rajya Sabha elections =

Rajya Sabha elections were held on various dates in 1985, to elect members of the Rajya Sabha, Indian Parliament's upper chamber.

== Elections ==
Elections were held to elect members from various states.

=== Members elected ===
The following members are elected in the elections held in 1985. They are members for the term 1985–1991 and retire in year 1991, except in case of the resignation or death before the term. The list is incomplete.

State - Member - Party

Rajya Sabha members for term 1985–1991
State	Member Name	Party	Remark
Jammu and Kashmir	Tirath Ram Amla	INC	R
Kerala	N E Balaram	CPI	
Kerala	Thomas Kuthiravattom	KC	
Nominated	Purushottam Kakodkar	INC	
Puducherry	V Narayanasamy	INC	

== Bye-elections ==
The following bye elections were held in the year 1985.

State - Member - Party

1. Nominated -- H L Kapur -- INC ( ele 03/01/1985 term till 1988 ) res 14/11/1985
2. Uttar Pradesh -- Kamlapati Tripathi -- INC ( ele 19/01/1985 term till 1986 )
3. Uttar Pradesh -- Anand Prakash Gautam -- INC ( ele 28/01/1985 term till 1986 )
4. Uttar Pradesh -- Kapil Verma -- INC ( ele 28/01/1985 term till 1986 )
5. Uttar Pradesh -- Achchey Lal Balmik -- INC ( ele 28/01/1985 term till 1986 )
6. Uttar Pradesh -- Dr Faguni Ram -- INC ( ele 28/01/1985 term till 1988 )
7. Uttar Pradesh --Sushila Rohtagi -- INC ( ele 28/01/1985 term till 1988 )
8. Uttar Pradesh -- Smt Kailashpati -- INC ( ele 11/02/1985 term till 1988 )
9. West Bengal - Dr R K Poddar - CPM ( ele 12/03/1985 term till 1987 )
10. West Bengal - Gurudas Dasgupta - CPM ( ele 12/03/1985 term till 1988 )
11. Uttar Pradesh - Makhan Lal Fotedar - INC ( ele 09/05/1985 term till 1990 )
12. Gujarat - P Shiv Shankar - INC ( ele 10/05/1985 term till 1987 )
13. Maharashtra - Pratibha Devisingh Patil - INC ( ele 05/07/1985 term till 1990 )
14. Maharashtra - Maruti Mane Patil - INC ( ele 05/07/1985 term till 1986 )
15. Rajashthan - B L Panwar - INC ( ele 02/07/1985 term till 1986 )
16. Rajashthan - Dr H P Sharma- INC ( ele 02/07/1985 term till 1988 )
17. Nominated - Salim Ali - NOM ( ele 4/09/1985 term till 1988 ) dea 20/06/1987
18. Uttar Pradesh - Narayan Dutt Tiwari - INC ( ele 02/12/1985 term till 1986 )
19. West Bengal - Chitta Basu - CPM ( ele 02/12/1985 term till 1990 ) 27/11/1989
