= Najma Heptulla =

Indian politician

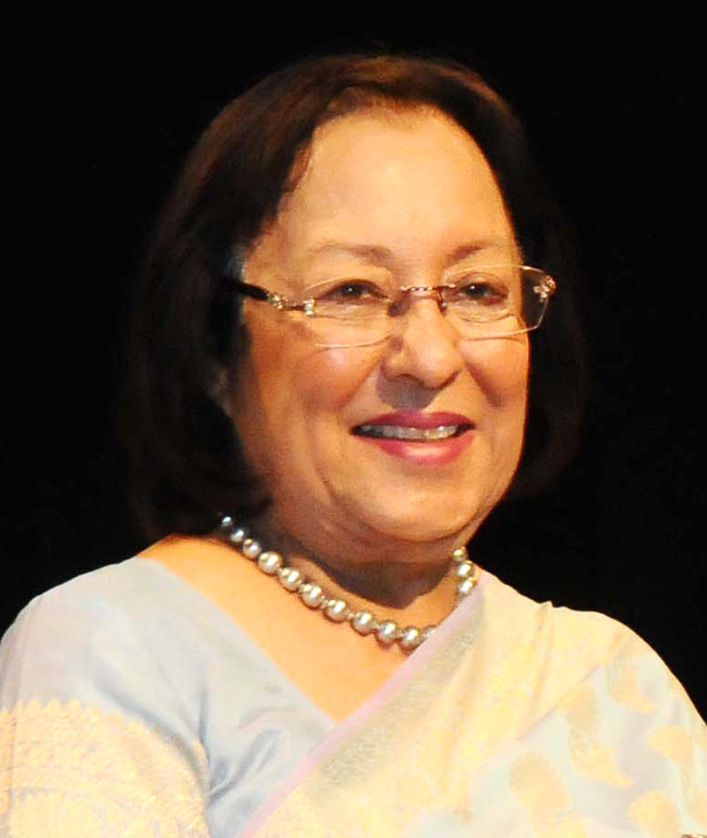
- Heptulla in 2016

16th Governor of Manipur
- In office 24 July 2019 – 10 August 2021
- Chief Minister: Nongthombam Biren Singh
- Preceded by: Padmanabha Acharya (Addl. Charge)
- Succeeded by: Ganga Prasad (Addl. Charge)
- In office 26 June 2018 – 26 June 2019
- Chief Minister: Nongthombam Biren Singh
- Preceded by: Jagdish Mukhi (Addl. Charge)
- Succeeded by: Padmanabha Acharya (Addl. Charge)
- In office 21 August 2016 – 31 May 2018
- Chief Minister: Okram Ibobi Singh; Nongthombam Biren Singh
- Preceded by: V. Shanmuganathan
- Succeeded by: Jagdish Mukhi (Addl. Charge)

11th Chancellor of Jamia Millia Islamia
- In office 26 May 2017 – 13 March 2023
- Vice Chancellor: Talat Ahmad; Najma Akhtar
- Preceded by: Mohammad Ahmed Zaki
- Succeeded by: Mufaddal Saifuddin

Minister of Minority Affairs
- In office 26 May 2014 – 12 July 2016
- Prime Minister: Narendra Modi
- Preceded by: K. Rahman Khan
- Succeeded by: Mukhtar Abbas Naqvi

7th Deputy Chairman of the Rajya Sabha
- In office 11 November 1988 – 10 June 2004
- Chairman: K R Narayan, Krishnan Kant, Bhairon Sheakhawat
- Preceded by: Pratibha Patil
- Succeeded by: K. Rahman Khan
- In office 25 January 1985 – 20 January 1986
- Chairman: Ramaswamy Venkataraman (1986–1987); Mohammed Hidtmaullh
- Preceded by: Shyamlal Yadav
- Succeeded by: M. M. Jacob

Member of Parliament, Rajya Sabha
- In office 3 April 2012 – 20 August 2016
- Constituency: Madhya Pradesh
- In office 2004–2010
- Constituency: Rajasthan
- In office 1980–2004
- Constituency: Maharashtra

Personal details
- Born: 13 April 1940 (age 86) Bhopal, Bhopal State, British India (present-day Madhya Pradesh, India)
- Party: Bharatiya Janata Party (since 2004)
- Other political affiliations: Indian National Congress (1960s–2004)
- Spouse: Akbar Ali Akhtar Heptulla (m. 1966; died 2007)
- Children: 3
- Education: Vikram University

Najma Akbar Ali Heptulla (born 13 April 1940) is an Indian politician. She was the Chancellor of Jamia Millia Islamia from 2017 to 2023, until Syedna Mufaddal Saifuddin was elected as new Chancellor on 14 March 2023. She was a six time member of the Rajya Sabha, the upper house of the Indian parliament, between 1980 and 2016, and the longest serving Deputy Chairman of the Rajya Sabha for sixteen years when she was a member of Congress. Later she was nominated vice-president of Bharatiya Janata Party (BJP) in 2007, and was a minister from 2014-2016 as a member of BJP in Narendra Modi's first government. From 2016 to 2021, she served as the 16th Governor of Manipur.

She is a second cousin to actor Aamir Khan and grand niece of Maulana Abul Kalam Azad. She contested the 13th vice-presidential election held in August 2007 but lost to Hamid Ansari by 233 votes. She took oath as a cabinet minister in the Narendra Modi headed government on 26 May 2014 and was replaced by Mukhtar Abbas Naqvi in July 2016.

== Early life and background ==
Najma was born as Sayyida Najma bint Yusuf on 13 April 1940 in Bhopal, Bhopal State, in present Madhya Pradesh to Sayyid Yusuf bin Ali Al Hashmi and Sayyida Fatima bint Mahmood. She is a Dawoodi Bohra Ismaili Shia Gujarati with Arab ancestry, as traced by her ancestral roots in the Arabian Peninsula as well as Gujarat state. She did her schooling at Motilal Vigyan Mahavidyalaya (MVM) Bhopal, and obtained an M.Sc. and a Ph.D. degree, both in Zoology (Cardiac Anatomy) from Vikram University, Ujjain.

She married Akbar Ali Akhtar Heptulla in 1966, and has three daughters. Her husband, Akbar Ali Akhtar Heptulla, a manpower consultant, was instrumental in the establishment of the Patriot newspaper in the 1960s. He died on 4 September 2007, in New Delhi at the age of 75.

== Career ==
She steadily climbed up in the Indian National Congress party, heading several divisions of the party's grassroots organisations. She was the General Secretary of Congress during 1986 with the additional responsibility of youth activities of the All India Congress Committee and the NSUI. Since 1980, she was a member of the Rajya Sabha from Maharashtra for four terms, elected in 1980, 1986, 1992, 1998 as Congress candidate. Najma was the Deputy Chairperson of the Rajya Sabha from January 1985 to January 1986 and from 1988 to July 2004.

Heptulla joined Bharatiya Janata Party in 2004. Media sources reported that she left the Congress apparently due to a strain in relationship with Congress president Sonia Gandhi. Later she alleged that she was personally humiliated by Sonia Gandhi. She declared that she was leaving the party due to the problems with party leadership. In 2007, BJP-led NDA fielded her as a candidate in the elections for the Vice-President of India, which was won by Hamid Ansari.

She was a member of Rajya Sabha, representing Rajasthan for BJP from July 2004 to July 2010. She was nominated by the BJP for the Rajya Sabha in 2012 from Madhya Pradesh, and assumed her office on 24 April 2012 upon election. Under Nitin Gadkari as BJP President, she became one of the 13 vice-presidents of the BJP in 2010, where later when Rajnath Singh took over, she was made a member of the party's national executive. Heptulla served as the Minister of Minority Affairs in Prime minister Narendra Modi's cabinet from 26 May 2014 to 12 July 2016. She said that minorities needed a level playing field in Indian society, but reservation is not the solution as it kills the spirit of competition.

She resigned from her positions as a minister and a member of Rajya Sabha in 2016 when she was nominated Governor of Manipur.

Heptulla was nominated to head the Indian Council for Cultural Relations, ICCR. She also presided over the women parliamentarians' group of the Inter-Parliamentary Union in 1993 and became founder president of the parliamentarians' forum for human development the same year. She was also elected President of Inter-Parliamentary Union (IPU), a Geneva-based international organisation at Council's 165th session in Berlin in 1999. She held the post from 16 October 1999 to 27 September 2002. Subsequently, in 2002, at Council's 171st session, she was chosen the Honorary President of the IPU Council. Heptulla was nominated by the United Nations Development Programme as its human development ambassador. Heptulla led a delegation to the UN Commission on Status of Women in 1997.

Heptulla has authored book on AIDS titled "AIDS: Approaches to Prevention". She has also written on human social security, sustainable development, environment, reforms for women and on ties between India and west Asia.

Heptulla faced charges of having morphed a 1958 photograph to show her along with Maulana Abul Kalam Azad in a publication of the Indian Council of Cultural Relations (ICCR). The controversial photograph was published in an ICCR publication titled 'Journey of a legend', on the life of Maulana Azad, a noted scholar and the country's first education minister. He was also the first chairperson of the ICCR and the publication came out when the council was headed by Heptulla. The photograph came with an introduction and showed a young Heptulla with the Maulana. The caption read "Najma Heptulla with Maulana Azad after her graduation". This gave the game away as official inquiries later revealed Heptulla had graduated in May 1958, whereas the Maulana had died on 22 February 1958. The publication was later withdrawn by the ICCR and its revised version is released but without the controversial photograph. Delhi High court had directed the CBI to investigate the case on a public interest litigation filed by ICCR Employees Association president.

== Election History ==
=== Rajya Sabha ===
Position	Party	Constituency	From	To	Tenure
Member of Parliament, Rajya Sabha (1st Term)	INC(I)	Maharashtra	5 July 1980	4 July 1986	5 years, 364 days
Member of Parliament, Rajya Sabha (2nd Term)	INC(I)	Maharashtra	5 July 1986	4 July 1992	5 years, 365 days
Member of Parliament, Rajya Sabha (3rd Term)	INC(I)	Maharashtra	5 July 1992	4 July 1998	5 years, 364 days
Member of Parliament, Rajya Sabha (4th Term)	INC(I)	Maharashtra	5 July 1998	10 June 2004	5 years, 341 days
Member of Parliament, Rajya Sabha (5th Term)	BJP	Rajasthan	5 July 2004	4 July 2010	5 years, 364 days
Member of Parliament, Rajya Sabha (6th Term)	BJP	Madhya Pradesh	3 April 2012	20 August 2016	4 years, 139 days

== Awards and decorations ==
=== State honours ===
- Morocco:
  - Order of Ouissam Alaouite, Grand Cordon (February 2001)
- Russia:
  - Recipient of the Order of Friendship (2019)

=== Awards ===
- Recipient of the Outstanding Parliamentarian Award for the year 2013

Political offices
Preceded by Shyam Lal Yadav	Deputy Chairman of the Rajya Sabha; 1985–1986	Succeeded by M.M. Jacob
Preceded by Pratibha Patil	Deputy Chairman of the Rajya Sabha; 1988–2004	Succeeded by K. Rahman Khan
Preceded by K. Rahman Khan	Minister of Minority Affairs; 2014–2016	Succeeded by Mukhtar Abbas Naqvi; Minister of State with Independent Charge
Preceded by V. Shanmuganathan	Governor of Manipur; 21 August 2016 – 2021	Succeeded by La Ganeshan
