= Godey Murahari =

Indian politician

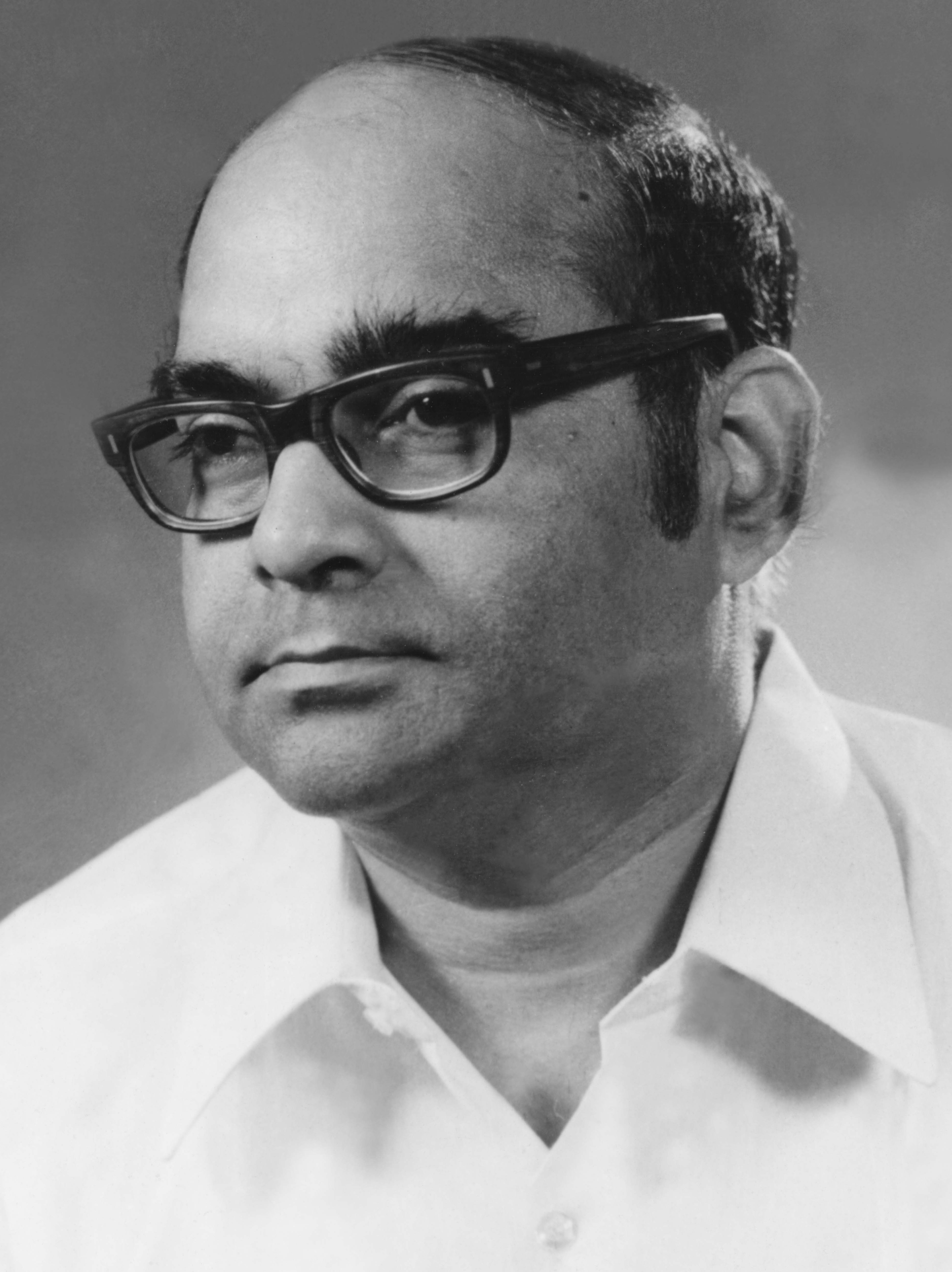
- Godey Murahari

Member of Parliament, Lok Sabha
- In office 1977 - 1980
- Preceded by: Kanuri Lakshmana Rao
- Succeeded by: Chennupati Vidya
- Constituency: Vijayawada

Deputy Speaker of the Lok Sabha
- In office 1 Apr 1977 – 22 Aug 1979
- Speaker: Neelam Sanjiva Reddy; K. S. Hegde
- Preceded by: George Gilbert Swell
- Succeeded by: G. Lakshmanan

Deputy Chairman of the Rajya Sabha
- In office Apr 1972– Mar 1977
- Chairman: B. D. Jatti

Godey Murahari (20 May 1926 – 1982) in Jamshedpur was former Deputy Speaker of 6th Lok Sabha and Member of Lok Sabha, Parliament of India. He was also member of Rajya Sabha from Uttar Pradesh from 1962 to 1977 and Rajya Sabha Deputy Chairman from 1972 to 1977. He belongs to Perika (Puragiri Kshatriya) caste. He died in 1982.
