= 8th Lok Sabha =

Lower House members elected in 1984

←	7th	9th	→
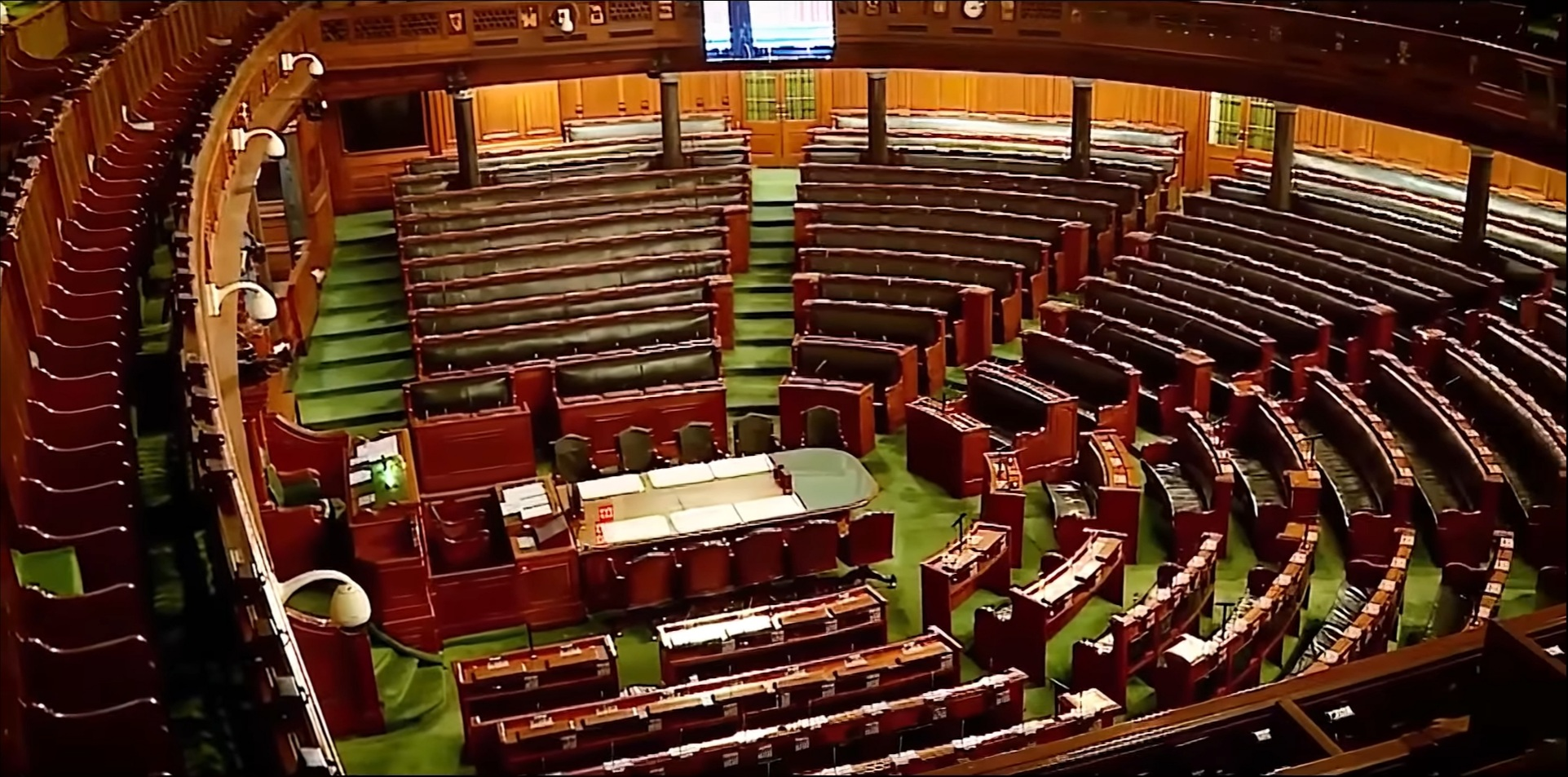
- View of Lok Sabha chamber in the Old Parliament House, New Delhi

Overview
- Legislative body: Indian Parliament
- Election: 1984 Indian general election

The 8th Lok Sabha ran from 31 December 1984 to 27 November 1989. Politicians were elected in December 1984, taking office by the end of the month. The Lok Sabha (House of the People) is the lower house in the bicameral Parliament of India. 9 sitting members from Rajya Sabha were elected to 8th Lok Sabha after the Indian general election, in 1984.

Rajiv Gandhi of Indian National Congress continued as Prime Minister till 2 December 1989. In this 8th Lok Sabha, INC party had 30 more seats than previous 7th Lok Sabha.

The next 9th Lok Sabha was formed on 2 December 1989, after the 1989 Indian general election.

== Important members ==
- Speaker:
  - Balram Jakhar from 16 January 1985 to 18 December 1989
- Deputy Speaker:
  - M. Thambi Durai from 22 January 1985 to 27 November 1989
- Secretary General:
  - Subhash C Kashyap from 31 December 1983 to 20 August 1990

== List of members by political party ==
Members of the political party in 8th Lok Sabha are given below:

S.No.	Party name	Number of MPs
1	Indian National Congress (INC)	426
2	Telugu Desam Party (TDP)	30
3	Communist Party of India (Marxist) (CPI(M))	23
4	Janata Party (Janata Party)	16
5	All India Anna Dravida Munnetra Kazhagam (AIADMK)	12
6	Independent (Ind.)	9
7	Akali Dal (Akali Dal)	7
8	Asom Gana Parishad (AGP)	7
9	Communist Party of India (CPI)	6
10	Congress (S) (Congress (S))	5
11	Lok Dal(Lok Dal)	4
12	Unattached (Unattached)	4
13	Jammu & Kashmir National Conference (JKN)	3
14	Revolutionary Socialist Party (India) (RSP)	3
15	All India Forward Bloc (AIFB)	2
16	Bharatiya Janata Party (BJP)	2
17	Dravida Munnetra Kazhagam (DMK)	2
18	Kerala Congress (M) (KC(M))	2
19	Indian Union Muslim League (IUML)	2
20	Nominated (NM)	2
