= Punjabi Suba movement =

1947–1966 political agitation in northern India

Coordinates: 31°00′N 76°00′E

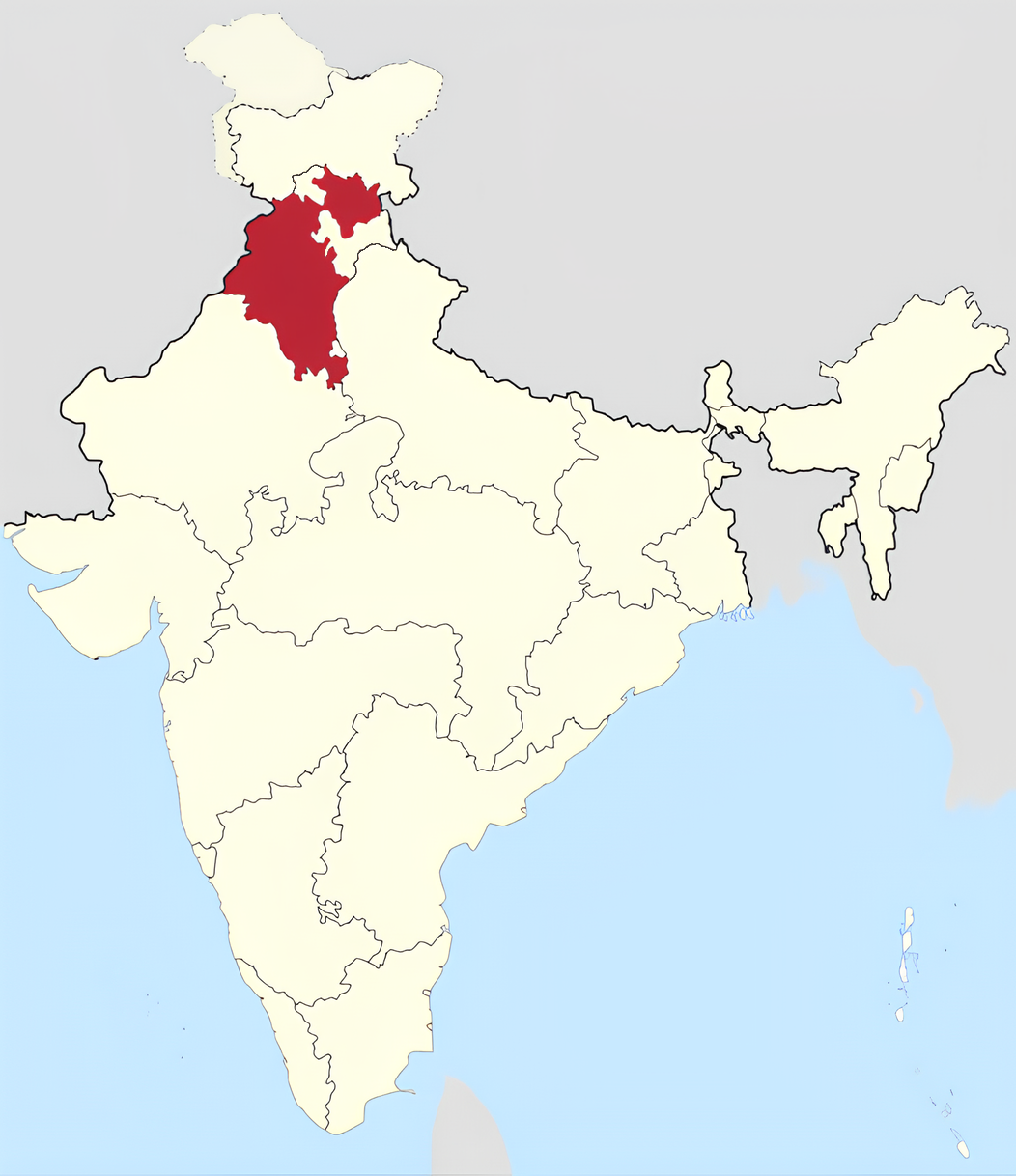
- The Punjab state in India from 1956 to 1966
- Date: 15 August 1947 – 1 November 1966
- Location: Punjab, India
- Goals: Creation of the constitutional autonomous federal state of Punjab, with Chandigarh as its capital, for Punjabi-speaking people from the bilingual Punjab state
- Methods: Protest marches and demonstrations, hunger strike, general strike
- Result: Formation of Punjab and Haryana states and the Union Territory of Chandigarh on 1 November 1966. Transfer of hill regions to Himachal Pradesh

Parties
Support: Sikhs; Shiromani Akali Dal	Against: Indian Government; Indian National Congress; Arya Samaj; Jan Sangh

Lead figures
Master Tara Singh (AD); Hukam Singh; Fateh Singh (AD); Darshan Singh Pheruman	Jawaharlal Nehru; Pratap Singh Kairon; Indira Gandhi; Ashwini Kumar; Lala Jagat Narain; Yagya Dutt Sharma

Casualties
- Death: At least 43
- Arrested: 57,129 Sikhs (Akali Dal records)

The Punjabi Suba movement was a political movement, launched by the Sikhs, demanding the creation of a Punjabi Suba, or Punjabi-speaking state, in the post-independence Indian state of Punjab. Led by the Akali Dal, it resulted in the formation of the state of Punjab. The state of Haryana and the Union Territory of Chandigarh were also created and some Pahari-majority parts of Punjab were also merged with Himachal Pradesh following the movement.

Borrowing from the pre-independence demands for a Sikh country, this movement demanded a fundamental constitutional autonomous state within India. The Sikhs also led efforts to preserve and have official status granted to the Punjabi language and Gurmukhi script.

The result of the movement left many unresolved issues, including the allocation of the capital city of Chandigarh as a union territory, significant Punjabi-speaking areas left out of the state, and the distribution of river waters. Like the following Khalistan movement, which it foreran, the Punjabi Subah movement also stressed the right of control over territory and water, and grew from demands for a substantive federal political structure.

== Partition era (1947-1949) ==
=== Conceptualization ===
Calls for the Punjabi Suba had been heard as far back as February 1947, and the demand for a Punjabi Suba as a policy position was first presented in April 1948 by Master Tara Singh of the Shiromani Akali Dal, a Sikh political party active mainly in Punjab. The movement was primarily conceived to secure a distinct Sikh political status as a safeguard for what was to be a small minority after independence; as Tara Singh wrote in 1945, "there is not the least doubt that the Sikh religion will live only as long as the Sikh panth exists as an organized entity." The Akali Dal considered the continued existence of the Sikh religion as predicated on the community acting as a consolidated political unit, which could only be effective with its own territorial unit. Regarding Sikh political participation as an integral to Sikh theology itself, as the Khalsa had been established in 1699 to organize religious Sikhs into a political community, one of Guru Gobind Singh's signature contributions to Sikhism, the party received strong support from its base by offering this political organization rooted in religious tradition.

The Cabinet Mission Plan had recognized Hindus, Muslims, and Sikhs as the three main communities. Both Congress and the Muslim League had offered allurements to woo the Sikhs to their respective nations. On 5 August 1944, Muhammad Ali Jinnah, in an attempt to retain all of Punjab, had assured the Sikhs of full rights and addressal of claims; he and Liaqat Ali Khan had offered a Sikh state within Pakistan with its own military establishment. Countering this, Vallabhbhai Patel had reaffirmed on 24 August 1945, the Congress Resolution of 1929 and promised on 5 April 1946: "Sikhistan issue will be considered in the Constituent Assembly after the transfer of power in the hands of the Indians." The Sikh leadership had opposed partition, but would opt for India based on the promises made by Hindu leaders like Nehru, Gandhi, and Patel in 1929, 1946 and 1947.

In 1946, the Akali Dal had submitted a memorandum to the British government in which it asserted that Pakistan should not be conceded to the Muslims without at the same time conceding a sovereign Sikh nation as well, a sentiment echoed until independence by Akali leaders, who adopted a resolution in favour of one in March 1946, variously referred to as Sikhistan or Khalistan. When Sikh statehood was rejected by the commission, sections of the Sikh community instead began to advocate for a homeland within the Indian Union.

=== Independence ===
Though it was commonly recognized at the time of independence that the Indian states were created not on a rational basis, but were the result of the exigencies of the progressive British conquest of the subcontinent, and Congress had been advocating the reorganization of provinces for over a quarter century prior, a commission that had been set up in 1948 by the Government of India, tasked with drawing up clean-cut states corresponding to demographic and linguistic boundaries, was not effective in the northern part of the country, as it reconsidered its position on the north. While states across the country were extensively redrawn on linguistic lines at the behest of linguistic groups, the only languages not considered for statehood were Punjabi, Sindhi and Urdu. Its jurisdiction was limited to the southern states, with northern India kept out of its purview, specifically to avoid problems like those of Punjab, in particular issues raised by the Sikhs.

==== Ambedkar ====
In January 1948, Akali Dal's three-member delegation of leaders, Harcharan Singh Bajwa, Bhupinder Singh Mann, and Giani Kartar Singh, met the Minister of Law and Justice Dr. B. R. Ambedkar. Ambedkar suggested that the Akali delegation demand a Punjabi-speaking state, or Punjabi Suba, as a Sikh state, since the central government had declared a commitment to a linguistic basis for the reorganization of the states.

Ambedkar was one of the earliest and strongest advocates of reorganizing Indian states on linguistic lines. In his 1955 book Thoughts on Linguistic States, he argued that linguistic reorganization would strengthen democracy, give cultural autonomy, and reduce domination by majority groups in composite provinces. This principle indirectly supported the Punjabi Suba demand, which was based on recognition of the Punjabi language and Sikh cultural identity. Ambedkar's suggestion to the Sikh delegation laid the foundation of the linguistically based Punjabi Suba.

=== Akali platform ===
The Sikh population, after the partition of Punjab, had become a majority population in a contiguous, strategic land area for the first time in its history, with a new socio-political position, This enabled the Akali Dal to focus on expressing unencumbered Sikh political needs, free from the politics of the former Muslim majority that had needed to be accommodated on its political platform prior to it, and provided the opportunity for Sikhs themselves to express a degree of autonomy from the sway of the Congress party and the central government, through the Akali Dal.

The Sikhs now constituted a majority in the northwestern seven districts of the thirteen districts of Punjab state at the time: Gurdaspur, Amritsar, Hoshiarpur, Jalandhar, Firozpur, Ludhiana, and Ambala, along with Patiala and East Punjab States Union, or PEPSU, which had been formed as an administrative unit on 5 May 1948 including the six Sikh princely states, and with sizable populations in surrounding districts.

Meanwhile, Hindus formed a majority in the remaining six districts, including the southeastern districts between PEPSU and Delhi (Hisar, Karnal, Rohtak, and Gurgaon), and the eastern Kangra and Shimla divisions. In addition, while the Sikhs made up 35% of the province's population, the demographic pattern of urban and rural settlement was such that the Hindu population, whose majority status was new, was largely clustered in urban areas. The seven Sikh-majority districts would be the suggested basis of the Punjabi Suba, for which Tara Singh campaigned vigorously between late 1948 and early 1949.

On 30 May 1948, a delegate session of the Akali Dal meeting at Amritsar had passed a resolution rejecting the party's merger into the Congress, electing Tara Singh as president of the revived party. On 2 August 1948, at a press conference at Delhi, Tara Singh demanded the linguistic reorganisation of Punjab, for the creation of a Punjabi-speaking state. On 25 August, he announced that the goals of the movement would also include Sikh recruitment to the Indian Army, safeguarding Sikh rights and interests in PEPSU, Punjabi as the language of institutions and the medium of education, and the allotment of land and property to Partition refugees equivalent to what they possessed before.

==== PEPSU ====
PEPSU was formally inaugurated on 15 July 1948 by Sardar Patel, who in his address described PEPSU, with a strong Sikh majority, as a "homeland of the Sikhs". The interim government would be led by the Maharaja of Patiala, Yadvinder Singh, as rajpramukh, or appointed governor, and the Maharaja of Kapurthala Jagatjit Singh as deputy rajpramukh. A later 3-person caretaker government was formed with Gian Singh Rarewala as Premier, and Hindu ministers as Adviser (Sir Jai Lal) and Chief Secretary (B.R. Patel); this would be reworked following Akali protests for proportional administrative representation on 13 January 1949 with a ministry under Rarewala with 4 Sikh ministers and 3 Hindu ministers, sworn in on the 20th. However, it would be dissolved on 18 November that year when the Central Government took over administration, a move that was condemned by an Akali resolution on 28 November.

=== Constitution ===
The new platform of the Akali Dal mobilized strong support among Sikhs, and the Akali Dal passed a resolution in October 1948 in favor of continuing distinct representation of the Sikh minority through a Punjabi Suba, to protect against the aggressive communal mentality displayed by some in the majority if weightage or reservation for Sikhs in the Constituent Assembly was not possible, though a decision adopted by the Congress in its annual session held in December 1948 read, "We are clearly of the opinion that no question of rectification of the boundaries in Northern India should be raised at the present moment whatever the merits of such a proposal."

The Congress leadership, including Nehru and Gandhi, had passed a resolution in its December 1929 annual Lahore session, stating that no national constitution framed after the transfer of power would be passed unless acceptable to the Sikhs, and Congress leader had reiterated their promise to provide maximal provincial autonomy in the new country as the Akalis would vote for partition on 23 June 1947, confident that aspirations would be satisfied through "the goodwill of the Congress and the majority community," relinquishing their bargaining power to join the Indian Union in doing so. A July 1947 resolution for Partition that had been passed by Sikh and Hindu members of the Punjab Legislative Assembly stated that in the Indian portion of Punjab, "special constitutional measures are imperative to meet just aspirations and rights of the Sikhs."

Nehru had been quoted in the 9 January 1930 edition of the Lahore Bulletin during the freedom struggle, and as late as July 1946 at the All India Congress Committee in Calcutta, that "the brave Sikhs of Punjab are entitled to special considerations. I see nothing wrong in an area set up in the North of India wherein the Sikhs can also experience the glow of freedom," though afterwards telling the Sikhs after the British left that the "circumstances had now changed." He had also strongly rejected the formation of Punjabi-speaking areas into a separate state when Lord Mountbatten had forwarded the suggestion from Baldev Singh and Giani Kartar Singh to him just prior to the Partition and population transfer.

==== Rejection ====
The Minority Committee formed by the Punjab Chief Minister made the case to the Assembly three weeks after the Akali resolution's passing. The Assembly was against even proportional reservation as potentially yielding to the Sikhs more than their supposed fair share, even denying Sikh representatives of scheduled castes concessions given to Hindu scheduled castes, which would be rescinded upon converting out. In his autobiography, Tara Singh would write that when meeting with Nehru for equal concessions to scheduled castes, Nehru admitted that he was "helpless" before the communalism displayed by Parliament members. Tara Singh would also ascribe this to the domination of anti-Sikh communalists, particularly the Arya Samaj, in the "Punjab Congress, the Punjab press, the Punjab Legislative Assembly and all other spheres of political power," considering them to be "dup[ing]" Hindus outside Punjab.

Tara Singh himself was arrested on 20 February 1949 and imprisoned for several months, during which time the agitation was continued under the leadership of Sardar Hukam Singh, who in early 1950 described the demand for a Punjabi-speaking state as both secular and democratic. The Working Committee of the Akali Dal passed a resolution in May supporting a state based on Punjabi language and culture.

Sikh members of the Assembly would refuse to sign the draft constitution to be enacted on 26 January 1950. In addition, the Akali delegation maintained that the measure of provincial autonomy afforded in the document did not match prior assurances, and the demarcation of provinces in the North was specifically delayed to deprive Sikhs of a political foothold in their own homeland of Punjab. On these grounds, the two Akali delegates in the Constitutional Assembly, Hukam Singh and Bhupinder Singh Mann, did not sign the constitution in 1950, stating that "the Sikhs do not accept this constitution; the Sikhs reject this constitutional Act." Hukam Singh would state to the Assembly on 21 November 1949:

"...Their demands were very simple. They wanted a Punjabi speaking province. That has been denied. It was not a communal demand, but a territorial one. But the majority community in the province went so far as to disown their mother tongue. That language is in danger on account of aggressive communalism of the majority. Andhra Province is a settled fact; other cases are to be looked into; but North India cannot even be considered for it, The next was this consideration for services, that has also been denied....
"Naturally, under these circumstances, as I have stated, the Sikhs feel utterly disappointed and frustrated. They feel that they have been discriminated against. Let it not be misunderstood that the Sikh community has agreed to this constitution. I wish to record an emphatic protest here. My community cannot subscribe its assent to this historic document."

== Early efforts (1949-1955) ==
=== 1949 Sachar Formula ===
The Sachar Formula was introduced on 2 October 1949 under the government of Bhim Sen Sachar to forestall the growing agitation. Drafted by two Hindu members and two Sikh members of the Congress party, it proposed making Punjabi as the medium of instruction up to the matriculation stage in the "Punjabi zone" area, with Hindi taught as a compulsory subject from the end of the primary level onward, and vice versa for "Hindi zone" areas. The "Punjabi zone" consisted of Gurdaspur, Amritsar, Hoshiarpur, Jalandhar, Ferozpur, and Ludhiana districts, along with Hisar district north of the Ghaggar river, and the Ropar and Kharar tehsils of Ambala district. Its goal had been mutual bilingualism, but as it divided Punjab into Punjabi and Hindi zones, it had the effect of sharpening the divide between the majority Sikh north and majority Hindu south.

=== Opposition ===
==== Arya Samaj ====
The Arya Samaj led the forces of Hindu communalism against the Akali Dal. While earlier in June 1948, both Punjabi and Hindi were both made official media of educational instruction, the Municipal Committee of Jalandhar in February 1949 resolved to make Devanagari Hindi the sole media in its schools, and the Senate of Panjab University, then Punjab's only university, passed a resolution on 9 June refusing to use Punjabi in any script as a medium of instruction; both were strongholds of the Arya Samaj, which, supported by its Jan Sangh and Hindu Mahasabha allies, would never accept the formula or implement it in its schools. Home Minister Vallabhbhai Patel, writing to Nehru on 17 July 1949, bolstered the opposition by stating that Punjabi was not a language but a dialect, with no willingness on the part of the people to adopt it.

After failed efforts to absorb the Sikhs, and with the slogan of "Hindi, Hindu, Hindustan," Hindu organizations opted to spurn the language so that the Sikhs would be considered a linguistic minority as well as a religious minority, and thus prevent the formation of a state which would be Sikh-majority. To undercut the linguistic basis of the demand, the Arya Samaj embarked on a newspaper propaganda campaign to encourage the Hindus of even the Punjabi-speaking area to disown Punjabi entirely and select Hindi in censuses beginning in early 1951. Falsifications by census officials also led to clashes at several locations, prompting the Prime Minister to place a moratorium on linguistic data collection.

This repudiation of Punjabi would be repeated in the 1961 census ten years later, and half of the demographic would continue to select Hindi even after the movement in the 1971 census.

==== Hindu Mahasabha ====
The Hindu Mahasabha was against the division of Punjab as they viewed it as a Sikh attempt at political dominance and wished for Punjab to be a Hindi-dominant state.

==== Akali Dal ====
While many Akalis leaders were initially receptive to the formula, and Tara Singh was released at its introduction in the hopes that the formula would be accepted by the party, Tara Singh turned it down, reminding the Congress of its commitment to forming linguistic states, and that a Punjabi-speaking region had already been demarcated for the purposes of the Sachar Formula itself. The Akali Dal would hold its first major protest demonstration in August 1950.

In response to the Hindi opposition, the Akali Dal mobilized the Sikhs of the region. This competition led to several clashes in Punjab, and heated electoral campaigns by the Akali Dal and Congress through to 1952; Congress would go on to win the election, but by forming and leading a coalition called the United Front with other opposition parties, the Akali Dal would go on to form the first non-Congress government of India in PEPSU in April 1952. Before the United Front could elect a new leader after Gian Singh Rarewala, Congress would dissolve the Assembly under President's Rule, implementing changes in administration including the removal of the Sikh Chief Secretary and the two Sikh Deputy Commissioners, to avert any efforts toward a Punjabi state, opposed by Nehru

In August 1952, the Akali Dal would position itself as the premier representative for Sikh rights, broadcasting its victory in the subsequent annual elections and dislodging of the pro-Congress president of the Dal as a referendum for support for the Punjabi Suba among the Sikhs. The merging of PEPSU into the Punjabi-speaking region was also advocated in December by Tara Singh to further ensure Sikh territorial unity within the proposed Suba. The Akali Dal criticized Congress in its handling of PEPSU in relation to the designated Punjabi-speaking area, though the Congress announcement on 27 December 1953 of another States Reorganization Commission undercut accusations of division, and Congress retained control in the PEPSU elections in January 1954.

=== 1953 States Reorganisation Commission (SRC) ===
The SRC (1953–55) favoured Punjab remaining a bilinguial Punjabi and Hindi-speaking state. Though the calls for a Punjabi Suba were initially disregarded by the central government, the problem did not subside, and another States Reorganization Commission was set up in 1953. Stemming from new nationwide momentum for linguistic states, it was charged with "'investigat[ing] the conditions of the problem, the historical background, the existing situations and the bearing of all relevant important factors thereon."

Five days before the announcement, in the wake of President's Rule, during the mid-term polls of 1953, Nehru had come to campaign to a Sikh congregation at Fatehgarh Sahib on the occasion of Saka Sirhind; due to his firm opposition to the Punjabi Suba, he was prevented from using the observance to electioneer, with a group led by former MLA Atma Singh going on stage to prevent him from speaking. Considered a "national insult" by some Hindus, this would affect the composition of the SRC; while Punjabi statehood was the most controversial issue, no Sikhs were appointed for it.

The commission began its work in February 1954, and the Akali Dal submitted an 18-page memorandum on 14 May 1954, proposing the Punjabi Suba to include all of Punjab, PEPSU, and the Punjabi-speaking northern parts of Rajasthan, and to exclude the districts of Gurgaon and Rohtak, Panipat Tehsil in Karnal, and a few tehsils of Hisar district, which were to merge with Hindi-speaking regions. The Akalis drafted their case with care, strictly on the basis of language and using pre-1947 census figures, to present the proposed Punjabi-speaking state of an area over 35,000 square miles; they were supported in their effort by parties advocating rural interests, and complemented other linguistic state demands in the region. In a manifesto, the Akali Dal proposed that the establishment of a Punjabi state would enable education, administration, and cultural preservation in the language:

"The true test of democracy, in the opinion of the Shiromani Akali Dal, is that the minorities should feel that they are really free and equal partners in the destiny of their country…to bring home a sense of freedom to the Sikhs, it is vital that there should be a Punjabi speaking language and culture. This will not only be in fulfilment of the pre-partition Congress program and pledges, but also in entire conformity with the universally recognized principles governing formation of provinces…. The Shiromani Akali Dal has reason to believe that a Punjabi-speaking province may give the Sikhs the needful security. It believes in a Punjabi speaking province as an autonomous unit of India."

The Congress in Punjab, on the other hand, proposed the state integration of Punjab, PEPSU, and Himachal Pradesh, which was similar to the submitted memoranda of the Arya Samaj and the Jan Sangh, which had proposed the amalgamation of not only these territories but even Delhi as well, and had both insisted paradoxically that citizens of India could "choose" their mother-tongue.

This prompted the Akalis to organize a forceful agitation in response. According to Tara Singh, the script, language, culture, religion, and existence of the Sikhs were under zealous attack by Arya Samaji fanatical elements in order to wipe out their identity and thereby subsume them, and that the only safeguard against this was a state in which Sikhs held effective political power. Earlier Sikh movements had achieved, in large part, significant demarcation from the Hindus, preserving themselves as a distinct religious and political entity. The Punjabi Suba was also seen as a means to prevent Sikh religious apathy, and resultant backsliding into Hinduism, on the basis of shared religious postulates and cultural kinship, after considerable repudiation of traditional beliefs during the 19th century formation of Hindu identity by reformist neo-Hindus like the Arya Samaj, including the rejection of polytheism, idol and avatar worship, temple offerings, pilgrimages, the widow remarriage prohibition, child marriage, sati, and Brahmin priestcraft. Such repudiations had often converged with the earlier ones of Sikhism, though instead leading to competition between the two factions in Punjab and consequently North India.

The Akali Dal entered the 1955 Punjab SGPC elections on this platform and won resoundingly, winning all 110 seats it contested against the Punjab Congress, which had contested under the banner of the "Khalsa Dal," which had only won 3 out of 132 contested seats. The results proved a strong morale booster for the party, which had demonstrated strong Sikh support for its platform, and felt encouraged to start a movement for the Punjabi Suba. The opportunity presented itself when on 6 April 1955 the Punjab Congress banned the shouting of Punjabi Suba slogans; twenty days later the Akali Dal issued an ultimatum to rescind the ban by 10 May or face an agitation.

=== 1955 slogan agitation ===
Following the slogan ban imposed by the Deputy Commissioner of Amritsar, the Akalis commenced the Punjabi Suba slogan agitation of 1955. Large numbers of summoned volunteers congregated at the Darbar Sahib in Amritsar from demonstrations all over the province, thus reviving the protest methods of the Akali movement of the 1920s. The SGPC, which provided logistical and organizational support for Sikh politics, significantly bolstered the party's effectiveness.

The Congress government did not lift the slogan ban, and the agitation began as promised on 10 May, with Tara Singh and ten companions being arrested for shouting Punjabi Suba slogans, as were successive groups of Akalis as they embarked from the temple doing the same. In the next five days more than 1,000 prominent Akali leaders were arrested; in nearly two months, 12,000 Sikhs had been arrested for the Slogan Agitation, and by the end of July as many as 21,000 Akalis were jailed in Congress efforts to quash the growing movement, which nevertheless continued steadily. In several towns there were instances of Hindu communal organizations throwing stones and brickbats at Sikh processions. Thousands of volunteers were arrested for defying the ban on the slogan "Punjabi Suba Zindabad" ("long live Punjabi State"). Attempted negotiations with Congress led the agitation to be adjourned twice, though Jawaharlal Nehru continued to reject the demand.

==== 1955 Golden Temple raid ====
A flashpoint during the agitation occurred on 4 July 1955, when a group led by Fateh Singh, who had joined the movement, had arrived from Ganganagar a few days prior to take part in the protest movement. The police cordoned off the complex, with the entry of people into the complex and Amritsar was stopped.

At night, government police forces, led by DIG Ashwini Kumar, forced their entry into the temple premises and heavyhandedly took the entire group into custody, along with the head granthis of the Akal Takht and Golden Temple, volunteer protestors, and even cooks of the temple's langar. The Guru Ram Das Serai and Shiromani Akali Dal offices were also raided, and batons used and tear gas and shells fired to disperse the protestors gathered on the periphery of the temple, damaging the periphery and sarovar, or pool, of the temple. Supplies to the complex were cut off, all pilgrims staying at its rest houses were arrested, and Manji Sahib, where volunteers were sent daily to court arrest, was occupied. The government stopped volunteers on the way to the Golden Temple, and troops were ordered to flag-march through the bazaars and streets surrounding the site in a show of strength, though this would backfire as tension in the city increased, driving more volunteers to manage to reach the complex to keep the agitation going.

Thousands were arrested and injured. According to former Akal Takht jathedar Lakhbir Singh Rode, "fire was opened at Akal Takht and Golden Temple, and many Sikhs were killed". The Tribune newspaper would comment, "What overshadows the entire situation is that every weapon in the armoury of the Government has been brought into play. A great tragedy is being enacted in the Punjab.... The Punjab is facing the greatest crisis in its history."

Fateh Singh would later write,

"When I found that the Government would not allow even the shouting of the slogan Punjabi Suba, Zindabad!" I was greatly shocked. I thought: what sort of a free country was this? If I go about shouting Zindabad for my home, my street, my village, my province, my country, why should the Government lose its head over it? Can't I even praise my home or my area? Why can't a son of the soil honour the soil that gave him birth and nourished him ? […] In the early hours of July 4, the police swooped on us and took into custody anyone and everyone. Not even the cooks of the Guru Ka Langar (the holy kitchen) were spared. Our entire Jatha was taken to Ferozepur Jail. We were kept there for four months. Shri Bhim Sen Sachar, the then Chief Minister, apologised for July 4 incidents soon after, but the releases took a long time to materialise.[…] The Government, so eager to arrest me earlier, was now even more eager to get rid of me."

===== Fallout =====
The reaction from this event gave further momentum to the movement, opposite to the intention of the government, and proved to be so potentially destabilizing to the government, provoking disaffection among the Sikh masses and in the army, that on 12 July, the government under Sachar used the pretext of a "triumphal return from peace mission abroad" to lift the ban on Punjabi Suba slogans, appealing for peace. Sachar himself personal apologized at the Akal Takht. It also announced the release of Akali prisoners in installments, which proved slow to be implemented; Tara Singh was released on 8 September, and the last Akalis were not released until 18 October.

Sachar received heavy criticism from fellow Congress members for the apology and for not "taming" the Akalis; he would subsequently resign, succeeded by Pratap Singh Kairon in January 1956.

=== 1955 SRC verdict ===
The States Reorganization Committee submitted its report to the Government of India on 10 September 1955 where it was considered and published on 10 October.

In its 1955 report, the Commission admitted that the demand for a Punjabi-speaking state was analogous to the demand for other linguistic states, but rejected the demand even on its intrinsic merit. The Commission tried to turn down the demand for Punjab state being advanced based on the argument that the formation of linguistic-based provinces would spur other demands for the separation of other linguistic groups elsewhere; such claims had already been advanced by Sikhs, Jats, and other groups. The reasons cited in its report were that it did not recognize Punjabi as a distinct language, and that the movement lacked enough support amongst the Hindus of the proposed Punjabi-speaking state setting aside the criterion of language in favor of religious sentiments. For many, the former was a larger setback. Hukum Singh wrote, "while others got States for their languages, we lost even our language," seeing it as "another deadlier blow to the Sikhs." Giani Kartar Singh remarked that out of the 14 national languages of the Constitution, only Punjabi was left without a state.

With the language being distinct in grammar and lexicon, the Akali Dal regarded this reasoning as a pretext that amounted to religious discrimination, and that the demand would have been accepted without hesitation if the Sikhs were not set to be the majority. The commission also recommended the integration of Sikh-majority PEPSU, as well as Himachal Pradesh, with the Punjab, which was rejected by the Akali Dal a day after the report's release; a Commission member reportedly remarked that if the Hindi-speaking areas were removed from Punjab, it would yield a Sikh-majority area, prompting accusations of discrimination from the Akalis, who saw the verdict as another majoritarian maneuver to contain the Sikhs. Tara Singh regarded the verdict as a "decree of Sikh annihilation," believing that if there were no Sikhs, a Punjabi state would have been granted like other linguistic states had been. To him, its refusal was tantamount to religious discrimination.

Resolving to start a passive resistance movement, he took the opportunity to exhibit Sikh unity and resolution on this point, summoning a representative convention of Sikhs of all parties and organizations at Amritsar on 16 October 1955; nearly 1,300 invitees attended.

=== Amritsar Convention ===
The Amritsar convention strongly rejected the commission's proposal, castigating it for bias against Sikh claims, as the commission's recommendation was fully in accord with the most extreme elements opposing the Punjabi Suba, and even the Sachar Resolution, acknowledged as never even having been adhered to by those elements, was eroded.

The resolution of the Amritsar Convention stated in part, "this convention of the Sikhs view with alarm and great resentment the complete and callous resolution of the States Reorganisation Commission of the just and reasonable demand for a Punjabi-speaking state." The resolution called on the government to create the Punjabi Suba not only in the interest of the Sikhs but in the interest of the Hindi-speaking peoples of Punjab; Tara Singh received authorization from the Amritsar Convention "to take suitable steps to for conveying the views and sentiments of the Sikh community to Government of India and urging them to do their duty to the Sikhs;" his first action was to arrange a conciliatory meeting with the Prime Minister, Jawaharlal Nehru, who had previously been a strong advocate of linguistic states.

The meeting was facilitated by Baldev Singh, a former cabinet minister, who presented Nehru with correspondence between Sikh leaders and the Muslim League, reminding him that the Sikhs had rejected the League's overtures to side with India. Baldev Singh would act as a mediator between the Akali leaders and the government in their meetings.

== Compromises and countermovements (1956-1960) ==
The first meeting took place on 24 October 1955 in Delhi between the government, represented by Nehru and two of his senior cabinet colleagues, Maulana Abul Kalam Azad and Pandit Govind Ballabh Pant, and the Sikhs, represented by Master Tara Singh, who would present opening statements, Bhai Jodh Singh, also a member of the Chief Khalsa Diwan, who would explain the language problem, Giani Kartar Singh and Sardar Hukam Singh, who were to meet the political points, and Sardar Gian Singh Rarewala; a second meeting followed on 23 November the same year.

Following the 1955 Golden Temple raid, Sachar had faced heavy internal criticism for apologising to the Akalis instead of "taming" them; following his resignation, Partap Singh Kairon would succeed him in January 1956.

Further meetings were put on hold in December due to the announcement of a general session of the Congress Party to be held on 11 February 1956 in Amritsar; the Shiromani Akali Dal's announcement of its own parallel congress, the orderly five-hour-long procession of which dwarfed in size that of the Congress convention, provided another show of Sikh solidarity, with a large turnout of Sikhs from all over Punjab and beyond, with conservative estimates of over 100,000 marchers. Nehru biographer and contemporary observer Michael Brecher estimated the figure to be over double that, as many as half a million, with participants being old and young, men and women, with many of them wearing the traditional Akali symbols of the kirpan and the blue turban, and observed the processioners raising chants of "Punjabi Suba Zindabad" ("Long live a Punjabi State") and "Master Tara Singh Zindabad," with intermittent music. The success of the Akali march helped talks with the government to resume, after an invite from Nehru.

=== 1956 Regional Formula ===
Eventually both parties managed to break the impasse with a preliminary compromise, based on a proposal first made in January 1956 by Hukam Singh and reached on the 22nd: while stopping short of a Punjabi Suba, the state would be split into two regions in what would be called the Regional Formula: Punjabi and Hindi, with each region having its own committee consisting of its own share of Punjabi legislators, with powers to deliberate on all matters except law and order, finance, and taxation. The region would remain bilingual, but Punjabi in Gurmukhi would be the "regional" language, and the official language of the "Punjabi zone;" additionally, the Punjab Government would set up a separate department for the development of Punjabi alongside the one for Hindi, the central government would finally encourage Punjabi like any other regional language, and only PEPSU, and not Himachal Pradesh, would be merged with Punjab.

Talks again stalled by 26 February 1956 after the Sikh delegation perceived a lack of action during the meetings, but were resumed after Joginder Singh, a Sikh parliamentarian from Uttar Pradesh, persuaded the Sikhs to rejoin the talks.

==== Acceptance ====
The Regional Formula was put to a vote at a general meeting of the Shiromani Akali Dal at Amritsar on 11 March 1956. There were critical voices raised, on grounds of constitutional propriety as well as the perceived inadequacy of the measure, and Giani Kartar Singh conceded that what was offered was not the Punjabi Suba of their conception. Nevertheless, leaders including him, Jodh Singh, and Sardar Ajit Singh advocated acceptance of it as the starting point, or tentative promise, of a Punjabi Suba. The Sikh-majority PEPSU was also merged with Punjab for the arrangement as per the States Reorganization Commission's recommendation. Master Tara Singh, however, was apprehensive of accepting the measure, which would weaken the Akali negotiating position, though it would go into effect on 1 November 1956. In a resolution passed by the Akalis at their meeting of 30 September 1956:

“There was no doubt that the Formula fell short of the Sikh demand, but the Akali Dal accepted it in the larger interests of the country, in the hope that with goodwill and mutual accord, this might afford the protection that we had been asking for all these years."

On 23 September 1956 after approving the Regional Formula, the Akali Dal renounced its political programme, as part of its deal with Congress. Shifting its focus to the promotion of Sikh religious, educational, cultural, social and economic interests, and protecting Sikh fundamental rights, it was proposed that its large number of politically active members, including Giani Kartar Singh, be presented to Congress to further Akali political goals by joining and working through Congress. However, when the Congress assigned the Akali entrants 22 nominations for the Punjab Assembly and 3 for Parliament, Master Tara Singh, though now on good terms with Nehru, considered this as grossly inadequate, and considered the settlement void as far as he was concerned, though the Akali Dal continued to abide by it. Among the options left to him were to put up his own candidates against the Congress, which proved unsuccessful, and to politically reactivate the Shiromani Akali Dal, which he still controlled and set out to do.

==== Opposition to the Formula ====
While each regional committee, consisting of ministers and legislators, were to have special powers to advise the state government and assembly, this "unworkable" arrangement would collapse amidst conflicting interpretations of the extent of these powers, and mutual accusations of bad faith between the state government and the Akali Dal. As a result, it was never fully implemented by the state government.

Languages had been communalised far before independence, when Hindi was selected to be the symbol of Hindu nationalism, regardless of whose actual native language it was. The Arya Samaj had introduced Devanagari as the vehicle of Hindu education in Punjab in the late 19th century, along with an artificial, heavily Sanskritized Hindi "divested as far as possible" from the colloquial Punjabi of the masses. Hindi advocates would variably count non-Hindi languages as "dialects" to inflate the count of Hindi speakers as the national level, while trying to overpower such languages at the state level; the expansion and contraction of what was conveniently considered Hindi stemmed from its usage as a tool in political conflicts.

=== 1957 Hindi agitation ===
Hindi language supporters of Punjab, including Punjabi Hindus opposing the formation of a Sikh-majority state, resisted the Regional Formula. The Arya Samaj regarded the Regional Formula as worse than the Sachar Formula they had ignored earlier, and led the campaign to have it annulled, as the Punjabi-speaking "region" did not retain the Hindi option in the area for parents who wished to "choose" it as their language, which would have impinged on the unilingual character of the Punjabi Zone. Its leadership and that of the Jan Sangh formed the Hindi Raksha Samiti ("Save Hindi" Committee), supported by Arya Samaji newspaper editors, educational board members, and others, as the Arya Samaj controlled a large number of educational institutions.

External videos
- INDIA: Pro-Hindu Demonstrations (1957)

On 30 April 1957, Swami Atmanand Saraswati, the octogenarian leader of the agitation, launched it by sitting in indefinitely at the Secretariat at Chandigarh. According to him, the push to have Punjabi receive status in the Punjabi region was used to "gain political power," while Hindi was being "relegated to a secondary position," in an appeasing affront to what he called the "national language." Founded by the Jan Sangh for the purposes of the agitation, the Hindi Raksha Samiti's charter made five main demands:

- the medium of instruction in the educational institutions should be left entirely to the choice of the parents (the main demand);
- no compulsion to teach either language as a second language at any particular stage;
- Hindi should replace English at all levels of administration;
- official notifications up to the district level should be in both Devanagari and Gurmukhi; and
- there should be one language "formula" in the whole state of Punjab, as opposed to "Punjabi zone" and "Hindi zone" formulas.

The Government quickly conceded the demand for bilingual government notifications up to the district level to the Hindi movement. Such concessions to their communal demands compromised the strictly linguistic nature of the Regional Formula.

The Hindi agitation was opposed to the formation of either Punjabi or Hindi linguistic states carved out of Punjab. Far from any linguistic basis, the goal was specifically to create a greater Punjab in order to maintain a Hindu majority, and thus contain Sikh influence in the state's politics and assure Hindu dominance. The communal strategy also linked Hindi with Hindu demands, in order to draw support from other Hindu-oriented Hindi movements in other states.

The movement quickly spread all over the Hindi area of Punjab, with neighboring Hindi-speaking states sending large numbers of volunteers. About 30,000 participants took part against the Punjab Congress government, with 6,000 arrested by November for violating law and order.

Explicitly anti-Sikh language was used by the communalists. The Hindi Rakshi Samiti, while in Punjab, would launch anti-Punjabi slogans like langri bhasha nahin parhenge, gandi bhasha nahin parhenge, jabri bhasha nahin parhenge ("we won't study a crippled language, we won't study a dirty language, we won't study a language made obligatory"); at Ambala and Yamunanagar, Ura Aira nahin parhenge, gandi bhasha nahin parhenge ("we shall not read the script of (Punjabi,) a filthy language"); at Patiala by Swami Rameshwaranand, kainchi ustra karo tiar ("Ready the scissors and razors"); at Jagadhri, leader Sohan Lal Tiwari had uttered, "If the Sikhs wish to live here, they shall have to shave off and take Hindu appearance." Such behavior from the Hindi agitation until the end of the movement would leave lasting bitterness in Punjab.

During the course of the seven-month-long movement, several Sikh gurdwaras had been desecrated. Cigarette packets had been thrown into the pool of the Golden Temple in early July, and again on 24 December containing a poster threatening Sikhs, into a Patiala gurdwara in on 10 August, and into a Hisar gurdwara on 13 September. Pages of the Guru Granth Sahib were torn and strewn on a road in Amritsar on 1 August. The new Congress government, which had commenced on 3 April 1957 and was headed by Partap Singh Kairon as Chief Minister and former Akalis and current cabinet members Giani Kartar Singh and Gian Singh Rarewala who served under him, dealt with it harshly.

Nevertheless, the Hindi agitation provided Kairon with a pretext for delaying implementation of the Regional Formula, after which the Hindi agitation was withdrawn on 23 December 1957.

==== Akali response ====
The Akali Dal Working Committee, during its 8 September 1957 meeting, described the Hindi agitation as violent, vulgar, and abusive "hooliganism" rather than a satyagraha, noting that its leader had threatened marches on gurdwaras if Congress youth sat in on Arya Samaj temples, agitators had assaulted the persons of Sikhs, gurdwaras and Sikh scriptures had been desecrated, and that the central government had done nothing until "the Sikhs, giving up hopes of protection by the police and the Government, began to move and organise themselves for self-protection." Calling upon the government to stop yielding to and placating such hooliganism, he encouraged the Sikhs to stand firm.

Sikh sentiments remained hurt by the violent desecrations, the Sikh masses had not enthusiastically accepted the Regional Formula either, and though the post-independence intellectual and cultural context that had driven Punjabi advocacy and the initial drive toward the Formula did yield efforts for Punjabi University in 1956, the Formula was increasingly viewed as an inadequate solution to the Punjab problem, with neither the government or the political parties seeing potential in it.

The replacement of the Regional Formula became even more imperative for the central authorities with growing opposition to the usage of Punjabi and Gurmukhi among Punjabi Hindus even in the Punjabi zone, who "frequently" preferred Devanagari script alongside Hindi in place of what was regarded as an "arrogant" imposition. Many Sikhs would agree with Tara Singh's sentiments however, that a unilingual Punjabi state was just and justifiable on the same linguistic basis recognized in the formation of other states, and was not being done due to what the Akalis regarded as the central government's fundamental lack of trust in Sikhs. In a pamphlet, he expressed his view that:

"India claims to be a secular state. At present Hindus are in the majority in every state of the Union. The unilingual principle has been applied to all states except the Punjab. The Punjab is the only state where application of the unilingual principle may reduce Hindus to a minority community. If the principle is not made applicable in [the] case of Punjab, the unavoidable inference would be that this is done to see that Hindus do not lose their majority in any state."

An outcome of the Hindi agitation was the revival of the Punjabi Suba movement, amidst growing fears of Hindi and Hindu domination. While the Akali Dal supported the Formula until March 1958, Tara Singh stated in June that he would be compelled to restart the Punjabi Suba struggle if the Resolution was not implemented, holding a Punjabi Province conference in October. Language frontiers had become communal frontiers, and Master Tara Singh considered the Punjabi Suba as the only solution against rising Hindi fanaticism. He called a general meeting of the Shiromani Akali Dal at Patiala on 14 February 1959, which 299 out of 377 members attended. The convention strongly supported restoring the political operation of the Akali Dal.

==== Aftereffects ====
The movement's openly militant Hindu revivalist stance, its violent attitudes and methods, and heavy usage of Hindi speakers from outside Punjab as agitators was strongly criticized across the country. Observed by non-Hindi language movement leaders, one South Indian anti-Hindi leader remarked that all non-Hindi speakers ""should take a lesson from what is happening in Punjab;" there had also been a struggle for cultural preservation in Tamil Nadu against Hindi imposition that same year.

Even after their withdrawal, Hindi-language activists in Punjab and Hindu nationalist leaders outside the state remained committed to mobilizing their marshalled resources in future movements. The movement had served a range of political interests, including for Hindu Congress leaders despite the movement having been against their party, one had been the demand for 50% political appointment share from the Hindi areas, leading to inter-Congress factionalism; instead of making such demands from their party, this "Haryana faction" used the movement to "harass the [Congress] government" to avenge their defeat within their own party.

===== Haryana Lok Samiti =====
One such future outgrowth, the Haryana Lok Samiti, characterized the struggle as a "dharam yudh, a battle with Sikhs," and a "war between dharam and adharam (righteousness and unrighteousness), between Hindi and Punjabi, between Haryana and Sikhistan," refused to learn Gurmukhi as Hindi was "the national language," vowed to "fight against Sikhs" and "finish Sikhs from Punjab," described 1.5 million Sikh refugees as "thieves" and "worse than Muslims," boasted of their Arya Samaj affiliation, threatened "adharmi" Pratap Singh Kairon with assault even though he was also against a Punjabi Suba, and repeatedly chanted anti-Sikh and Hindu nationalist songs in Chandigarh meetings, which was "highly provocative and created bitter feelings among Sikhs." According to the 1962 Election Commission, the "real object" of the Arya Samaj leaders who were the chief organizers of the 1957 agitation had been to "promote feelings of enmity and hatred between the Sikhs and Hindus of Punjab on the grounds of religion and language," and then to exploit those divisions in future elections, as in 1962.

===== Golwalkar =====
Through 1960, in preparation for the 1961 linguistic census, the Jan Sangh and the Arya Pratinidhi Sabha continued to publish propaganda that again encouraged the state's Hindus to register their mother tongue as Hindi, as in 1951. These efforts were undercut by RSS chief M. S. Golwalkar, who in a meeting in Jalandhar, Punjab in 1960 declared that "Punjabi is the mother tongue of every Punjabi." Jan Sangh leadership would meet him in Ambala to urge him to amend of withdraw his statement, though he would not do so, which discouraged the delegation from pursuing another Hindi agitation with the same fervour.

During partition times, his fellow partisan V. N. Savarkar had supported the formation of "a Sikhistan in the Punjab."

===== Kairon =====
Partap Singh Kairon, though himself an advocate of the Punjabi language and the eventual 1962 founding of the Punjabi University for the support and development of the language along with Giani Kartar Singh, opposed the formation of either a Punjabi state or a Hindi state, like the Hindi agitation had. His own father Nihal Singh had been a prominent figure in the Singh Sabha enlightenment, the influence of which his own cultural perceptions and affiliations to Punjab and Sikhism had been moulded; he would refer to his proud Singh Sabha upbringing both privately and publicly. He pressed for the establishment of the university, though he repressed Akali influence in favour of bringing Congress influence into rural Punjab; politically active Akalis were still working through Congress per their earlier agreement during this time, joining during his leadership. Congress controlled 120 seats in the legislature out of 164, with 58 Sikhs among them, with nearly 50 representing the Punjabi "region," which had 71 seats total, though former Akali Sikhs were underrepresented compared to Congress Sikhs, and Tara Singh was not satisfied with the number of tickets given to former Akalis, regarding which he had not been consulted.

=== Goodwill Committee ===
Following the Hindi agitation, the Chief Minister appointed a Sidh Bhawna ("Goodwill") Committee, ostensibly for "promoting good relations between the communities," but rather taking upon itself the function of a language committee, centered on a single proposal for the language problem: making Punjabi digraphic with Gurmukhi and Devanagari, with its members specifically selected to support this foregone proposal.

While the Regional Formula had already delineated a Punjabi Zone with Gurmukhi as the language's exclusive and historical script, the new strategy sought to fundamentally change the language. The Sikhs saw no grounds for this committee, as per the Regional Formula, any change in the existing arrangements was to be made only with the consent of the concerned parties, and they saw the attempt to graft another script on Punjabi as an attack on their religious and cultural identity. Even Nehru pushed back on this, stating:

"A change in script is a very vital change for any language with a rich past, for the script is the most intimate part of its literature. Change the script and different word pictures arise, different sounds and different ideas. An almost insurmountable barrier is put up between the old and the new literature and the former becomes almost a foreign language that is dead. It would be a cruel vivisection to force such a change and it would retard the progress in popular education."

A subsequent 26-member Language Committee assembled by the state government in 1960 and espousing the same solution, was, like the "Sidh Bhawna" Committee, appointed under threats from Hindi agitators. Both committees were seen by the Sikhs as attempts to negate the Sachar and Regional Formulas that were earlier agreed to.

An SGPC resolution in March 1960 boycotted the Language Committee, stating that "the only solution of the linguistic trouble of Punjab is to bifurcate Punjab on the basis of Punjabi and Hindi."

== Renewed efforts (1960-61) ==
The Punjab Government under Kairon remained as politically firm dealing with rival supporters of Punjabi as it had done over the supporters of Hindi, and the political rivalry between Congress and the Akali Dal resulted in the narrow loss of Master Tara Singh in the election for the office of president of the SGPC to another Akali candidate, Prem Singh Lalpura. Tara Singh reacted by arranging a Punjabi Suba conference in Chandigarh, at which he announced his intention of launching a mass movement. He was subsequently arrested, though a silent procession in Delhi on 15 March 1959 proceeded as arranged; the procession, with portraits of Tara Singh, ended in a religious divan at Gurdwara Rakab Ganj Sahib, and Tara Singh was released from jail in under a week.

While in November 1958 Kairon narrowly dislodged Tara Singh from the SGPC presidency, his subsequent unconstitutional attempt to dilute the SGPC's democracy under the action of accommodating PEPSU representatives in the SGPC earned strong opposition from non-Congress Sikhs, which Tara Singh capitalized on by announcing another SGPC bid on the platform of the Punjabi Suba, securing the presidency and 132 out of 139 seats for the Akali Dal. The 1960 election was another contest between Kairon's Congress and Tara Singh's Akalis. Congress Sikhs worked to defeat the Akalis; Giani Kartar Singh even resigned from his ministry to focus solely on campaigning, and with help from the state government created the Sadh Sangat Board to contest the elections.

=== Reviving the movement ===
External videos
- INDIA: Sikhs Demonstrate for Separate State - Patiala. (1959)
- INDIA: DELHI: Sikhs Demonstrate for Punjabi-Language State (1960)
- INDIA: Sikhs Demonstrate in Delhi (1960)
- INDIA: Calm Returns after pro-Punjab Demonstration (1960)

Regardless, spurred by the electorate's sentiment against the conduct of the 1957 Hindi agitation, the Akalis under Tara Singh swept back into power in the 1960 SGPC elections. Taking 136 seats to the Sadh Sangat Board's four; following this, all the Akali members assembled at the Akal Takht on 24 January 1960 to pledge to resume the Punjabi Suba struggle. Following a 10 May announcement from Tara Singh echoing this, another Punjabi Suba convention was held on 22 May 1960, to which members of the Swatantra Party and Praja Socialist Party were invited. Presided over by Pandit Sundar Lal and former Congress member Saifuddin Kitchlew, the main resolution was moved by Sardar Gurnam Singh, calling upon the government "not to delay any more the inevitable formation" of a Punjabi-speaking state, especially when language-based states had been carved out in other parts of the country.

The attendance of Indian Muslim leaders from Delhi like Kitchlew led Darbara Singh, the President of the Punjab Pradesh Congress Committee, to characterize the convention on 9 October 1960 as a conspiracy between Tara Singh and Pakistan to create trouble in the state, wildly alleging that Tara Singh and Ayub Khan planned to have Akalis trained in guerilla warfare in Pakistan. After the convention ended, the government began arresting Akali leaders. Tara Singh was arrested and detained in jail under the 1950 Preventive Detention Act on the night of 24 May and detained in Kangra, and the government cracked down heavy-handedly on the Akalis, with large-scale arrests made throughout the Punjab, including many other Akali leaders and legislators, and lines of arrests at Amritsar, at which the Golden Temple was the main center of mobilization, and Delhi. About 500 preemptive arrests were made, though several top Akalis, including Fateh Singh, Harcharan Singh Hudiara, and Jiwan Singh Umranangal, managed to make it to Amritsar.

With the movement again gaining momentum, another march was announced to commence on 29 May 1960, going through the Punjabi countryside to end at Delhi to join a Sikh procession on 12 June 1960, stopping at important Gurdwaras to make speeches to rally support for the Punjabi Suba. Starting from the Akal Takht as scheduled, the 12 June procession was arrested a few miles from Amritsar. Daily processions of 11 Sikhs from Amritsar from 30 May onward marched to court arrest, and a procession was planned from Gurdwara Sis Ganj Sahib in Delhi.

The central government banned the procession on 9 June, sealing Delhi's borders to prevent their entry. A congregation of thousands of Delhi Sikhs at Gurdwara Sis Ganj was disrupted on 12 June by police, who used tear gas and batons in an attempt to disperse them. Nearly 18,000 Akalis courted arrest by July. Akali leaders made stirring speeches asserting the Sikhs’ right to self-determination, and the evening divans, or assemblies, at Manji Sahib attracted vast audiences. Nehru, recommending bilingualism for everyone in the province, continued to oppose its bifurcation, though Kairon would start to release some Akali protesters from jail to give the impression that they were easing their position. Four detainees would be killed in police fire while agitating for their release.

In its 21 July issue, the Statesman Calcutta warned, "Eighteen thousand people in jails means a big drain on the state's exchequer and a big loss of productive labour to the State's economy. Nor does it mean present loss alone. Throttling of popular sentiment may generate explosive heat, which once it bursts can lay waste whole tracts." According to a 22 July Times of India editorial, "The truth is that the situation in the State is far more serious than the government makes it out to be."

==== Press suppression ====
To suppress the spread of the movement, the government sealed and offices of two pro-Akali newspapers (the Punjabi-language Akali and the Urdu-language Parbhat) and detained their staff, though following objections of the All India Journalist Association against the curtailing of press freedom, were allowed to resume operation.

The government issued two measures to stifle the renascent movement: one banning newspapers from discussing Akali demands at the center of the movement, whether for or against them, and one setting heavy penalties against those evading arrest, or aiding or sheltering those who were.

==== Punjabi University granted ====
To undercut the agitation's popular support, the Punjab Congress Government granted two concessions: declaring Punjabi in the Gurmukhi script as the official language of Punjab at district level effective 2 October 1960, and the appointment of a commission, headed by the Maharaja of Patiala and several academics, for the establishment of Punjabi University. Punjab Ekta Samiti, a Hindu communalist organization, protested on 23 September against these ordinances.

==== Punjabi Suba Students Front ====
On 22 September 1960, Inderjeet Singh, a 10-year-old boy from Moga visiting relatives in Karnal, would be beaten with batons, killed, and thrown in an irrigation well by policemen for raising slogans. The Akali Dal held a day in his honor on 24 September, and the killing spurred the formation of the Punjabi Suba Students Front on 26 September.

=== Under Sant Fateh Singh ===
With Tara Singh in jail, his second-in-command Sant Fateh Singh directed the movement from the Golden Temple in his absence, assisted by the Sikh Students Federation in delivering speeches drawing from Sikh history to garner support, in 1960.

A religious leader without a long political background, having been brought into politics by Tara Singh, Fateh Singh was nevertheless an effective leader, and presented the demand for the Punjabi Suba as based on linguistic considerations alone, bringing it in line with the country's declared goals of democracy and secularism, and what was considered most important was the creation of a unit comprising all Punjabi-speaking areas, with Punjabi as the official language, over religious demography. He tactically stressed the linguistic basis of the demand, while downplaying its religious basis — a state where the distinct Sikh identity could be preserved, though, in regard to the additional significance of minority rights, stating, "No status is given to the Punjabi language, because Sikhs speak it. If non-Sikhs had owned Punjabi as their mother tongue, then the rulers of India would have seen no objection in establishing a Punjabi State."

As a Jat Sikh, he held a strong constituency among, and furthered the shift in political power to, the rural peasantry and the gurdwaras. Rural Jatt Sikhs had felt politically disenfranchised from Akali leadership positions under Tara Singh during the three decades prior, which had been dominated by urban non-Jatts, as did Sikhs from the Malwa region in relation to those of Majha, as well as local Sikhs in relation to Partition refugee Sikhs.

The government resorted to rigorous measures to put down the agitation, but volunteers continued to join and the movement continued, even as thousands of Sikhs were put in jail.

=== Bathinda Special Jail ===
As the rate of volunteers courting arrest increased, government agents began infiltrating the jails in order to spread disinformation, demoralize the volunteers, and offer releases in exchange for solicited unconditional apologies. Jail officials misrepresented thumb marks signing apologies as for the purposes of railway passes; upon discovery of this, Akali prisoners began demanding notes stipulating that their releases were unconditional. Along with subpar conditions in the overcrowded Bathinda Special Jail, tensions in the prison increased, and on 9 October 1960, the use of signatures for apologies misrepresented as rail passes again came to light, and Akali prisoners refused to exit. Police, surrounding the jail, fired into the Akali mob, killing 4 protesters (Jaswant Singh, Chanchal Singh, Nazar Singh, and Ranjt Singh) and injuring 150.

The next day, a procession of 250 Sikhs from Gurdwara Dukh Nivaran Sahib, Patiala, protesting the Bathinda firing were themselves fired upon, killing two more (Dewan Singh, Hari Singh). The incidents lent to denunciations from several political parties of the state government's tactics to suppress civil liberties, which threatened to worsen the political climate.

=== Fateh Singh's fast ===
As for the central government, Nehru forcefully reiterated his position against the Punjabi Suba in a Delhi press conference on 21 October; on 17 November, while giving a speech at an agricultural college opening ceremony in Nainital, Sikh protesters released slogans for Punjabi Suba, at which he angrily stated that the Punjabi Suba had been left in Pakistan and taunted, "go to your Punjabi Suba. Why are you here?"

This outburst would harm his image further among Sikh circles, including the executive committee of the Chief Khalsa Diwan which reiterated the constitutional right to advocate for a unilingual state within the country without being called unpatriotic, Hukam Singh of the Akali leadership who denounced him forcefully as a "Goebbelsian liar," and Fateh Singh, who on 29 October wrote that to Nehru that denying the Punjabi Suba closed all avenues for the legitimate demand, which left him no choice but to "resort to fast unto death to prick [his] conscience," to begin on 9:00 a.m. on 18 December.

External videos
- INDIA: Sikh's 'Fast to Death' Threat in Punjab Dispute. (1961)
- INDIA: Sikh Leader Ends "Fast to Death" After 47 Days. (1961)

On 29 October 1960, Fateh Singh wrote to Jawaharlal Nehru saying that if the Sikhs’ democratic and constitutional demand for a Punjabi-speaking area was not accepted, he would go on a fast (a novelty in Sikh tradition), seeking to impress upon him the Sikhs’ sense of grievance and the repressiveness of the Congress-run Punjab Government, and arguing that it was necessary to give his life to save the country from "dictatorial rule under the garb of democracy." Nehru did not intervene, and the fast commenced on 18 December 1960. Before entering his hut on the Golden Temple premises, he addressed a large gathering of Sikhs, instructing them to keep the movement peaceful, saying that damage to the country was damage to themselves. A roster of ten Sikhs was drafted to continue the movement in case Fateh Singh's fast ended in death.

Indian leaders of diverse opinion attempted to intervene to persuade Fateh Singh to abandon the fast, though he would not withdraw from his resolution. As national concern grew over Fateh Singh's life, as his possible death was feared to possibly lead to major Sikh estrangement from the government and further consequences, and more than 50,000 Sikhs had been jailed at this point, Nehru in a speech in Chandigarh on 20 December 1960 conceded that Punjabi was the dominant language of the Punjab and that it must be promoted in every way; this was repeated in a speech in Rajpura later in the day. On 23 December in a public address at Delhi, and again on 31 December, he made a personal appeal to Fateh Singh to stop the fast.

==== Tara Singh's release ====
Chief Minister Partap Singh Kairon, under the advice of his old teacher and informal counsel Jodh Singh, set Tara Singh free on 4 January 1961, ostensibly to consult Fateh Singh, but in the hopes of reducing the chances of agreement between him and Nehru. Along with this strategic timing by Congress, a section of Sikhs pressured Tara Singh to have the fast ended, believing that he had incentive to delay any rapprochement, to bring about Fateh Singh's death and consolidate his own leadership.

Similarly, some Sikh members of Congress were also under pressure; two Sikh MLAs resigned in solidarity with the fast, and former Defense Minister in the first Congress ministry, Baldev Singh, criticized the central government for backing out of their responsibility to implement the established compromise of the Regional Formula five years before, and that Tara Singh was being unfairly blamed now. Believing that the government was never sincere in implementing it then, at the state government's renewed "half-hearted" attempts to implement it after 35,000-40,000 arrests at that point and in light of Fateh Singh's potential death, he declared the Regional Formula "dead", and that "those very men who murdered the Regional Formula have now started shouting "Long Live Regional Formula".

Tara Singh immediately called on Fateh Singh, severely weakened from his fast, then arranged to meet Nehru while he was in Bhavnagar, Gujarat for the annual Congress session. On a specially chartered flight from Delhi to Bhavnagar, he was accompanied by Harbans Singh Gujral, Lachhman Singh Gill, Hargurnad Singh, Harcharan Singh of Bathinda, and Seth Ram Nath, one Punjabi Hindu who openly espoused the cause for a Punjabi-speaking state. While in flight the group held mutual consultations and reduced their minimal demand in writing.

On 7 January 1961, Tara Singh held a two-hour meeting with Nehru, without result. While Nehru considered the Punjabi Suba as a communal demand in the garb of linguistic reorganization, Tara Singh countered that it was the opposition to the linguistic demand that was in fact being made on a communal basis.

The next day, Nehru added a postscript to what he had told Tara Singh, that the formation of forming linguistic states had not halted due to any discrimination against Punjab or distrust of the Sikhs, and that "Punjab state is broadly speaking a Punjabi Suba with Punjabi as the dominant language," conveying consideration to making all of Punjab unilingual. He also expressed concern regarding Fateh Singh's health and wished to see his fast ended. While there was no indication of any change in the government's stance toward the Punjabi Suba, this reassured Tara Singh, who had a call made to Amritsar stating that the obligations of his vow had been fulfilled, and asking him to terminate his fast, a motion also adopted by the Working Committee of the Akali Dal, who on behalf of the Khalsa, told Fateh Singh that they were satisfied his pledge had been complied with and that he must end his fast.

==== Conclusion ====
Fateh Singh ended his 22-day fast with a glass of juice on 9 January 1961, marking the end of the seven-month-long morcha, or movement. According to official government figures, 30,000 Sikhs had been placed in jail over the course of the morcha which had taken place over the period of 1960–1961; they were released when Fateh Singh ended his fast.

Due to his role in having Fateh Singh's fast ended without its objectives fulfilled, Tara Singh began to attract criticism among the masses and his leadership among them began to be questioned; during speeches over the next few days he was heckled and interrupted by congregations at Gurdwara Manji Sahib.

=== Ascendance of Fateh Singh ===
Political negotiations resumed between the Akalis and the government, with three meetings between Fateh Singh and Nehru on 8 February 1961, 1 March 1961, and 12 May 1961. While cordial, they did not yield solid results; Nehru offered to extend protection to the Punjabi language and look into Sikh grievances, but continued to oppose Punjabi-speaking areas forming a separate state, which was not accepted by Sikhs.

Nehru had invited Fateh Singh for the 8 February talks; the pending creation of Nagaland for "the protection and preservation of Naga culture" had given Sikhs new hope for the acceptance of the Punjabi Suba on similar grounds. Nehru reiterated his suspicion that a Sikh-majority state was the objective, and that Hindus being a minority there would engender harmful anti-Sikh sentiment in other states. Fateh Singh replied that it was Nehru's responsibility to dispel, not encourage, those sentiments, to treat communities equally, and that as Sikhs were able to live safely in foreign countries, so they should be able to live in their own, demanding nothing but a unilingual state akin to others in the country. Nehru nevertheless continued to oppose the Punjabi Suba on religious demographic grounds in the following meetings. Gurbakhsh Singh, a deputy of Fateh Singh, stated that the maintenance of a Hindu majority could not be kept "as a hanging sword over the Punjabi language."

The talks would end in failure; referring to Tara Singh, Nehru had said on 1 March, "kya main taqat dushmanon ke haath men de dun?" ("How can I entrust power into the hands of the enemies?"). Tara Singh in return wrote a letter of protest to Nehru, stating that if he was the root of Nehru's suspicion and the main obstacle against the Punjabi Suba, he was willing to exile himself from public life and India itself if it meant the agreement to its formation.

==== Tara Singh's fast ====
External videos
- INDIA: Indian Sikh Leader Starts "Death" Fast. (1961)
- INDIA: Indian Sikh's "Fast Unto Death" (1961)
- Sikhs Watch Death Fast (1961)
- INDIA: India's Three Fasting Sikhs - A Progress Report (1961)
- India's Hunger Strikes - Singh Continues Fast (1961)
- INDIA: Tara Singh Fast: Doctors Concerned (1961)
- India: Efforts to break Tara Singh's fast unto death continue on 18th day (1961)

In addition to Nehru's own view on the matter, political pressure on him and false propaganda from other communities began to depict Akalis as foreign agents, which the Akalis took offense at. To impress this point, Tara Singh himself embarked on a fast on 15 August 1961, during which notable Sikh mediators like Maharaja Yadavinder Singh of Patiala, and Hardit Singh Malik kept in touch with Nehru and Home Minister Lal Bahadur Shastri on one hand and Akali leaders on the other.

Rejecting Nehru's 10 August appeal letter otherwise, Tara Singh's fast, meant to draw national and international attention to the cause, again led to the Punjab Congress government's suppression of pro-Akali newspapers (the Punjabi-language Jathedar and again Parbhat), the arrest of approximately 50 Akali leaders on 1 June, the withholding of funds to Khalsa College, Amritsar until its pro-Akali principal Dr. Harbans Singh was suspended in order to suppress student protests. Tara Singh has stated that the focus of the movement would shift from mass agitation to individual martyrdom; Harcharan Singh Hudiara declared that the deaths of Tara Singh and Fateh Singh would potentially prompt the Akali leadership to call for Punjab sovereignty.

Hardit Singh Malik had come to Amritsar as an emissary of Nehru, and Tara Singh ended his fast during his visit. Seeing this as a sign of an impending settlement between the Akalis and Congress, anti-Punjabi lobbies reacted strongly. Arya Samaj ideologue and news editor Lala Jagat Narain, who had resigned as minister in protest of the Regional Formula, warned on 6 October that "the Hindus of Punjab would never accept the settlement."

==== Tara Singh's censure ====
On 29 September, just before 30 September talks between Malik and Nehru implied compromise in the form of a commission, Nehru asked Tara Singh to end his fast, after the Akali Dal's Working Committee approved the compromise. The commission was announced on 31 October after Tara Singh's recovery and meeting with Nehru, though he and the Akali Dal would immediately take issue with the proposed appointees as neither being the ones proposed during the fast, nor politically neutral and unaligned with Nehru as promised. Malik would later disclose in a 26 August 1965 letter to the editor of the Hindustan Times that Nehru had backed out of the agreement.

Having broken the fast without concrete progress on the issue after 48 days on 1 October 1961, criticism among Sikhs and damage to his reputation among them continued to grow, as the pledge solemnized at the Akal Takht was perceived to have been broken without achieving the stated target, and was thus seen as violating a religious vow. The responsibility for having Fateh Singh's vow ended was also directed at Tara Singh.

External videos
- INDIA: Sikh Leader Cleans Shoes as Penance. (1961)

A committee of five Sikh religious notables (Panj Pyare council), including religious scholars, jathedars of Kesgarh Sahib and the Akal Takht, and the head granthi of the Darbar Sahib, were selected and authorized on 24 November 1961 to investigate and determine the circumstances leading to the ending of the fast and determine penalties. Five days later, they pronounced Tara Singh guilty of breaking his word and blemishing the Sikh tradition of religious steadfastness and sacrifice, and he was ordered to perform additional prayers for a month and clean the shoes of the sangat, or congregation, and the dishes of the langar, or open community kitchen, for five days. Fateh Singh was also to recite extra prayers and wash "langar" dishes for five days for his own fast ending, though it was recognized that his fast had ended at Tara Singh's request. Photographs of Tara Singh's service were circulated widely in newspapers and served to somewhat rehabilitate his popular image and he was forgiven by the council of five, though his political reputation never fully recovered, and he had begun to be rejected by crowds at divans as far back as when after Fateh Singh's fast had ended. As a result of developing differences over strategy and tactics among the Akali leadership, Fateh Singh would begin to eclipse him as the leader of the movement. By 1962, after a period of interparty schism, Fateh Singh would be elected president of the Akali Dal, and had the support of the majority faction, having formed a parallel Akali faction in 1963. Government media also presented Fateh Singh as the leader at the complete expense of Tara Singh, as a strategy to widen the divide.

Sikh votes, often divided among the Congress and Akali Dal, were consolidated for the Akalis in the 1962 elections; while Congress won with 90 out of 154 votes, Kairon only narrowly re-won his office, regarded by many as resulting from rigging. In the Punjabi-speaking region, over 70 percent of the over 2 million Sikh votes went for the Akalis, though while Tara Singh also won back his position on the SGPC, only 74 of the 160 voting members had voted, with the rest abstaining in protest due to the continued stigma of Tara Singh breaking his pledge, and he was condemned again in a July 1962 convention in Ludhiana; Fateh Singh would continue to lead the movement on a purely linguistic basis after Tara Singh was narrowly dislodged from his position in a no-confidence vote in October with 76 votes to 72, which created a brief rift among the Akalis when the Delhi Sikh Gurdwara Management Committee broke with the SPGC in Amritsar in support of Tara Singh; another attempt by Tara Singh to dislodge Fateh Singh from the SGPC with a no-confidence vote in June 1963 failed.

Sant Fateh Singh's style was seen as more tactful than Tara Singh's, attracting back followers disillusioned with Tara Singh's policies; in a letter to Nehru he maintained that "We want a linguistic and only linguistic unit, where Punjabi language and culture are prevalent," regardless of religious demographics. He would hold a large rally to this end on 22 July 1962 at Mullanpur, and the political sidelining of Tara Singh amongst the Akalis would be assisted by Kairon, the Punjab Congress, and Communists, in a bid to take over the SGPC. Tara Singh and supporters including SGPC president Kirpal Singh Chak Sherwala and Akali Dal General Secretary Atma Singh would again be arrested on 17 August, with more arrest of supporters on 2 September.

=== 1962 Das Commission ===
Meanwhile, following the pending settlement made up to that point, Nehru appointed a commission chaired by S. R. Das to address the question of Sikh grievances in December 1961. The Akali Dal did not agree with its composition or its scope, and did not present its case to it, though the commission carried on regardless, and rejected suggestions of anti-Sikh discrimination while denying the demand for a Punjabi-speaking state as a Sikh state.

It was boycotted by all Sikh organizations, except for a newly formed "Nationalist Sikhs" group, whose spokesman appeared at the behest of Kairon. Even he, however, would present instances of discrimination and those noted by others, including against the Punjabi language, the treatment of Sikh farmers in the Terai, and the lack of industrial development in Punjab. Characterizing the lack of a Punjabi Suba as discrimination against all Punjabis and not just Sikhs, he would assert that it was "a travesty of facts to suggest that no cases of discrimination had been listed in this memorandum."

The few recommendations that were fielded by the Das commission included those by Arya Samaj editor Virendra, on behalf of the Hindi Raksha Samiti, who denied Punjabi as the mother tongue of the state's Hindus, its separate status, and the legitimacy of Gurmukhi as anything more than a religious script, as well as that of Balraj Madhok of the Jan Sangh, who cited the Regional Formula and regional committees as the real sources of trouble to be scrapped, and also denied the legitimacy of Gurmukhi for Punjabi. Submitting its report in February 1962, which was accepted immediately by the central government in light of rapidly approaching elections, it relayed that the Regional Formula had been delayed but not blocked, and therefore no injustice had been done. It also deemed the Punjabi Suba as a continuation of Sikh demands for a state during Partition, and hence beyond the commission's scope.

== Progress (1962-1965) ==
=== 1962 wartime contributions ===
With border tensions with China flaring up in 1962, the Akalis announced the suspension of further agitation in support of the war effort. The Punjabi contribution in soldiers and materiel matched that of the rest of India put together.

In 1963, the Sikhs and the Punjab had contributed massive amounts of wealth to the war effort against China in 1962, with over 20 million rupees to the defense fund, including 50,000 rupees directly from Fateh Singh to Nehru on 7 February. On his 73rd birthday, Nehru was gifted 130 kilograms (287 lbs) of gold by the Punjab Government, of which half had come from the people of Amritsar, and which had been donated to the government by the people of Punjab in the form of ornaments, medals, and other items from personal collections. Some of the 12,000 gold coins collected dated back to the Sikh Empire. In total, 252 kilograms (556 lbs) of gold would be donated. Bhola Nath Mullick, Nehru's intelligence chief, had noted that Kairon had promised Nehru that the people of Punjab would support the war effort with 'gold and blood'. On 28 November, the National Defence Fund (NDF) reported that it had received 80,000,000 rupees from national donations, of which 46 per cent (37,000,000 rupees) had been contributed by the people of Punjab. The giving of the gold on Nehru's birthday, in an amount double his weight, was encouraged by the Akalis, who anti-Punjabi groups in Punjab had earlier attempted to portray as traitorous. The only region to give more in gold was Ganganagar district in Rajasthan, itself heavily populated with Sikh refugees from Partition.

Sikh soldiers took the brunt of Chinese reprisals, with Bhola Nath Mullik reporting, "The Chinese perpetrated untold cruelties on the brave wounded Sikhs. Many of them were tied and then dragged and their brains were battered." Upon hearing such accounts, various concessions for Sikhs were offered from Chief Ministers across the country, including that of Madhya Pradesh announcing Punjabi in Gurmukhi script as a secondary school subject in his state while visiting Punjab, and large land grants for Punjabi soldiers from the CMs of Rajasthan and Uttar Pradesh in their states following accounts from the North-East Frontier Agency and Ladakh.

On 24 December 1962, Sikh leaders met at Patiala, under the Maharaja of Patiala as the Chief Organizer, in order to continue national defense after the 1962 war, amidst a spate of anti-Sikh comments and incidents involving government officials through the following year.

Only following the change in Akali Dal leadership and the significant role of the Sikhs in the later Indo-Pakistani War of 1965, which generated strong support among the Sikh population, did the center begin to consider acceding to the long-standing Sikh demand.

==== Punjab Raksha Dal ====
During the 1962 war effort, Pratap Singh Kairon, who opposed the Punjabi Suba from the beginning, had undertaken efforts to raise a rural volunteer force called the Punjab Raksha Dal ("Punjab Protection Army") for further reinforcement and manpower, and enlisted an American firm towards the construction of an air suspension factory in Punjab. Arya Samajists would nevertheless decry these efforts as a "consolidation of Sikh strength" and a steps towards a power seizure, and under such characterizations Kairon was told by the central government to merge the Punjab Raksha Dal with the Home Guard; factory plans were cancelled.

=== Changes in leaderships (1964-1965) ===
External videos
- Anti-Nehru Feeling (1963)
- INDIA: Large-Scale Manhunt for Pratap Kairon's Assassins (1965)

Amidst lingering suspicions among Congressites, Partap Singh Kairon's administration had also been attracting corruption charges amidst ebbing support in 1963; he resigned on 14 June 1964, facing 33 charges compiled by Congress MLAs on 29 August 1963 and an enquiry on 22 October, with his detractors and opponents characterizing the American-educated Kairon's political tactics, resulting in charges of corruption and nepotism, as the "American technique." During his defense facing S. R. Das of the Das Commission, he reiterated his stance against the Punjabi Suba and on the national border. The leakage of Das' report would nevertheless prompt his preemptive resignation a week before its official release.

His legacy would include the founding of Punjabi University, helping Punjab's agricultural peasantry with farming loans and techniques, electric power, infrastructure to attempt to draw the Jatts and other agriculturalists away from the Akalis, and the beginnings of Punjab's Green Revolution, which would go on to have strong influence on Punjab's political course in the coming decades, though Akali disagreement with Congress also alienated Sikh peasantry from Congress.

Jawaharlal Nehru would die shortly before on 27 May 1964, also remaining an opponent of the Punjabi Suba.

In January 1965, a close associate of Fateh Singh, Sant Channan Singh, was elected SGPC president, further consolidating Fateh Singh's position when his faction defeated Tara Singh's with ninety seats to 45 in the SGPC on 18 January. With the parallel factions remaining divided, Tara Singh withdrawing from the scene for six months for contemplation amid dwindling political fortunes, though his supporters remained active. Tara Singh would retire to Salogra, a small village in Himachal Pradesh, to enable Fateh Singh to lead the movement freely.

=== 1965 Nalwa Conference ===
A subsequent spate of desecrations of Sikh scriptures in the following period led to another Sikh convention in Patiala on 29 April 1965. The Sikh Review Calcutta noted these and past incidents of forced shavings and police assaults on Sikhs, ongoing Arya Samaj newspaper attacks on Sikh gurus, and vandalisms and burnings of various gurdwaras, all without redress from state or central governments. Internationally, a Malaysian Sikh convention at Punjabi School Kuala Lumpur also noted the continued desecrations as "a result of pre-meditated conspiracy by the people who are out to injure the religious susceptibilities of the Sikhs in order to create disorder in the country by such provocations."

Following a conference in Ludhiana beginning in May 1965, attention to the Punjabi Suba, the shared objective of both factions of the Akali Dal, was renewed on 4 July. Named the Nalwa Conference after famed Sikh general Hari Singh Nalwa of the Sikh Empire, the main Conference resolution was drawn up by eminent Sikh scholar and intellectual Kapur Singh, and moved by Gurnam Singh, then leader of the opposition in the Punjab Legislative Assembly, and seconded by Giani Bhupinder Singh, then president of Tara Singh's faction of the Akali Dal. The resolution read as follows:

1. This Conference in commemoration of General Hari Singh Nalwa of historical fame reminds all concerned that the Sikh people are makers of history and are conscious of their political destiny in a free India.

2. This Conference recalls that the Sikh people agreed to merge in a common Indian nationality on the explicit understanding of being accorded a constitutional status of co-sharers in the Indian sovereignty along with the majority community, which solemn understanding now stands cynically repudiated by the present rulers of India. Further, the Sikh people have been systematically reduced to a sub-political status in their homeland, the Punjab, and to an insignificant position, in their mother-land India. The Sikhs are in a position to establish before an impartial International Tribunal, uninfluenced by the present Indian rulers that the laws, the judicial processes and the executive actions of the union of India are consistently and heavily weighed against the Sikhs and are administered with bandaged eyes against Sikh citizens.

3. This Conference, therefore, resolves, after careful thought and consideration that there is no alternative for the Sikhs in the interests of their self preservation but to frame their political demand for securing a self-determined political status within the Republic of the Union of India.

— Moved by: Sardar Gurnam Singh,
Bar-at-law, Judge, High Court (Retd.)
M.L.A. (Punjab), Leader of the Opposition,

A similar statement of support was issued by the Chief Khalsa Diwan. While the demand of the Nalwa Conference had been for a self-determined status within the Union, the Hindi and Urdu presses interpreted this as a call for a sovereign Sikh state.

Later in an agreement in October 1968, a resolution which would reflect the ideas of Kapur Singh, who would become the senior vice president of the Akali Dal in 1969, would state that the Khalsa was "a sovereign people by birthright," the command of Guru Gobind Singh, and by the course of Sikh history, advocating for autonomous status in a demarcated territory within India, and that the national Constitution "should be on a correct federal basis and that the states should have greater autonomy," referring to the powers of all states of the country. This had been "the Congress party in power has abused the Constitution to the detriment of the non-Congress Governments, and uses its power for its party interest."

=== Tara Singh's return ===
On 24 July 1965, Tara Singh ended his self-exile from politics. On 2 August, he addressed a press conference in Delhi, applauded and pledged support for the Nalwa Conference resolution, calling for the Sikhs' "place in the sun of free India" in a statement. He further stated that:

- promises regarding self-determined Sikh political status were cynically repudiated soon after Independence,
- A "resurgence of militant Hinduism [had] since 1947 completely taken control of the scene in free India," characterized by "an emphasis on ramming Sanskritised Hindi down the unwilling throats of non-Hindi speaking people, insistence on the performance of Hindu rituals at State functions" to the complete exclusion of minority ceremonies, towards whom "an aggressive attitude" was directed, including various anti-Muslim riots and "persistent and planned desecration of Sikh places of worship" by "communalist thugs", "discontent in the Hill areas of Assam and Nagaland" due to "unfair treatment of Christians", and the continuous stifling of Kashmiri aspirations, with their leaders placed under detention, "all while proselytising activities of the Hindus have been encouraged by the State", and that it was "clear that the minorities in India, in particular the Muslims, the Christians and the Sikhs, stand in great jeopardy"; and
- that "the Sikh people are makers of history, and the community's identity cannot be wiped out in the name of national unity" by "these new rulers of India" seeking to destroy or absorb it.

In response, the government would again try to boost Fateh Singh's profile in relation to Tara Singh's, following reaction and criticism to his statement among some Hindus characterizing it as treasonous. The new Prime Minister Lal Bahadur Shastri invited Fateh Singh to talks on 7 August, though Fateh Singh would also reiterate the demand for a Punjabi Suba in the wake of continued government indifference to desecrations of Sikh scriptures and disregard of Akali and Sikh contributions to national defense. On 14 August, his Akali faction's Working Committee passed a resolution stating that "the Government of India did not trust the Punjabis in general and the Sikhs in particular."

In a 10 August address speech, Fateh Singh eulogized Inderjit Singh, the Bathinda Special Jail deaths, and the scores of martyrs for the cause. He announced on 16 August that in order to secure the Punjabi Suba he would commence another fast on 10 September, and if it was unsuccessful, on the 25th he would self-immolate at the Akal Takht.

SGPC president Channan Singh, Gurcharan Singh Tohra, and Akali Dal vice president Harcharan Singh Hudiara went to Delhi on 8 September to attend a high-level meeting with prominent government leaders, including the Maharaja of Patiala Yadavinder Singh, the Defense Minister, The Minister of State for Home Affairs, and members of Parliament.

=== 1965 war ===
External videos
- INDIA: Amritsar Homes After Pakistani Bombing Raid -- 54 Dead. (1965)
- PAKISTAN: Captured Indian Sikh Troops Held in Fortress (1965)

Requesting Fateh Singh to defer the fast in light of the declaration of the Indo-Pakistani War of 1965; some, including Yadavinder Singh, gave their assurance of support for the Punjabi Suba cause if the government continued to avoid the demand after normalcy was restored. This message was relayed to Fateh Singh on 9 September as Channan Singh and the Akali leaders returned to Amritsar. Fateh Singh accepted the request and appealed to the Sikhs in Punjab to support the war effort and the senior commanders, who were almost all Sikh. Pakistani radio would offer support to Fateh Singh and the Sikh soldiery and peasantry if Sikh nationhood was opted for, deploying paratroopers to aid expected widespread revolt, which never materialized and was strongly rejected. Tara Singh stated, "We shall, of course, struggle and gain our freedom by our sacrifices and by the grace of our Great Guru, but shall never ask for support from Pakistan. Such a suicidal step can only help us in jumping from frying pan into fire," and Fateh Singh offered blood, "as much as can be taken leaving a bare minimum for me to exist or for self immolation for the Punjabi Suba." The SGPC directed all 700 gurdwaras under its control to provide all aid to soldiers and their families.

The war ended 21 days later with a ceasefire on 22 September, with both sides claiming victory. More demonstrations of patriotism prompted the Indian government, who after Nehru's death in 1964 had leadership that was more open to consider regional demands, to revisit the Punjabi Suba issue in light of the contributions in the war effort by Sikhs. The Sikhs had previously been seen with mistrust and apprehension by the government; retaining the loyalty of the Sikh citizenry and soldiery, amidst fears of increased receptivity resulting from disaffection to Pakistani overtures attempting to soften historical Sikh-Muslim enmity, "probably also played a role" in this decision. Stories of the bravery and patriotism of the Sikhs during the war had already been circulating, and on 6 September the Union Home Minister, Gulzarilal Nanda, had made a statement in the Lok Sabha that "the whole question of formation of Punjabi-speaking state could be examined afresh with an open mind." Later on the 23rd he declared the formation of a committee of the Cabinet to pursue the matter further, with the stated hope that "the efforts of this Cabinet Committee and of the Parliamentary Committee will lead to a satisfactory settlement of the question." The Punjab Congress Committee also debated the issue at length, with Zail Singh, General Mohan Singh, and Narain Singh Shahbazpuri lending their full support.

== Formation (1966) ==
In the Parliament, the Home Minister sent a list of nominees from the Rajya Sabha to the chairman and a list of nominees from the Lok Sabha to the Speaker, Sardar Hukam Singh, who announced the final 22-person committee representing all sections of the House, including representatives from the Akali Dal, Congress, Jana Sangh, Swatantra Party, Communists, and independents.

=== Parliamentary Consultative Committee ===
External videos
- INDIA: Two New Indian States Formed - Common Capital is Chandigarh (1966)

The period for receiving memoranda from the various parties and individuals was set from October to 5 November 1965. Preliminary discussions were held from 26 November to 25 December 1965. On 10 January 1966, the SGPC's general secretary Lachhman Singh Gill and executive member Rawel Singh met the committee and presented the case for a Punjabi-speaking state. On the 27th, Giani Kartar Singh and Harcharan Singh Brar appeared in the Punjab legislature on behalf of Congress, also arguing in favor of it. Of the memoranda submitted to the committee, nearly 2,200 supported the Punjabi Suba and 903 opposing. Hukam Singh was thus able to secure string support from the assembled committee for its creation. Morarji Desai, Ram Subhag Singh and Biju Patnaik were among those who voted against the resolution.

Amidst perceived attempts by Nanda and Indira Gandhi to limit the committee's purview, the Sikh Review Calcutta reiterated the constitutional and linguistic grounds for the Punjabi Suba; a memorandum submitted by Buta Singh on 5 November blamed "Hindu communalists and their hirelings" for creating the problem by renouncing Punjabi for Hindi, and Tara Singh reiterated the Sikh right to "demand a self-determined political status for themselves within the Republic of the Union of India such as might enable them to preserve themselves and prosper freely."

The Parliamentary Committee's report was handed in on 15 March 1966; the Congress Working Committee had already adopted a motion on the 6th recommending the government to carve out a Punjabi-speaking state out of the erstwhile Punjab state. The report was made public on 18 March, and the demand was conceded on 23 April, with a commission appointed on 17 April to demarcate the new states of Punjab and Haryana, and transferring certain areas to Himachal Pradesh. The Punjab Reorganisation Act, 1966 was passed on 18 September in the Lok Sabha, and on 1 November 1966, a Punjabi-speaking state became a reality.

In total, 57,129 Sikhs would be placed in jail over the course of the movement.

==== Jan Sangh agitation ====
External videos
- INDIA: Hindu Leader Prepares to Fast Unto Death in Protest Against Formation of Punjabi-Speaking State (1966)
- INDIA: Leaders Fast as Conflict Continues Over Plans to Create Sikh State (1966)
- INDIA: Six Killed and Hundred Injured in Riots Over Future of Punjab State (1966)
- INDIA: Aftermath of Rioting in Northern Punjab - Curfew, Damaged Property, and Cremations (1966)
- Hindus And Sikhs Riot: New Delhi, India (1966)

In reaction to the committee's recommendation to the central government of a state with Punjabi as its official language on 9 March 1966, the Jan Sangh started an agitation, which would include strikes, arson, murders, and clashes, which would occur in Punjab and Delhi, in an attempt to maintain Hindi dominance

As Yagya Dutt Sharma, the Jan Sangh's Punjab secretary, announced a counter-fast, during which he would consist on "holy Ganges water mixed with salt and lime juice" before a gathering of 15,000 in Amritsar, mobs of thousands of Hindi supporters would take to the streets, amidst chants of Punjabi Suba murdabad ("death to the state of Punjab") and Indira Gandhi murdabad ("death to Indira Gandhi"). In Punjab, the mobs attacked government property and set fire to Sikh shops. In Panipat, 3 Congress workers, including an old associate of Bhagat Singh, would be burned alive when Hindu rioters set fire to the cycle shop in which they were trapped.

In Amritsar, violence began on the afternoon of 14 March, when Hindu students attacked the Katra Sher Singh post office, and protested violently in Bombaywala Khu. The police opened fire at both places. In the Ludhiana suburb of Iqbal Ganj, a group attempted to set fire to the records and furniture in the post office, leading to a three-hour incident in which at least six were reported injured. A 15-minute armed battle between Jan Sangh members and Sikhs also took place in Ludhiana, with unknown casualties. Troops were summoned to quell the violence.

In New Delhi, rioting began when Hindu nationalists attacked bearded Sikhs in response to the government decision. Sikh guards of Gurdwara Sis Ganj Sahib, the main Sikh gurdwara in Delhi, would defend the site from attacks by stones and bricks by rioters for three hours. They "impassively shrugged off insults and ducked stones until the harassment by a mob of 2,000 Hindus became unbearable," after which they would charge the mob with war cries and drawn swords in defense. Over 100 were injured in the clash, There were also widespread attacks on post offices, railway booking offices and other government installations in Delhi, prompting a dusk-to-dawn curfew in New Delhi.

Disturbances were also reported in Jalandhar and Patiala as well as Bhiwani, where troops fired on the mobs, killing one and injuring ten. By 14 March, Punjab Chief Minister Ram Kishan reported 45 demonstrators and 91 policemen injured in clashes, and that 235 persons had been arrested in Amritsar, Ludhiana, Jalandhar and Hisar.

The violent agitation was withdrawn on 18 March. Drawing widespread condemnation, and with 200 total casualties, it failed to receive popular support. Sharma would end his fast on 21 March after 13 days, following a statement which cited assurances from Indira Gandhi, issued by Atal Bihari Vajpayee, who also dissented on the formation of the Punjabi Suba. From its origin in Amritsar to its spread to Delhi, the agitation would claim fourteen lives.

===== Aftermath =====
After the Punjabi Suba was formed, the Jan Sangh pursued no further efforts. Its units throughout Punjab, Haryana, and Chandigarh would echo local sentiments on the burgeoning controversy of Chandigarh's status. It accepted Punjabi as the sole official language of the state in Punjab, displeasing many in the Arya Samaj, and facing "bitter attacks" from the Arya Pratinidhi Sabha for "betrayal of cause of Hindi" after the Punjabi Suba was formed, despite Hindi retaining compulsory status in schools.

Decades later, on 10 May 2015, commenting on the role that the Jan Sangh, the predecessor of the BJP, played in the 1961 census alongside the Arya Samaj and senior Congress leaders, Punjab BJP president Kamal Sharma would remark that "mistakes were committed," as the Jan Sangh had broken even from the RSS on the issue of the language Hindus were encouraged to register as their native language.

== Implementation ==
The Akali Dal took issue with the conceived form of the state of Punjab as presented, the form in which it continues to exist currently. Akali Dal opposed the implementation of the Punjab Reorganisation Act on 1 November 1966 and Akali leaders protested against it. Several months before its inauguration, Fateh Singh expressed his dissatisfaction over several issues of contention, including genuinely Punjabi-speaking areas being left out of the new state and given to Haryana and Himachal Pradesh, namely adjoining areas of Ambala, Kalka, Pinjore, Chandigarh, Karnal, Una, Dalhousie, and parts of Ganganagar district, as well as Sirsa, parts of Nalagarh, Tohana and Guhla, Ratia block in Hisar, and Shahbad block in Kurukshetra. (as a result of the falsified linguistic returns of the 1961 census), Chandigarh was being turned into a Union Territory, the level of autonomy of the states, and power and irrigation projects were to be taken over by the central government, instead of the state retaining control of them.

Over the use of the 1961 census, Tara Singh boycotted the commission, Fateh Singh's Akali faction passed a resolution stating that it had been done on religious and not linguistic lines, and the Chief Khalsa Diwan issued a press note:

"The 1961 and 1951 census recordings were on communal lines and did not convey the real number of Punjabi and Hindi speaking people....For this reason soon after the 1961 census, the then Prime Minister condemned its language recordings as "false and unreliable." What an irony of facts that in the terms of reference the present Home Minister should ask the Commission to give due regard to these figures."

=== Chandigarh ===
The trifurcation was to done by tehsil, rather than village, and would further skew the process. Two Commission members had proposed the exclusion of Kharar tehsil from Punjab, which, while unimplemented, had been the first sign that the adjacent Chandigarh was potentially not to go to Punjab state. The third member of the commission, Subimal Dutt, in his dissent noted that Kharar's rural population was majority Punjabi speaking, and that "the Hindu population in Chandigarh Capital project is purely migratory, having come from Uttar Pradesh and Rajasthan for labour only. Therefore, Kharar tehsil and Chandigarh cannot be considered to be Hindi-speaking."

Chandigarh had been the planned capital of Punjab, built to replace Lahore, the capital of erstwhile Punjab and of the Sikh Empire, which became part of Pakistan during the partition. Over 50 Puadhi-speaking Punjabi villages had been displaced to build the city, whose inhabitants remained marginalized.

Chandigarh was claimed by both Haryana and Punjab. Pending resolution of the dispute, it was declared as a separate Union Territory which would serve as the capital of both the states, while Haryana would ostensibly set up its own capital city. Though the Union Government had decided to give Chandigarh to Punjab as solely its capital in 1970, per a formal communication issued by the Union government on 29 January 1970, and Haryana was granted five years and a proposed budget of 200 million rupees to set up its own capital, this has not been implemented, though Chandigarh had been conceived to be the capital of a single state. However, the 1970 decision to be implemented in 1975 was then made contingent on the transfer of territory in Fazilka to Haryana, to be made accessible through a corridor, and the process again stalled.

The provision that Chandigarh's civil employees would be drawn in a proportion of 60:40 from Punjab and Haryana respectively has gone unheeded, with the proportion of employees drawn from Punjab having plummeted. The city has instead created its own body of civil employees drawn from outside the state. The Punjabi language has no official status in the city despite its creation in Puadhi Punjabi-speaking territory and its dominant Punjabi presence. As it remains a Union territory, the central government remains in control of its entire executive process.

=== Black Day ===
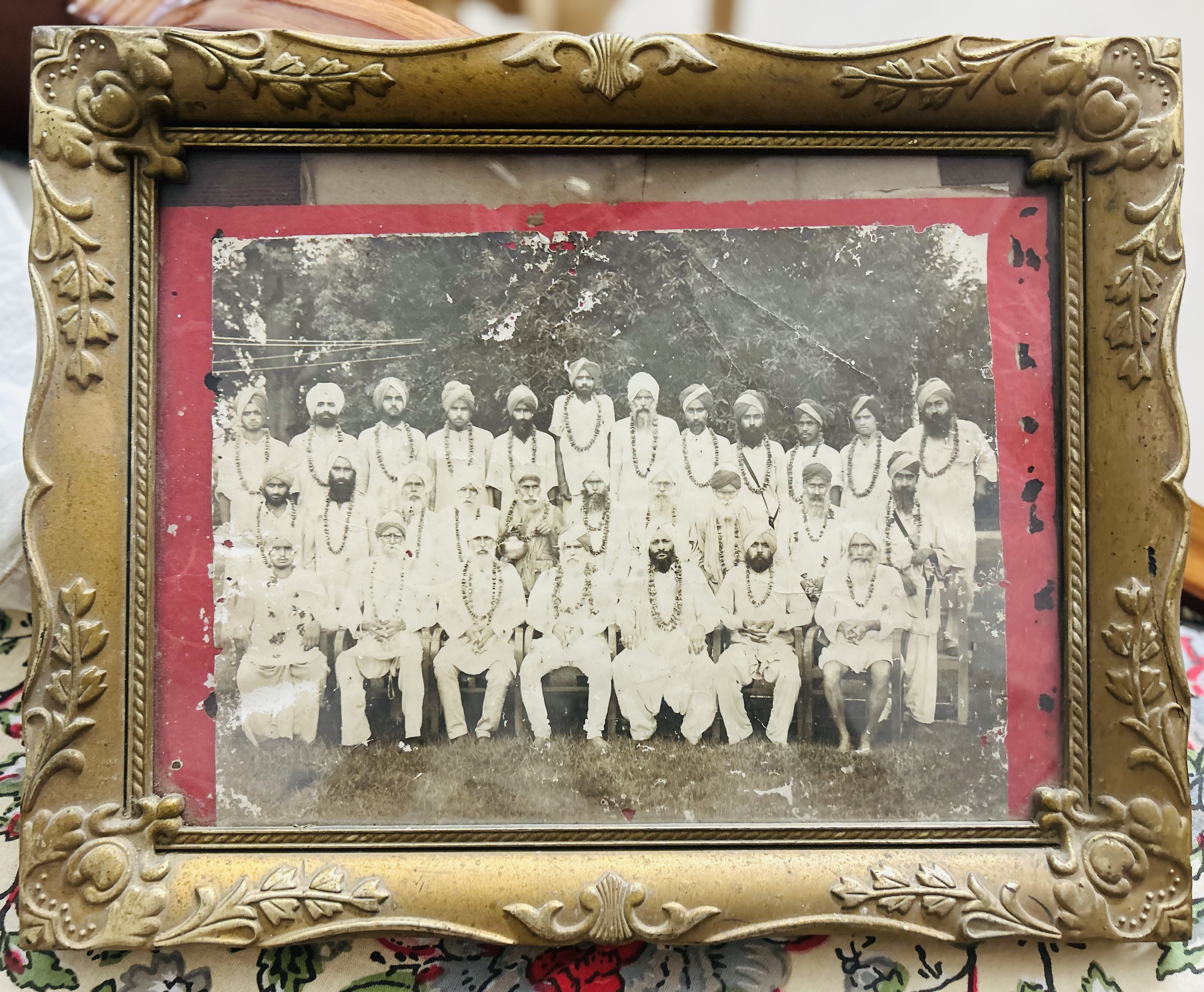
Photograph of a jatha of Sikh volunteers of the Punjabi Suba movement

External videos
- INDIA: Fasting Sikh Leader Reaffirms Promise to Burn Himself to Death in Amritsar (1966)
- INDIA: Sikh Leader Continues Fast - He Plans Self Immolation Tomorrow (1966)
- INDIA: Sikhs Wait in Amritsar for Self-Immolation Shortly Before Agreement; Sikhs Arrested in Delhi (1966)
- INDIA: Crisis Ends in Amritsar as Fasting Sikhs Call Off Self-Immolation Threat (1966)

A week after the implementation, Fateh Singh called for the continuation of the agitation, in order to have Chandigarh and adjoining Punjabi-speaking areas left in Haryana, as well as the control of the Bhakra Nangal Dam and other hydropower projects and headworks, returned to Punjab. Commencing on 16 November 1966, he began to send jathas of Akali leaders to the Punjabi countryside to rally support. 12 December was observed as a "Black Day." The next day, Fateh Singh started his fast at the Akal Takht, announced that he would commit self-immolation on 27 December. The Union government was concerned at this announcement and continued negotiations on the demands. An hour before the scheduled time of 4 pm on 27 December for immolation, after Hukam Singh arrived in Amritsar and told a large congregation at the Golden Temple that Indira Gandhi, who had assumed power on 20 January 1966, had agreed to arbitrate on the outstanding issues and that Chandigarh belonged to Punjab, Fateh Singh called off his immolation bid under this understanding, though she would state on 8 January 1967 that no assurances had been made on Chandigarh, and talks were unsuccessful. He would fast again before the 1970 decision. He would continue to demand the inclusion of Chandigarh and other Punjabi-speaking areas left out of Punjab until his death in 1972.

=== Darshan Singh Pheruman ===
The demand was additionally advanced by jathedar Darshan Singh Pheruman, a veteran Akali leader with a long history of participating in Sikh political rights movements, from the Akali movement during which he was jailed for a year in 1921 and the Jaito Morcha of 1923–25 to reinstate Sikh leaders of Punjabi princely states removed by the British in which he was jailed again three years later. He went to the jail three times during the course of the Punjabi Suba movement. Believing that Sant Fateh Singh had reneged on his (ardas) before completing his objective of the return of Chandigarh and Punjabi-speaking areas by not following through on his vow of self-immolation, on 1 August, Pheruman announced his own fast to begin on 15 August 1969.

Declaring the country as free but the panth still in bondage without a Sikh homeland, the party's Working Committee resolved to continue to struggle for the objectives of Fateh Singh's fast, with nearly all Punjabi parties participating in a huge procession in Chandigarh to have it included. Pheruman was arrested and sent to jail, where he continued his fast-unto-death. He died on 27 October 1969, on the 74th day of his hunger strike.

=== Unresolved issues ===
Despite the success of the movement in the creation of the state of Punjab, its implementation left many unresolved issues behind, including the allocation of the capital city of Chandigarh, which is the only state capital in the country to be shared with another state, adjustment of some of the territorial claims of Punjab, with many large Punjabi-speaking areas left out of the allocated state, and the distribution of river waters which remains unresolved. The national government's centralizing impulses, as manifest in issues like wheat procurement, water resources, and power resources, generated further Sikh disaffection, strengthening the belief that New Delhi was trying to impose a "political brake" on the community's economic and social advancement. This unresolved tension would lead to campaigns for more state autonomy throughout the 1970s. To this end, the Akali Dal would draft the Anandpur Sahib Resolution in the 1970s, and re-launch the movement in the form of the Dharam Yudh Morcha in 1982; by 1983 more than 40,000 Akali protestors had courted arrest, with thousands remaining in jail for months, and some for years. The Khalistan movement, which gained traction in the subsequent decades, would also stress the right of control over territory and water. These issues continue to figure prominently in Punjab politics and remain points of contention between the state and the central government.

== Bibliography ==
- Bal, Sarjit Singh (1985). "Punjab After Independence (1947-1956)". Proceedings of the Indian History Congress. 46: 416–430. JSTOR 44141382. PMID 22491937.
- Doad, Karnail Singh (1997). Siṅgh, Harbans (ed.). Punjabi Sūbā Movement (3rd ed.). Patiala, Punjab, India: Punjab University, Patiala, 2011. pp. 391-404. ISBN 9788173803499.
- Deol, Harnik (2000). Religion and Nationalism in India: The Case of the Punjab (Routledge Studies in the Modern History of Asia) (1st ed.). New York City, U.S.A.: Routledge. pp. 92–101. ISBN 978-0415201087.
- Grewal, J. S. (1998). The Sikhs of the Punjab (The New Cambridge History of India II.3) (Revised ed.). Cambridge, United Kingdom: Cambridge University Press. pp. 181–209. ISBN 9781316025338.
- Singh, Gurmit (1989). History of Sikh Struggles, Volume I (1946-1966). Atlantic Publishers & Distributors. pp. 79–176. ISBN 9780836458893.
- Singh, Gurmit (1991). History of Sikh Struggles: Volume II (1966-1984). Atlantic Publishers & Distributors. pp. 1–31. ISBN 9780836427424.
- Sarhadi, Ajit Singh (1970). Punjabi Suba: The Story of the Struggle. Delhi: U. C. Kapur and Sons.
- Gupta, Jyotirindra Das (1970). Language Conflict and National Development: Group Politics and National Language Policy in India. University of California Press. pp. 150–158. ISBN 9780520301115.
- Nayar, Baldev Raj (1966). Minority Politics in the Punjab. Princeton University Press. ISBN 9781400875948.
- Smith, Donald Eugene (1963). India as a Secular State (2nd ed.). Princeton University Press. pp. 448–453. ISBN 9781400877782.
- Kahol, Om Prakasha (1955). Hindus and the Punjabi State: A Psycho-political Discussion on the Conception & Rationale of Punjabi State. Ambala Cantt.: The Hindu Prachara Sabha. p. 9.
