= Sanghol =

Sanghol Ucha Pind
- village
- Location in Punjab, India Sanghol (Punjab)
- Coordinates: 30°47′02″N 76°23′20″E
- Country: India
- State: Punjab
- District: Fatehgarh Sahib

Languages
  - Official: Punjabi
- Time zone: UTC+5:30 (IST)
- PIN: 141128
- Telephone code: 01628
- Nearest city: Khamano

Sanghol is a historical village located in Fatehgarh Sahib District of Punjab, India dating to the Harrapan civilisation. It is also known as Uchha Pind Sanghol. It is about 40 km from Chandigarh on the way to Ludhiana and approximately 10 km from Dholewal. It is of archaeological significance. Excavations at the site have yielded coins and seals related to Toramana and Mihirakula belonging to central Asia. A Buddhist stupa was excavated in 1968, and in February 1985 117 carved stone slabs, including 69 pillars, 35 crossbars, figures and figurines, was excavated by the experts of the Directorate of Archaeology, Punjab. Scholars have said they are Kushan sculptures of the Mathura school of the 1st and 2nd centuries AD. They are in Sanghol Museum. Some of the art pieces from this museum sometimes go on display as special exhibits at various museums around the world.Finally it has received an economic growth in recent years as gold has been found under its land that people think derives from an old Sikh Kingdom. It bordering Pinds (Punjabi villages) are Bathan Khurd, Bathan Kalaan, Khamanon. It will receive finally another economic growth in the upcoming years as it will be on the new Chandigarh road that is being built.

Situated on the top of a mound, Ucha Pind Sanghol is spread over an area of 200 km.

== Archaeobotany ==
Among the remains at Sanghol are several fire altars dated to the Kushan period (c. 100-300 CE), which would have been used to perform yajna fire sacrifices. When excavated, the altars were full of ash and loose soil, with carbonised plant material identifiable as including burnt grains and pulses, seeds, and fruits, as well as wood charcoal. The grains and pulses included rice (Oryza sativa), barley (Hordeum vulgare), wheat (Triticum aestivum), mung (Vigna radiata), urad (Vigna mungo), lentils (Lens culinaris), and sesame (Sesamum indicum). These are all included in the Yajurveda's list of twelve sacred grains to be used for sacrifices. Two grains of horsegram (Dolichos biflorus) and four grains of grasspea (Lathyrus sativus) were also identified among the burnt remains; based on their very small quantity, and their absence from Vedic texts discussing suitable yajna materials, the horsegram and grasspea were likely not intended to be included in the sacrifice and only accidentally ended up mixed in with the other grains and pulses that were meant to be sacrificed.

Edible fruits and nuts included wild jujube (Ziziphus nummularia), cultivated jujube (Ziziphus jujuba), dates, almonds, walnuts, grapes (or more likely, raisins), chilgoza (Pinus gerardiana), pistachio, and gular-fig (Ficus glomerata). Chilgoza was probably then, as now, imported from Afghanistan or the Himalayas.

Medicinal fruits and seeds included emblic myrabolan (Emblica officinalis), nutmeg (Myristica fragrans), tulasi (Ocimum sanctum), chebulic myrabolan (Terminalia chebula), khanda or phok (Ephedra sp.), and black pepper (Piper nigrum). Of these, Ephedra is particularly important because it may represent the ancient soma, which held great religious and cultural importance and was an important component of yajna sacrifices. A few seeds of an unspecified wild sedge (Cyperus sp.) also survived, but their condition was not good enough to identify a specific species.

Wood charcoals included pipal (Ficus religiosa), gular (Ficus glomerata), palash or dhak (Butea monosperma), deodar (Cedrus deodara), tamal (Cinnamomum tamala), sandalwood (Santalum album), and kaith (Feronia limonia). Apart from kaith, all are mentioned in Puranic texts as recommended for use in yajna sacrifices. Deodar, tamal, and sandalwood are not native to the region, and would probably have been imported — deodar and tamal from the Himalayan regions, and sandalwood from southern India. Sandalwood was historically fairly expensive, so its use at Sanghol was likely in limited amounts.

== Museum ==
Sanghol is famed for the Sanghol Museum. It belongs to the civilisation of Harappan which is retained by the Archaeological Survey of India (ASI).It has various antiques that were discovered during the excavations at Sanghol. The various sculptures of stone are the eye catching attractions of the museum which are displayed in the Upper gallery. Maps, charts, photographs, graphs and drawings are arranged chronically. It displays art forms of Kushana period (extending between 2nd and 3rd century). A large of number of relics dating from the late Harappan civilization (1720 – 1300 BC) to 6th century AD is found here. More than 15000 artefacts were collected from this site and majority of them are displayed in this museum.

== Gallery ==
Sanghol Ancient Stupa site info

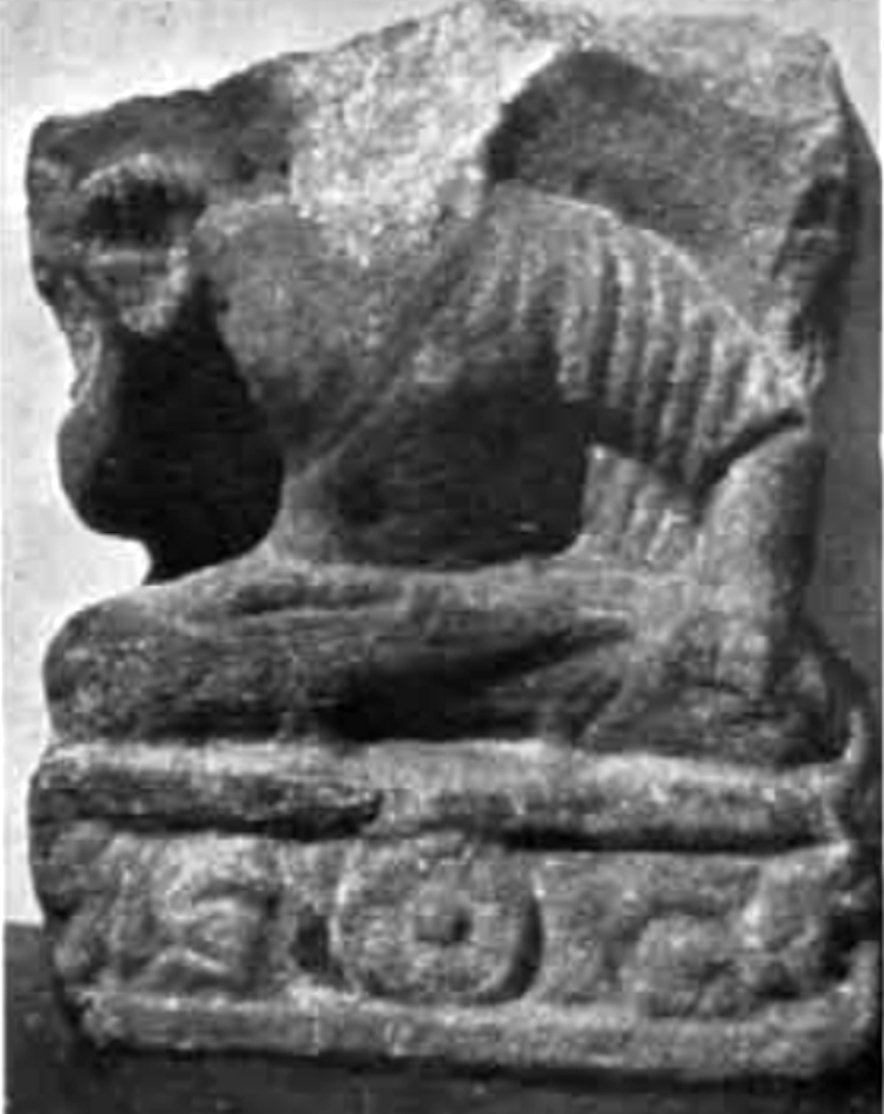
Sanghol Buddha in the style of Mathura

Stupa site

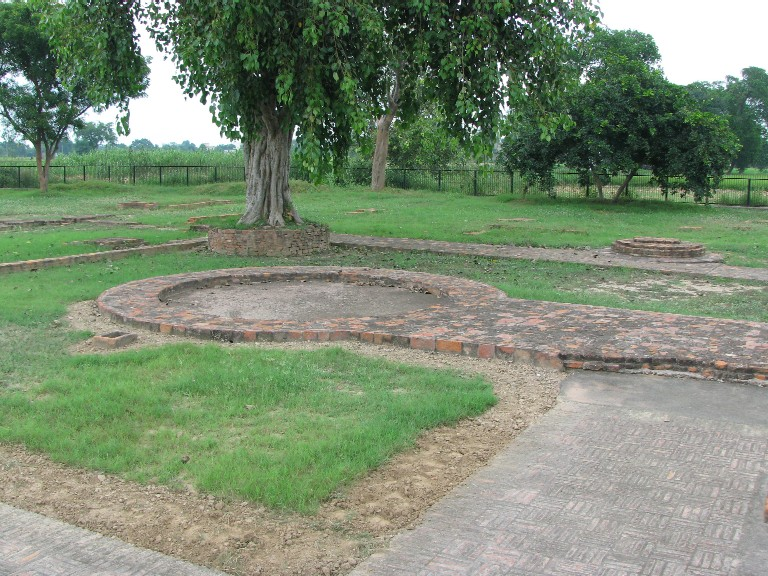
Stupa Site, part on the side

Ancient Site

Village Chowk

Part of Excavation

Museum info board

Museum building

Another excavation in village

Stupa site another angle

Info board on road

Buddhist ancient site
