= Hukam Singh (Punjab politician) =

Indian politician (1895-1983)

Sardar Hukam Singh
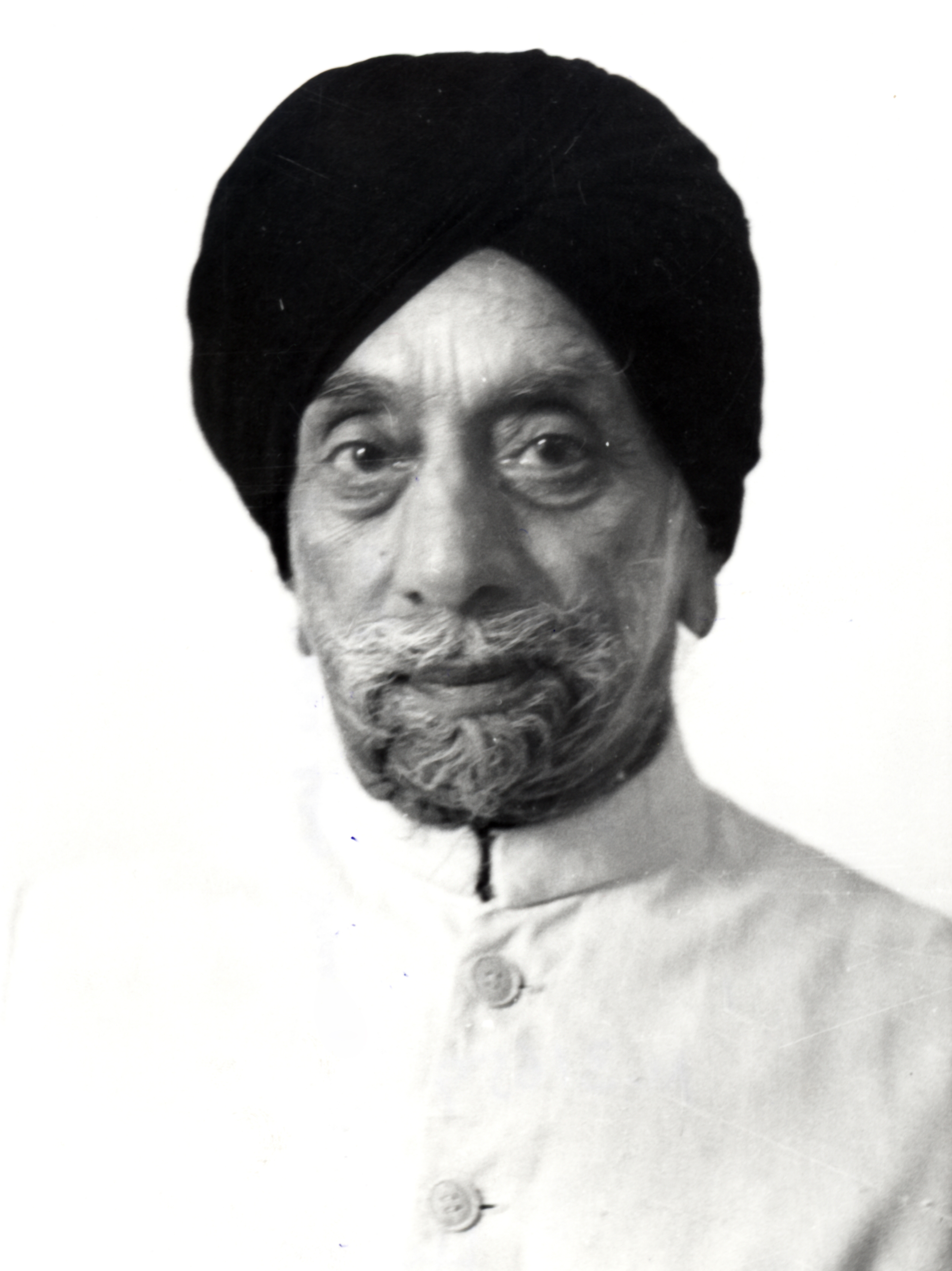

3rd Governor of Rajasthan
- In office 16 April 1967 – 1 July 1972
- Chief Minister: Mohan Lal Sukhadia; Barkatullah Khan
- Preceded by: Sampurnanand
- Succeeded by: Sardar Jogendra Singh

3rd Speaker of the Lok Sabha
- In office 17 April 1962 – 16 March 1967
- Deputy: S. V. Krishnamoorthy Rao
- Preceded by: M. A. Ayyangar
- Succeeded by: N. Sanjiva Reddy
- Constituency: Patiala

Personal details
- Born: 30 August 1895 Montgomery, British India (Now Sahiwal, Pakistan)
- Died: 27 May 1983 (aged 87) Delhi, India

Sardar Hukam Singh (30 August 1895 – 27 May 1983) was an Indian politician and the third Deputy Speaker of the Lok Sabha from 1962 to 1967 and second Speaker of the Lok Sabha. He was also governor of Rajasthan from 1967 to 1972.

== Early life ==
Hukam Singh was born at Montgomery in Sahiwal District (presently in Pakistan). His father Sham Singh was a businessman. He passed his matriculation examination from the Government High School, Montgomery in 1913 and graduated from the Khalsa College, Amritsar, in 1917. He passed his LL.B. examination in 1921 from the Law College, Lahore and subsequently set up a practice as lawyer in Montgomery.

A devout Sikh, Hukam Singh took part in the movement to free Sikh Gurdwaras from British political influence. When the Shiromani Gurdwara Prabandhak Committee (Supreme Gurdwara Management Committee) was declared unlawful and most of its leaders arrested in October 1923, the Sikhs formed another organisation of the same name. Sardar Hukam Singh was a member of this Shiromani Gurdwara Prabandhak Committee (SGPC) and was one of those who were arrested on 7 January 1924 and sentenced to two years imprisonment. He was subsequently elected a member of the SGPC at the first elections held under the Sikh Gurdwaras Act, 1925, and continued to be elected successively for many years. He also participated in the anti-Simon Commission demonstrations in 1928 and was injured and arrested during a police baton charge on a procession in the streets of Montgomery.

Montgomery town, as well as the district of that name, fell in the predominantly Muslim majority region of Punjab, and Sikhs and Hindus faced a grave threat to their lives at the hands of Muslim fanatics, especially during the riots that broke out following the declaration of the partition of India and creation of Pakistan in August 1947. Most Hindus and Sikhs of the district, including Hukam Singh's family, took refuge in the walled compound of Gurdwara Sri Guru Singh Sabha of which he himself was the president. He went about the town evacuating people from their houses, burying the dead, and evacuating the dying to hospital at grave personal risk. He was at the top of the rioters' hit list, when, during the night of 19–20 August 1947, a British officer of the Punjab Boundary Force evacuated him, penniless and disguised in a khaki uniform, to the Firozpur army base.

After about ten days, Hukam Singh learned that his family had arrived safely in Jalandhar. He then traced them to a refugee camp where he was able eventually to rejoin them. Giani Kartar Singh, a vastly influential Sikh leader of those days, introduced Sardar Hukam Singh to the Maharaja of Kapurthala for a position as judge. The maharaja, who himself had taken to English ways of dress, was not at all pleased to see his prospective employee arriving in a traditional Punjabi tunic. As it happened, the prime minister made excuses for Sardar Hukam Singh, saying that as a refugee he had been unable to purchase proper attire. With that, he was hired as a Judge of the Kapurthala High Court.

== Political career ==
Hukam Singh entered politics through the Shiromani Akali Dal and was its president for three years. He was also a member of the Montgomery Singh Sabha and its president for three years. Consequent upon Partition, some seats in the Constituent Assembly of India had become vacant. On a motion from Gurmukh Singh Musafir, the Assembly, on 27 January 1948 approved a motion to include two Sikh and two Hindu members elected from East Punjab. Hukam Singh was elected to the Constituent Assembly of India on 30 April 1948 as a member of the Shiromani Akali Dal. He actively participated in the Constituent Assembly's debates, and only a year after his entry was nominated to the panel of its chairman. He continued to be on the panel till his unanimous election as Deputy Speaker on 20 March 1956, this even though he was a member of the Opposition. This was a testimony not only to his popularity, but also to the confidence of the members in his ability to run the House in an efficient and impartial manner. Although in March 1948 the Shiromani Akali Dal had directed all Akali legislators to join the Congress legislature en bloc, Hukam Singh continued to function in opposition. He stubbornly fought for the protection of the rights of the minorities and, failing to obtain protection for Sikhs as a religious minority, refused to put his signature to the new constitution. He was also a member of the Provisional Parliament (1950–52).

In the 1st Lok Sabha, Hukam Singh was elected from Kapurthala Bhatinda constituency in PEPSU state as an Akali Party candidate. He became the secretary of the National Democratic Front led by Shyama Prasad Mookerjee, who was its president. Later he joined and remained in the Congress political party. On 20 March 1956, Hukam Singh was unanimously elected as the Deputy Speaker of the Lok Sabha. In 1957, he was elected to the 2nd Lok Sabha from Bhatinda constituency as a Congress candidate. He was elected as Deputy Speaker of the 2nd Lok Sabha on 17 May 1957. In 1962, he was elected to the 3rd Lok Sabha from Patiala constituency as a Congress candidate.

== Speaker of the Lok Sabha ==
He became speaker of the 3rd Lok Sabha (India's Lower House of Parliament) on 17 April 1962. As speaker of the Lok Sabha, Sardar Hukam Singh firmly upheld the supremacy of the legislature over the executive branch of government. He also ensured that decorum and discipline were observed in the House. If a member rose and spoke without being identified by the chair, he would not catch the Speaker's eye. If the member persisted in continuing, he would not be asked to speak in the future. In extreme cases, the Speaker would instruct reporters not to record such speeches.

Hukam Singh presided impartially over debates on many subjects. The Defence of India Act was one of the major legislations passed by the House in the wake of the Sino-Indian War in 1962. He also maintained decorum during the stormy debates when, for the first time in the history of the Lok Sabha, no confidence motions against the Council of Ministers were admitted and discussed in the House.

He was also the chairman of the Parliamentary Committee formed in October 1965 to find a solution to the issue of Punjabi Suba. The longstanding deadlock over this issue was overcome when the committee gave its verdict in favour of a Punjabi State reorganised on a linguistic basis.

== Activities in retirement ==
Sardar Hukam Singh was appointed governor of Rajasthan after his retirement from elected duties in 1967. He served as governor until 1 July 1972, when he settled down in Delhi.

Sardar Hukam Singh's retirement did not last long, however. In March 1973, the Shiromani Gurudwara Prabandhak Committee formed the Sri Guru Singh Sabha Shatabdi (centenary) Committee to celebrate the centenary of the Singh Sabha movement launched in 1873 with Hukam Singh as president. In this role, he participated in a tour of North America and Europe, touring the newfound domain of Sikhism in the Western Hemisphere, with special attention to the mission established by Siri Singh Sahib Harbhajan Singh Khalsa Yogiji (Yogi Bhajan). Sardar Hukam Singh was accompanied on this trip in the summer of 1974 by Gurcharan Singh Tohra, SGPC President and Surjit Singh Barnala.

== Author and editor ==
As an eloquent lover of Sikhism, Sardar Hukam Singh launched the Spokesman English weekly in Delhi in 1951, and served as its editor for many years. He is also the author of two books in English, The Sikh Cause and The Problem of the Sikhs.
