= Darshan Singh Pheruman =

Indian freedom fighter and politician

- Born: 1 August 1885; Pheruman, Amritsar, Punjab Province, British India
- Died: 27 October 1969 (aged 84); Amritsar, Punjab, India
- Cause of death: Hunger strike
- Title: Member of Parliament
- Term: 1947 - 1964
- Political party: Indian National Congress (1947 - 1959); Swatantra Party

Darshan Singh Pheruman (1 August 1885 – 27 October 1969) was an Indian freedom fighter, Sikh activist and politician.

== Early life ==
Darshan Singh Pheruman was born on 1 August 1888 at Amritsar, India in a Sikh family. In 1912, he joined Indian Army as a sepoy. In 1914, he left the Army and started his own construction business in Hissar.

== Pre-Independence activism ==
Later, Pheruman gave up his business and joined the Gurdwara Reform Movement. In 1921, he was arrested and jailed for one year during an agitation launched to recover the keys of the Golden Temple treasury from the British deputy commissioner of Amritsar. In December 1924, as a part of the Gurdwara Reform Movement, he led a group of Sikhs referred to as Shahidi jatha (14th of total 16 groups) into the Jaito agitation. He was arrested and jailed for ten months. The agitation ended with the enactment of the Sikh Gurdwaras Act, 1925. In 1926, he took part in the Non-cooperation movement launched by the Indian National Congress and went to jail for 14 months. In 1926, he visited Malaya and was arrested because of his past record in India. In jail, he was not allowed to wear Kacchera, one the five articles of Sikh faith, which a Sikh must wear all the time. As a protest, he went on hunger strike for over three weeks. Upon his return from Malaya, he joined the civil disobedience movement and went to jail three times. He favored the Akali Dal participation in Quit India Movement and himself took part in it.

== Post-Independence ==
After the Indian independence, Pheruman became a member of Rajya Sabha until 1964. In 1959, he left the Indian National Congress and joined the newly formed Swatantra Party.

== Fast unto death ==
After the creation of Punjab, India on linguistic lines in 1966, Akali Dal demanded that Chandigarh and certain other Punjabi speaking areas which were not part of Punjab should be transferred to Punjab. On 17 December 1966, Akali Dal leader Sant Fateh Singh went into a fast and threatened to self-immolate himself 10 days later on 27 December 1966. However, Indian Prime Minister Indira Gandhi promised to arbitrate the dispute and Fateh Singh ended his fast on 27 December 1966. However, no action was taken. In August 1969, Pheruman accused Fateh Singh of lowering the dignity of Sikhism by breaking his ardas (pledge). He announced he would fast until death for the disputed areas and to uphold to dignity of ardas. He was arrested on 12 August in Amritsar and on 15 August started a fast inside the jail. On 27 August he was admitted into hospital but refused all forms of feeding. He died on 27 October 1969, the 74th day of his hunger strike. After his death, his supporters floated a new Akali Dal named after him.

== Legacy ==
Shaheed Darshan Singh Pheruman Memorial College for Women and Shaheed Darshan Singh Pheruman Public School were established in 1974 and 1981 respectively in his memory by the Shaheed Darshan Singh Pheruman Memorial Trust. A Sikh Gurdwara in Dholewal is also named after him.

== See also ==
- Giani Ditt Singh, a Sikh scholar, poet, editor and Singh Sabha reformer.
