= Sanghol Museum =

- Location: Sanghol, Punjab, India
- Coordinates: 30.7902°N 76.4012°E
- Type: archaeological museum

The Sanghol Museum is an archaeological museum in Sanghol, Punjab, India. The existing building of the Museum was inaugurated on April 10, 1990 as a subordinate unit of the Department of Cultural Affairs, Archaeology and Museums of the Punjab Government.

== Gallery ==
Sanghol Ancient Stupa site info

Stupa site

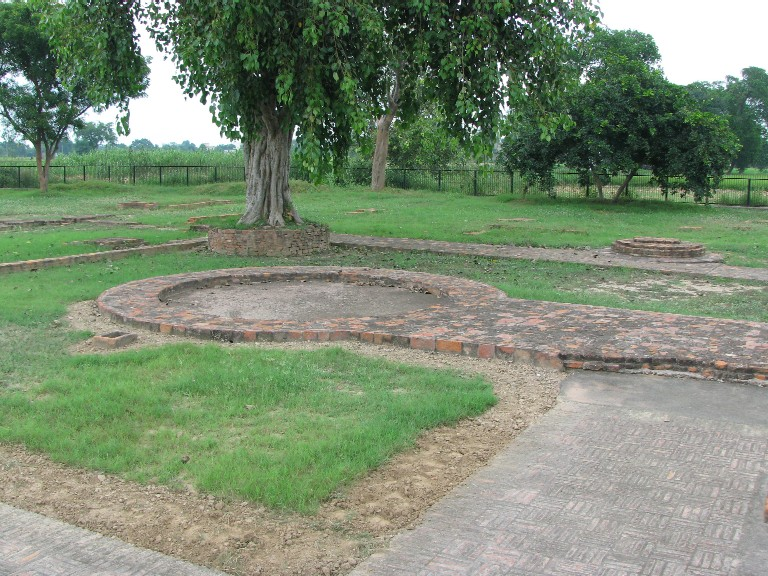
Stupa Site, part on the side

Ancient Site

Village Chowk

Part of Excavation

Museum info board

Museum building

Another excavation in village

Info board on road
