= Dholewal =

- Village
- Location in Punjab, India Dholewal (India)
- Coordinates: 30.740508°N 76.347342°E
- Country: India
- State: Punjab
- District: Fatehgarh Sahib

Government
  - Sarpanch: Sarabjit Kaur
  - Panch (1): Sher Singh
  - Panch (2): Tarsem Singh

Area
  - Total: 2.48 km^{2} (0.96 sq mi)

Population
  - Total: 1,098
  - Density: 443/km^{2} (1,150/sq mi)

Languages
  - Official: Punjabi
- Time zone: UTC+5:30 (IST)
- PIN: 141411
- Telephone code: 01628
- Vehicle registration: PB 49
- Nearest city: Khanna
- Sex ratio: 877:1000 ♂/♀
- Literacy: 58%
- Lok Sabha constituency: Khanna

Dholewal is a small village in the Fatehgarh Sahib district in the Indian State of Punjab, with a population of 1,098. The nearest town is Kheri Naudh Singh, 1 km east to the village. Dholewal falls under the Jurisdiction of the Khamanon City Tehsil, home to the Senior Superintendent of Police and Magistrate of the area. The largest city near the village is Khanna, approximately 10 km west to the village.

== History ==
The history of Dholewal can be traced back to the 1890s. Most village residents migrated from other parts of Punjab. Those with the surname Maan, which is more than 20 families, are thought to have originated from a village named Dhanola. Fifteen Maangat families migrated from Chandran, seventeen Kharoud families migrated from Sakhrali, and twenty families of Kanda migrated from Moga. The richest families of this region are the Maan and the Kharoud families. They have a good character and are hospitable to everyone. They make up the biggest landowners. The village comes under the Fatehgarh Sahib District. Many residents have left the village for economic reasons. The majority of them have moved to large cities for better income and a higher standard of living.

== Demographics ==
Dholewal has a population of 748 (as of the 2001 Census of India) with 53% of the population being male and 47% female. 16% percent of the village population is under 10 years old. The literacy rate of the village is 58%. People from different castes reside in the village. The majority of the population belongs to the Jatt Sikh community. Dalits are a visible minority in the village.

== Education ==
Dholewal has an elementary school situated on the Dholewal-Hargana road. Students from middle-income families go to private schools, but low-income children go to public schools due to lower tuition fees. Many of the young people in the village have a high school education, and a small number of students pursue a bachelor's degree. Income inequality within the village plays a major role in educational attainment, as more than half of the poor families do not have access to education.

== Religion ==
Dholewal is demographically diverse, but the majority are Jatt Sikhs with a visible minority of Dalits and Chammars. The largest religion in the village is Sikhism. There are three gurudwaras (religious temples) in the village. There is a small community of Hindu people in the village who belong to the Khatri caste.

== Sports and leisure activities ==
Football and volleyball are the two most popular sports in Dholewal. There were some competitions in the past between this village and other villages. A village playground is located at the elementary school. The volleyball ground is located at the Gurudwara site. Many older people do not play any physical sports but enjoy playing cards. The village panchayat (assembly) is considering investing in sports activities over the next two years, with the village volleyball ground scheduled to be upgraded in 2011. Contributions to community projects remain limited by the diaspora from the community, worsened by the 2008 recession.

Daljinder Singh Kharaud D.P.E was a national champion in 1983 at Calcutta in races (100 m). And in 2011, S. Daljinder Singh Kharaud participated in an international veteran's athletic meet in Pune and placed sixth in the 100 meter race.

At that time, many new players from Dholewal did well at the national and international levels. One is Naminderdeep Singh Maangat who won a silver medal in North India Boxing Championship in 2013 and is also a three-time Punjab champion. Naminderdeep Singh Maangat also participated three times in All India University. He won three gold, one silver, and nine bronze medals for his village, Naminderdeep Singh Maangat and Bhai Balkar Singh ji is also the president of Youth Sports Welfare Club Dholewal.

== Foreign families ==
Approximately 20 households have family members settled abroad in North America, Europe, the Middle East, and Australasia. Remittances are a major source of income for those families.

== Economy ==
Agriculture is the primary source of income in Dholewal. Approximately 75% of the village population earn their living from farming. Ten percent are employed in the public and private service sectors. Ten percent are self-employed, and 5% are unemployed. The main agricultural products of Dholewal are wheat, rice, sugarcane, sunflower, and various vegetables. Agriculture is not industrialized. Income distribution in the village is unequal; the landlord families of Dholewal earn 50% of the gross product while 15% of residents live below the poverty line. Dalit and Chammar families earn less than 100 rupees ($2 USD) a day. In 2006–07, the Gross Domestic Product of Dholewal was 2.6 crore rupees, and the median income for households was 50,000 rupees, which is well above the state and national average.

== Politics ==
Dholewal has a rich history in political affairs. Voters in the village are divided into two main political parties, the Indian National Congress Party and the Shiromani Akali Dal. Dholewal village is under the jurisdiction of the legislative assembly seat at Khanna City. Former MLA (Member of Legislative Assembly) of Khanna City Sh. Shamsher Singh Dullo visited the village during his tenure. In recent elections, the majority of village voters favor the Akali Dal Party, which is the current governing party of the State of Punjab.

== Internal issues ==
The main public issues are the village's playground, sewerage system and lack of good educational institutions. Many low-income families are unable to send their children to school as a result of the unavailability of public education.

The village's strikingly low sex ratio (877/1000) is another matter of concern. The village sex ratio is consistent with the state. This issue remains to be the most challenging to address.
